= List of leptotyphlopid species and subspecies =

This is a list of all genera, species and subspecies of the family Leptotyphlopidae, otherwise referred to as slender blind snakes, threadsnakes, or leptotyphlopids. It follows the taxonomy currently provided by ITIS, which is based on the continuing work of Dr. Roy McDiarmid.

- Leptotyphlops, Slender blind snakes
  - Leptotyphlops affinis, Venezuela blind snake
  - Leptotyphlops albifrons, Wagler's blind snake
  - Leptotyphlops albipunctus
  - Leptotyphlops albiventer
  - Leptotyphlops anthracinus, Bailey's blind snake
  - Leptotyphlops asbolepis
  - Leptotyphlops australis, Freiberg's blind snake
  - Leptotyphlops bicolor, Two-colored blind snake
  - Leptotyphlops bilineatus, Two-lined blind snake
  - Leptotyphlops blanfordii
  - Leptotyphlops borapeliotes
  - Leptotyphlops borrichianus, Degerbol's blind snake
  - Leptotyphlops boulengeri, Manda flesh-pink blind snake
  - Leptotyphlops brasiliensis, Brazilian blind snake
  - Leptotyphlops bressoni, Michoacán slender blind snake
  - Leptotyphlops brevicaudus
  - Leptotyphlops brevissimus, Caqueta blind snake
  - Leptotyphlops broadleyi
  - Leptotyphlops burii, Arabian blind snake
  - Leptotyphlops cairi, Cairo blind snake
  - Leptotyphlops calypso
  - Leptotyphlops carlae World's smallest snake
  - Leptotyphlops collaris, Collared blind snake
  - Leptotyphlops columbi, San Salvador blind snake
  - Leptotyphlops conjunctus, Cape thread snake
    - Leptotyphlops conjunctus conjunctus
    - Leptotyphlops conjunctus incognitus
    - Leptotyphlops conjunctus latirostris
    - Leptotyphlops conjunctus lepezi
  - Leptotyphlops cupinensis, Mata Grosso blind snake
  - Leptotyphlops debilis, West African blind snake
  - Leptotyphlops diaplocius, Common Peru blind snake
  - Leptotyphlops dimidiatus, Dainty blind snake
  - Leptotyphlops dissimilis, Sudan blind snake
  - Leptotyphlops distanti, Distant's blind snake
  - Leptotyphlops drewesi
  - Leptotyphlops dugandi, Dugand's blind snake
  - Leptotyphlops dulcis, Texas blind snake
    - Leptotyphlops dulcis dissectus
    - Leptotyphlops dulcis dulcis
    - Leptotyphlops dulcis myopicus
  - Leptotyphlops emini
  - Leptotyphlops filiformis, Socotra Island blind snake
  - Leptotyphlops fitzingeri
  - Leptotyphlops gestri
  - Leptotyphlops goudotii, Black blind snake
    - Leptotyphlops goudotii ater
    - Leptotyphlops goudotii goudotii
    - Leptotyphlops goudotii magnamaculatus
    - Leptotyphlops goudotii phenops
  - Leptotyphlops gracilior, Slender thread snake
  - Leptotyphlops guayaquilensis, Guayaquila blind snake
  - Leptotyphlops hamulirostris
  - Leptotyphlops humilis, Western threadsnake
    - Leptotyphlops humilis boettgeri
    - Leptotyphlops humilis cahuilae
    - Leptotyphlops humilis dugesii
    - Leptotyphlops humilis humilis
    - Leptotyphlops humilis levitoni
    - Leptotyphlops humilis lindsayi
    - Leptotyphlops humilis segregus
    - Leptotyphlops humilis tenuiculus
    - Leptotyphlops humilis utahensis
  - Leptotyphlops joshuai, Joshua's blind snake
  - Leptotyphlops koppesi, Amaral's blind snake
  - Leptotyphlops labialis, Damara thread snake
  - Leptotyphlops leptepileptus
  - Leptotyphlops longicaudus, Long-tailed thread snake
  - Leptotyphlops macrolepis, Big-scaled blind snake
  - Leptotyphlops macrops
  - Leptotyphlops macrorhynchus, Longnosed worm snake
  - Leptotyphlops macrurus, Boulenger's blind snake
  - Leptotyphlops maximus, Giant blind snake
  - Leptotyphlops melanotermus, Latin American blind snake
  - Leptotyphlops melanurus, Dark blind snake
  - Leptotyphlops munoai
  - Leptotyphlops narirostris
    - Leptotyphlops narirostris boueti
    - Leptotyphlops narirostris narirostris
  - Leptotyphlops nasalis, Taylor's blind snake
  - Leptotyphlops natatrix, Gambia blind snake
  - Leptotyphlops nicefori, Santander blind snake
  - Leptotyphlops nigricans, Black thread snake
  - Leptotyphlops nursii, Nurse's blind snake
  - Leptotyphlops occidentalis, Western thread snake
  - Leptotyphlops perreti
  - Leptotyphlops peruvianus, Peru blind snake
  - Leptotyphlops pyrites, Thomas' blind snake
  - Leptotyphlops reticulatus, Reticulate blind snake
  - Leptotyphlops rostratus, Bocage's blind snake
  - Leptotyphlops rubrolineatus, Red-lined blind snake
  - Leptotyphlops rufidorsus, Rose blind snake
  - Leptotyphlops salgueiroi, Espírito Santo blind snake
  - Leptotyphlops scutifrons, Peter's thread snake
  - Leptotyphlops septemstriatus, Seven-striped blind snake
  - Leptotyphlops signatus, South American blind snake
  - Leptotyphlops striatulus
  - Leptotyphlops subcrotillus, Klauber's blind snake
  - Leptotyphlops sundewalli, Sundevalls worm snake
  - Leptotyphlops teaguei, Northern blind snake
  - Leptotyphlops telloi, Tello's thread snake
  - Leptotyphlops tesselatus, Tschudi's blind snake
  - Leptotyphlops tricolor, Three-colored blind snake
  - Leptotyphlops undecimstriatus, Eleven-striped blind snake
  - Leptotyphlops unguirostris, Southern blind snake
  - Leptotyphlops variabilis
  - Leptotyphlops vellardi
  - Leptotyphlops weyrauchi, Argentine blind snake
  - Leptotyphlops wilsoni, Wilson's blind snake
- Rhinoleptus, Villiers' blind snake
  - Rhinoleptus koniagui, Villiers' blind snake
