= Epictia phenops =

Scientific classification
- Kingdom: Animalia
- Phylum: Chordata
- Class: Reptilia
- Order: Squamata
- Suborder: Serpentes
- Family: Leptotyphlopidae
- Genus: Epictia
- Species: E. phenops

Binomial name
- Epictia phenops (Cope, 1875)

Synonyms
- Stenostoma phenops Cope, 1875

Species of snake

Epictia phenops, also known as slender threadsnake, is a species of snake in the family Leptotyphlopidae. It is probably a composite taxon consisting of several cryptic species.

== Distribution ==
E. phenops is found in El Salvador, Guatemala, Belize, Honduras, and southern Mexico. It occurs in a wide range of habitats, from savanna to montane rainforest.

== Morphology ==
The species has a mean total length of 132 mm, though specimens can be as short as 53 mm, but as long as 195 mm.
