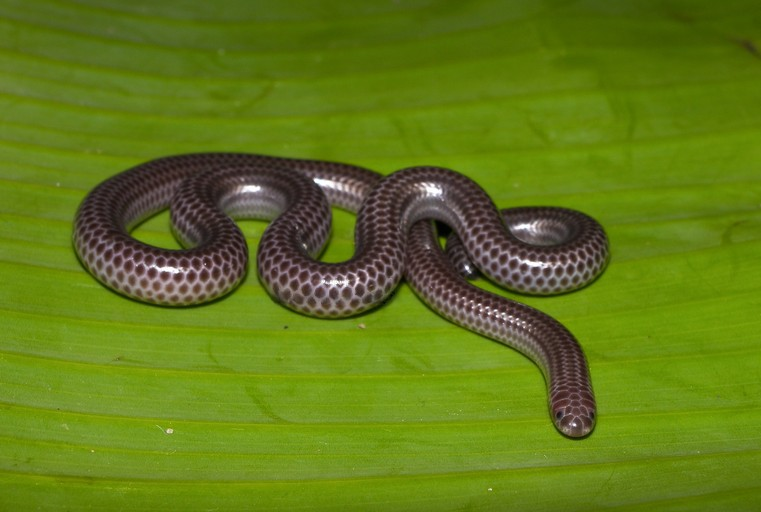
- Trilepida macrolepis

Scientific classification
- Kingdom: Animalia
- Phylum: Chordata
- Class: Reptilia
- Order: Squamata
- Suborder: Serpentes
- Family: Leptotyphlopidae
- Subfamily: Epictinae; Hedges, Adalsteinsson & Branch, 2009

Tribes
- Epictini; Rhinoleptini

= Epictinae =

Subfamily of snakes

Epictinae (commonly called slender blind snakes or threadsnakes) are a subfamily of snakes found in the New World and equatorial Africa. Members of this subfamily tend to have short, thick tails, and the fewest subcaudal scales. It comprises two tribes, three subtribes, ten genera, and 86 species.

== Taxonomy ==
- Tribe Epictini, New World snakes
  - Subtribe Epictina
    - Genus Epictia Gray, 1845 (43 species)
    - Genus Habrophallos A. Martins, Koch, Pinto, Folly, Fouquet & Passos, 2020 – collared blind snake (monotypic)
    - Genus Siagonodon W. Peters, 1881 (4 species)
  - Subtribe Renina
    - Genus Rena Baird & Girard, 1853 (10 species)
    - Genus Trilepida Hedges, 2011 (14 species)
  - Subtribe Tetracheilostomina
    - Genus Mitophis Hedges, Adalsteinsson & Branch, 2009 (4 species)
    - Genus Tetracheilostoma Jan, 1861 (3 species)
- Tribe Rhinoleptini, African snakes
  - Genus Tricheilostoma Jan, 1860 (5 species)
  - Genus Rhinoleptus Orejas-Miranda, Roux-Estève & Guibé, 1970 – Villiers's blind snake (monotypic)
  - Genus Rhinoguinea J.-F. Trape 2014 – Rhinoguinea magna (monotypic)

== Distribution ==
The subfamily Epictinae is distributed in the New World and in equatorial Africa. In the New World it ranges from North America (California, Utah, and Kansas) south through Middle and South America (exclusive of the high Andes) to Uruguay and Argentina on the Atlantic side. It also occurs on San Salvador Island (Bahamas), Hispaniola, the Lesser Antilles, Cozumel Island (Mexico), Islas de Bahia and Swan Islands (Honduras), San Andres and Providencia Islands (Colombia), Bonaire, Margarita Islands, and Trinidad. It also occurs in equatorial Africa, from southern Senegal, Guinea, and Bioko Island in the west to Ethiopia in the east.
