= Epictia amazonica =

Scientific classification
- Kingdom: Animalia
- Phylum: Chordata
- Class: Reptilia
- Order: Squamata
- Suborder: Serpentes
- Family: Leptotyphlopidae
- Genus: Epictia
- Species: E. amazonica

Binomial name
- Epictia amazonica (Orejas-Miranda, 1969)

Synonyms
- Leptotyphlops amazonicus Orejas-Miranda, 1969; Epictia amazonica — Natera-Mumaw et al., 2015

Species of snake

Epictia amazonica, also known commonly as the South American blind snake, is a species of snake in the family Leptotyphlopidae. The species is native to northern South America.

== Description ==
Epictia amazonica is black both dorsally and ventrally, except for the rostral and the tail tip which are tan.

== Geographic range ==
Epictia amazonica is found in Colombia, French Guiana, Guyana, and southeastern Venezuela (Amazonas, Bolívar).

== Reproduction ==
Epictia amazonica is oviparous.
