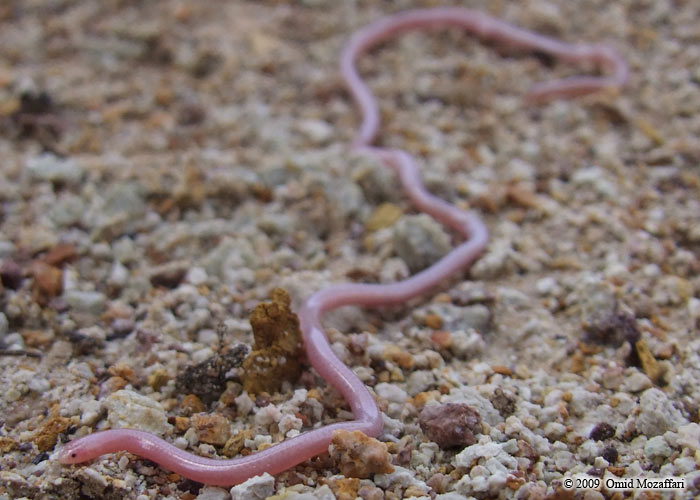

Conservation status
- Least Concern (IUCN 3.1)

Scientific classification
- Kingdom: Animalia
- Phylum: Chordata
- Class: Reptilia
- Order: Squamata
- Suborder: Serpentes
- Family: Leptotyphlopidae
- Genus: Myriopholis
- Species: M. macrorhyncha

Binomial name
- Myriopholis macrorhyncha (Jan, 1860)

Synonyms
- Stenostoma (Ramphostoma) macrorhynchum Jan In Jan & Sordelli, 1860; Stenostoma (Ramphostoma) macrorhynchum - Jan, 1861; Glauconia macrorhynchus - Boulenger, 1890; Glauconia macrorhynchus - Boulenger, 1893; Glauconia algeriensis Jacquet, 1895; Leptotyphlops phillipsi Barbour, 1914; Glauconia erythraea Scortecci, 1928; Glauconia braccianii Scortecci, 1928; Leptotyphlops macrorhynchus - Corkill, 1932; Leptotyphlops macrorhynchus [macrorhynchus] - Angel, 1936; Leptotyphlops macrorynchus bilmaensis Angel, 1936; Leptotyphlops braccianii - Parker, 1949; Leptotyphlops erythraea - Parker, 1949; Leptotyphlops erythraeus - Hahn, 1980; Leptotyphlops macrorhynchus macrorhynchus - Hahn, 1980; Leptotyphlops macrorhynchus bilmaensis - Hahn, 1980

= Myriopholis macrorhyncha =

Species of snake

Myriopholis macrorhyncha, also known as the long-nosed worm snake or hook-snouted worm snake, is a harmless blind snake species found in northern Africa and southwestern Asia. No subspecies are currently recognized.

== Description ==
This reptile's appearance is similar to M. cairi.

== Geographic range ==
Found in isolated populations across northern Africa and in southwestern Asia. In Africa it occurs in Morocco, Mauritania, Senegal, Guinea, Ghana, Algeria, Tunisia, Niger, Libya, Chad, Mali, Egypt, Sudan, Somalia and Ethiopia. In Asia it has been reported in Aden (Yemen), Turkey, Iran, Israel, Iraq and Pakistan. The type locality given is "Sennaar" (Sudan).

== Taxonomy ==
A subspecies, M. m. bilmaensis Angel, 1936, found in Niger was recognized by Hahn (1980).
