= Santander blind snake =

Conservation status
- Data Deficient (IUCN 3.1)

Scientific classification
- Kingdom: Animalia
- Phylum: Chordata
- Order: Squamata
- Suborder: Serpentes
- Family: Leptotyphlopidae
- Genus: Trilepida
- Species: T. nicefori

Binomial name
- Trilepida nicefori Dunn, 1946

Synonyms
- Leptotyphlops nicefori Dunn, 1946; Rena nicefori — Adalsteinsson et al., 2009; Tricheilostoma nicefori — Pinto et al., 2010; Trilepida nicefori — Hedges, 2011

Species of snake

The Santander blind snake (Trilepida nicefori) is a species of snake in the subfamily Epictinae of the family Leptotyphlopidae. The species is endemic to Colombia.

== Etymology ==
The specific name, nicefori, is in honor of missionary Brother Nicéforo María (1888–1980), born Antoine Rouhaire in France, who established a natural history museum in Medellín, Colombia.

== Geographic distribution ==
Trilepida nicefori is known only from Santander Department, Colombia.

== Habitat ==
The preferred natural habitat of Trilepida nicefori is forest, at elevations of 1,750–1,824 m (5,741–5,984 ft).

== Description ==
Trilepida nicefori is a very small snake. Adults may attain a total length (including tail) of 10.5 cm (4.1 in). It is uniform brown dorsally, and beige ventrally.

== Behavior ==
Trilepida nicefori is terrestrial and fossorial.

== Diet ==
Trilepida nicefori preys upon termites and also eats insect larvae.

== Reproduction ==
Trilepida nicefori is oviparous.
