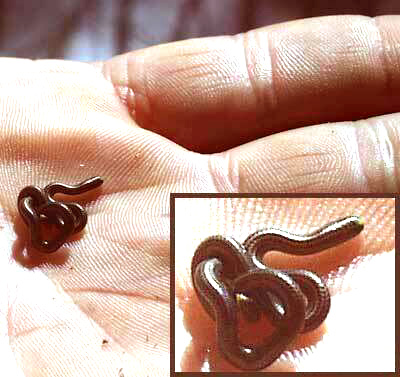

Scientific classification
- Kingdom: Animalia
- Phylum: Chordata
- Class: Reptilia
- Order: Squamata
- Suborder: Serpentes
- Family: Leptotyphlopidae
- Genus: Epictia
- Species: E. vindumi

Binomial name
- Epictia vindumi Wallach, 2016

= Epictia vindumi =

Species of snake

Epictia vindumi, or Vindum's worm snake, is a member of the family Leptotyphlopidae, whose species, as well as worm snakes, often are called slender blind snakes or thread snakes.

== Description ==
As with most Epictia species, Epictia vindumi looks like a worm. The species is brown with yellowish stripes running its length, with a small yellow spot at the body's front end. The head is slightly wider than the neck. The snake's scale arrangement formula, often used by herpetologists to identify species, is 14–14–14, meaning that there are 14 rows of scales at the neck, 14 rows at the body's middle, and 14 rows at the tail area before the cloaca. To distinguish the species from similar ones, much more technical details must be noticed.

== Distribution ==
Epictia vindumi is endemic just to the northern portion of Mexico's Yucatan Peninsula, in the states of Yucatán and Quintana Roo, at elevations of up to about 30 meters (~100 feet).

== Habitat ==
Epictia vindumi is described as occurring in low, scrubby forest dominated by thorny trees belonging to the bean or legume family, the Fabaceae.

The picture on this page is of an individual unearthed by gardeners moving rocks on the grounds of an old hacienda in Yucatán state.

All members of the family Leptotyphlopidae have been described as subterranean and nocturnal. However, a recent study found that Epictia munoai of South America was active under rocks during the hottest periods of the day.

== Taxonomy ==
Snakes of the family Leptotyphlopidae, to which Epictia vindumi belongs, as well as those of four other families, form a clade, or infraorder, known as Scolecophidia. This grouping comprises the most ancient yet highly specialized of snake species, dating back to the Jurassic Period, of about 155 million years ago.

The holotype of Epictia vindumi is a specimen collected by E. Wyllis Andrews in February, 1959, at the ruins of Chichén Itzá in Yucatán state. However, at that time the specimen wasn't recognized as a new species. In fact, Epictia vindumi is described from very similar specimens earlier given different names, in the genera Epictia, Leptotyphlops, Stenostoma and Glauconia.

== Etymology ==
The genus name Epictia was first published by John Edward Gray in 1845. However, in that publication he doesn't explain the name's origin.

The species name vendumi honors Jens Vindum, Senior Collection Manager, Department of Herpetology, California Academy of Sciences, and commemorates his 35 years of service to the museum.
