= Namibiana latifrons =

Scientific classification
- Domain: Eukaryota
- Kingdom: Animalia
- Phylum: Chordata
- Class: Reptilia
- Order: Squamata
- Suborder: Serpentes
- Family: Leptotyphlopidae
- Genus: Namibiana
- Species: N. latifrons

Binomial name
- Namibiana latifrons (Sternfeld, 1908)

Synonyms
- Glauconia latifrons Sternfeld, 1908; Leptotyphlops latifrons (Sternfeld, 1908)

Species of snake

Namibiana latifrons, also known as the Benguela worm snake or Sternfeld's threadsnake, is a species of snake in the family Leptotyphlopidae. It is endemic to the southwestern coast of Angola.
