= Thomas's blind snake =

Conservation status
- Endangered (IUCN 3.1)

Scientific classification
- Kingdom: Animalia
- Phylum: Chordata
- Class: Reptilia
- Order: Squamata
- Suborder: Serpentes
- Family: Leptotyphlopidae
- Genus: Mitophis
- Species: M. pyrites

Binomial name
- Mitophis pyrites Thomas, 1965

Synonyms
- Leptotyphlops pyrites

Species of snake

Thomas's blind snake (Mitophis pyrites) is an endangered species of snake in the family Leptotyphlopidae. It is endemic to the Caribbean island of Hispaniola, where it is found in the Sud-Est Department in Haiti and Pedernales Province in the Dominican Republic.
