= Freiberg's blind snake =

Conservation status
- Least Concern (IUCN 3.1)

Scientific classification
- Kingdom: Animalia
- Phylum: Chordata
- Class: Reptilia
- Order: Squamata
- Suborder: Serpentes
- Family: Leptotyphlopidae
- Genus: Epictia
- Species: E. australis

Binomial name
- Epictia australis (Freiberg & Orejas-Miranda, 1968)

Synonyms
- Leptotyphlops australis

Species of snake

Freiberg's blind snake (Epictia australis) is a species of snake in the family Leptotyphlopidae.
