= Tschudi's blind snake =

Conservation status
- Least Concern (IUCN 3.1)

Scientific classification
- Kingdom: Animalia
- Phylum: Chordata
- Class: Reptilia
- Order: Squamata
- Suborder: Serpentes
- Family: Leptotyphlopidae
- Genus: Epictia
- Species: E. tesselata

Binomial name
- Epictia tesselata (Tschudi, 1845)

Synonyms
- Typhlops tesselatus; Stenostoma albifrons var. tessellata; Stenostoma albifrons var. tessellatum; Leptotyphlops tessellatus

Species of snake

Tschudi's blind snake (Epictia tesselata) is a species of snake in the family Leptotyphlopidae.
