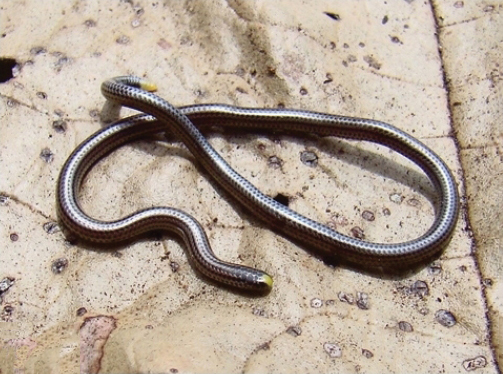

Scientific classification
- Domain: Eukaryota
- Kingdom: Animalia
- Phylum: Chordata
- Class: Reptilia
- Order: Squamata
- Suborder: Serpentes
- Family: Leptotyphlopidae
- Genus: Epictia
- Species: E. borapeliotes

Binomial name
- Epictia borapeliotes Vanzolini, 1996

Synonyms
- Leptotyphlops borapeliotes

= Epictia borapeliotes =

Species of snake

Epictia borapeliotes is a species of snakes in the family Leptotyphlopidae.
