= Dark blind snake =

Conservation status
- Data Deficient (IUCN 3.1)

Scientific classification
- Kingdom: Animalia
- Phylum: Chordata
- Class: Reptilia
- Order: Squamata
- Suborder: Serpentes
- Family: Leptotyphlopidae
- Genus: Epictia
- Species: E. melanura

Binomial name
- Epictia melanura (Schmidt & Walker, 1943)

Synonyms
- Leptotyphlops melanurus; Epictia melanurus

Species of snake

The dark blind snake (Epictia melanura) is a species of snake in the family Leptotyphlopidae.
