= San Salvador blind snake =

Conservation status
- Least Concern (IUCN 3.1)

Scientific classification
- Kingdom: Animalia
- Phylum: Chordata
- Class: Reptilia
- Order: Squamata
- Suborder: Serpentes
- Family: Leptotyphlopidae
- Genus: Epictia
- Species: E. columbi

Binomial name
- Epictia columbi (Klauber, 1939)

Synonyms
- Leptotyphlops columbi Klauber, 1939; Leptotyphlops columbi — McDiarmid, Campbell & Touré, 1999; Epictia columbi — Adalsteinsson et al., 2009; Epictia columbi — Wallach et al., 2014

Species of snake

The San Salvador blind snake (Epictia columbi) is a species of snake in the family Leptotyphlopidae. The species is native to the Caribbean.

== Etymology ==
The specific name, columbi, is in honor of Genoese explorer Christopher Columbus.

== Geographic range ==
Epictia columbi is endemic to San Salvador Island in The Bahamas.

== Habitat ==
The preferred natural habitats of Epictia columbi are forest and shrubland.

== Description ==
Epictia columbi may attain a total length (including tail) of 18 cm (7.1 in). It has 14 scale rows around the body. The rostral and head are brown. The body is black to blackish brown dorsally (11 scale rows), and reddish brown to yellowish brown ventrally (3 scale rows).

== Diet ==
Epictia columbi preys upon termites.

== Reproduction ==
Epictia columbi is oviparous.
