= Mitophis =

Scientific classification
- Domain: Eukaryota
- Kingdom: Animalia
- Phylum: Chordata
- Class: Reptilia
- Order: Squamata
- Suborder: Serpentes
- Family: Leptotyphlopidae
- Subfamily: Epictinae
- Genus: Mitophis; Hedges, Adalsteinsson, & Branch, 2009

Genus of snakes

Mitophis is a genus of snakes in the family Leptotyphlopidae. All of the species were previously placed in the genus Leptotyphlops. All members of this genus are endemic to the island of Hispaniola (in the Dominican Republic and Haiti).

== Species ==
The genus contains the following species:

- Mitophis asbolepis
- Mitophis calypso, Samana threadsnake
- Mitophis leptepileptus, Haitian border threadsnake
- Mitophis pyrites, Thomas's blind snake
