= Leptotyphlops brevissimus =

Scientific classification
- Domain: Eukaryota
- Kingdom: Animalia
- Phylum: Chordata
- Class: Reptilia
- Order: Squamata
- Suborder: Serpentes
- Family: Leptotyphlopidae
- Genus: Leptotyphlops
- Species: L. brevissimus

Binomial name
- Leptotyphlops brevissimus Shreve, 1964

Species of snake

Leptotyphlops brevissimus, or the Caqueta blind snake, is a species of snake in the family Leptotyphlopidae.
