= Epictia vellardi =

Scientific classification
- Kingdom: Animalia
- Phylum: Chordata
- Class: Reptilia
- Order: Squamata
- Suborder: Serpentes
- Family: Leptotyphlopidae
- Genus: Epictia
- Species: E. vellardi

Binomial name
- Epictia vellardi Laurent, 1984

Synonyms
- Leptotyphlops vellardi Laurent, 1984; Epictia vellardi — Adalsteinsson et al., 2009; Epictia vellardi — Wallach et al., 2014

Species of snake

Epictia vellardi is a species of snake in the family Leptotyphlopidae. The species is endemic to South America.

== Etymology ==
The specific name, vellardi, is in honor of French herpetologist Jehan Albert Vellard, who for most of his life lived and worked in South America.

== Geographic range ==
E. vellardi is found in Argentina, Brazil, and Paraguay.

== Reproduction ==
E. vellardi is oviparous.
