= Three-colored blind snake =

Conservation status
- Least Concern (IUCN 3.1)

Scientific classification
- Kingdom: Animalia
- Phylum: Chordata
- Class: Reptilia
- Order: Squamata
- Suborder: Serpentes
- Family: Leptotyphlopidae
- Genus: Epictia
- Species: E. tricolor

Binomial name
- Epictia tricolor (Orejas-Miranda & Zug, 1974)

Synonyms
- Leptotyphlops tricolor

Species of snake

The three-colored blind snake (Epictia tricolor) is a species of snakes in the family Leptotyphlopidae.
