= Samaná threadsnake =

Conservation status
- Critically Endangered (IUCN 3.1)

Scientific classification
- Kingdom: Animalia
- Phylum: Chordata
- Class: Reptilia
- Order: Squamata
- Suborder: Serpentes
- Family: Leptotyphlopidae
- Genus: Mitophis
- Species: M. calypso

Binomial name
- Mitophis calypso (Thomas, McDiarmid, & Thompson, 1985)

Synonyms
- Leptotyphlops calypso

Species of snake

The Samaná threadsnake (Mitophis calypso) is a critically endangered species of snake in the family Leptotyphlopidae. It is endemic to the Samaná Peninsula in the Dominican Republic on the island of Hispaniola.
