= Epictia albipuncta =

Conservation status
- Least Concern (IUCN 3.1)

Scientific classification
- Kingdom: Animalia
- Phylum: Chordata
- Class: Reptilia
- Order: Squamata
- Suborder: Serpentes
- Family: Leptotyphlopidae
- Genus: Epictia
- Species: E. albipuncta

Binomial name
- Epictia albipuncta (Burmeister, 1861)

Synonyms
- Stenostoma albifrons var. albipuncta Burmeister, 1861; Stenostoma melanoterma Cope, 1862; Stenostoma (Typhlops) undecimstriatus var. albipuncta — Jan, 1863; Stenostoma flavifrons Weyenbergh in Napp, 1876; Stenostoma melanostoma Günther, 1885 (ex errore); Stenostoma melanosterna Boulenger, 1893 (ex errore); Leptotyphlops weyrauchi Orejas-Miranda, 1964; Leptotyphlops melanotermus — Orejas-Miranda, 1964; Leptotyphlops albipuncta — J. Peters & Orejas-Miranda, 1970; Leptotyphlops albifrons — Ábalos & Mischis, 1975 (part); Leptotyphlops albipunctus — McDiarmid, Campbell & Touré, 1999; Epictia albipuncta — Adalsteisson et al., 2009; Epictia melanoterma — Wallach et al., 2014; Epictia weyrauchi — Wallach et al., 2014

Species of snake

Epictia albipuncta is a species of snake in the family Leptotyphlopidae. The species is endemic to South America.

== Geographic range ==
E. albipuncta is found in Argentina, Bolivia, southwestern Brazil, Paraguay, Uruguay, and possibly southern Peru.

== Habitat ==
The preferred natural habitats of E. albipuncta are grassland, shrubland, savanna, and forest.

== Reproduction ==
E. albipuncta is oviparous.

== Etymology ==
The specific name, weyrauchi (of the synonym Leptotyphlops weyrauchi), is in honor of German-Peruvian malacologist Wolfgang Karl Weyrauch.
