= Drewes's worm snake =

Conservation status
- Data Deficient (IUCN 3.1)

Scientific classification
- Kingdom: Animalia
- Phylum: Chordata
- Class: Reptilia
- Order: Squamata
- Suborder: Serpentes
- Family: Leptotyphlopidae
- Genus: Epacrophis
- Species: E. drewesi

Binomial name
- Epacrophis drewesi Wallach, 1996

Synonyms
- Leptotyphlops drewesi Wallach, 1996; Epacrophis drewesi — Adalsteinsson et al., 2009

Species of snake

Drewes's worm snake (Epacrophis drewesi) is a species of snake in the family Leptotyphlopidae. The species is native to East Africa.

== Etymology ==
The specific name, drewesi, is in honor of American herpetologist Robert Clifton Drewes.

== Geographic range ==
E. drewesi is endemic to Kenya.

== Habitat ==
The preferred natural habitat of E. drewesi is shrubland, at an altitude of 1,300 m (4,300 ft).

== Behavior ==
E. drewesi is nocturnal and fossorial.

== Reproduction ==
E. drewesi is oviparous.
