= Sudan blind snake =

Scientific classification
- Kingdom: Animalia
- Phylum: Chordata
- Class: Reptilia
- Order: Squamata
- Suborder: Serpentes
- Family: Leptotyphlopidae
- Genus: Tricheilostoma
- Species: T. dissimilis

Binomial name
- Tricheilostoma dissimilis (Bocage, 1886)

Synonyms
- Stenostoma dissimile; Glauconia dissimilis; Leptotyphlops dissimile; Leptotyphlops dissimilis; Myriopholis dissimilis

Species of snake

The Sudan blind snake (Tricheilostoma dissimilis) is a species of snake in the family Leptotyphlopidae.
