= Red-lined blind snake =

Conservation status
- Data Deficient (IUCN 3.1)

Scientific classification
- Kingdom: Animalia
- Phylum: Chordata
- Class: Reptilia
- Order: Squamata
- Suborder: Serpentes
- Family: Leptotyphlopidae
- Genus: Epictia
- Species: E. rubrolineata

Binomial name
- Epictia rubrolineata (Werner, 1901)

Synonyms
- Glauconia albifrons rubrolineata; Leptotyphlops rubrolineatus

Species of snake

The red-lined blind snake (Epictia rubrolineata) is a species of snake in the family Leptotyphlopidae.
