= Northern blind snake =

Scientific classification
- Kingdom: Animalia
- Phylum: Chordata
- Class: Reptilia
- Order: Squamata
- Suborder: Serpentes
- Family: Leptotyphlopidae
- Genus: Epictia
- Species: E. teaguei

Binomial name
- Epictia teaguei Orejas-Miranda, 1964

Synonyms
- Leptotyphlops teaguei Orejas-Miranda, 1964; Epictia teaguei — Adalsteinsson et al., 2009

Species of snake

The northern blind snake (Epictia teaguei) is a species of snake in the family Leptotyphlopidae. The species is endemic to Peru.

== Etymology ==
The specific name, teaguei, is in honor of Gerard Warden Teague (1885–1974), a herpetologist and ichthyologist who was born in England and worked in South America.

== Geographic range ==
E. teaguei is found in northern Peru.

== Reproduction ==
E. teaguei is oviparous.
