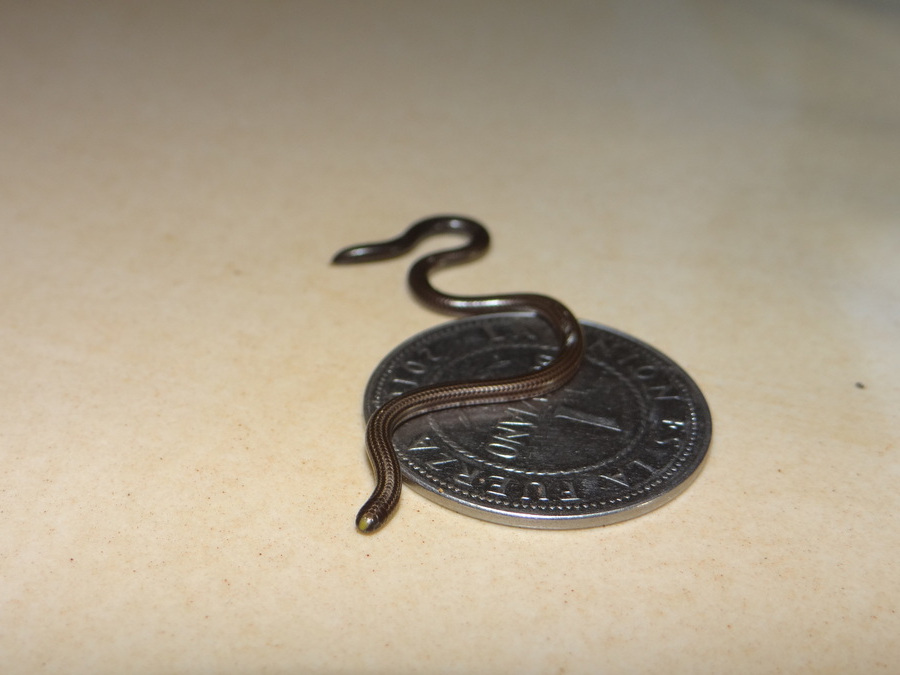

Scientific classification
- Kingdom: Animalia
- Phylum: Chordata
- Class: Reptilia
- Order: Squamata
- Suborder: Serpentes
- Family: Leptotyphlopidae
- Genus: Epictia
- Species: E. tenella

Binomial name
- Epictia tenella (Klauber, 1939)

Synonyms
- Stenostoma albifrons - Wagler, 1824; Glauconia albifrons - Boulenger, 1893; Leptotyphlops albifrons - Amaral, 1929; Leptotyphlops albifrons tenella - Roze, 1952; Leptotyphlops tenellus — Hahn, 1980; Epictia albifrons - Adalsteinsson et al., 2009; Epictia tenella - Adalsteinsson et al., 2009

= Epictia tenella =

Species of snake

Epictia tenella, also known as the Guyana blind snake, is a species of blind snake found on Trinidad in the Caribbean, and in South America, where it ranges from Guyana south to Brazil and northwestern Peru.

It can reach a length of 170 mm (6-11/16 in) snout-to-vent. It has a medium brown dorsal surface, with a paler ventral surface and a yellow tail. Its head is dark except for a white to yellow spot covering the upper half of its rostral scale.

It is mesophilic. It burrows in damp soil and rotting vegetation, and possibly in ant and termite colonies. It feeds on ants, termites, millipedes, and eggs.

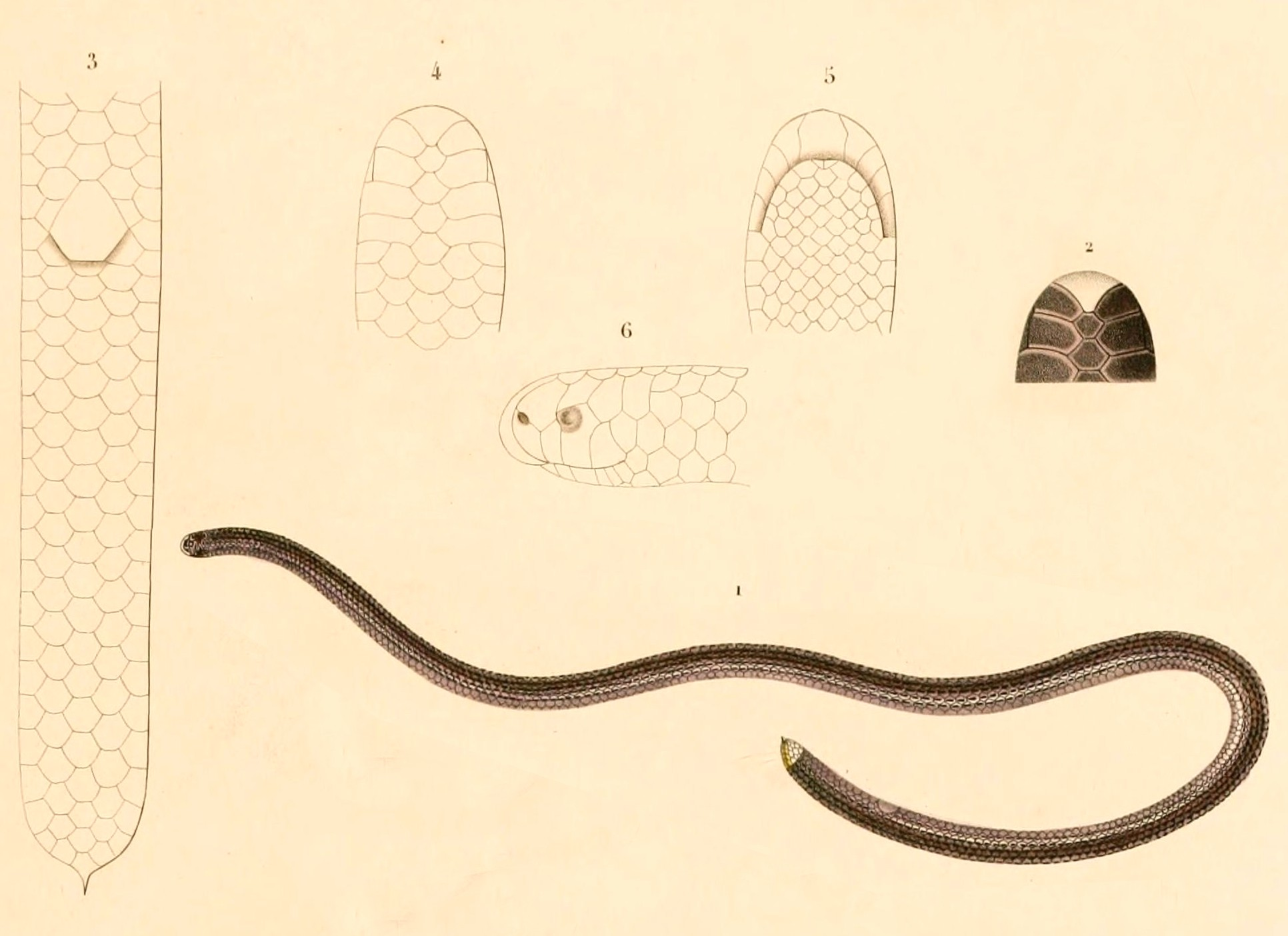

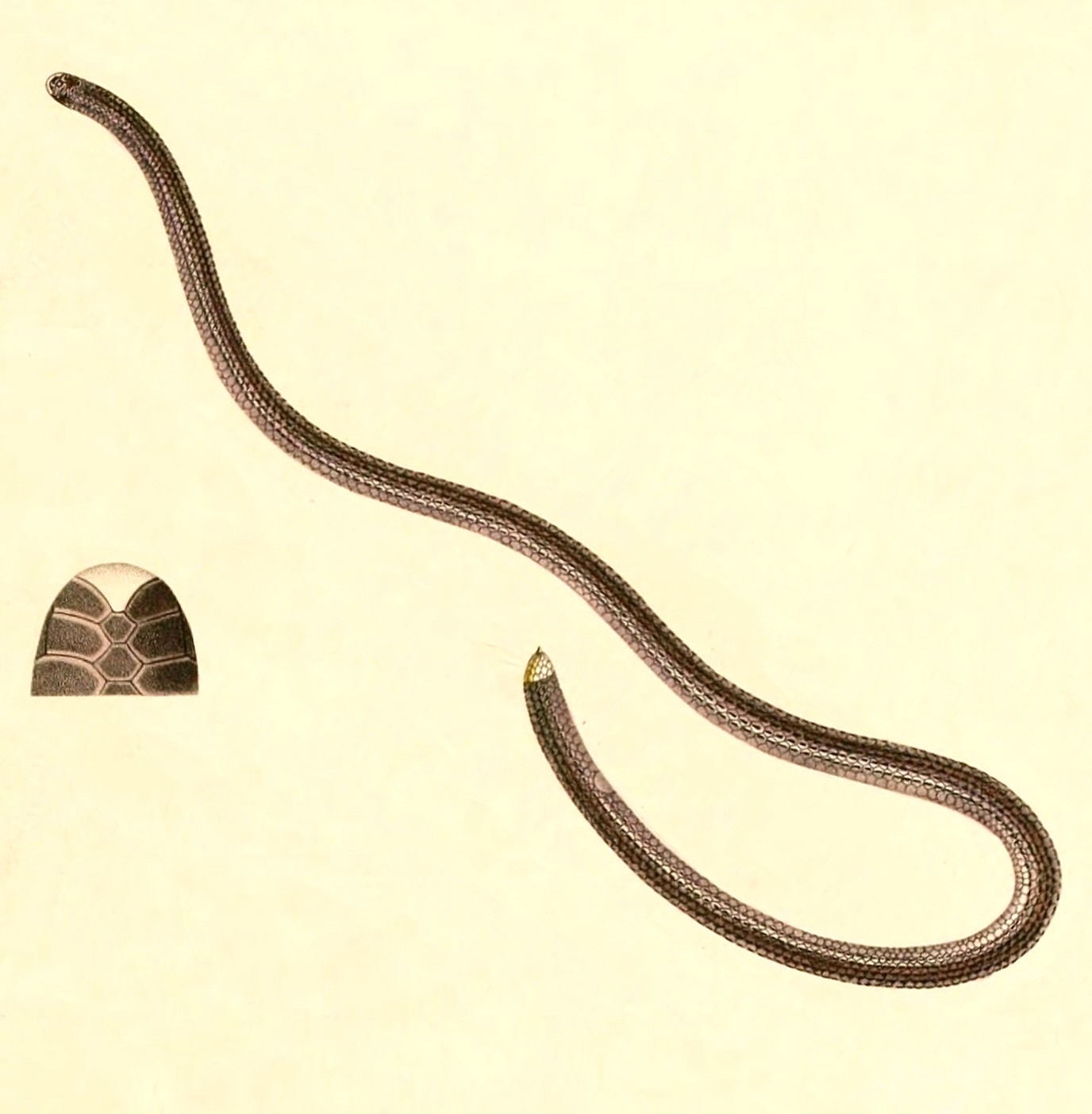

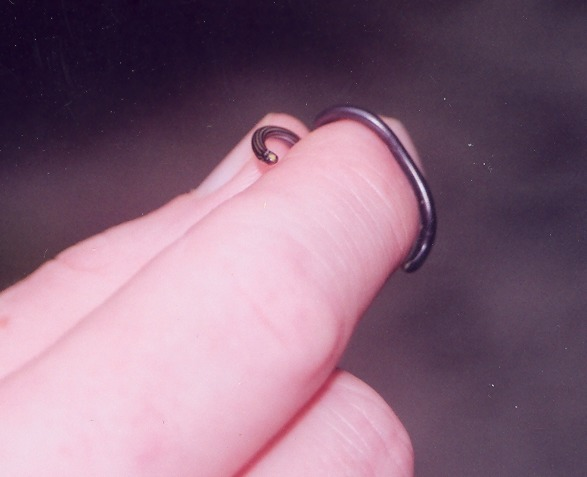
