= Epacrophis boulengeri =

Conservation status
- Data Deficient (IUCN 3.1)

Scientific classification
- Kingdom: Animalia
- Phylum: Chordata
- Class: Reptilia
- Order: Squamata
- Suborder: Serpentes
- Family: Leptotyphlopidae
- Genus: Epacrophis
- Species: E. boulengeri

Binomial name
- Epacrophis boulengeri (Boettger, 1913)

Synonyms
- Glauconia boulengeri Boettger, 1913; Leptotyphlops boulengeri — Loveridge, 1957; Epacrophis boulengeri — Adalsteinsson et al., 2009

Species of snake

Epacrophis boulengeri, also known commonly as the Manda flesh-pink blind snake and the Lamu worm snake, is a species of harmless snake in the family Leptotyphlopidae. The species is endemic to Kenya.

== Etymology ==
The specific name, boulengeri, is in honor of Belgian-British herpetologist George Albert Boulenger.

== Geographic range ==
E. boulengeri is found on Lamu Island and Manda Island.

== Habitat ==
The preferred natural habitat of E. boulengeri is coastal shrubland, at altitudes from sea level to 10 m (33 ft).

== Reproduction ==
E. boulengeri is oviparous.
