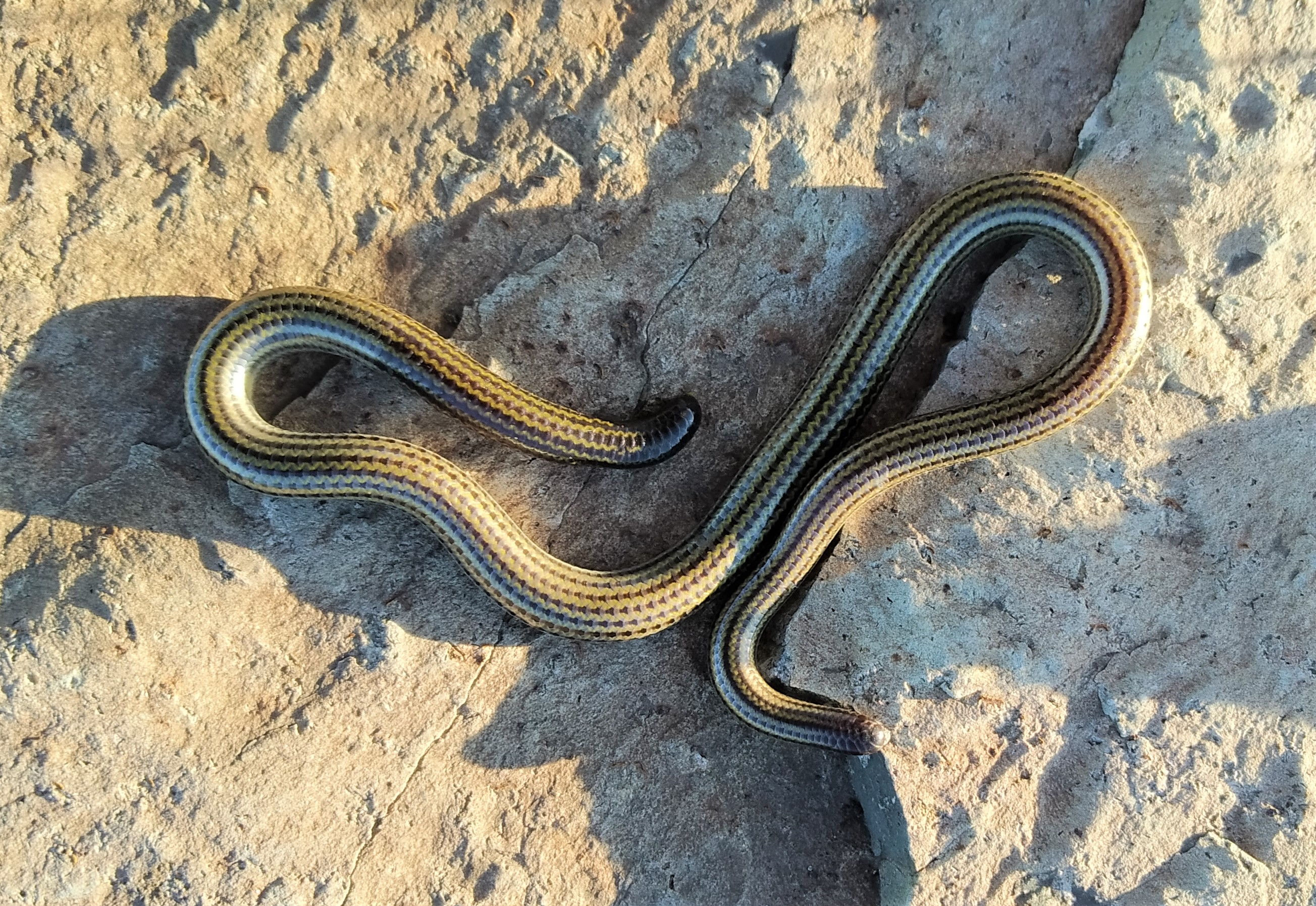

Conservation status
- Least Concern (IUCN 3.1)

Scientific classification
- Kingdom: Animalia
- Phylum: Chordata
- Class: Reptilia
- Order: Squamata
- Suborder: Serpentes
- Family: Leptotyphlopidae
- Genus: Epictia
- Species: E. munoai

Binomial name
- Epictia munoai Orejas-Miranda, 1961

Synonyms
- Leptotyphlops munoai Orejas-Miranda, 1961; Epictia munoai — Adalsteinsson et al., 2009

= Rio Grande do Sul blind snake =

Species of snake

The Rio Grande do Sul blind snake (Epictia munoai) is a species of snake in the family Leptotyphlopidae . The species is native to southern South America.

== Etymology ==
The specific name, munoai, is in honor of Uruguayan zoologist Juan Ignacio Muñoa (1925–1960).

== Geographic distribution ==
Epictia munoai is found in northern Argentina, extreme southern Brazil, and Uruguay.

== Habitat ==
The preferred natural habitats of Epictia munoai are forest and grassland.

== Reproduction ==
Epictia munoai is oviparous.
