= Myriopholis narirostris =

Conservation status
- Least Concern (IUCN 3.1)

Scientific classification
- Kingdom: Animalia
- Phylum: Chordata
- Class: Reptilia
- Order: Squamata
- Suborder: Serpentes
- Family: Leptotyphlopidae
- Genus: Myriopholis
- Species: M. narirostris

Binomial name
- Myriopholis narirostris (Peters, 1867)

Synonyms
- Stenostoma narirostre (basionym); Glauconia narirostris; Glauconia narirostre; Leptotyphlops narirostris

Species of snake

Myriopholis narirostris is a species of snake in the family Leptotyphlopidae. It is found in West Africa (Ghana, Togo, Nigeria, and possibly Guinea) and in Middle Africa (Central African Republic); the Reptile Database indicates a more extensive distribution in these areas.

Myriopholis narirostris inhabit wet savanna and dry forest.
