= Tricheilostoma broadleyi =

Conservation status
- Data Deficient (IUCN 3.1)

Scientific classification
- Kingdom: Animalia
- Phylum: Chordata
- Class: Reptilia
- Order: Squamata
- Suborder: Serpentes
- Family: Leptotyphlopidae
- Genus: Tricheilostoma
- Species: T. broadleyi

Binomial name
- Tricheilostoma broadleyi Wallach & Hahn, 1997

Synonyms
- Leptotyphlops broadleyi Wallach & Hahn, 1997; Guinea broadleyi — Adalsteinsson et al., 2009; Tricheilostoma broadleyi — Hedges, 2011

Species of snake

Tricheilostoma broadleyi is a species of snake in the family Leptotyphlopidae. The species is endemic to Ivory Coast.

== Etymology ==
The specific name, broadleyi, is in honor of herpetologist Donald G. Broadley.

== Geographic range ==
T. broadleyi is found in south-central Ivory Coast at altitudes of 300–500 m (980–1,640 ft).

== Habitat ==
The preferred habitats of T. broadleyi are forest and savanna.

== Description ==
T. broadleyi is a small species. Maximum total length (including tail) is 11.5 cm (4.5 in).

== Reproduction ==
T. broadleyi is oviparous.
