= Two-colored blind snake =

Conservation status
- Least Concern (IUCN 3.1)

Scientific classification
- Kingdom: Animalia
- Phylum: Chordata
- Class: Reptilia
- Order: Squamata
- Suborder: Serpentes
- Family: Leptotyphlopidae
- Genus: Tricheilostoma
- Species: T. bicolor

Binomial name
- Tricheilostoma bicolor (Jan, 1860)

Synonyms
- Stenostoma bicolor; Stenostoma gracile; Stenostoma brevicauda; Glauconia brevicauda; Glauconia bicolor; Glauconia gruveli; Leptotyphlops bicolor; Leptotyphlops brevicauda; Leptotyphlops brevicaudus; Guinea bicolor

Species of snake

The two-colored blind snake (Tricheilostoma bicolor) is a species of snake in the family Leptotyphlopidae. This species of snake are small, with a range usually between 15 and 20 cm in length.
