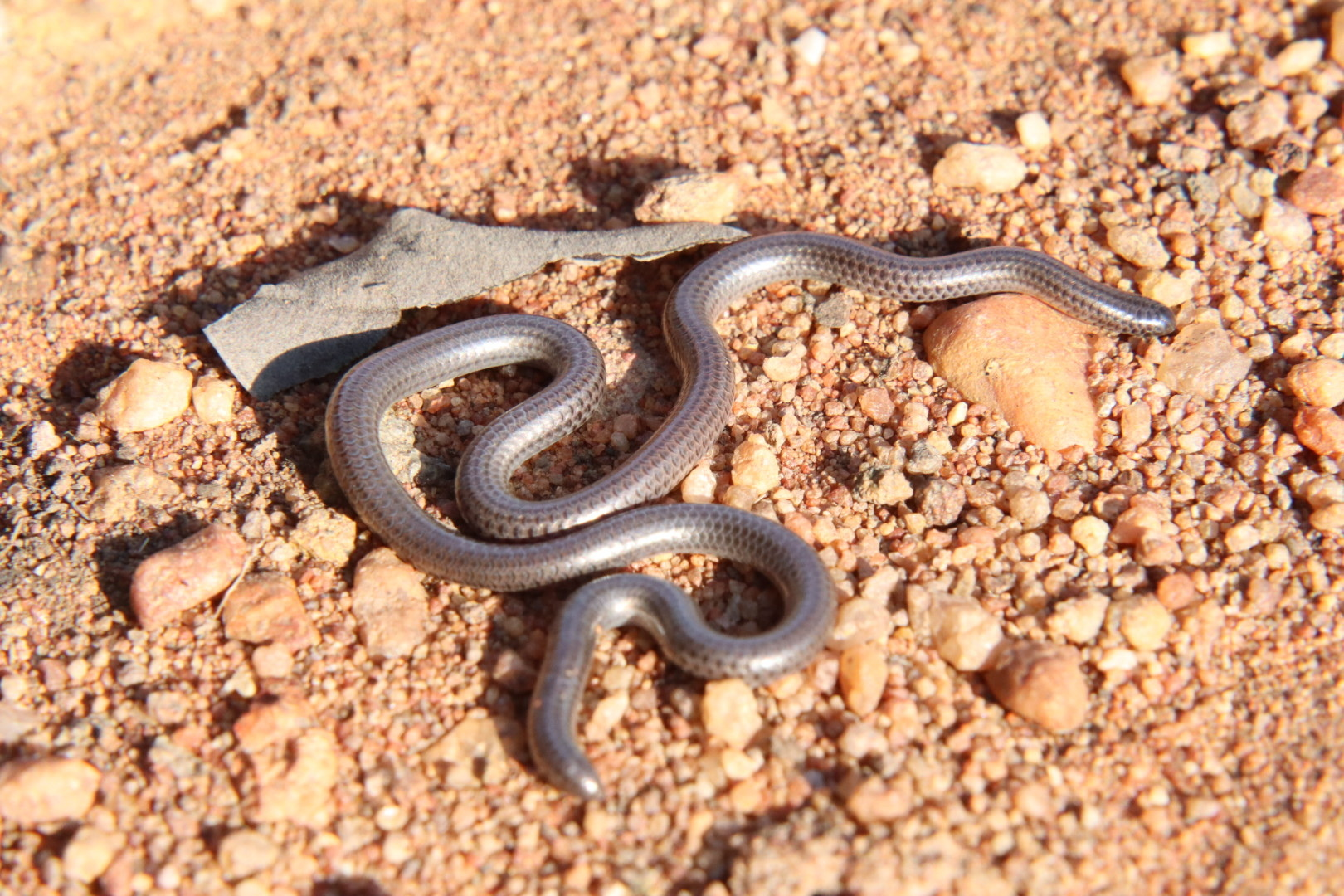
- Leptotyphlops distanti

Scientific classification
- Kingdom: Animalia
- Phylum: Chordata
- Class: Reptilia
- Order: Squamata
- Suborder: Serpentes
- Family: Leptotyphlopidae
- Subfamily: Leptotyphlopinae; Hedges, Adalsteinsson & Branch, 2009

= Leptotyphlopinae =

Subfamily of snakes

Leptotyphlopinae (commonly called slender blind snakes or threadsnakes) are a subfamily of snakes found in equatorial Africa.

== Taxonomy ==
- Genus Epacrophis [Hedges, Adalsteinsson, & Branch, 2009] (3 species)
- Genus Leptotyphlops [Fitzinger, 1843] (21 species)
- Genus Myriopholis [Hedges, Adalsteinsson, & Branch, 2009] (23 species)
- Genus Namibiana [Hedges, Adalsteinsson, & Branc, 2009] (5 species)
