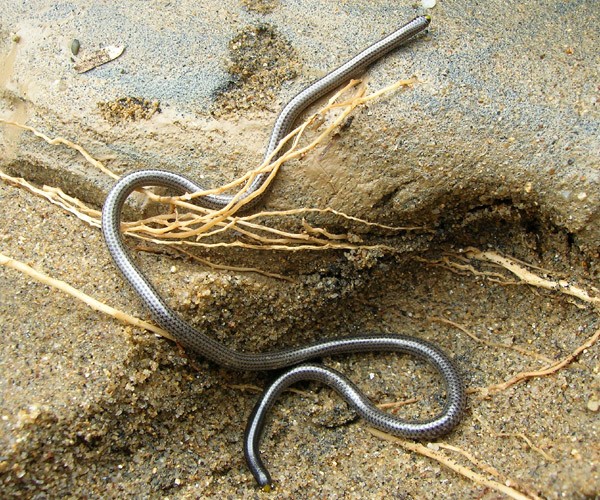

Conservation status
- Least Concern (IUCN 3.1)

Scientific classification
- Kingdom: Animalia
- Phylum: Chordata
- Class: Reptilia
- Order: Squamata
- Suborder: Serpentes
- Family: Leptotyphlopidae
- Genus: Epictia
- Species: E. subcrotilla

Binomial name
- Epictia subcrotilla (Klauber, 1939)

Synonyms
- Leptotyphlops subcrotilla; Leptotyphlops subcrotillus; Typhlops subcrotillus

= Klauber's blind snake =

Species of snake

Klauber's blind snake (Epictia subcrotilla) is a species of snake in the family Leptotyphlopidae.
