= Reticulate blind snake =

Scientific classification
- Domain: Eukaryota
- Kingdom: Animalia
- Phylum: Chordata
- Class: Reptilia
- Order: Squamata
- Suborder: Serpentes
- Family: Leptotyphlopidae
- Genus: Epacrophis
- Species: E. reticulatus

Binomial name
- Epacrophis reticulatus (Boulenger, 1906)

Synonyms
- Glauconia reticulata; Leptotyphlops reticulata; Leptotyphlops reticulatus

Species of snake

The reticulate blind snake (Epacrophis reticulatus) is a species of snake in the family Leptotyphlopidae. It is endemic to Somalia.
