= Haitian border threadsnake =

Conservation status
- Critically endangered, possibly extinct (IUCN 3.1)

Scientific classification
- Kingdom: Animalia
- Phylum: Chordata
- Class: Reptilia
- Order: Squamata
- Suborder: Serpentes
- Family: Leptotyphlopidae
- Genus: Mitophis
- Species: M. leptepileptus

Binomial name
- Mitophis leptepileptus (Thomas, McDiarmid and Thompson, 1985)

Synonyms
- Leptotyphlops leptepilepta Leptotyphlops leptipilepta Leptotyphlops leptipileptus

Species of snake

The Haitian border threadsnake (Mitophis leptepileptus) is a possibly extinct species of snake in the family Leptotyphlopidae endemic to Haiti.

== Description ==
Last seen in 1984, the species was thought to be already rare, but intensive surveys in the area have not recorded it. If it is extinct, causes are certainly due to deforestation of its habitat and agricultural activities, which have intensified since its last collection.
