= Sundevall's worm snake =

Scientific classification
- Kingdom: Animalia
- Phylum: Chordata
- Class: Reptilia
- Order: Squamata
- Suborder: Serpentes
- Family: Leptotyphlopidae
- Genus: Tricheilostoma
- Species: T. sundewalli

Binomial name
- Tricheilostoma sundewalli (Jan, 1861)

Synonyms
- Stenostoma sundewalli Jan, 1862; Glauconia sundevalli [sic] Boulenger, 1890; Leptotyphlops sundevalli — Villiers, 1950; Leptotyphlops sundewalli — McDiarmid, Campbell & Touré, 1999; Guinea sundewalli — Adalsteinsson et al., 2009; Tricheilostoma sundewalli — Hedges, 2011

Species of snake

Sundevall's worm snake (Tricheilostoma sundewalli) is a species of snake in the family Leptotyphlopidae. The species is endemic to Central Africa and West Africa.

== Etymology ==
The epithet, sundewalli, is in honor of Carl Jakob Sundevall, a Swedish zoologist.

== Geographic range ==
T. sundewalli is found in Cameroon, Central African Republic, Ghana, Nigeria, and Togo.
