= Namibiana rostrata =

Conservation status
- Least Concern (IUCN 3.1)

Scientific classification
- Kingdom: Animalia
- Phylum: Chordata
- Class: Reptilia
- Order: Squamata
- Suborder: Serpentes
- Family: Leptotyphlopidae
- Genus: Namibiana
- Species: N. rostrata

Binomial name
- Namibiana rostrata (Bocage, 1886)

Synonyms
- Stenostoma rostratum; Glauconia rostrata; Leptotyphlops rostratus

Species of snake

Namibiana rostrata, also known as Bocage's blind snake or Angolan beaked threadsnake, is a species of snake in the family Leptotyphlopidae. It is endemic to Angola.
