= Mitophis asbolepis =

Conservation status
- Endangered (IUCN 3.1)

Scientific classification
- Kingdom: Animalia
- Phylum: Chordata
- Class: Reptilia
- Order: Squamata
- Suborder: Serpentes
- Family: Leptotyphlopidae
- Genus: Mitophis
- Species: M. asbolepis

Binomial name
- Mitophis asbolepis (Thomas, McDiarmid & Thompson, 1985)

Synonyms
- Leptotyphlops asbolepis

Species of snake

Mitophis asbolepis is an endangered species of snake in the family Leptotyphlopidae. It is endemic to the Dominican Republic on the Caribbean island of Hispaniola.
