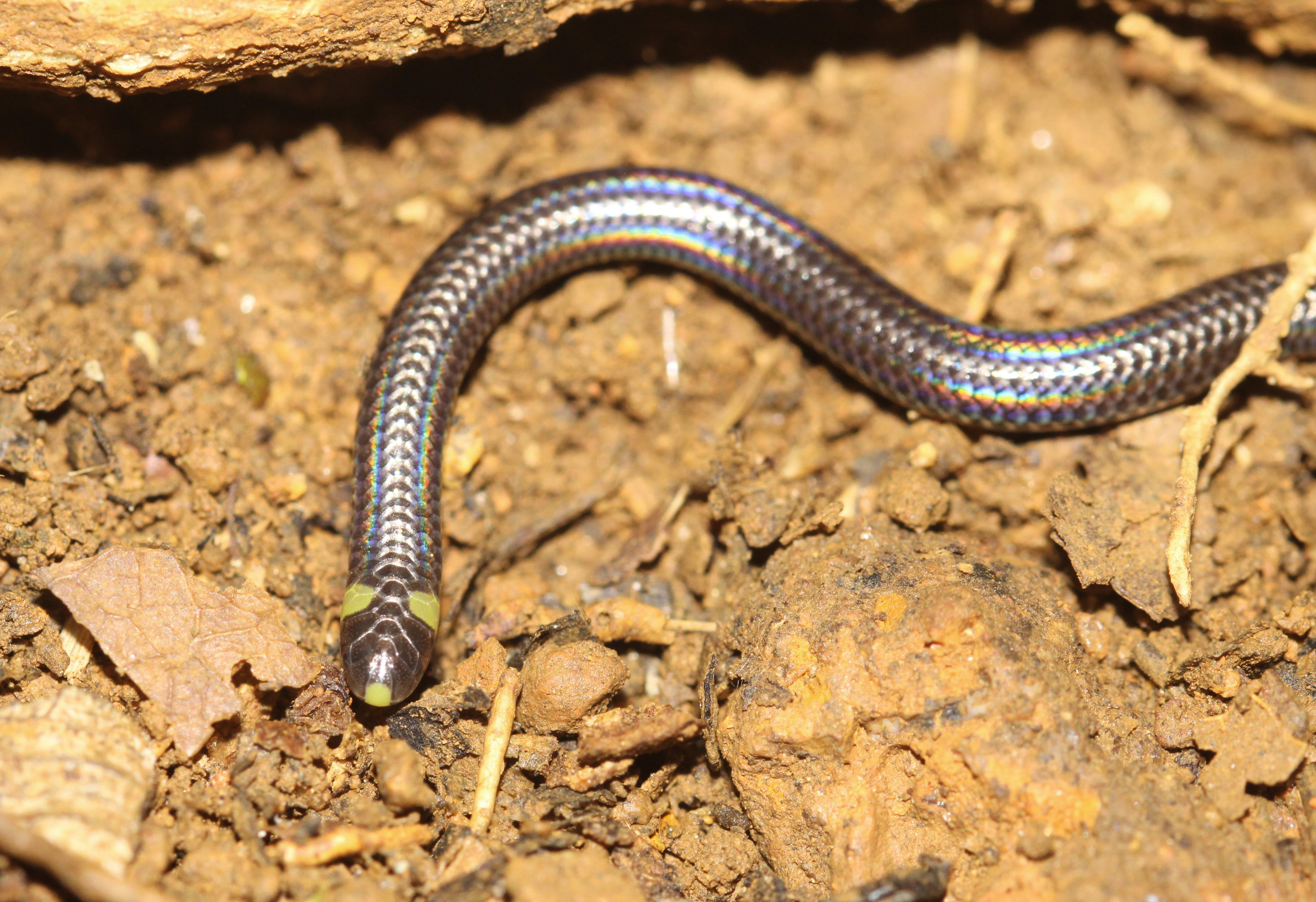
- Habrophallos collaris

Conservation status
- Least Concern (IUCN 3.1)

Scientific classification
- Kingdom: Animalia
- Phylum: Chordata
- Class: Reptilia
- Order: Squamata
- Suborder: Serpentes
- Family: Leptotyphlopidae
- Genus: Habrophallos; Martins, Koch, Pinto, Folly, Fouquet & Passos, 2020
- Species: H. collaris

Binomial name
- Habrophallos collaris (Hoogmoed, 1977)

Synonyms
- Leptotyphlops collaris Hoogmoed, 1977; Epictia collaris (Hoogmoed, 1977)

= Collared blind snake =

Species of snake

The collared blind snake (Habrophallos collaris) is a species of snake in the subfamily Epictinae of the family Leptotyphlopidae. The species is native to northeastern South America.

== Taxonomy ==
Habrophallos collaris was previously placed in the genus Leptotyphlops and then in the genus Epictia, until in 2019 a phylogenetic analysis found it couldn't be placed in either genus, and a new genus was created for it. It is monotypic in the genus Habrophallos.

== Geographic distribution ==
Habrophallos collaris is found in French Guiana and Suriname.

== Habitat ==
The preferred natural habitat of Habrophallos collaris is forest, at elevations from sea level to 450 m (1,480 ft).

== Reproduction ==
Habrophallos collaris is oviparous.
