= Guayaquila blind snake =

Conservation status
- Data Deficient (IUCN 3.1)

Scientific classification
- Kingdom: Animalia
- Phylum: Chordata
- Class: Reptilia
- Order: Squamata
- Suborder: Serpentes
- Family: Leptotyphlopidae
- Genus: Epictia
- Species: E. guayaquilensis

Binomial name
- Epictia guayaquilensis Orejas-Miranda & Peters, 1970

Synonyms
- Leptotyphlops guayaquilensis

Species of snake

The Guayaquila blind snake (Epictia guayaquilensis) is a species of snakes in the family Leptotyphlopidae.
