= Eleven-striped blind snake =

Conservation status
- Data Deficient (IUCN 3.1)

Scientific classification
- Kingdom: Animalia
- Phylum: Chordata
- Class: Reptilia
- Order: Squamata
- Suborder: Serpentes
- Family: Leptotyphlopidae
- Genus: Epictia
- Species: E. undecimstriata

Binomial name
- Epictia undecimstriata (Schlegel, 1839)

Synonyms
- Typhlops undecimstriatus; Leptotyphlops undecimstriatus

Species of snake

The eleven-striped blind snake (Epictia undecimstriata) is a species of snake in the family Leptotyphlopidae.
