= Rose blind snake =

Conservation status
- Data Deficient (IUCN 3.1)

Scientific classification
- Kingdom: Animalia
- Phylum: Chordata
- Class: Reptilia
- Order: Squamata
- Suborder: Serpentes
- Family: Leptotyphlopidae
- Genus: Epictia
- Species: E. rufidorsa

Binomial name
- Epictia rufidorsa (Taylor, 1940)

Synonyms
- Leptotyphlops rufidorsum; Leptotyphlops rufidorsus

Species of snake

The rose blind snake (Epictia rufidorsa) is a species of snake in the family Leptotyphlopidae.
