= Epictia striatula =

Scientific classification
- Domain: Eukaryota
- Kingdom: Animalia
- Phylum: Chordata
- Class: Reptilia
- Order: Squamata
- Suborder: Serpentes
- Family: Leptotyphlopidae
- Genus: Epictia
- Species: E. striatula

Binomial name
- Epictia striatula (Smith & Laufe, 1945)

Synonyms
- Leptotyphlops striatula; Leptotyphlops striatulus

Species of snake

Epictia striatula is a species of snake in the family Leptotyphlopidae.
