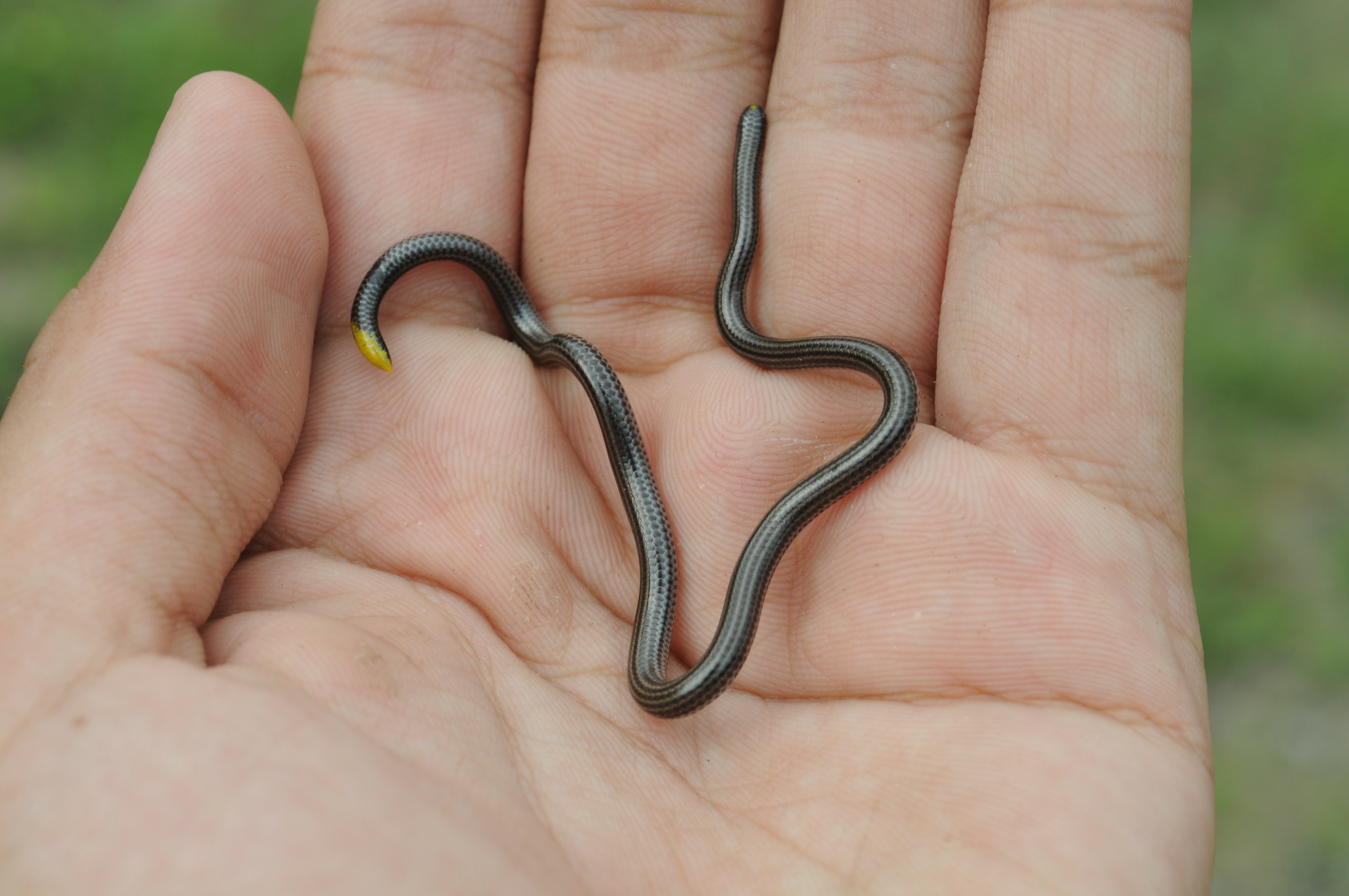

Conservation status
- Least Concern (IUCN 3.1)

Scientific classification
- Kingdom: Animalia
- Phylum: Chordata
- Class: Reptilia
- Order: Squamata
- Suborder: Serpentes
- Family: Leptotyphlopidae
- Genus: Epictia
- Species: E. goudotii

Binomial name
- Epictia goudotii (A.M.C. Duméril & Bibron, 1844)

Synonyms
- Stenostoma goudotii A.M.C. Duméril & Bibron, 1844; Glauconia goudotii — Boulenger, 1893; Leptotyphlops goudotii — Amaral, 1929; Epictia goudotii — Adalsteinsson et al., 2009

= Epictia goudotii =

Species of snake

Epictia goudotii, also known commonly as the black blind snake and the southern Caribbean threadsnake, is a species of snake in the family Leptotyphlopidae. The species is native to Middle America.

== Etymology ==
The specific name, goudotii, is in honor of French naturalist Justin-Marie Goudot.

== Geographic range ==
In Central America, Epictia goudotii is found in western Panama.

In South America, it is found in western Colombia, northern Venezuela, and on associated islands.

== Habitat ==
The preferred natural habitat of Epictia goudotii is forest, at altitudes from sea level to 600 m (2,000 ft), but it has also been found in agricultural clearings.

== Description ==
A small species, Epictia goudotii usually has a total length (including a short tail) of about 11 cm (4.3 in), but may grow to 16 cm (6.3 in). There are 14 scale rows around the body, throughout the whole length of the body, and there are 10 scale rows around the middle of the tail.

== Behavior ==
Epictia goudotii is terrestrial and fossorial.

== Diet ==
Epictia goudotii preys upon ants and termites.

== Reproduction ==
Epictia goudotii is oviparous.
