= Epictia albifrons =

Scientific classification
- Kingdom: Animalia
- Phylum: Chordata
- Class: Reptilia
- Order: Squamata
- Suborder: Serpentes
- Family: Leptotyphlopidae
- Genus: Epictia
- Species: E. albifrons

Binomial name
- Epictia albifrons (Wagler, 1824)

Synonyms
- Stenostoma albifrons; Typhlops albifrons; Glauconia albifrons; Leptotyphlops albifrons

Species of snake

Epictia albifrons, known as Wagler's blind snake or silver snake, is a species of snake in the family Leptotyphlopidae of blind snakes native to Argentina (Tucuman, Salta), Bolivia, Brazil and South-Africa.
