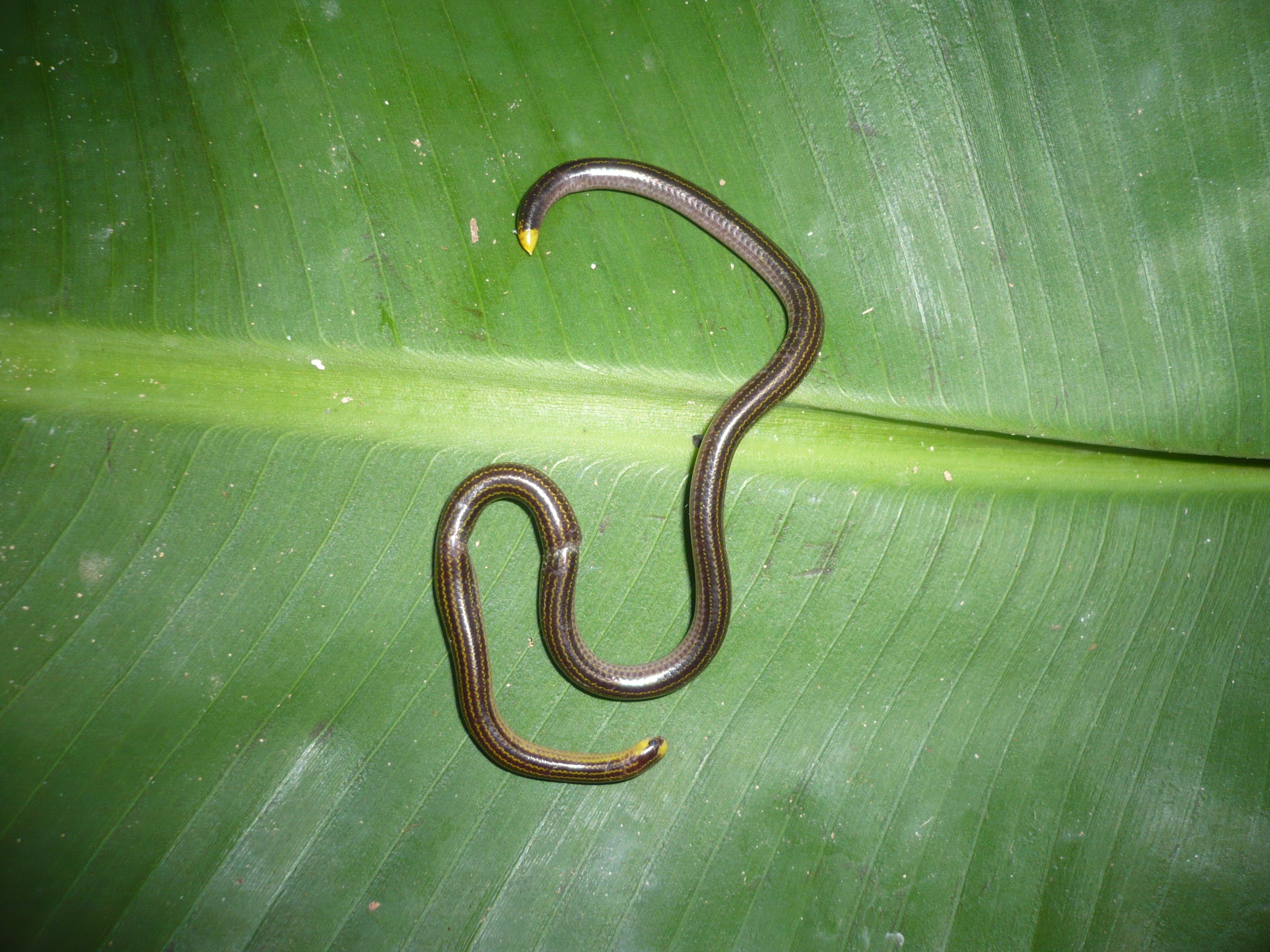

Conservation status
- Least Concern (IUCN 3.1)

Scientific classification
- Kingdom: Animalia
- Phylum: Chordata
- Class: Reptilia
- Order: Squamata
- Suborder: Serpentes
- Family: Leptotyphlopidae
- Genus: Epictia
- Species: E. diaplocia

Binomial name
- Epictia diaplocia (Orejas-Miranda, 1969)

Synonyms
- Leptotyphlops diaplocius

= Common Peru blind snake =

Species of snake

The common Peru blind snake (Epictia diaplocia) is a species of snake in the family Leptotyphlopidae.
