= Tricheilostoma =

Scientific classification
- Kingdom: Animalia
- Phylum: Chordata
- Class: Reptilia
- Order: Squamata
- Suborder: Serpentes
- Family: Leptotyphlopidae
- Subfamily: Epictinae
- Genus: Tricheilostoma; Jan, 1860

Genus of snakes

Tricheilostoma is a genus of snakes in the family Leptotyphlopidae. The genus is native to Africa. All of the member species of Tricheilostoma were previously placed in the genus Leptotyphlops.

== Species ==
The genus Tricheilostoma contains the following six species.

- Tricheilostoma bicolor (Jan, 1860) – two-colored blind snake
- Tricheilostoma broadleyi (Wallach & Hahn, 1997)
- Tricheilostoma dissimilis (Bocage, 1886) – Sudan blind snake
- Tricheilostoma greenwelli (Wallach & Boundy, 2005)
- Tricheilostoma kongoensis (J.-F. Trape, 2019)
- Tricheilostoma sundewalli (Jan, 1862) – Sundevall's worm snake

Nota bene: A binomial authority in parentheses indicates that the species was originally described in a genus other than Tricheilostoma.
