= Peru blind snake =

Conservation status
- Data Deficient (IUCN 3.1)

Scientific classification
- Kingdom: Animalia
- Phylum: Chordata
- Class: Reptilia
- Order: Squamata
- Suborder: Serpentes
- Family: Leptotyphlopidae
- Genus: Epictia
- Species: E. peruviana

Binomial name
- Epictia peruviana (Orejas-Miranda, 1969)

Synonyms
- Leptotyphlops peruvianus

Species of snake

The Peru blind snake (Epictia peruviana) is a species of snake in the family Leptotyphlopidae.
