= Damara threadsnake =

Scientific classification
- Domain: Eukaryota
- Kingdom: Animalia
- Phylum: Chordata
- Class: Reptilia
- Order: Squamata
- Suborder: Serpentes
- Family: Leptotyphlopidae
- Genus: Namibiana
- Species: N. labialis

Binomial name
- Namibiana labialis (Sternfeld, 1908)

Synonyms
- Glauconia labialis; Leptotyphlops labialis

Species of snake

The Damara threadsnake (Namibiana labialis) is a species of snake in the family Leptotyphlopidae. It is found in northwestern Namibia and southern Angola.
