= Epacrophis =

Scientific classification
- Domain: Eukaryota
- Kingdom: Animalia
- Phylum: Chordata
- Class: Reptilia
- Order: Squamata
- Suborder: Serpentes
- Family: Leptotyphlopidae
- Subfamily: Leptotyphlopinae
- Genus: Epacrophis; Hedges, Adalsteinsson, & Branch, 2009

Genus of snakes

Epacrophis is a genus of snakes in the family Leptotyphlopidae. All of the species were previously placed in the genus Leptotyphlops.

== Species ==
The genus contains the following species:

- Epacrophis boulengeri, Manda flesh-pink blind snake, Lamu worm snake
- Epacrophis drewesi, Drewes's worm snake
- Epacrophis reticulatus, reticulate blind snake
