= Epictia ater =

Conservation status
- Least Concern (IUCN 3.1)

Scientific classification
- Kingdom: Animalia
- Phylum: Chordata
- Class: Reptilia
- Order: Squamata
- Suborder: Serpentes
- Family: Leptotyphlopidae
- Genus: Epictia
- Species: E. ater

Binomial name
- Epictia ater Taylor, 1940

Synonyms
- Leptotyphlops ater; Leptotyphlops nasalis; Leptotyphlops albifrons ater; Leptotyphlops albifrons nasalis; Leptotyphlops bakewelli; Leptotyphlops phenops; Leptotyphlops goudotii ater; Leptotyphlops goudotii phenops; Epictia nasalis; Epictia goudotii ater; Crishagenus nasalis

Species of snake

Epictia ater, or black blind snake, is a species of snake in the family Leptotyphlopidae.
