= Epictia signata =

Conservation status
- Data Deficient (IUCN 3.1)

Scientific classification
- Kingdom: Animalia
- Phylum: Chordata
- Class: Reptilia
- Order: Squamata
- Suborder: Serpentes
- Family: Leptotyphlopidae
- Genus: Epictia
- Species: E. signata

Binomial name
- Epictia signata (Jan, 1861)

Synonyms
- Stenostoma signatum Jan, 1861; Glauconia signata — Boulenger, 1893; Leptotyphlops signatus — McDiarmid, Campbell & Touré, 1999; Epictia signata — Adalsteinsson et al., 2009

Species of snake

Epictia signata, or the South American blind snake, is a species of snake in the family Leptotyphlopidae. The species is native to northwestern South America.

== Description ==
Epictia signata is brown dorsally, and it is light brown ventrally. The rostral and the end of the tail are white.

The holotype has a total length (tail included) of 130 mm (5.1 in), and a body diameter of 2 mm (0.079 in). There are 14 rows of scales around the body.

== Geographic distribution ==
Epictia signata is found in Colombia, Ecuador, and Venezuela.

The type locality given by Jan is "patrie inconnue" [= homeland unknown].

== Reproduction ==
Epictia signata is oviparous.
