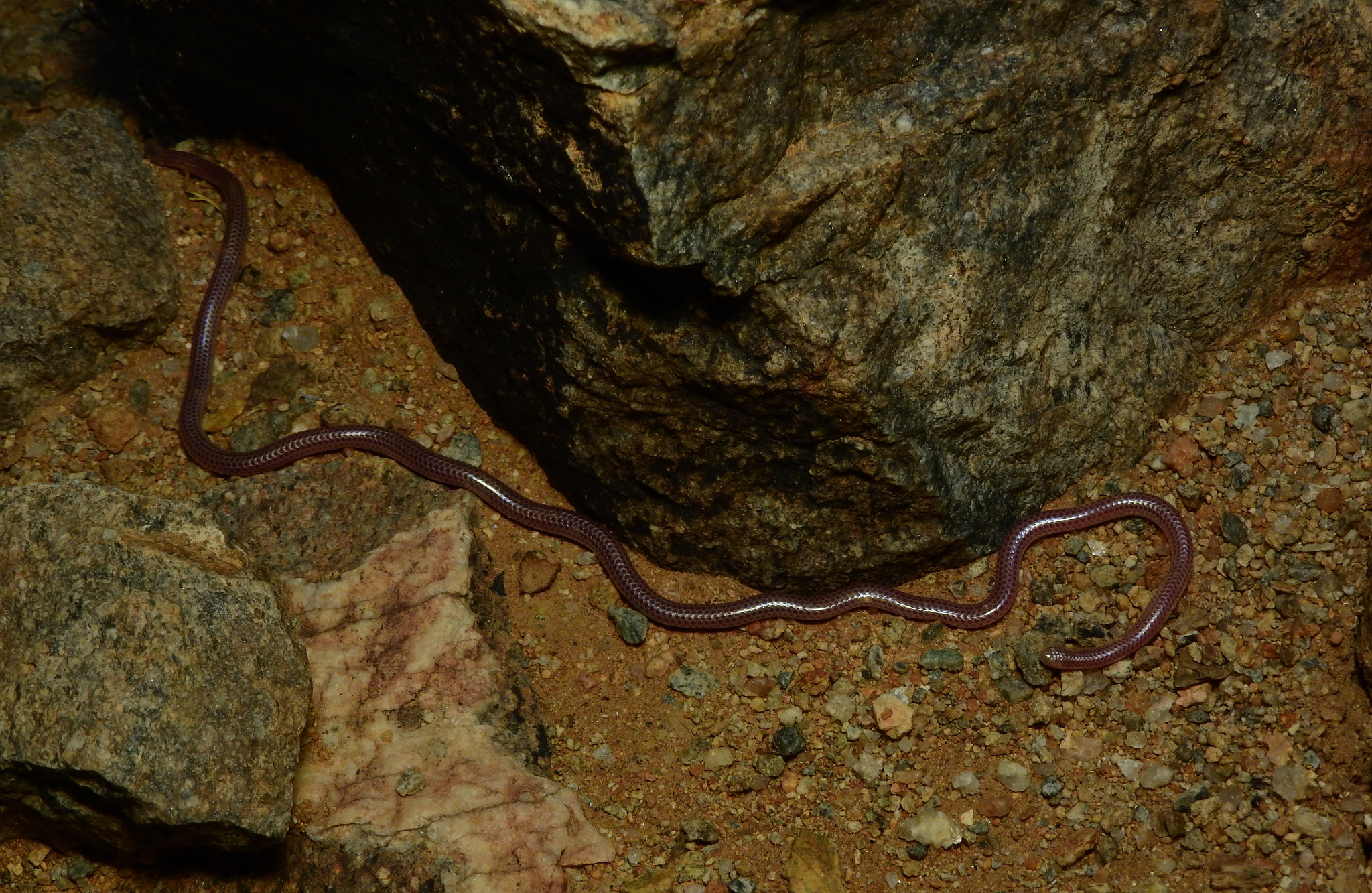
- Namibiana occidentalis

Scientific classification
- Domain: Eukaryota
- Kingdom: Animalia
- Phylum: Chordata
- Class: Reptilia
- Order: Squamata
- Suborder: Serpentes
- Family: Leptotyphlopidae
- Subfamily: Leptotyphlopinae
- Genus: Namibiana; Hedges, Adalsteinsson, & Branch, 2009

= Namibiana =

Genus of snakes

Namibiana is a genus of snakes in the family Leptotyphlopidae. All of the species were previously placed in the genus Leptotyphlops.

== Species ==
The genus contains the following species:

- Namibiana gracilior, slender threadsnake, slender worm snake
- Namibiana labialis, Damara threadsnake
- Namibiana latifrons, Benguela worm snake, Sternfeld's threadsnake
- Namibiana occidentalis, western threadsnake, western worm snake
- Namibiana rostrata, Bocage's blind snake, Angolan beaked threadsnake
