= Cairo blind snake =

Conservation status
- Least Concern (IUCN 3.1)

Scientific classification
- Kingdom: Animalia
- Phylum: Chordata
- Class: Reptilia
- Order: Squamata
- Suborder: Serpentes
- Family: Leptotyphlopidae
- Genus: Myriopholis
- Species: M. cairi

Binomial name
- Myriopholis cairi (A.M.C. Duméril & Bibron, 1844)

Synonyms
- Stenostoma cairi A.M.C. Duméril & Bibron, 1844; Stenostoma fitzingeri Jan, 1861; Glauconia cairi — Boulenger, 1893; Leptotyphlops cairi — Parker, 1932; Myriopholis cairi — Adalsteinsson et al., 2009

Species of snake

The Cairo blind snake (Myriopholis cairi) is a species of non-venomous snake in the family Leptotyphlopidae. The species is endemic to Africa.

== Geographic range ==
M. cairi is found in Egypt, Eritrea, Ethiopia, Mauritania, Niger, Somalia, Sudan, Uganda, and possibly in Libya.

== Etymology ==
The specific name, cairi, commemorates the city of Cairo, Egypt. The specific name of the junior synonymy, Stenostoma fitzingeri, commemorates Austrian herpetologist Leopold Fitzinger.

== Habitat ==
The preferred natural habitat of M. cairi is shrubland, at altitudes from sea level to 400 m (1,300 ft), and it is also found in moist cultivated areas.

== Diet ==
M. cairi preys upon small invertebrates.

== Reproduction ==
M. cairi is oviparous.
