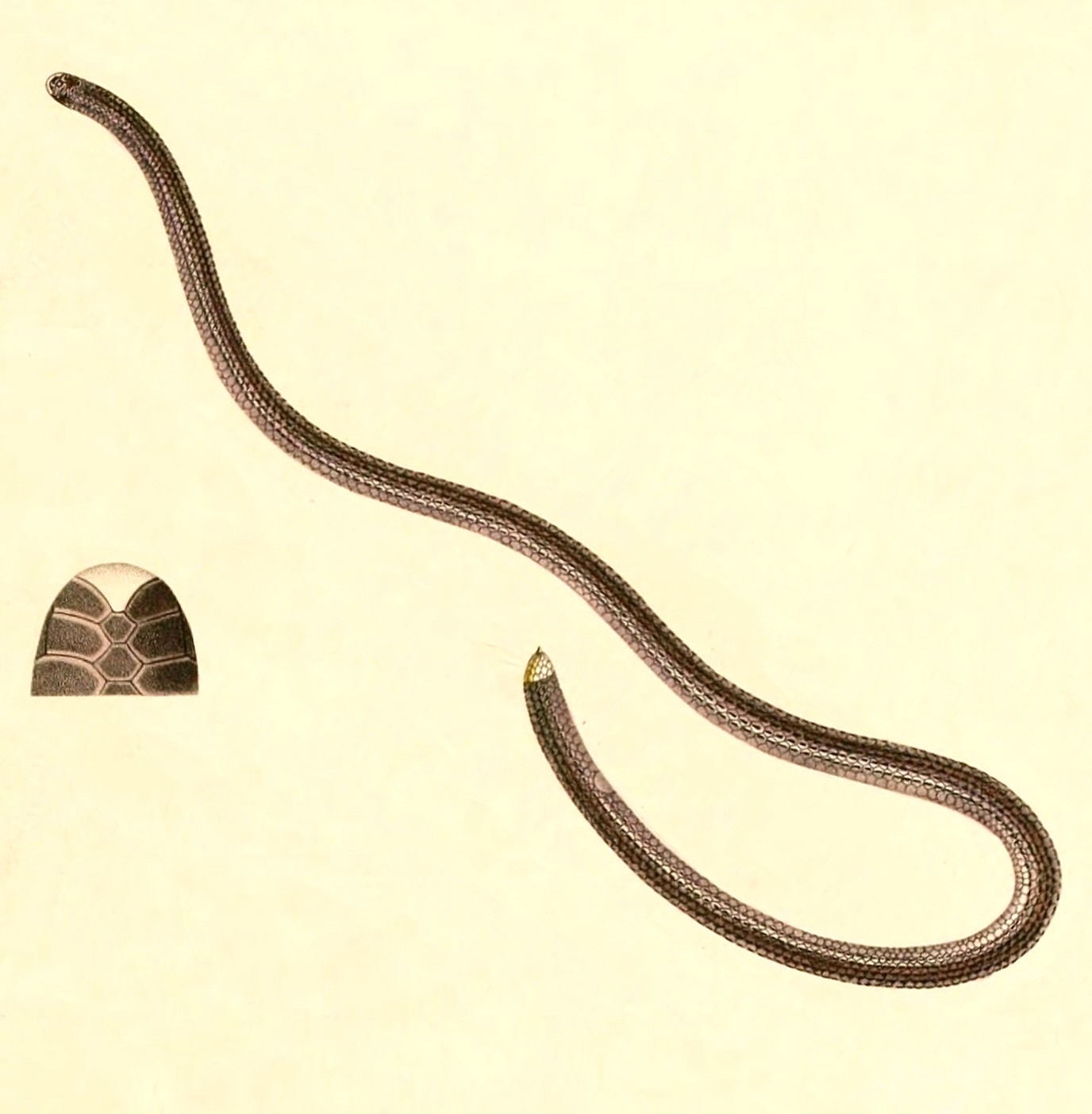
- Epictia tenella

Scientific classification
- Kingdom: Animalia
- Phylum: Chordata
- Class: Reptilia
- Order: Squamata
- Suborder: Serpentes
- Family: Leptotyphlopidae
- Subfamily: Epictinae
- Genus: Epictia; Gray, 1845

= Epictia =

Epictia Temporal range: Greenlandian–Present

Genus of snakes

Epictia is a genus of snakes in the family Leptotyphlopidae. The genus is native to South America, Central America, and Mexico.

== Taxonomy ==
Prior to 2009 all species of Epictia were placed in the genus Leptotyphlops.

== Species ==
The genus Epictia contains the following 44 species which are recognized as being valid:

- Epictia albifrons (Wagler, 1824)
- Epictia albipuncta (Burmeister, 1861)
- Epictia alfredschmidti (Lehr, Wallach, G. Köhler & Aguilar, 2002)
- Epictia amazonica (Orejas-Miranda, 1969)
- Epictia antoniogarciai C. Koch, Venegas & Böhme, 2015
- Epictia ater (Taylor, 1940)
- Epictia australis (Freiberg & Orejas-Miranda, 1968) – Freiberg's blind snake
- Epictia bakewelli (J. Oliver, 1937) – Bakewell's blind snake
- Epictia borapeliotes (Vanzolini, 1996)
- Epictia clinorostris Arredondo & Zaher, 2010
- Epictia columbi (Klauber, 1939) – San Salvador blind snake
- Epictia diaplocia (Orejas-Miranda, 1969) – common Peru blind snake
- Epictia fallax (W. Peters, 1858)
- Epictia goudotii (A.M.C. Duméril & Bibron, 1844)
- Epictia guayaquilensis Orejas-Miranda & J. Peters, 1970
- Epictia hobartsmithi Esqueda, Schlüter, C. Machado, Castelaín & Natera-Mumaw, 2015
- Epictia magnamaculata (Taylor, 1940)
- Epictia martinezi Wallach, 2016
- Epictia melanura (Schmidt & W. Walker, 1943) – dark blind snake
- Epictia munoai (Orejas-Miranda, 1961) – Rio Grande do Sul blind snake
- Epictia pauldwyeri Wallach, 2016
- Epictia peruviana (Orejas-Miranda, 1969) – Peru blind snake
- Epictia phenops (Cope, 1875)
- Epictia resetari Wallach, 2016
- Epictia rioignis C. Koch, A. Martins & Schweiger, 2019
- Epictia rubrolineata (F. Werner, 1901) – red-lined blind snake
- Epictia rufidorsa (Taylor, 1940) – rose blind snake
- Epictia schneideri Wallach, 2016
- Epictia septemlineata C. Koch, Venegas & Böhme, 2015
- Epictia signata (Jan, 1861)
- Epictia striatula (H.M. Smith & Laufe, 1945)
- Epictia subcrotilla (Klauber, 1939) – Klauber's blind snake
- Epictia teaguei (Orejas-Miranda, 1964) – northern blind snake
- Epictia tenella (Klauber, 1939)
- Epictia tesselata (Tschudi, 1845) – Tschudi's blind snake
- Epictia tricolor (Orejas-Miranda & Zug, 1974) – three-colored blind snake
- Epictia undecimstriata (Schlegel, 1839) – eleven-striped blind snake
- Epictia unicolor (F. Werner, 1913)
- Epictia vanwallachi C. Koch, Venegas & Böhme, 2015
- Epictia vellardi (Laurent, 1984)
- Epictia venegasi C. Koch, Santa Cruz & H. Cárdenas, 2016
- Epictia vindumi Wallach, 2016
- Epictia vonmayi C. Koch, Santa Cruz & H. Cárdenas, 2016
- Epictia wynni Wallach, 2016

Nota bene: A binomial authority in parentheses indicates that the species was originally described in a genus other than Epictia.
