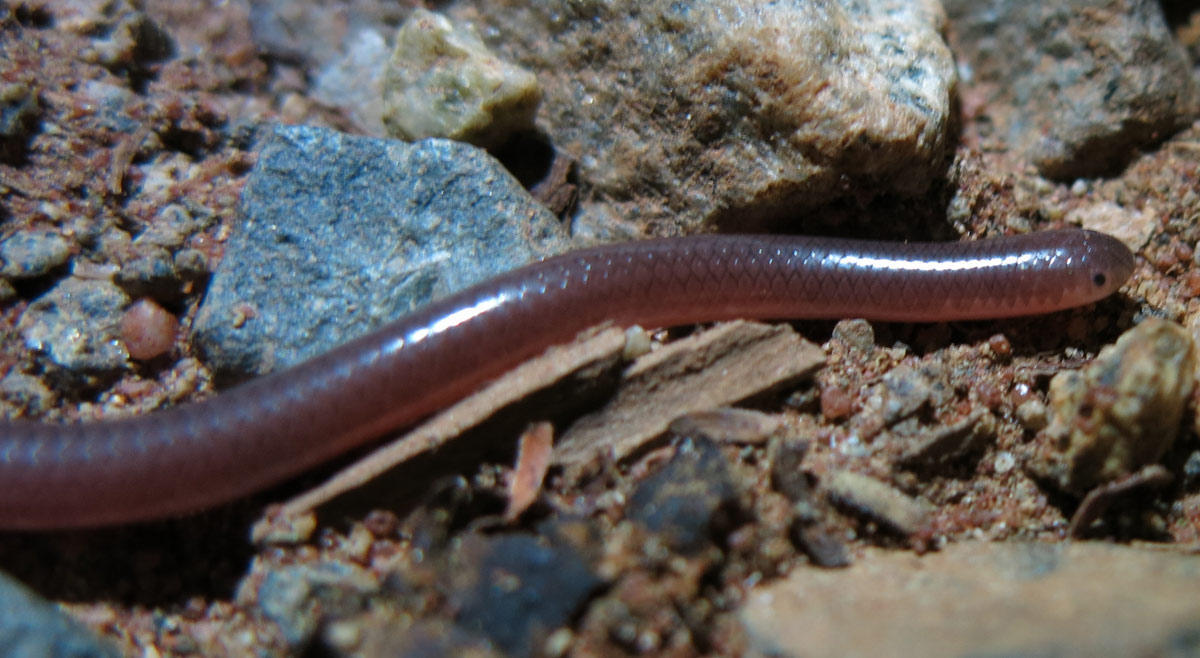
- Myriopholis longicauda

Scientific classification
- Domain: Eukaryota
- Kingdom: Animalia
- Phylum: Chordata
- Class: Reptilia
- Order: Squamata
- Suborder: Serpentes
- Family: Leptotyphlopidae
- Genus: Myriopholis
- Species: M. longicauda

Binomial name
- Myriopholis longicauda (Peters, 1854)

Synonyms
- Stenosoma longicaudum Peters, 1854; Glauconia longicauda; Boulenger, 1890; Leptotyphlops longicauda; Loveridge, 1953; Leptotyphlops longicaudus; Auerbach, 1987; Myriopholis longicauda; Adalsteinsson et al., 2009

= Long-tailed threadsnake =

Species of snake

The long-tailed threadsnake (Myriopholis longicauda) is a species of snake in the family Leptotyphlopidae. It is endemic to Africa.

== Geographic range ==
It is found in eastern Botswana, Kenya, Mozambique, southern Somalia, northeastern South Africa, Tanzania, Zambia, and Zimbabwe.
