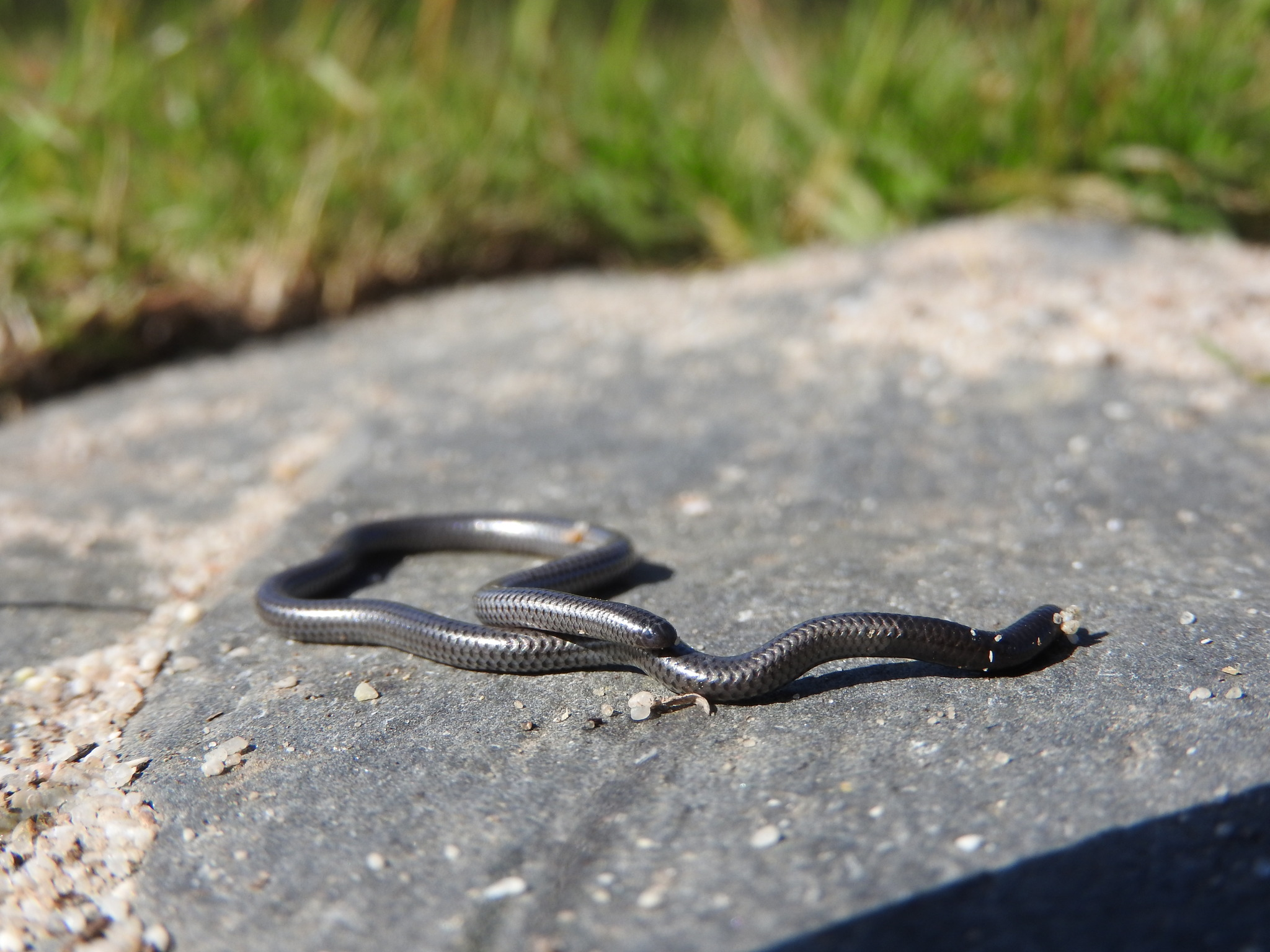
- Black threadsnake

Conservation status
- Least Concern (IUCN 3.1)

Scientific classification
- Kingdom: Animalia
- Phylum: Chordata
- Class: Reptilia
- Order: Squamata
- Suborder: Serpentes
- Family: Leptotyphlopidae
- Genus: Leptotyphlops
- Species: L. nigricans

Binomial name
- Leptotyphlops nigricans (Schlegel, 1839)

Synonyms
- Typhlops nigricans Schlegel, 1839; Leptotyphlops nigricans – Fitzinger, 1843; Stenostoma nigricans – Duméril & Bibron, 1844; Glauconia nigricans – Gray, 1845; Leptotyphlops nigricans – Schmidt, 1923

= Leptotyphlops nigricans =

Species of snake

Leptotyphlops nigricans, also known as the black threadsnake or black worm snake, is a species of snake in the family Leptotyphlopidae. It is endemic to Africa.

== Geographic range ==
This species is endemic to the Western and Eastern Cape Provinces of South Africa.

== Description ==
Leptotyphlops nigricans is black or dark brown, both dorsally and ventrally. In some specimens the scales are lighter-edged.

It is a small and thin species of snake. Adults may attain a snout-vent length (SVL) of 196 millimetres (7.7 in).

The scales are arranged in 14 rows around the body at midbody.

Snout rounded. Supraocular small. Rostral as broad or slightly broader than the nasal, extending as far as the anterior border of the eye. Nasal completely divided. Ocular bordering the lip between two upper labials, the anterior of which is very small. Five lower labials. Diameter of the body 40 to 53 times in the total length. Length of tail 8 to 13 times in the total length.
