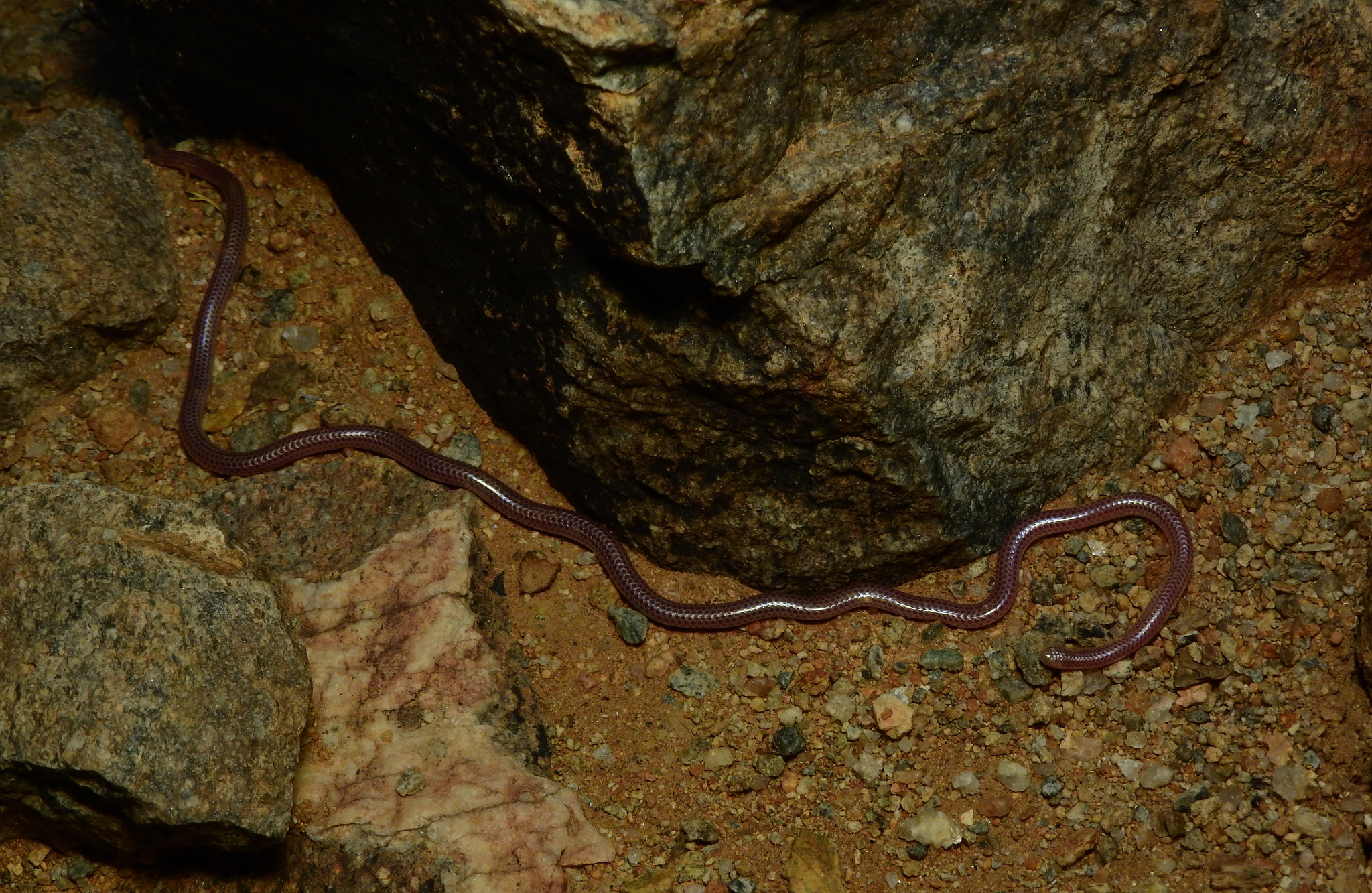

Scientific classification
- Domain: Eukaryota
- Kingdom: Animalia
- Phylum: Chordata
- Class: Reptilia
- Order: Squamata
- Suborder: Serpentes
- Family: Leptotyphlopidae
- Genus: Namibiana
- Species: N. occidentalis

Binomial name
- Namibiana occidentalis FitzSimons, 1962

Synonyms
- Leptotyphlops occidentalis

= Namibiana occidentalis =

Species of snake

Namibiana occidentalis, also known as the western threadsnake or western worm snake, is a species of snake in the family Leptotyphlopidae. It is found in Namibia and north-western South Africa.
