= Rhinoguinea =

Scientific classification
- Kingdom: Animalia
- Phylum: Chordata
- Class: Reptilia
- Order: Squamata
- Suborder: Serpentes
- Family: Leptotyphlopidae
- Genus: Rhinoguinea; Trape, 2014
- Species: R. magna

Binomial name
- Rhinoguinea magna Trape, 2014

Genus of snakes

Rhinoguinea is a monotypic genus of snakes in the family Leptotyphlopidae. It contains one species, Rhinoguinea magna. It is endemic to southern Mali.
