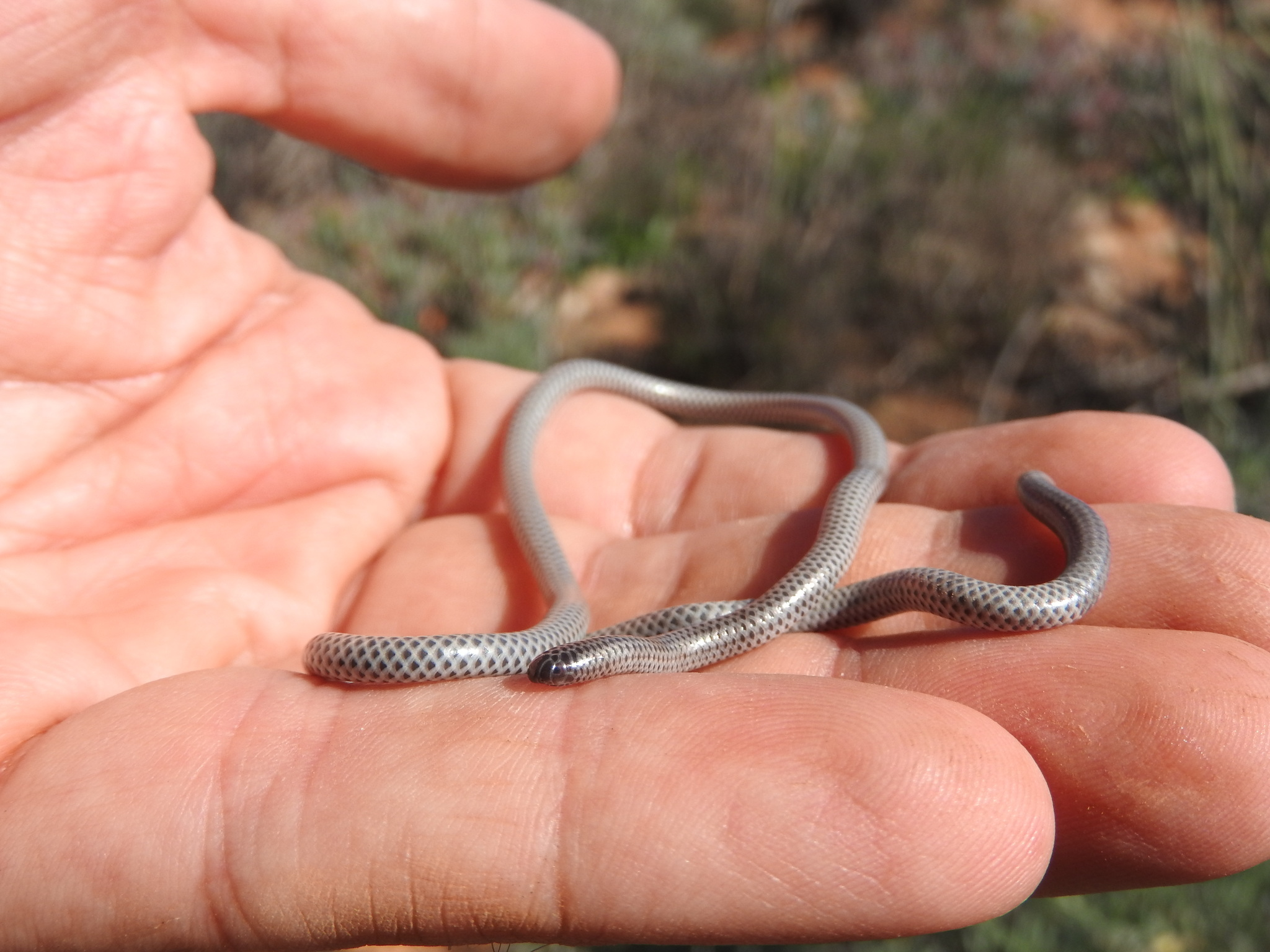
- Namibiana gracilior

Conservation status
- Least Concern (IUCN 3.1)

Scientific classification
- Kingdom: Animalia
- Phylum: Chordata
- Class: Reptilia
- Order: Squamata
- Suborder: Serpentes
- Family: Leptotyphlopidae
- Genus: Namibiana
- Species: N. gracilior

Binomial name
- Namibiana gracilior (Boulenger, 1910)

Synonyms
- Glauconia gracilior; Leptotyphlops gracilior

= Slender threadsnake =

Species of snake

The slender thread snake or slender worm snake (Namibiana gracilior) is a species of snake in the family Leptotyphlopidae. It is found in southern Namibia and western South Africa.
