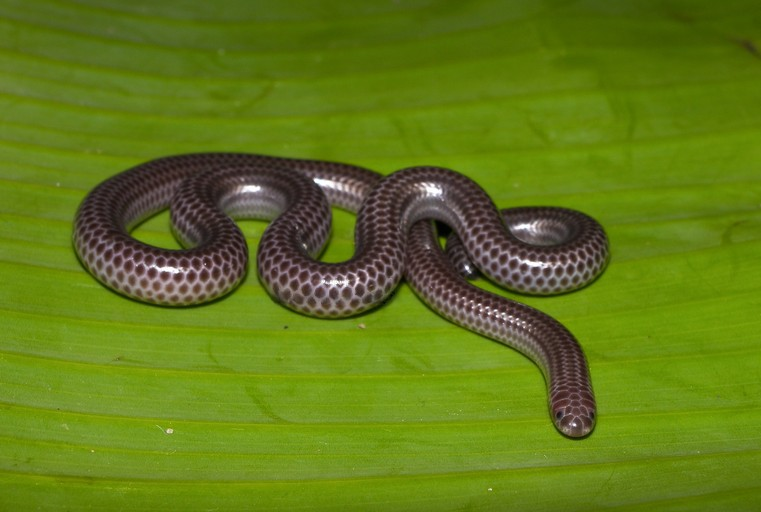

Scientific classification
- Kingdom: Animalia
- Phylum: Chordata
- Class: Reptilia
- Order: Squamata
- Suborder: Serpentes
- Family: Leptotyphlopidae
- Genus: Trilepida
- Species: T. macrolepis

Binomial name
- Trilepida macrolepis (W. Peters, 1857)

Synonyms
- Stenostoma macrolepis W. Peters, 1857; Stenostoma (Tricheilostoma) macrolepis — Jan, 1861; Glauconia macrolepis — Boulenger, 1893; Leptotyphlops macrolepis — Ruthven, 1922; Leptotyphlops ihlei Brongersma, 1933; Tricheilostoma macrolepis — Adalsteinsson et al., 2009; Trilepida macrolepis — Hedges, 2011

= Big-scaled blind snake =

Species of snake

The big-scaled blind snake (Trilepida macrolepis) is a species of snake in the family Leptotyphlopidae. The species is endemic to southern Central America and northern South America.

== Taxonomy ==
T. macrolepis is the type species of the genus Trilepida.

== Geographic range ==
T. macrolepis has been reported from Brazil, Colombia, Ecuador, the Guianas, Panama, and Venezuela.

== Description ==
T. macrolepis has 14 rows of scales around the body. Each scale has a lighter border. The centers of the scales in the seven dorsal rows are uniform dark brown to black. The centers of the scales in the seven ventral rows are light brown to brown.

== Reproduction ==
T. macrolepis is oviparous.
