= Rhinoleptus =

Conservation status
- Least Concern (IUCN 3.1)

Scientific classification
- Kingdom: Animalia
- Phylum: Chordata
- Class: Reptilia
- Order: Squamata
- Suborder: Serpentes
- Family: Leptotyphlopidae
- Genus: Rhinoleptus; Orejas-Miranda, Roux-Estève & Guibé, 1970
- Species: R. koniagui

Binomial name
- Rhinoleptus koniagui (Villiers, 1956)

Synonyms
- Typhlops koniagui Villiers, 1956; Leptotyphlops koniagui — Guibé, Roux-Estève & Villiers, 1967; Rhinoleptus koniagui — Orejas-Miranda, Roux-Estève & Guibé, 1970

Genus of snakes

Rhinoleptus koniagui, also known commonly as Villiers's blind snake, is a species of snake in the family Leptotyphlopidae. The species, which is indigenous to West Africa, is monotypic in the genus Rhinoleptus. It is among the smallest snakes in the world. There are no subspecies that are recognized as being valid.

== Geographic range ==
R. koniagui is found in West Africa in Senegal (Bonghari and Casamance) and Guinea (Kouroussa and Youkounkoun). The type locality given is "Guinée Francaise: Youkounkoun" (Guinea).

== Habitat ==
The preferred natural habitats of R. koniagui are forest and savanna, at altitudes from sea level to 450 m (1,480 ft).

== Reproduction ==
R. koniagui is oviparous.
