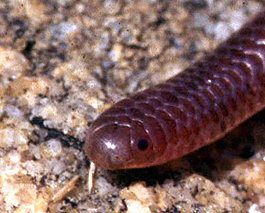
- Western blind snake, Rena humilis

Scientific classification
- Kingdom: Animalia
- Phylum: Chordata
- Class: Reptilia
- Order: Squamata
- Suborder: Serpentes
- Infraorder: Scolecophidia
- Family: Leptotyphlopidae; Stejneger, 1892

Subfamilies
- Epictinae; Leptotyphlopinae

Synonyms
- Stenostomata — Ritgen, 1828; Stenostomi — Wiegmann & Ruthe, 1832; Stenostomina — Bonaparte, 1845; Stenostomatidae — Günther, 1885; Stenostomidae — Cope, 1886; Glauconiidae — Boulenger, 1890; Leptotyphlopidae Stejneger, 1892

= Leptotyphlopidae =

Family of snakes

The Leptotyphlopidae (commonly called slender blind snakes or thread snakes) are a family of small snakes found in North America, South America, Africa and Asia. All are fossorial and adapted to burrowing, feeding on ants and termites. Two subfamilies are recognized.

== Description ==
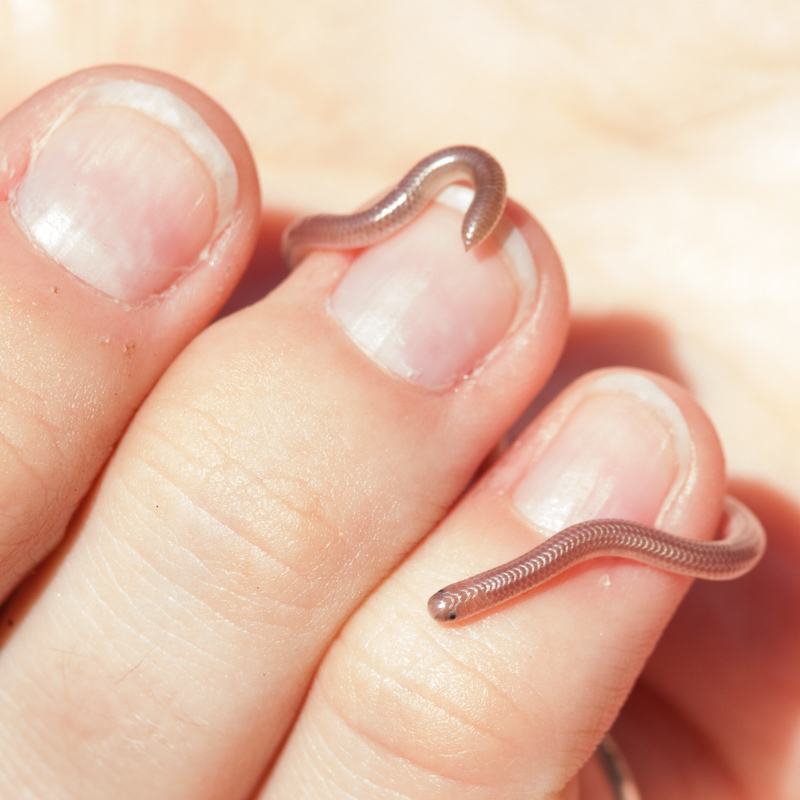
Texas blind snake (Rena dulcis) on a hand

Relatively small snakes, leptotyphlopids rarely exceed 30 cm (12 in) in length; only Trilepida macrolepis and Leptotyphlops occidentalis grow larger. The cranium and upper jaws are immobile and no teeth are in the upper jaw. The lower jaw consists of a much elongated quadrate bone, a tiny compound bone, and a relatively larger dentary bone. The body is cylindrical with a blunt head and a short tail. The scales are highly polished. The pheromones they produce protect them from attack by termites. Among these snakes is what is believed to be the world's smallest: L. carlae (Hedges, 2008).

== Geographic range ==
Leptotyphlopids are found in Africa, western Asia from Turkey to eastern India, on Socotra Island, and from the southwestern United States south through Mexico and Central America to South America, though not in the high Andes. In Pacific South America, they occur as far south as southern coastal Peru, and on the Atlantic side as far as Uruguay and Argentina. In the Caribbean, they are found on the Bahamas, Hispaniola, Jamaica and the Lesser Antilles.

== Habitat ==
Leptotyphlopids occur in a wide variety of habitats from arid areas to rainforest, and are known to occur near ant and termite nests.

== Feeding ==
The diets of leptotyphlopids consist mostly of termite or ant larvae, pupae, and adults. Most species suck out the contents of insect bodies and discard the exoskeleton.

== Reproduction ==
Snakes in the family Leptotyphlopidae are oviparous.

== Taxonomy ==
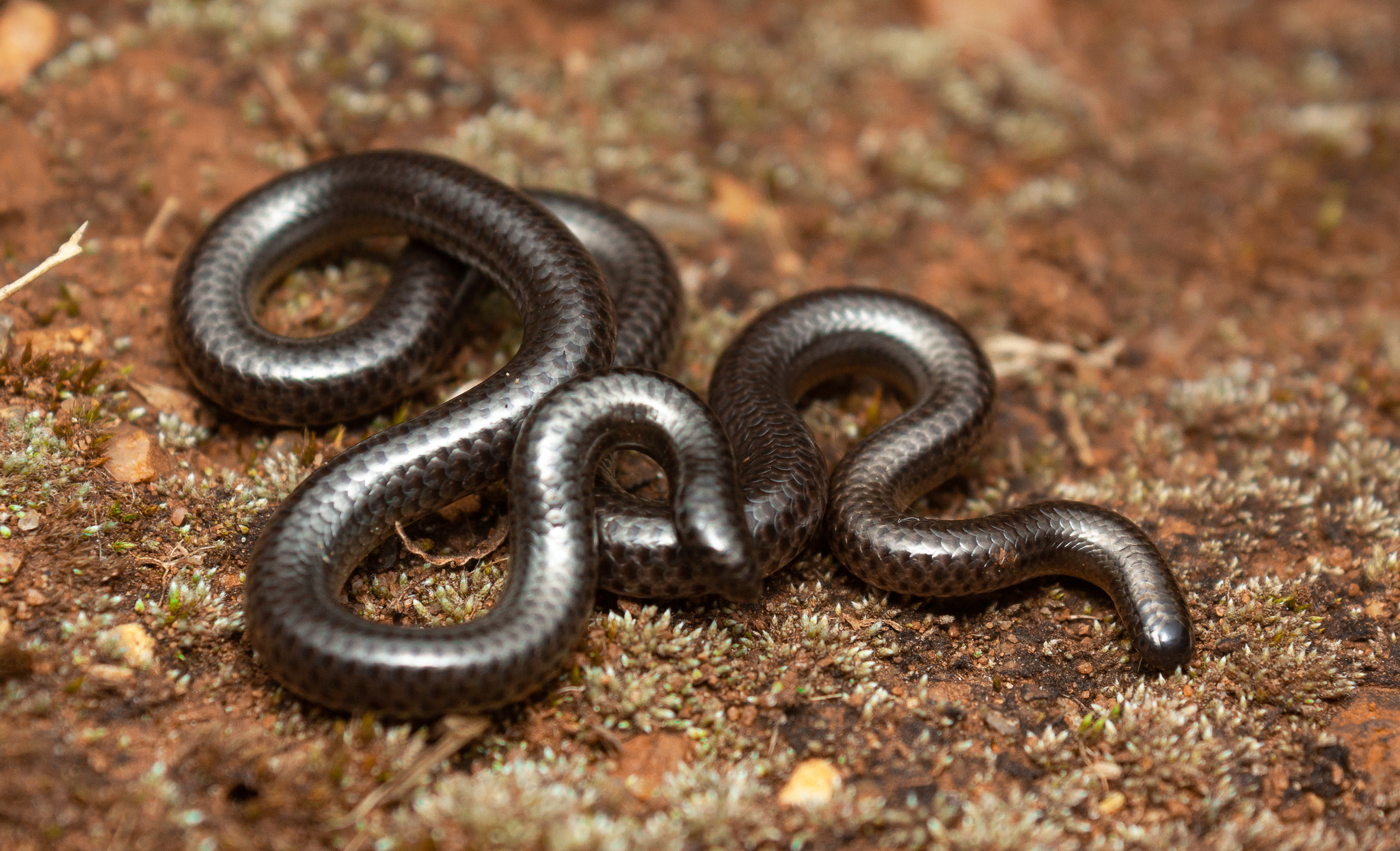
Forest thread snake (Leptotyphlops sylvicolus), from the type genus Leptotyphlops

- Subfamily Leptotyphlopinae
  - Genus Epacrophis Hedges, Adalsteinsson & Branch, 2009 (3 species)
  - Genus Leptotyphlops Fitzinger, 1843 (21 species)
  - Genus Myriopholis Hedges, Adalsteinsson & Branch, 2009 (23 species)
  - Genus Namibiana Hedges, Adalsteinsson & Branch, 2009 (5 species)
- Subfamily Epictinae
  - Tribe Epictini, New World snakes
    - Subtribe Epictina
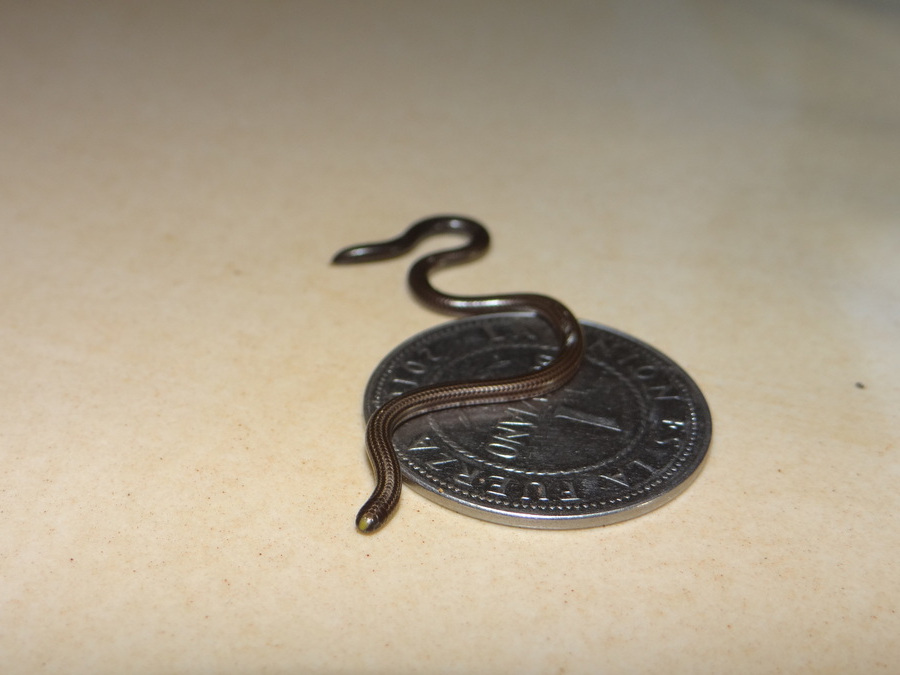
      - Epictia tenella, with coin for scale
        Genus Epictia Gray, 1845 (44 species)
      - Genus Habrophallos Martins, Koch, Pinto, Folly, Fouquet & Passos, 2020 (monotypic, collared blind snake)
      - Genus Siagonodon W. Peters, 1881 (4 species)
    - Subtribe Renina
      - Genus Rena Baird & Girard, 1853 (10 species)
      - Genus Trilepida Hedges, 2011 (14 species)
    - Subtribe Tetracheilostomina
      - Genus Mitophis Hedges, Adalsteinsson & Branch, 2009 (4 species)
      - Genus Tetracheilostoma Jan, 1861 (3 species)
  - Tribe Rhinoleptini, African snakes
    - Genus Tricheilostoma Jan, 1860 (5 species)
    - Genus Rhinoleptus Orejas-Miranda, Roux-Estève & Guibé, 1970 (monotypic, Villiers's blind snake)
    - Genus Rhinoguinea J.-F. Trape, 2014 (monotypic, Rhinoguinea magna)

== Gallery ==
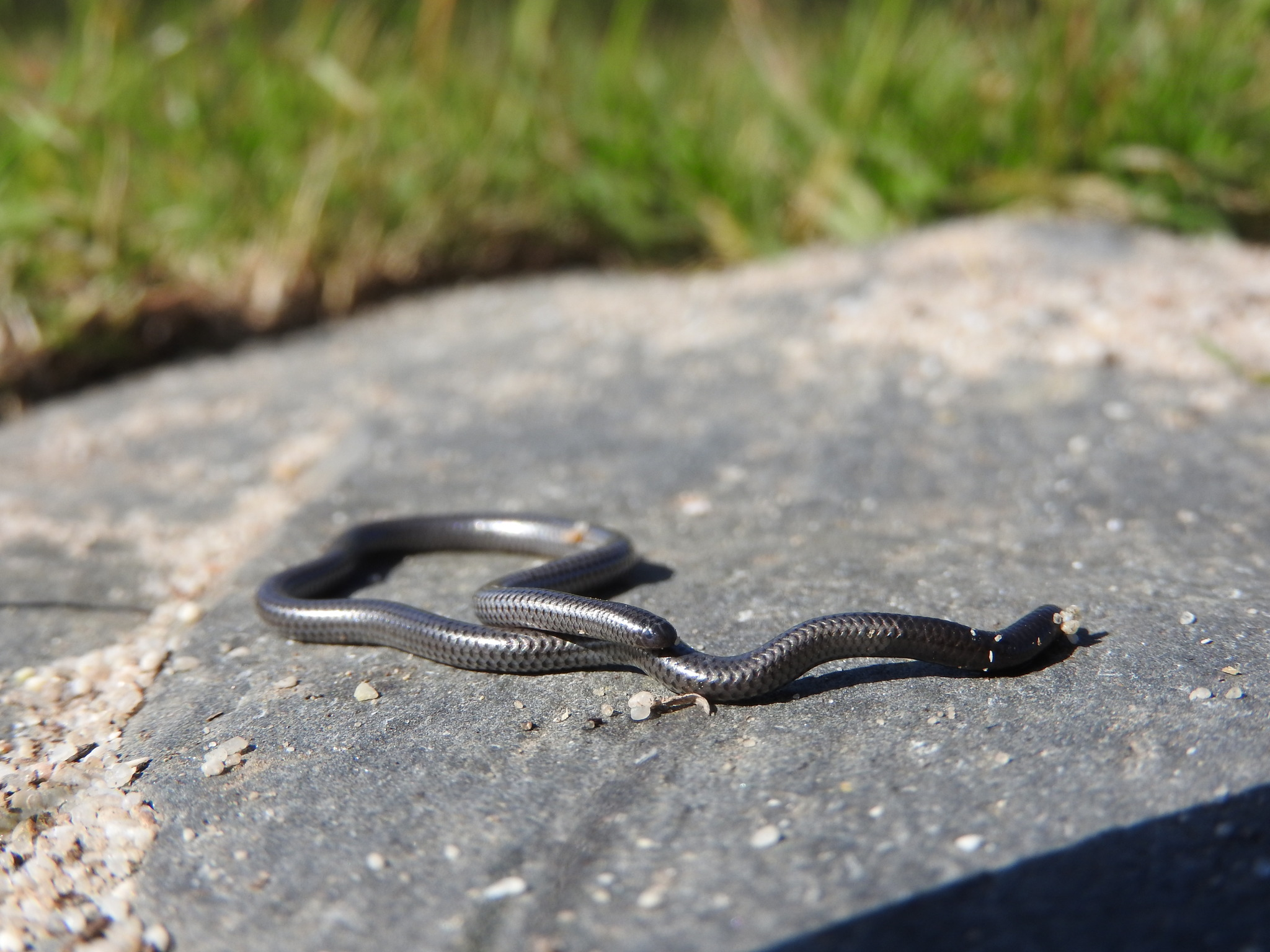
Leptotyphlops type species; Black thread snake (L. nigricans)

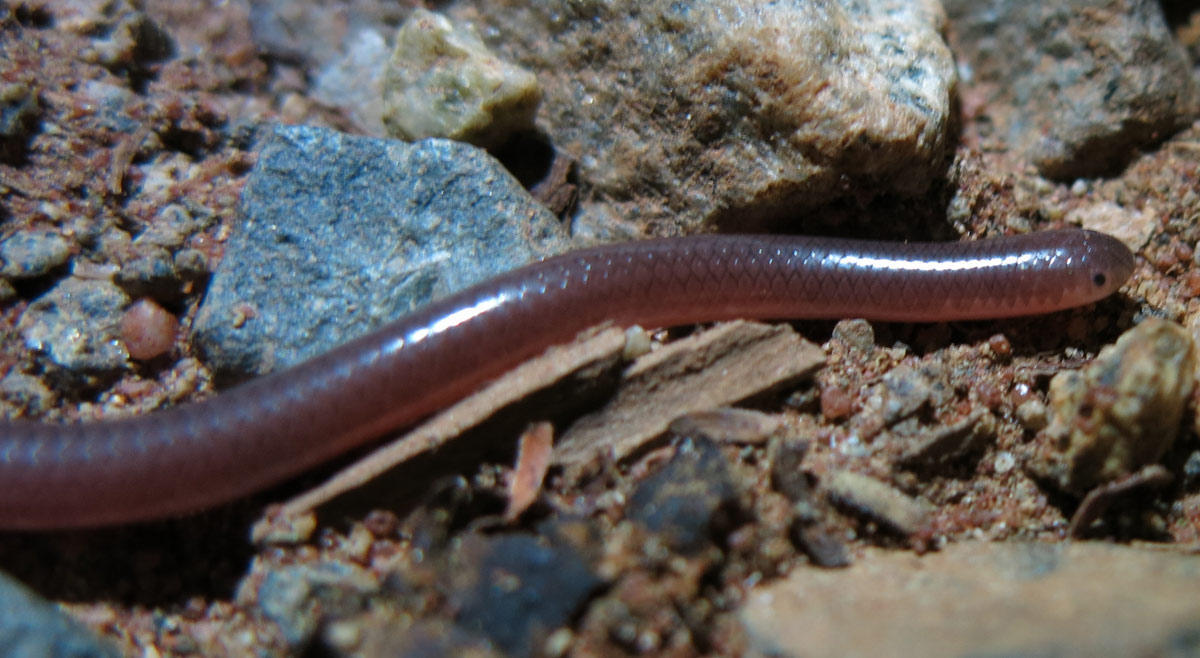
Myriopholis type species; Long-tailed thread snake (M. longicauda)

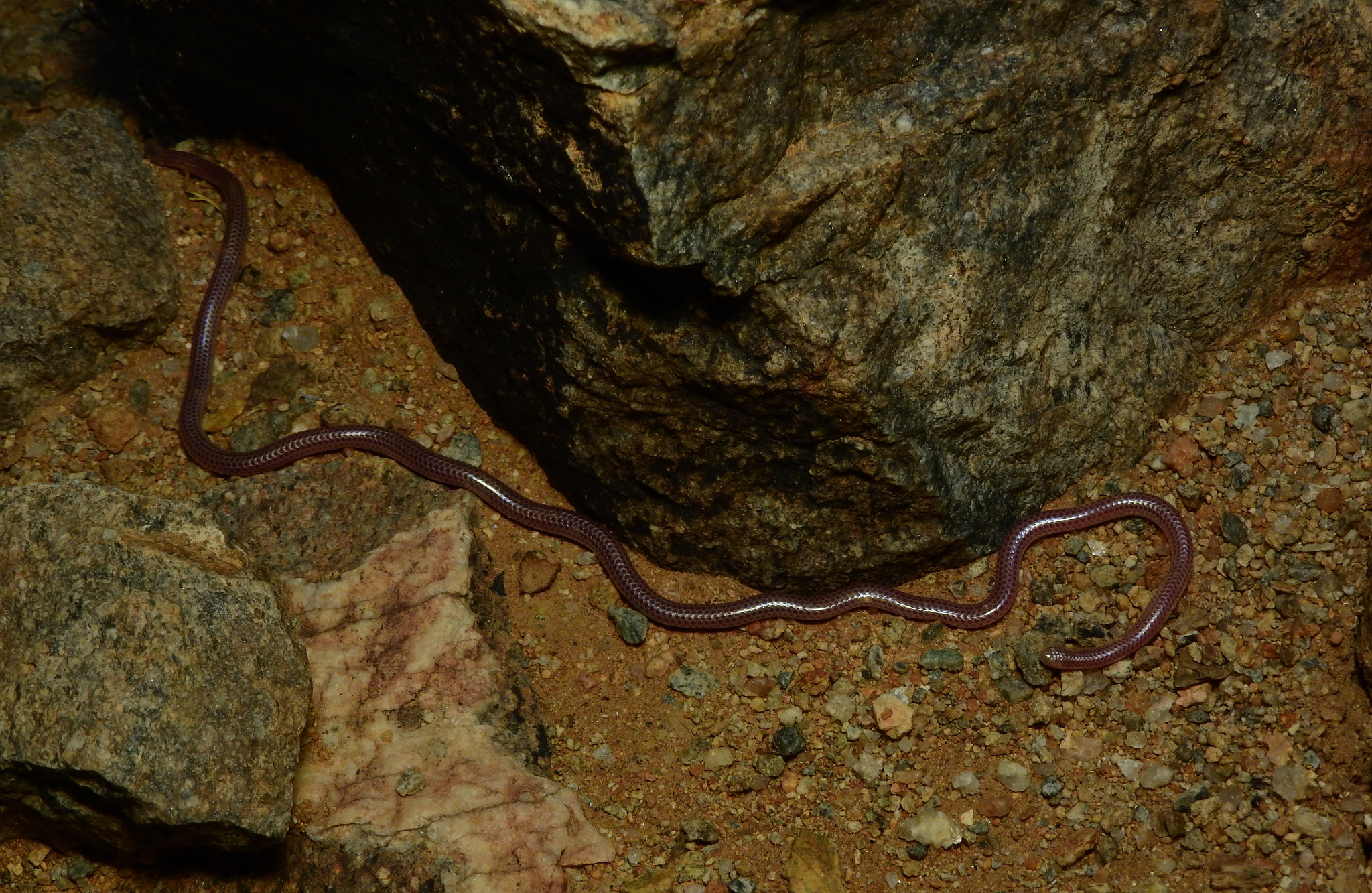
Namibiana type species; Western thread snake (N. occidentalis)

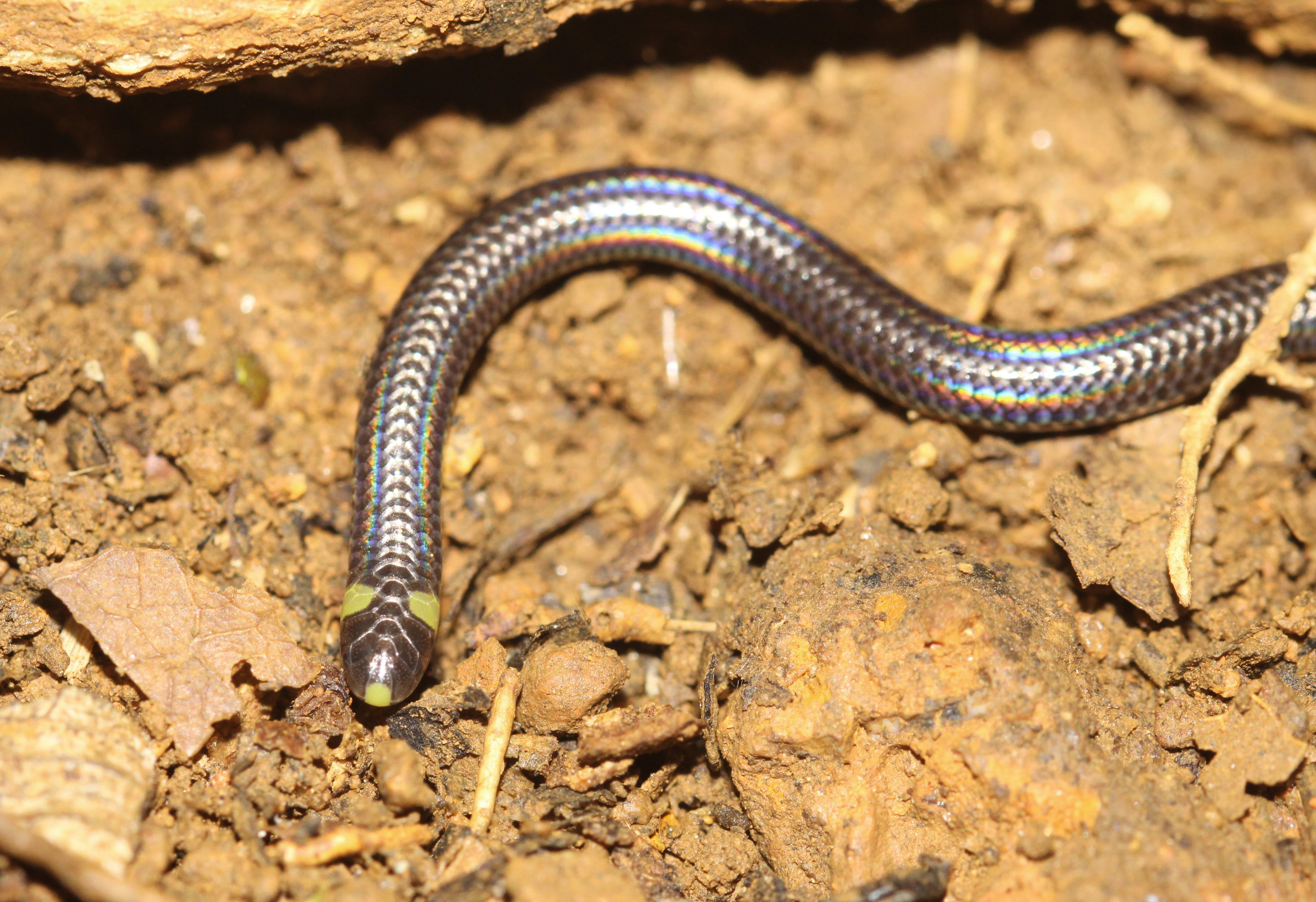
Habrophallos type species; Collared blind snake (H. collaris)

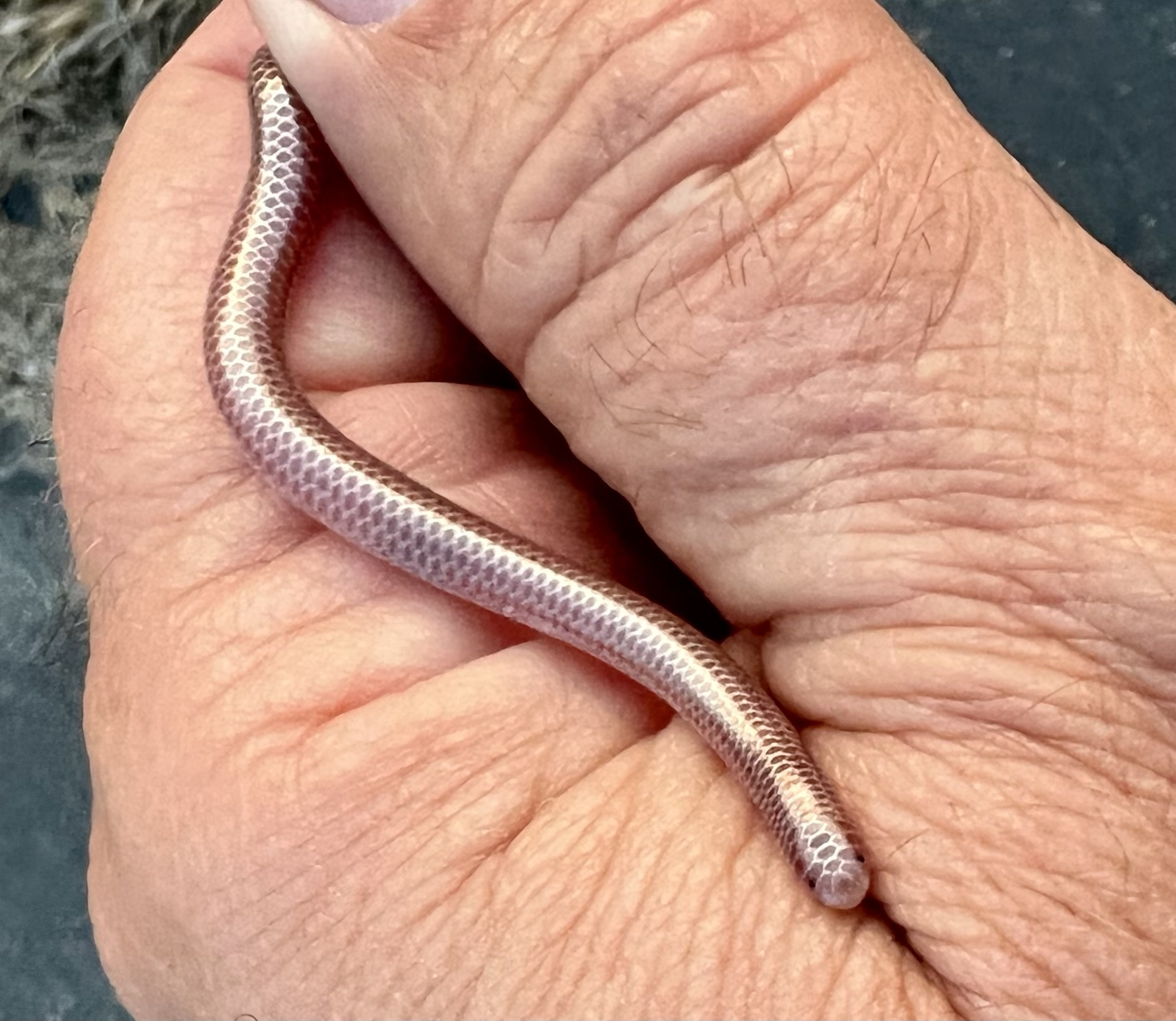
Rena type species; Western blind snake (R. humilis)

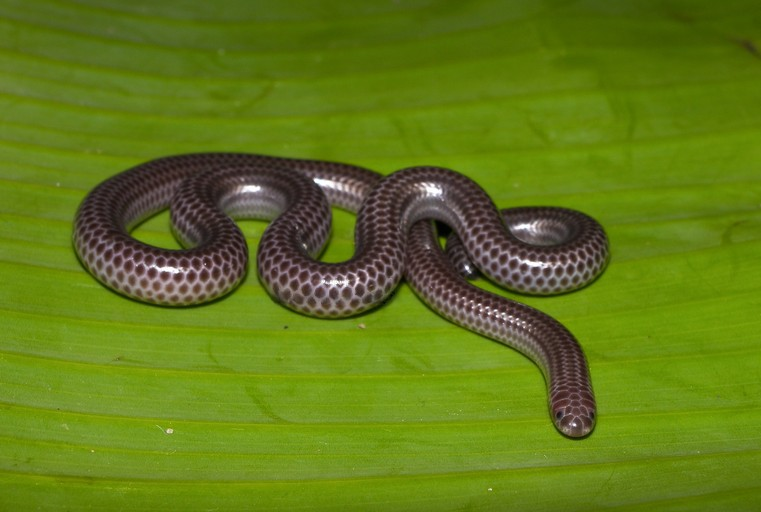
Trilepida type species; Big-scaled blind snake (T. macrolepis)

== See also ==
- List of leptotyphlopid species and subspecies
