= List of snakes by scientific name =

This is a list of the scientific names of extant snakes. It includes 517 genera and 3,738 species:

Acanthophis
Acanthophis antarcticus
Acanthophis cryptamydros
Acanthophis hawkei
Acanthophis laevis
Acanthophis praelongus
Acanthophis pyrrhus
Acanthophis rugosus
Acanthophis wellsi
Achalinus
Achalinus ater
Achalinus formosanus
Achalinus hainanus
Achalinus jinggangensis
Achalinus meiguensis
Achalinus niger
Achalinus rufescens
Achalinus spinalis
Achalinus werneri
Acrantophis
Acrantophis dumerili
Acrantophis madagascariensis
Acrochordus
Acrochordus arafurae
Acrochordus granulatus
Acrochordus javanicus
Acutotyphlops
Acutotyphlops banaorum
Acutotyphlops infralabialis
Acutotyphlops kunuaensis
Acutotyphlops solomonis
Acutotyphlops subocularis
Adelophis
Adelophis copei
Adelophis foxi
Adelphicos
Adelphicos daryi
Adelphicos ibarrorum
Adelphicos latifasciatum
Adelphicos newmanorum
Adelphicos nigrilatum
Adelphicos quadrivirgatum
Adelphicos sargii
Adelphicos veraepacis
Adelphicos visoninum
Aeluroglena
Aeluroglena cucullata
Afronatrix
Afronatrix anoscopus
Afrotyphlops
Afrotyphlops angolensis
Afrotyphlops anomalus
Afrotyphlops bibronii
Afrotyphlops blanfordii
Afrotyphlops brevis
Afrotyphlops calabresii
Afrotyphlops congestus
Afrotyphlops cuneirostris
Afrotyphlops elegans
Afrotyphlops fornasinii
Afrotyphlops gierrai
Afrotyphlops kaimosae
Afrotyphlops liberiensis
Afrotyphlops lineolatus
Afrotyphlops mucruso
Afrotyphlops nanus
Afrotyphlops nigrocandidus
Afrotyphlops obtusus
Afrotyphlops platyrhynchus
Afrotyphlops punctatus
Afrotyphlops rondoensis
Afrotyphlops schlegelii
Afrotyphlops schmidti
Afrotyphlops steinhausi
Afrotyphlops tanganicanus
Afrotyphlops usambaricus
Agkistrodon
Agkistrodon bilineatus
Agkistrodon conanti
Agkistrodon contortrix
Agkistrodon howardgloydi
Agkistrodon laticinctus
Agkistrodon piscivorus
Agkistrodon russeolus
Agkistrodon taylori
Ahaetulla
Ahaetulla anomala
Ahaetulla dispar
Ahaetulla fasciolata
Ahaetulla fronticincta
Ahaetulla mycterizans
Ahaetulla nasuta
Ahaetulla perroteti
Ahaetulla prasina
Ahaetulla pulverulenta
Aipysurus
Aipysurus apraefrontalis
Aipysurus duboisii
Aipysurus eydouxii
Aipysurus foliosquama
Aipysurus fuscus
Aipysurus laevis
Aipysurus mosaicus
Aipysurus pooleorum
Aipysurus tenuis
Alluaudina
Alluaudina bellyi
Alluaudina mocquardi
Alsophis
Alsophis antiguae
Alsophis antillensis
Alsophis danforthi
Alsophis manselli
Alsophis rijgersmaei
Alsophis rufiventris
Alsophis sajdaki
Alsophis sanctonum
Alsophis sibonius
Amastridium
Amastridium sapperi
Amastridium veliferum
Amblyodipsas
Amblyodipsas concolor
Amblyodipsas dimidiata
Amblyodipsas katangensis
Amblyodipsas microphthalma
Amblyodipsas polylepis
Amblyodipsas rodhaini
Amblyodipsas teitana
Amblyodipsas unicolor
Amblyodipsas ventrimaculata
Amerotyphlops
Amerotyphlops amoipira
Amerotyphlops arenensis
Amerotyphlops brongersmianus
Amerotyphlops costaricensis
Amerotyphlops lehneri
Amerotyphlops microstomus
Amerotyphlops minuisquamus
Amerotyphlops paucisquamus
Amerotyphlops reticulatus
Amerotyphlops stadelmani
Amerotyphlops tasymicris
Amerotyphlops tenuis
Amerotyphlops trinitatus
Amerotyphlops tycherus
Amerotyphlops yonenagae
Amnesteophis
Amnesteophis melanauchen
Amphiesma
Amphiesma stolatum
Amphiesmoides
Amphiesmoides ornaticeps
Amplorhinus
Amplorhinus multimaculatus
Anilios
Anilios affinis
Anilios ammodytes
Anilios aspinus
Anilios australis
Anilios batillus
Anilios bicolor
Anilios bituberculatus
Anilios broomi
Anilios centralis
Anilios chamodracaena
Anilios diversus
Anilios endoterus
Anilios erycinus
Anilios fossor
Anilios ganei
Anilios grypus
Anilios guentheri
Anilios hamatus
Anilios howi
Anilios insperatus
Anilios kimberleyensis
Anilios leptosomus
Anilios leucoproctus
Anilios ligatus
Anilios longissimus
Anilios margaretae
Anilios micrommus
Anilios minimus
Anilios nema
Anilios nigrescens
Anilios obtusifrons
Anilios pilbarensis
Anilios pinguis
Anilios proximus
Anilios robertsi
Anilios silvia
Anilios splendidus
Anilios systenos
Anilios torresianus
Anilios tovelli
Anilios troglodytes
Anilios unguirostris
Anilios waitii
Anilios wiedii
Anilios yampiensis
Anilios yirrikalae
Anilios zonula
Anilius
Anilius scytale
Anomalepis
Anomalepis aspinosus
Anomalepis colombia
Anomalepis flavapices
Anomalepis mexicanus
Anomochilus
Anomochilus leonardi
Anomochilus monticola
Anomochilus weberi
Anoplohydrus
Anoplohydrus aemulans
Antaioserpens
Antaioserpens albiceps
Antaioserpens warro
Antaresia
Antaresia childreni
Antaresia maculosa
Antaresia perthensis
Antaresia stimsoni
Antillotyphlops
Antillotyphlops annae
Antillotyphlops catapontus
Antillotyphlops dominicanus
Antillotyphlops geotomus
Antillotyphlops granti
Antillotyphlops guadeloupensis
Antillotyphlops hypomethes
Antillotyphlops monastus
Antillotyphlops monensis
Antillotyphlops naugus
Antillotyphlops platycephalus
Antillotyphlops richardi
Aparallactus
Aparallactus capensis
Aparallactus guentheri
Aparallactus jacksonii
Aparallactus lineatus
Aparallactus lunulatus
Aparallactus modestus
Aparallactus moeruensis
Aparallactus niger
Aparallactus nigriceps
Aparallactus turneri
Aparallactus werneri
Aplopeltura
Aplopeltura boa
Apostolepis
Apostolepis albicollaris
Apostolepis ambiniger
Apostolepis ammodites
Apostolepis arenaria
Apostolepis assimilis
Apostolepis borellii
Apostolepis breviceps
Apostolepis cearensis
Apostolepis cerradoensis
Apostolepis christineae
Apostolepis dimidiata
Apostolepis dorbignyi
Apostolepis flavotorquata
Apostolepis gaboi
Apostolepis goiasensis
Apostolepis intermedia
Apostolepis kikoi
Apostolepis lineata
Apostolepis longicaudata
Apostolepis mariae
Apostolepis multicincta
Apostolepis nelsonjorgei
Apostolepis niceforoi
Apostolepis nigrolineata
Apostolepis nigroterminata
Apostolepis phillipsae
Apostolepis polylepis
Apostolepis pymi
Apostolepis quirogai
Apostolepis serrana
Apostolepis striata
Apostolepis tenuis
Apostolepis tertulianobeui
Apostolepis thalesdelemai
Apostolepis underwoodi
Apostolepis vittata
Aprosdoketophis
Aprosdoketophis andreonei
Archelaphe
Archelaphe bella
Argyrogena
Argyrogena fasciolata
Argyrogena vittacaudata
Argyrophis
Argyrophis bothriorhynchus
Argyrophis diardii
Argyrophis fuscus
Argyrophis giadinhensis
Argyrophis hypsobothrius
Argyrophis klemmeri
Argyrophis koshunensis
Argyrophis muelleri
Argyrophis oatesii
Argyrophis roxaneae
Argyrophis siamensis
Argyrophis trangensis
Arizona
Arizona elegans
Arizona pacata
Arrhyton
Arrhyton ainictum
Arrhyton dolichura
Arrhyton procerum
Arrhyton redimitum
Arrhyton supernum
Arrhyton taeniatum
Arrhyton tanyplectum
Arrhyton vittatum
Aspidelaps
Aspidelaps lubricus
Aspidelaps scutatus
Aspidites
Aspidites melanocephalus
Aspidites ramsayi
Aspidomorphus
Aspidomorphus lineaticollis
Aspidomorphus muelleri
Aspidomorphus schlegelii
Aspidura
Aspidura brachyorrhos
Aspidura ceylonensis
Aspidura copei
Aspidura deraniyagalae
Aspidura drummondhayi
Aspidura guentheri
Aspidura ravanai
Aspidura trachyprocta
Asthenodipsas
Asthenodipsas laevis
Asthenodipsas lasgalenensis
Asthenodipsas malaccanus
Asthenodipsas tropidonotus
Asthenodipsas vertebralis
Atheris
Atheris acuminata
Atheris anisolepis
Atheris barbouri
Atheris broadleyi
Atheris ceratophora
Atheris chlorechis
Atheris desaixi
Atheris hirsuta
Atheris hispida
Atheris katangensis
Atheris mabuensis
Atheris matildae
Atheris nitschei
Atheris rungweensis
Atheris squamigera
Atheris subocularis
Atractaspis
Atractaspis andersonii
Atractaspis aterrima
Atractaspis battersbyi
Atractaspis bibronii
Atractaspis boulengeri
Atractaspis congica
Atractaspis corpulenta
Atractaspis dahomeyensis
Atractaspis duerdeni
Atractaspis engaddensis
Atractaspis engdahli
Atractaspis fallax
Atractaspis irregularis
Atractaspis leucomelas
Atractaspis magrettii
Atractaspis microlepidota
Atractaspis micropholis
Atractaspis phillipsi
Atractaspis reticulata
Atractaspis scorteccii
Atractaspis watsoni
Atractus
Atractus acheronius
Atractus albuquerquei
Atractus alphonsehogei
Atractus altagratiae
Atractus alytogrammus
Atractus andinus
Atractus apophis
Atractus arangoi
Atractus atlas
Atractus atratus
Atractus attenuates
Atractus avernus
Atractus ayeush
Atractus badius
Atractus balzani
Atractus biseriatus
Atractus bocki
Atractus bocourti
Atractus boettgeri
Atractus boimirim
Atractus boulengerii
Atractus caete
Atractus careolepis
Atractus carrioni
Atractus caxiuana
Atractus cerberus
Atractus charitoae
Atractus chthonius
Atractus clarki
Atractus collaris
Atractus crassicaudatus
Atractus darienensis
Atractus depressiocellus
Atractus duboisi
Atractus duidensis
Atractus dunni
Atractus echidna
Atractus ecuadorensis
Atractus edioi
Atractus elaps
Atractus emigdioi
Atractus emmeli
Atractus eriki
Atractus erythromelas
Atractus esepe
Atractus favae
Atractus flammigerus
Atractus franciscopaivai
Atractus francoi
Atractus fuliginosus
Atractus gaigeae
Atractus gigas
Atractus guentheri
Atractus heliobelluomini
Atractus heyeri
Atractus hoogmoedi
Atractus hostilitractus
Atractus imperfectus
Atractus indistinctus
Atractus insipidus
Atractus iridescens
Atractus lancinii
Atractus lasallei
Atractus latifrons
Atractus lehmanni
Atractus loveridgei
Atractus macondo
Atractus maculatus
Atractus major
Atractus manizalesensis
Atractus mariselae
Atractus matthewi
Atractus medusa
Atractus melanogaster
Atractus melas
Atractus meridensis
Atractus micheleae
Atractus microrhynchus
Atractus mijaresi
Atractus modestus
Atractus multicinctus
Atractus multidentatus
Atractus nasutus
Atractus natans
Atractus nicefori
Atractus nigricaudus
Atractus nigriventris
Atractus obesus
Atractus obtusirostris
Atractus occidentalis
Atractus occipitoalbus
Atractus ochrosetrus
Atractus oculotemporalis
Atractus orcesi
Atractus paisa
Atractus pamplonensis
Atractus pantostictus
Atractus paraguayensis
Atractus paravertebralis
Atractus paucidens
Atractus pauciscutatus
Atractus peruvianus
Atractus poeppigi
Atractus potschi
Atractus punctiventris
Atractus pyroni
Atractus resplendens
Atractus reticulatus
Atractus riveroi
Atractus ronnie
Atractus roulei
Atractus sanctaemartae
Atractus sanguineus
Atractus savagei
Atractus schach
Atractus serranus
Atractus snethlageae
Atractus spinalis
Atractus steyermarki
Atractus surucucu
Atractus taeniatus
Atractus tamaensis
Atractus tamessari
Atractus taphorni
Atractus tartarus
Atractus thalesdelemai
Atractus titanicus
Atractus torquatus
Atractus touzeti
Atractus trihedrurus
Atractus trilineatus
Atractus trivittatus
Atractus turikensis
Atractus typhon
Atractus variegatus
Atractus ventrimaculatus
Atractus vertebralis
Atractus vertebrolineatus
Atractus vittatus
Atractus wagleri
Atractus werneri
Atractus zebrinus
Atractus zidoki
Atretium
Atretium schistosum
Atretium yunnanensis
Atropoides
Atropoides indomitus
Atropoides mexicanus
Atropoides nummifer
Atropoides occiduus
Atropoides olmec
Atropoides picadoi
Austrelaps
Austrelaps labialis
Austrelaps ramsayi
Austrelaps superbus
Azemiops
Azemiops feae
Azemiops kharini
Balanophis
Balanophis ceylonensis
Bamanophis
Bamanophis dorri
Bitia
Bitia hydroides
Bitis
Bitis albanica
Bitis arietans
Bitis armata
Bitis atropos
Bitis caudalis
Bitis cornuta
Bitis gabonica
Bitis harenna
Bitis heraldica
Bitis inornata
Bitis nasicornis
Bitis parviocula
Bitis peringueyi
Bitis rhinoceros
Bitis rubida
Bitis schneideri
Bitis worthingtoni
Bitis xeropaga
Blythia
Blythia hmuifang
Blythia reticulata
Boa
Boa constrictor
Boa imperator
Boaedon
Boaedon capensis
Boaedon fuliginosus
Boaedon lineatus
Boaedon littoralis
Boaedon longilineatus
Boaedon maculatus
Boaedon olivaceus
Boaedon paralineatus
Boaedon perisilvestris
Boaedon radfordi
Boaedon subflavus
Boaedon upembae
Boaedon virgatus
Bogertophis
Bogertophis rosaliae
Bogertophis subocularis
Boiga
Boiga andamanensis
Boiga angulata
Boiga barnesii
Boiga beddomei
Boiga bengkuluensis
Boiga bourreti
Boiga ceylonensis
Boiga cyanea
Boiga cynodon
Boiga dendrophila
Boiga dightoni
Boiga drapiezii
Boiga flaviviridis
Boiga forsteni
Boiga gocool
Boiga guangxiensis
Boiga hoeseli
Boiga irregularis
Boiga jaspidea
Boiga kraepelini
Boiga multifasciata
Boiga multomaculata
Boiga nigriceps
Boiga nuchalis
Boiga ochracea
Boiga philippina
Boiga quincunciata
Boiga saengsomi
Boiga schultzei
Boiga siamensis
Boiga tanahjampeana
Boiga trigonata
Boiga wallachi
Boiga westermanni
Boiruna
Boiruna maculata
Boiruna sertaneja
Bolyeria
Bolyeria multocarinata
Borikenophis
Borikenophis portoricensis
Borikenophis sanctaecrucis
Borikenophis variegatus
Bothriechis
Bothriechis aurifer
Bothriechis bicolor
Bothriechis guifarroi
Bothriechis lateralis
Bothriechis marchi
Bothriechis nigroviridis
Bothriechis nubestris
Bothriechis rowleyi
Bothriechis schlegelii
Bothriechis supraciliaris
Bothriechis thalassinus
Bothrochilus
Bothrochilus albertisii
Bothrochilus biakensis
Bothrochilus boa
Bothrochilus fredparkeri
Bothrochilus huonensis
Bothrochilus meridionalis
Bothrochilus montanus
Bothrocophias
Bothrocophias andianus
Bothrocophias campbelli
Bothrocophias colombianus
Bothrocophias hyoprora
Bothrocophias microphthalmus
Bothrocophias myersi
Bothrolycus
Bothrolycus ater
Bothrophthalmus
Bothrophthalmus brunneus
Bothrophthalmus lineatus
Bothrops
Bothrops alcatraz
Bothrops alternatus
Bothrops ammodytoides
Bothrops asper
Bothrops atrox
Bothrops ayerbei
Bothrops barnetti
Bothrops bilineatus
Bothrops brazili
Bothrops caribbaeus
Bothrops chloromelas
Bothrops cotiara
Bothrops diporus
Bothrops erythromelas
Bothrops fonsecai
Bothrops insularis
Bothrops itapetiningae
Bothrops jararaca
Bothrops jararacussu
Bothrops jonathani
Bothrops lanceolatus
Bothrops leucurus
Bothrops lojanus
Bothrops lutzi
Bothrops marajoensis
Bothrops marmoratus
Bothrops matogrossensis
Bothrops medusa
Bothrops moojeni
Bothrops muriciensis
Bothrops neuwiedi
Bothrops oligolepis
Bothrops osbornei
Bothrops otavioi
Bothrops pauloensis
Bothrops pictus
Bothrops pirajai
Bothrops pubescens
Bothrops pulcher
Bothrops punctatus
Bothrops rhombeatus
Bothrops sanctaecrucis
Bothrops sazimai
Bothrops taeniatus
Bothrops venezuelensis
Brachyophis
Brachyophis revoili
Brachyorrhos
Brachyorrhos albus
Brachyorrhos gastrotaenius
Brachyorrhos raffrayi
Brachyorrhos wallacei
Brachyurophis
Brachyurophis approximans
Brachyurophis australis
Brachyurophis campbelli
Brachyurophis fasciolatus
Brachyurophis incinctus
Brachyurophis morrisi
Brachyurophis roperi
Brachyurophis semifasciatus
Brygophis
Brygophis coulangesi
Buhoma
Buhoma depressiceps
Buhoma procterae
Buhoma vauerocegae
Bungarus
Bungarus andamanensis
Bungarus bungaroides
Bungarus caeruleus
Bungarus candidus
Bungarus ceylonicus
Bungarus fasciatus
Bungarus flaviceps
Bungarus lividus
Bungarus magnimaculatus
Bungarus multicinctus
Bungarus niger
Bungarus persicus
Bungarus sindanus
Bungarus slowinskii
Bungarus walli
Caaeteboia
Caaeteboia amarali
Cacophis
Cacophis churchilli
Cacophis harriettae
Cacophis krefftii
Cacophis squamulosus
Calabaria
Calabaria reinhardtii
Calamaria
Calamaria abramovi
Calamaria abstrusa
Calamaria acutirostris
Calamaria albiventer
Calamaria alidae
Calamaria andersoni
Calamaria apraeocularis
Calamaria banggaiensis
Calamaria battersbyi
Calamaria bicolor
Calamaria bitorques
Calamaria boesemani
Calamaria borneensis
Calamaria brongersmai
Calamaria buchi
Calamaria butonensis
Calamaria ceramensis
Calamaria concolor
Calamaria crassa
Calamaria curta
Calamaria doederleini
Calamaria eiselti
Calamaria everetti
Calamaria forcarti
Calamaria gervaisii
Calamaria gialaiensis
Calamaria grabowskyi
Calamaria gracillima
Calamaria griswoldi
Calamaria hilleniusi
Calamaria ingeri
Calamaria javanica
Calamaria joloensis
Calamaria lateralis
Calamaria lautensis
Calamaria leucogaster
Calamaria linnaei
Calamaria longirostris
Calamaria lovii
Calamaria lumbricoidea
Calamaria lumholtzi
Calamaria margaritophora
Calamaria mecheli
Calamaria melanota
Calamaria modesta
Calamaria muelleri
Calamaria nuchalis
Calamaria palawanensis
Calamaria pavimentata
Calamaria pfefferi
Calamaria prakkei
Calamaria rebentischi
Calamaria sangi
Calamaria schlegeli
Calamaria schmidti
Calamaria septentrionalis
Calamaria suluensis
Calamaria sumatrana
Calamaria thanhi
Calamaria ulmeri
Calamaria virgulata
Calamaria yunnanensis
Calamodontophis
Calamodontophis paucidens
Calamodontophis ronaldoi
Calamophis
Calamophis jobiensis
Calamophis katesandersae
Calamophis ruuddelangi
Calamophis sharonbrooksae
Calamorhabdium
Calamorhabdium acuticeps
Calamorhabdium kuekenthali
Calliophis
Calliophis beddomei
Calliophis bibroni
Calliophis bivirgatus
Calliophis castoe
Calliophis gracilis
Calliophis haematoetron
Calliophis intestinalis
Calliophis maculiceps
Calliophis melanurus
Calliophis nigrescens
Calliophis salitan
Calloselasma
Calloselasma rhodostoma
Candoia
Candoia aspera
Candoia bibroni
Candoia carinata
Candoia paulsoni
Candoia superciliosa
Cantoria
Cantoria violacea
Caraiba
Caraiba andreae
Carphophis
Carphophis amoenus
Carphophis vermis
Casarea
Casarea dussumieri
Cathetorhinus
Cathetorhinus melanocephalus
Causus
Causus bilineatus
Causus defilippii
Causus lichtensteinii
Causus maculatus
Causus rasmusseni
Causus resimus
Causus rhombeatus
Cemophora
Cemophora coccinea
Cemophora lineri
Cerastes
Cerastes boehmei
Cerastes cerastes
Cerastes gasperettii
Cerastes vipera
Cerberus
Cerberus australis
Cerberus dunsoni
Cerberus microlepis
Cerberus rynchops
Cerberus schneiderii
Cercophis
Cercophis auratus
Cerrophidion
Cerrophidion godmani
Cerrophidion petlalcalensis
Cerrophidion sasai
Cerrophidion tzotzilorum
Cerrophidion wilsoni
Chamaelycus
Chamaelycus christyi
Chamaelycus fasciatus
Chamaelycus parkeri
Chamaelycus werneri
Chapinophis
Chapinophis xanthocheilus
Charina
Charina bottae
Charina umbratica
Chersodromus
Chersodromus australis
Chersodromus liebmanni
Chersodromus nigrum
Chersodromus rubriventris
Chilabothrus
Chilabothrus angulifer
Chilabothrus argentum
Chilabothrus chrysogaster
Chilabothrus exsul
Chilabothrus fordii
Chilabothrus gracilis
Chilabothrus granti
Chilabothrus inornatus
Chilabothrus monensis
Chilabothrus schwartzi
Chilabothrus striatus
Chilabothrus strigilatus
Chilabothrus subflavus
Chilomeniscus
Chilomeniscus savagei
Chilomeniscus stramineus
Chilorhinophis
Chilorhinophis butleri
Chilorhinophis gerardi
Chionactis
Chionactis annulata
Chionactis occipitalis
Chionactis palarostris
Chironius
Chironius bicarinatus
Chironius brazili
Chironius carinatus
Chironius challenger
Chironius diamantina
Chironius exoletus
Chironius flavolineatus
Chironius flavopictus
Chironius foveatus
Chironius fuscus
Chironius grandisquamis
Chironius laevicollis
Chironius laurenti
Chironius leucometapus
Chironius maculoventris
Chironius monticola
Chironius multiventris
Chironius quadricarinatus
Chironius scurrulus
Chironius septentrionalis
Chironius spixii
Chironius vincenti
Chrysopelea
Chrysopelea ornata
Chrysopelea paradisi
Chrysopelea pelias
Chrysopelea rhodopleuron
Chrysopelea taprobanica
Clelia
Clelia clelia
Clelia equatoriana
Clelia errabunda
Clelia hussami
Clelia langeri
Clelia plumbea
Clelia scytalina
Clonophis
Clonophis kirtlandii
Coelognathus
Coelognathus enganensis
Coelognathus erythrurus
Coelognathus flavolineatus
Coelognathus helena
Coelognathus philippinus
Coelognathus radiatus
Coelognathus subradiatus
Collorhabdium
Collorhabdium williamsoni
Coluber
Coluber constrictor
Colubroelaps
Colubroelaps nguyenvansangi
Compsophis
Compsophis albiventris
Compsophis boulengeri
Compsophis fatsibe
Compsophis infralineatus
Compsophis laphystius
Compsophis vinckei
Compsophis zeny
Coniophanes
Coniophanes alvarezi
Coniophanes andresensis
Coniophanes bipunctatus
Coniophanes dromiciformis
Coniophanes fissidens
Coniophanes imperialis
Coniophanes joanae
Coniophanes lateritius
Coniophanes longinquus
Coniophanes melanocephalus
Coniophanes meridanus
Coniophanes michoacanensis
Coniophanes piceivittis
Coniophanes quinquevittatus
Coniophanes sarae
Coniophanes schmidti
Coniophanes taylori
Conophis
Conophis lineatus
Conophis morai
Conophis vittatus
Conopsis
Conopsis acuta
Conopsis amphisticha
Conopsis biserialis
Conopsis lineata
Conopsis megalodon
Conopsis nasus
Contia
Contia longicaudae
Contia tenuis
Corallus
Corallus annulatus
Corallus batesii
Corallus blombergi
Corallus caninus
Corallus cookii
Corallus cropanii
Corallus grenadensis
Corallus hortulanus
Corallus ruschenbergerii
Coronelaps
Coronelaps lepidus
Coronella
Coronella austriaca
Coronella brachyura
Coronella girondica
Crisantophis
Crisantophis nevermanni
Crotalus
Crotalus adamanteus
Crotalus angelensis
Crotalus aquilus
Crotalus armstrongi
Crotalus atrox
Crotalus basiliscus
Crotalus campbelli
Crotalus catalinensis
Crotalus cerastes
Crotalus cerberus
Crotalus culminatus
Crotalus durissus
Crotalus enyo
Crotalus ericsmithi
Crotalus estebanensis
Crotalus horridus
Crotalus intermedius
Crotalus lannomi
Crotalus lepidus
Crotalus lorenzoensis
Crotalus mitchellii
Crotalus molossus
Crotalus morulus
Crotalus oreganus
Crotalus ornatus
Crotalus polisi
Crotalus polystictus
Crotalus pricei
Crotalus pusillus
Crotalus pyrrhus
Crotalus ravus
Crotalus ruber
Crotalus scutulatus
Crotalus simus
Crotalus stejnegeri
Crotalus stephensi
Crotalus tancitarensis
Crotalus thalassoporus
Crotalus tigris
Crotalus tlaloci
Crotalus totonacus
Crotalus transversus
Crotalus triseriatus
Crotalus tzabcan
Crotalus vegrandis
Crotalus viridis
Crotalus willardi
Crotaphopeltis
Crotaphopeltis barotseensis
Crotaphopeltis braestrupi
Crotaphopeltis degeni
Crotaphopeltis hippocrepis
Crotaphopeltis hotamboeia
Crotaphopeltis tornieri
Cryophis
Cryophis hallbergi
Cryptophis
Cryptophis boschmai
Cryptophis incredibilis
Cryptophis nigrescens
Cryptophis nigrostriatus
Cryptophis pallidiceps
Cubatyphlops
Cubatyphlops anchaurus
Cubatyphlops anousius
Cubatyphlops arator
Cubatyphlops biminiensis
Cubatyphlops caymanensis
Cubatyphlops contorhinus
Cubatyphlops epactius
Cubatyphlops golyathi
Cubatyphlops notorachius
Cubatyphlops paradoxus
Cubatyphlops perimychus
Cubatyphlops satelles
Cubophis
Cubophis brooksi
Cubophis cantherigerus
Cubophis caymanus
Cubophis fuscicauda
Cubophis ruttyi
Cubophis vudii
Cyclocorus
Cyclocorus lineatus
Cyclocorus nuchalis
Cyclotyphlops
Cyclotyphlops deharvengi
Cylindrophis
Cylindrophis aruensis
Cylindrophis boulengeri
Cylindrophis burmanus
Cylindrophis engkariensis
Cylindrophis isolepis
Cylindrophis jodiae
Cylindrophis lineatus
Cylindrophis maculatus
Cylindrophis melanotus
Cylindrophis opisthorhodus
Cylindrophis osheai
Cylindrophis ruffus
Cylindrophis subocularis
Cylindrophis yamdena
Daboia
Daboia mauritanica
Daboia palaestinae
Daboia russelii
Daboia siamensis
Dasypeltis
Dasypeltis abyssina
Dasypeltis arabica
Dasypeltis atra
Dasypeltis bazi
Dasypeltis confusa
Dasypeltis crucifera
Dasypeltis fasciata
Dasypeltis gansi
Dasypeltis inornata
Dasypeltis latericia
Dasypeltis medici
Dasypeltis palmarum
Dasypeltis parascabra
Dasypeltis sahelensis
Dasypeltis scabra
Dasypeltis taylori
Deinagkistrodon
Deinagkistrodon acutus
Demansia
Demansia angusticeps
Demansia calodera
Demansia flagellatio
Demansia olivacea
Demansia papuensis
Demansia psammophis
Demansia quaesitor
Demansia reticulata
Demansia rimicola
Demansia rufescens
Demansia shinei
Demansia simplex
Demansia torquata
Demansia vestigiata
Dendrelaphis
Dendrelaphis andamanensis
Dendrelaphis ashoki
Dendrelaphis bifrenalis
Dendrelaphis biloreatus
Dendrelaphis calligaster
Dendrelaphis caudolineatus
Dendrelaphis caudolineolatus
Dendrelaphis chairecacos
Dendrelaphis cyanochloris
Dendrelaphis flavescens
Dendrelaphis formosus
Dendrelaphis fuliginosus
Dendrelaphis gastrostictus
Dendrelaphis girii
Dendrelaphis grandoculis
Dendrelaphis grismeri
Dendrelaphis haasi
Dendrelaphis hollinrakei
Dendrelaphis humayuni
Dendrelaphis inornatus
Dendrelaphis keiensis
Dendrelaphis kopsteini
Dendrelaphis levitoni
Dendrelaphis lineolatus
Dendrelaphis lorentzii
Dendrelaphis luzonensis
Dendrelaphis macrops
Dendrelaphis marenae
Dendrelaphis modestus
Dendrelaphis ngansonensis
Dendrelaphis nigroserratus
Dendrelaphis oliveri
Dendrelaphis papuensis
Dendrelaphis philippinensis
Dendrelaphis pictus
Dendrelaphis punctulatus
Dendrelaphis schokari
Dendrelaphis sinharajensis
Dendrelaphis striatus
Dendrelaphis striolatus
Dendrelaphis subocularis
Dendrelaphis terrificus
Dendrelaphis tristis
Dendrelaphis underwoodi
Dendrelaphis walli
Dendroaspis
Dendroaspis angusticeps
Dendroaspis jamesoni
Dendroaspis polylepis
Dendroaspis viridis
Dendrolycus
Dendrolycus elapoides
Dendrophidion
Dendrophidion apharocybe
Dendrophidion atlantica
Dendrophidion bivittatus
Dendrophidion boshelli
Dendrophidion brunneum
Dendrophidion clarkii
Dendrophidion crybelum
Dendrophidion dendrophis
Dendrophidion graciliverpa
Dendrophidion nuchale
Dendrophidion paucicarinatum
Dendrophidion percarinatum
Dendrophidion prolixum
Dendrophidion rufiterminorum
Dendrophidion vinitor
Denisonia
Denisonia devisi
Denisonia maculata
Diadophis
Diadophis punctatus
Diaphorolepis
Diaphorolepis laevis
Diaphorolepis wagneri
Dieurostus
Dieurostus dussumieri
Dipsadoboa
Dipsadoboa aulica
Dipsadoboa brevirostris
Dipsadoboa duchesnii
Dipsadoboa flavida
Dipsadoboa shrevei
Dipsadoboa underwoodi
Dipsadoboa unicolor
Dipsadoboa viridis
Dipsadoboa weileri
Dipsadoboa werneri
Dipsas
Dipsas albifrons
Dipsas alternans
Dipsas andiana
Dipsas articulata
Dipsas baliomelas
Dipsas bicolor
Dipsas bobridgelyi
Dipsas brevifacies
Dipsas bucephala
Dipsas catesbyi
Dipsas chaparensis
Dipsas cisticeps
Dipsas copei
Dipsas elegans
Dipsas ellipsifera
Dipsas gaigeae
Dipsas georgejetti
Dipsas gracilis
Dipsas incerta
Dipsas indica
Dipsas jamespetersi
Dipsas klebbai
Dipsas latifrontalis
Dipsas lavillai
Dipsas maxillaris
Dipsas mikanii
Dipsas neuwiedi
Dipsas nicholsi
Dipsas oligozonata
Dipsas oneilli
Dipsas oreas
Dipsas oswaldobaezi
Dipsas pakaraima
Dipsas palmeri
Dipsas pavonina
Dipsas peruana
Dipsas praeornata
Dipsas pratti
Dipsas sanctijoannis
Dipsas sazimai
Dipsas schunkii
Dipsas temporalis
Dipsas tenuissima
Dipsas trinitatis
Dipsas turgidus
Dipsas vagrans
Dipsas vagus
Dipsas variegata
Dipsas ventrimaculatus
Dipsas vermiculata
Dipsas viguieri
Dipsas williamsi
Dipsina
Dipsina multimaculata
Dispholidus
Dispholidus typus
Ditaxodon
Ditaxodon taeniatus
Ditypophis
Ditypophis vivax
Djokoiskandarus
Djokoiskandarus annulata
Dolichophis
Dolichophis caspius
Dolichophis cypriensis
Dolichophis jugularis
Dolichophis schmidti
Drepanoides
Drepanoides anomalus
Dromicodryas
Dromicodryas bernieri
Dromicodryas quadrilineatus
Drymarchon
Drymarchon caudomaculatus
Drymarchon corais
Drymarchon couperi
Drymarchon kolpobasileus
Drymarchon margaritae
Drymarchon melanurus
Drymobius
Drymobius chloroticus
Drymobius margaritiferus
Drymobius melanotropis
Drymobius rhombifer
Drymoluber
Drymoluber apurimacensis
Drymoluber brazili
Drymoluber dichrous
Dryophiops
Dryophiops philippina
Dryophiops rubescens
Drysdalia
Drysdalia coronoides
Drysdalia mastersii
Drysdalia rhodogaster
Duberria
Duberria lutrix
Duberria rhodesiana
Duberria shirana
Duberria variegata
Echinanthera
Echinanthera amoena
Echinanthera cephalomaculata
Echinanthera cephalostriata
Echinanthera cyanopleura
Echinanthera melanostigma
Echinanthera undulata
Echiopsis
Echiopsis curta
Echis
Echis borkini
Echis carinatus
Echis coloratus
Echis hughesi
Echis jogeri
Echis khosatzkii
Echis leucogaster
Echis megalocephalus
Echis ocellatus
Echis omanensis
Echis pyramidum
Echis romani
Eirenis
Eirenis africanus
Eirenis aurolineatus
Eirenis barani
Eirenis collaris
Eirenis coronella
Eirenis coronelloides
Eirenis decemlineatus
Eirenis eiselti
Eirenis hakkariensis
Eirenis kermanensis
Eirenis levantinus
Eirenis lineomaculatus
Eirenis medus
Eirenis modestus
Eirenis occidentalis
Eirenis persicus
Eirenis punctatolineatus
Eirenis rechingeri
Eirenis rothii
Eirenis thospitis
Elaphe
Elaphe anomala
Elaphe bimaculata
Elaphe cantoris
Elaphe carinata
Elaphe climacophora
Elaphe davidi
Elaphe dione
Elaphe hodgsoni
Elaphe moellendorffi
Elaphe quadrivirgata
Elaphe quatuorlineata
Elaphe sauromates
Elaphe schrenckii
Elaphe taeniura
Elaphe zoigeensis
Elapognathus
Elapognathus coronatus
Elapognathus minor
Elapoidis
Elapoidis fusca
Elapoidis sumatrana
Elapomorphus
Elapomorphus quinquelineatus
Elapomorphus wuchereri
Elapotinus
Elapotinus picteti
Elapsoidea
Elapsoidea boulengeri
Elapsoidea broadleyi
Elapsoidea chelazziorum
Elapsoidea guentherii
Elapsoidea laticincta
Elapsoidea loveridgei
Elapsoidea nigra
Elapsoidea semiannulata
Elapsoidea sundevallii
Elapsoidea trapei
Emmochliophis
Emmochliophis fugleri
Emmochliophis miops
Emydocephalus
Emydocephalus annulatus
Emydocephalus ijimae
Emydocephalus szczerbaki
Enhydris
Enhydris chanardi
Enhydris enhydris
Enhydris innominata
Enhydris jagorii
Enhydris longicauda
Enhydris subtaeniata
Enuliophis
Enuliophis sclateri
Enulius
Enulius bifoveatus
Enulius flavitorques
Enulius oligostichus
Enulius roatanensis
Epacrophis
Epacrophis boulengeri
Epacrophis drewesi
Epacrophis reticulatus
Ephalophis
Ephalophis greyae
Epicrates
Epicrates alvarezi
Epicrates assisi
Epicrates cenchria
Epicrates crassus
Epicrates maurus
Epictia
Epictia albifrons
Epictia albipuncta
Epictia alfredschmidti
Epictia amazonica
Epictia antoniogarciai
Epictia ater
Epictia australis
Epictia bakewelli
Epictia borapeliotes
Epictia clinorostris
Epictia collaris
Epictia columbi
Epictia diaplocia
Epictia fallax
Epictia goudotii
Epictia hobartsmithi
Epictia magnamaculata
Epictia martinezi
Epictia melanura
Epictia munoai
Epictia pauldwyeri
Epictia peruviana
Epictia phenops
Epictia resetari
Epictia rubrolineata
Epictia rufidorsa
Epictia schneideri
Epictia septemlineata
Epictia signata
Epictia striatula
Epictia subcrotilla
Epictia teaguei
Epictia tenella
Epictia tesselata
Epictia tricolor
Epictia undecimstriata
Epictia unicolor
Epictia vanwallachi
Epictia vellardi
Epictia venegasi
Epictia vindumi
Epictia vonmayi
Epictia wynni
Eristicophis
Eristicophis macmahoni
Erpeton
Erpeton tentaculatum
Erythrolamprus
Erythrolamprus aesculapii
Erythrolamprus albertguentheri
Erythrolamprus almadensis
Erythrolamprus andinus
Erythrolamprus atraventer
Erythrolamprus bizona
Erythrolamprus breviceps
Erythrolamprus carajasensis
Erythrolamprus ceii
Erythrolamprus cobella
Erythrolamprus cursor
Erythrolamprus dorsocorallinus
Erythrolamprus epinephelus
Erythrolamprus festae
Erythrolamprus frenatus
Erythrolamprus guentheri
Erythrolamprus ingeri
Erythrolamprus jaegeri
Erythrolamprus janaleeae
Erythrolamprus juliae
Erythrolamprus longiventris
Erythrolamprus maryellenae
Erythrolamprus melanotus
Erythrolamprus mertensi
Erythrolamprus miliaris
Erythrolamprus mimus
Erythrolamprus mossoroensis
Erythrolamprus ocellatus
Erythrolamprus oligolepis
Erythrolamprus ornatus
Erythrolamprus perfuscus
Erythrolamprus poecilogyrus
Erythrolamprus problematicus
Erythrolamprus pseudocorallus
Erythrolamprus pyburni
Erythrolamprus pygmaeus
Erythrolamprus reginae
Erythrolamprus sagittifer
Erythrolamprus semiaureus
Erythrolamprus subocularis
Erythrolamprus taeniogaster
Erythrolamprus taeniurus
Erythrolamprus torrenicola
Erythrolamprus trebbaui
Erythrolamprus triscalis
Erythrolamprus typhlus
Erythrolamprus viridis
Erythrolamprus vitti
Erythrolamprus williamsi
Erythrolamprus zweifeli
Eryx
Eryx borrii
Eryx colubrinus
Eryx conicus
Eryx elegans
Eryx jaculus
Eryx jayakari
Eryx johnii
Eryx miliaris
Eryx muelleri
Eryx somalicus
Eryx tataricus
Eryx whitakeri
Etheridgeum
Etheridgeum pulchrum
Eunectes
Eunectes beniensis
Eunectes deschauenseei
Eunectes murinus
Eunectes notaeus
Euprepiophis
Euprepiophis conspicillata
Euprepiophis mandarinus
Euprepiophis perlacea
Eutrachelophis
Eutrachelophis bassleri
Eutrachelophis steinbachi
Exiliboa
Exiliboa placata
Farancia
Farancia abacura
Farancia erytrogramma
Ferania
Ferania sieboldii
Ficimia
Ficimia hardyi
Ficimia olivacea
Ficimia publia
Ficimia ramirezi
Ficimia ruspator
Ficimia streckeri
Ficimia variegata
Fimbrios
Fimbrios klossi
Fimbrios smithi
Fordonia
Fordonia leucobalia
Furina (snake)
Furina barnardi
Furina diadema
Furina dunmalli
Furina ornata
Furina tristis
Garthius
Garthius chaseni
Geagras
Geagras redimitus
Geophis
Geophis anocularis
Geophis bellus
Geophis betaniensis
Geophis bicolor
Geophis blanchardi
Geophis brachycephalus
Geophis cancellatus
Geophis carinosus
Geophis chalybeus
Geophis championi
Geophis damiani
Geophis downsi
Geophis dubius
Geophis duellmani
Geophis dugesii
Geophis dunni
Geophis fulvoguttatus
Geophis godmani
Geophis hoffmanni
Geophis immaculatus
Geophis incomptus
Geophis isthmicus
Geophis juarezi
Geophis juliai
Geophis laticinctus
Geophis laticollaris
Geophis latifrontalis
Geophis lorancai
Geophis maculiferus
Geophis mutitorques
Geophis nasalis
Geophis nephodrymus
Geophis nigroalbus
Geophis nigrocinctus
Geophis occabus
Geophis omiltemanus
Geophis petersii
Geophis pyburni
Geophis rhodogaster
Geophis rostralis
Geophis russatus
Geophis ruthveni
Geophis sallaei
Geophis semidoliatus
Geophis sieboldi
Geophis talamancae
Geophis tarascae
Geophis tectus
Geophis turbidus
Geophis zeledoni
Gerarda
Gerarda prevostiana
Gerrhopilus
Gerrhopilus addisoni
Gerrhopilus andamanensis
Gerrhopilus ater
Gerrhopilus beddomii
Gerrhopilus bisubocularis
Gerrhopilus ceylonicus
Gerrhopilus depressiceps
Gerrhopilus eurydice
Gerrhopilus floweri
Gerrhopilus fredparkeri
Gerrhopilus hades
Gerrhopilus hedraeus
Gerrhopilus inornatus
Gerrhopilus lestes
Gerrhopilus mcdowelli
Gerrhopilus mirus
Gerrhopilus oligolepis
Gerrhopilus persephone
Gerrhopilus thurstoni
Gerrhopilus tindalli
Gloydius
Gloydius angusticeps
Gloydius blomhoffii
Gloydius brevicaudus
Gloydius halys
Gloydius himalayanus
Gloydius intermedius
Gloydius lijianlii
Gloydius liupanensis
Gloydius monticola
Gloydius qinlingensis
Gloydius rickmersi
Gloydius rubromaculatus
Gloydius shedaoensis
Gloydius strauchi
Gloydius tsushimaensis
Gloydius ussuriensis
Gomesophis
Gomesophis brasiliensis
Gongylosoma
Gongylosoma baliodeirum
Gongylosoma longicaudum
Gongylosoma mukutense
Gongylosoma nicobariensis
Gongylosoma scriptum
Gonionotophis
Gonionotophis brussauxi
Gonionotophis egbensis
Gonionotophis gabouensis
Gonionotophis grantii
Gonionotophis klingi
Gonionotophis laurenti
Gonionotophis poensis
Gonionotophis stenophthalmus
Gonyosoma
Gonyosoma boulengeri
Gonyosoma frenatum
Gonyosoma jansenii
Gonyosoma margaritatum
Gonyosoma oxycephalum
Gonyosoma prasinum
Gracililima
Gracililima nyassae
Grayia
Grayia caesar
Grayia ornata
Grayia smithii
Grayia tholloni
Grypotyphlops
Grypotyphlops acutus
Gyalopion
Gyalopion canum
Gyalopion quadrangulare
Gyiophis
Gyiophis maculosa
Gyiophis salweenensis
Gyiophis vorisi
Haitiophis
Haitiophis anomalus
Haldea
Haldea striatula
Hapsidophrys
Hapsidophrys lineatus
Hapsidophrys principis
Hapsidophrys smaragdinus
Hebius
Hebius andreae
Hebius annamensis
Hebius arquus
Hebius atemporale
Hebius beddomei
Hebius bitaeniatum
Hebius boulengeri
Hebius celebicum
Hebius chapaensis
Hebius clerki
Hebius concelarum
Hebius craspedogaster
Hebius deschauenseei
Hebius flavifrons
Hebius frenatum
Hebius groundwateri
Hebius inas
Hebius ishigakiense
Hebius johannis
Hebius kerinciense
Hebius khasiense
Hebius leucomystax
Hebius metusium
Hebius miyajimae
Hebius modestum
Hebius monticola
Hebius nicobariense
Hebius octolineatum
Hebius optatum
Hebius parallelum
Hebius pealii
Hebius petersii
Hebius popei
Hebius pryeri
Hebius sanguineum
Hebius sarasinorum
Hebius sarawacense
Hebius sauteri
Hebius taronense
Hebius venningi
Hebius vibakari
Hebius viperinum
Hebius xenura
Hebius yanbianensis
Helicops
Helicops angulatus
Helicops apiaka
Helicops carinicaudus
Helicops danieli
Helicops gomesi
Helicops hagmanni
Helicops infrataeniatus
Helicops leopardinus
Helicops modestus
Helicops nentur
Helicops pastazae
Helicops petersi
Helicops polylepis
Helicops scalaris
Helicops tapajonicus
Helicops trivittatus
Helicops yacu
Helminthophis
Helminthophis flavoterminatus
Helminthophis frontalis
Helminthophis praeocularis
Helophis
Helophis schoutedeni
Hemachatus
Hemachatus haemachatus
Hemerophis
Hemerophis socotrae
Hemiaspis
Hemiaspis damelii
Hemiaspis signata
Hemibungarus
Hemibungarus calligaster
Hemirhagerrhis
Hemirhagerrhis hildebrandtii
Hemirhagerrhis kelleri
Hemirhagerrhis nototaenia
Hemirhagerrhis viperina
Hemorrhois
Hemorrhois algirus
Hemorrhois hippocrepis
Hemorrhois nummifer
Hemorrhois ravergieri
Herpetoreas
Herpetoreas burbrinki
Herpetoreas platyceps
Herpetoreas sieboldii
Heterodon
Heterodon kennerlyi
Heterodon nasicus
Heterodon platirhinos
Heterodon simus
Heteroliodon
Heteroliodon fohy
Heteroliodon lava
Heteroliodon occipitalis
Heurnia
Heurnia ventromaculata
Hierophis
Hierophis andreanus
Hierophis gemonensis
Hierophis viridiflavus
Hologerrhum
Hologerrhum dermali
Hologerrhum philippinum
Homalophis
Homalophis doriae
Homalophis gyii
Homalopsis
Homalopsis buccata
Homalopsis hardwickii
Homalopsis mereljcoxi
Homalopsis nigroventralis
Homalopsis semizonata
Homoroselaps
Homoroselaps dorsalis
Homoroselaps lacteus
Hoplocephalus
Hoplocephalus bitorquatus
Hoplocephalus bungaroides
Hoplocephalus stephensii
Hormonotus
Hormonotus modestus
Hydrablabes
Hydrablabes periops
Hydrablabes praefrontalis
Hydraethiops
Hydraethiops laevis
Hydraethiops melanogaster
Hydrelaps
Hydrelaps darwiniensis
Hydrodynastes
Hydrodynastes bicinctus
Hydrodynastes gigas
Hydrodynastes melanogigas
Hydromorphus
Hydromorphus concolor
Hydromorphus dunni
Hydrophis
Hydrophis annandalei
Hydrophis atriceps
Hydrophis belcheri
Hydrophis bituberculatus
Hydrophis brookii
Hydrophis caerulescens
Hydrophis cantoris
Hydrophis coggeri
Hydrophis curtus
Hydrophis cyanocinctus
Hydrophis czeblukovi
Hydrophis donaldi
Hydrophis elegans
Hydrophis fasciatus
Hydrophis gracilis
Hydrophis hardwickii
Hydrophis hendersoni
Hydrophis inornatus
Hydrophis jerdonii
Hydrophis kingii
Hydrophis klossi
Hydrophis laboutei
Hydrophis lamberti
Hydrophis lapemoides
Hydrophis macdowelli
Hydrophis major
Hydrophis mamillaris
Hydrophis melanocephalus
Hydrophis melanosoma
Hydrophis nigrocinctus
Hydrophis obscurus
Hydrophis ocellatus
Hydrophis ornatus
Hydrophis pachycercos
Hydrophis pacificus
Hydrophis parviceps
Hydrophis peronii
Hydrophis platurus
Hydrophis schistosus
Hydrophis semperi
Hydrophis sibauensis
Hydrophis spiralis
Hydrophis stokesii
Hydrophis stricticollis
Hydrophis torquatus
Hydrophis viperinus
Hydrophis vorisi
Hydrophis zweifeli
Hydrops
Hydrops caesurus
Hydrops martii
Hydrops triangularis
Hypnale
Hypnale hypnale
Hypnale nepa
Hypnale zara
Hypoptophis
Hypoptophis wilsonii
Hypsiglena
Hypsiglena affinis
Hypsiglena catalinae
Hypsiglena chlorophaea
Hypsiglena jani
Hypsiglena ochrorhynchus
Hypsiglena slevini
Hypsiglena tanzeri
Hypsiglena torquata
Hypsiglena unaocularus
Hypsirhynchus
Hypsirhynchus ater
Hypsirhynchus callilaemus
Hypsirhynchus ferox
Hypsirhynchus funereus
Hypsirhynchus melanichnus
Hypsirhynchus parvifrons
Hypsirhynchus polylepis
Hypsirhynchus scalaris
Hypsiscopus
Hypsiscopus matannensis
Hypsiscopus plumbea
Ialtris
Ialtris agyrtes
Ialtris dorsalis
Ialtris haetianus
Ialtris parishi
Iguanognathus
Iguanognathus werneri
Imantodes
Imantodes cenchoa
Imantodes chocoensis
Imantodes gemmistratus
Imantodes guane
Imantodes inornatus
Imantodes lentiferus
Imantodes phantasma
Imantodes tenuissimus
Indotyphlops
Indotyphlops ahsanai
Indotyphlops albiceps
Indotyphlops braminus
Indotyphlops exiguus
Indotyphlops filiformis
Indotyphlops fletcheri
Indotyphlops jerdoni
Indotyphlops lankaensis
Indotyphlops lazelli
Indotyphlops leucomelas
Indotyphlops longissimus
Indotyphlops loveridgei
Indotyphlops madgemintonae
Indotyphlops malcolmi
Indotyphlops meszoelyi
Indotyphlops ozakiae
Indotyphlops pammeces
Indotyphlops porrectus
Indotyphlops schmutzi
Indotyphlops tenebrarum
Indotyphlops tenuicollis
Indotyphlops veddae
Indotyphlops violaceus
Inyoka
Inyoka swazicus
Isanophis
Isanophis boonsongi
Ithycyphus
Ithycyphus blanci
Ithycyphus goudoti
Ithycyphus miniatus
Ithycyphus oursi
Ithycyphus perineti
Karnsophis
Karnsophis siantaris
Kualatahan
Kualatahan pahangensis
Lachesis
Lachesis acrochorda
Lachesis melanocephala
Lachesis muta
Lachesis stenophrys
Lampropeltis
Lampropeltis abnorma
Lampropeltis alterna
Lampropeltis annulata
Lampropeltis californiae
Lampropeltis calligaster
Lampropeltis catalinensis
Lampropeltis elapsoides
Lampropeltis extenuata
Lampropeltis gentilis
Lampropeltis getula
Lampropeltis greeri
Lampropeltis holbrooki
Lampropeltis knoblochi
Lampropeltis leonis
Lampropeltis mexicana
Lampropeltis micropholis
Lampropeltis nigra
Lampropeltis polyzona
Lampropeltis pyromelana
Lampropeltis ruthveni
Lampropeltis splendida
Lampropeltis triangulum
Lampropeltis webbi
Lampropeltis zonata
Lamprophis
Lamprophis abyssinicus
Lamprophis aurora
Lamprophis erlangeri
Lamprophis fiskii
Lamprophis fuscus
Lamprophis geometricus
Lamprophis guttatus
Langaha
Langaha alluaudi
Langaha madagascariensis
Langaha pseudoalluaudi
Laticauda
Laticauda colubrina
Laticauda crockeri
Laticauda frontalis
Laticauda guineai
Laticauda laticaudata
Laticauda saintgironsi
Laticauda schistorhyncha
Laticauda semifasciata
Leioheterodon
Leioheterodon geayi
Leioheterodon madagascariensis
Leioheterodon modestus
Leptodeira
Leptodeira annulata
Leptodeira bakeri
Leptodeira frenata
Leptodeira maculata
Leptodeira nigrofasciata
Leptodeira polysticta
Leptodeira punctata
Leptodeira rhombifera
Leptodeira rubricata
Leptodeira septentrionalis
Leptodeira splendida
Leptodeira uribei
Leptodrymus
Leptodrymus pulcherrimus
Leptophis
Leptophis ahaetulla
Leptophis coeruleodorsus
Leptophis cupreus
Leptophis depressirostris
Leptophis diplotropis
Leptophis haileyi
Leptophis mexicanus
Leptophis modestus
Leptophis nebulosus
Leptophis riveti
Leptophis stimsoni
Leptotyphlops
Leptotyphlops aethiopicus
Leptotyphlops conjunctus
Leptotyphlops distanti
Leptotyphlops emini
Leptotyphlops howelli
Leptotyphlops incognitus
Leptotyphlops jacobseni
Leptotyphlops kafubi
Leptotyphlops keniensis
Leptotyphlops latirostris
Leptotyphlops macrops
Leptotyphlops mbanjensis
Leptotyphlops merkeri
Leptotyphlops nigricans
Leptotyphlops nigroterminus
Leptotyphlops pembae
Leptotyphlops pitmani
Leptotyphlops pungwensis
Leptotyphlops scutifrons
Leptotyphlops sylvicolus
Leptotyphlops telloi
Letheobia
Letheobia acutirostrata
Letheobia akagerae
Letheobia angeli
Letheobia caeca
Letheobia coecatus
Letheobia crossii
Letheobia debilis
Letheobia decorosus
Letheobia episcopus
Letheobia erythraea
Letheobia feae
Letheobia gracilis
Letheobia graueri
Letheobia jubana
Letheobia kibarae
Letheobia largeni
Letheobia leucosticta
Letheobia lumbriciformis
Letheobia manni
Letheobia mbeerensis
Letheobia newtoni
Letheobia pallida
Letheobia pauwelsi
Letheobia pembana
Letheobia praeocularis
Letheobia rufescens
Letheobia simoni
Letheobia somalica
Letheobia stejnegeri
Letheobia sudanensis
Letheobia swahilica
Letheobia toritensis
Letheobia uluguruensis
Letheobia weidholzi
Letheobia wittei
Letheobia zenkeri
Liasis
Liasis fuscus
Liasis mackloti
Liasis olivaceus
Liasis papuanus
Lichanura
Lichanura orcutti
Lichanura trivirgata
Limaformosa
Limaformosa capensis
Limaformosa chanleri
Limaformosa crossi
Limaformosa guirali
Limaformosa savorgnani
Limaformosa vernayi
Limnophis
Limnophis bangweolicus
Limnophis bicolor
Liodytes
Liodytes alleni
Liodytes pygaea
Liodytes rigida
Lioheterophis
Lioheterophis iheringi
Liopeltis
Liopeltis calamaria
Liopeltis frenatus
Liopeltis philippinus
Liopeltis rappi
Liopeltis stoliczkae
Liopeltis tricolor
Liophidium
Liophidium apperti
Liophidium chabaudi
Liophidium maintikibo
Liophidium mayottensis
Liophidium pattoni
Liophidium rhodogaster
Liophidium therezieni
Liophidium torquatum
Liophidium trilineatum
Liophidium vaillanti
Liopholidophis
Liopholidophis baderi
Liopholidophis dimorphus
Liopholidophis dolicocercus
Liopholidophis grandidieri
Liopholidophis oligolepis
Liopholidophis rhadinaea
Liopholidophis sexlineatus
Liopholidophis varius
Liotyphlops
Liotyphlops albirostris
Liotyphlops anops
Liotyphlops argaleus
Liotyphlops beui
Liotyphlops caissara
Liotyphlops haadi
Liotyphlops schubarti
Liotyphlops sousai
Liotyphlops taylori
Liotyphlops ternetzii
Liotyphlops trefauti
Liotyphlops wilderi
Loveridgelaps
Loveridgelaps elapoides
Loxocemus
Loxocemus bicolor
Lycodon
Lycodon albofuscus
Lycodon alcalai
Lycodon aulicus
Lycodon banksi
Lycodon bibonius
Lycodon butleri
Lycodon capucinus
Lycodon cardamomensis
Lycodon carinatus
Lycodon cavernicolus
Lycodon chrysoprateros
Lycodon davidi
Lycodon davisonii
Lycodon dumerilii
Lycodon effraenis
Lycodon fasciatus
Lycodon fausti
Lycodon ferroni
Lycodon flavicollis
Lycodon flavomaculatus
Lycodon flavozonatus
Lycodon futsingensis
Lycodon gammiei
Lycodon gongshan
Lycodon gracilis
Lycodon hypsirhinoides
Lycodon jara
Lycodon kundui
Lycodon laoensis
Lycodon liuchengchaoi
Lycodon mackinnoni
Lycodon meridionalis
Lycodon muelleri
Lycodon multifasciatus
Lycodon multizonatus
Lycodon nympha
Lycodon ophiophagus
Lycodon orientalis
Lycodon osmanhilli
Lycodon paucifasciatus
Lycodon philippinus
Lycodon rosozonatus
Lycodon rufozonatus
Lycodon ruhstrati
Lycodon semicarinatus
Lycodon septentrionalis
Lycodon sidiki
Lycodon solivagus
Lycodon stormi
Lycodon striatus
Lycodon subannulatus
Lycodon subcinctus
Lycodon synaptor
Lycodon tessellatus
Lycodon tiwarii
Lycodon travancoricus
Lycodon tristrigatus
Lycodon zawi
Lycodon zoosvictoriae
Lycodonomorphus
Lycodonomorphus bicolor
Lycodonomorphus inornatus
Lycodonomorphus laevissimus
Lycodonomorphus leleupi
Lycodonomorphus mlanjensis
Lycodonomorphus obscuriventris
Lycodonomorphus rufulus
Lycodonomorphus subtaeniatus
Lycodonomorphus whytii
Lycodryas
Lycodryas carleti
Lycodryas citrinus
Lycodryas cococola
Lycodryas gaimardi
Lycodryas granuliceps
Lycodryas guentheri
Lycodryas inopinae
Lycodryas inornatus
Lycodryas maculatus
Lycodryas pseudogranuliceps
Lycognathophis
Lycognathophis seychellensis
Lycophidion
Lycophidion acutirostre
Lycophidion albomaculatum
Lycophidion capense
Lycophidion depressirostre
Lycophidion hellmichi
Lycophidion irroratum
Lycophidion laterale
Lycophidion meleagre
Lycophidion multimaculatum
Lycophidion namibianum
Lycophidion nanum
Lycophidion nigromaculatum
Lycophidion ornatum
Lycophidion pembanum
Lycophidion pygmaeum
Lycophidion semiannule
Lycophidion semicinctum
Lycophidion taylori
Lycophidion uzungwense
Lycophidion variegatum
Lygophis
Lygophis anomalus
Lygophis dilepis
Lygophis elegantissimus
Lygophis flavifrenatus
Lygophis lineatus
Lygophis meridionalis
Lygophis paucidens
Lygophis vanzolinii
Lytorhynchus
Lytorhynchus diadema
Lytorhynchus gasperetti
Lytorhynchus kennedyi
Lytorhynchus levitoni
Lytorhynchus maynardi
Lytorhynchus paradoxus
Lytorhynchus ridgewayi
Macrelaps
Macrelaps microlepidotus
Macrocalamus
Macrocalamus chanardi
Macrocalamus gentingensis
Macrocalamus jasoni
Macrocalamus lateralis
Macrocalamus schulzi
Macrocalamus tweediei
Macrocalamus vogeli
Macropisthodon
Macropisthodon flaviceps
Macropisthodon plumbicolor
Macropisthodon rhodomelas
Macropisthodon rudis
Macroprotodon
Macroprotodon abubakeri
Macroprotodon brevis
Macroprotodon cucullatus
Macroprotodon mauritanicus
Macrovipera
Macrovipera lebetinus
Macrovipera razii
Macrovipera schweizeri
Madagascarophis
Madagascarophis colubrinus
Madagascarophis fuchsi
Madagascarophis lolo
Madagascarophis meridionalis
Madagascarophis ocellatus
Madatyphlops
Madatyphlops albanalis
Madatyphlops andasibensis
Madatyphlops arenarius
Madatyphlops boettgeri
Madatyphlops cariei
Madatyphlops comorensis
Madatyphlops decorsei
Madatyphlops domerguei
Madatyphlops madagascariensis
Madatyphlops microcephalus
Madatyphlops mucronatus
Madatyphlops ocularis
Madatyphlops rajeryi
Madatyphlops reuteri
Magliophis
Magliophis exiguum
Magliophis stahli
Malayopython
Malayopython reticulatus
Malayopython timoriensis
Malayotyphlops
Malayotyphlops andyi
Malayotyphlops canlaonensis
Malayotyphlops castanotus
Malayotyphlops collaris
Malayotyphlops denrorum
Malayotyphlops hypogius
Malayotyphlops koekkoeki
Malayotyphlops kraalii
Malayotyphlops luzonensis
Malayotyphlops manilae
Malayotyphlops ruber
Malayotyphlops ruficaudus
Malpolon
Malpolon insignitus
Malpolon moilensis
Malpolon monspessulanus
Manolepis
Manolepis putnami
Masticophis
Masticophis anthonyi
Masticophis aurigulus
Masticophis barbouri
Masticophis bilineatus
Masticophis flagellum
Masticophis fuliginosus
Masticophis lateralis
Masticophis mentovarius
Masticophis schotti
Masticophis slevini
Masticophis taeniatus
Mastigodryas
Mastigodryas alternatus
Mastigodryas amarali
Mastigodryas bifossatus
Mastigodryas boddaerti
Mastigodryas bruesi
Mastigodryas cliftoni
Mastigodryas danieli
Mastigodryas dorsalis
Mastigodryas heathii
Mastigodryas melanolomus
Mastigodryas moratoi
Mastigodryas pleii
Mastigodryas pulchriceps
Mastigodryas reticulatus
Meizodon
Meizodon coronatus
Meizodon krameri
Meizodon plumbiceps
Meizodon regularis
Meizodon semiornatus
Melanophidium
Melanophidium bilineatum
Melanophidium khairei
Melanophidium punctatum
Melanophidium wynaudense
Micrelaps
Micrelaps bicoloratus
Micrelaps muelleri
Micrelaps tchernovi
Micrelaps vaillanti
Micropechis
Micropechis ikaheca
Micropisthodon
Micropisthodon ochraceus
Micruroides
Micruroides euryxanthus
Micrurus
Micrurus albicinctus
Micrurus alleni
Micrurus altirostris
Micrurus ancoralis
Micrurus annellatus
Micrurus averyi
Micrurus baliocoryphus
Micrurus bernadi
Micrurus bocourti
Micrurus bogerti
Micrurus boicora
Micrurus brasiliensis
Micrurus browni
Micrurus camilae
Micrurus catamayensis
Micrurus circinalis
Micrurus clarki
Micrurus collaris
Micrurus corallinus
Micrurus decoratus
Micrurus diana
Micrurus diastema
Micrurus dissoleucus
Micrurus distans
Micrurus dumerilii
Micrurus elegans
Micrurus ephippifer
Micrurus filiformis
Micrurus frontalis
Micrurus fulvius
Micrurus hemprichii
Micrurus hippocrepis
Micrurus ibiboboca
Micrurus isozonus
Micrurus langsdorffi
Micrurus laticollaris
Micrurus latifasciatus
Micrurus lemniscatus
Micrurus limbatus
Micrurus margaritiferus
Micrurus medemi
Micrurus meridensis
Micrurus mertensi
Micrurus mipartitus
Micrurus mosquitensis
Micrurus multifasciatus
Micrurus multiscutatus
Micrurus narduccii
Micrurus nattereri
Micrurus nebularis
Micrurus nigrocinctus
Micrurus obscurus
Micrurus oligoanellatus
Micrurus ornatissimus
Micrurus pacaraimae
Micrurus pachecogili
Micrurus paraensis
Micrurus peruvianus
Micrurus petersi
Micrurus potyguara
Micrurus proximans
Micrurus psyches
Micrurus putumayensis
Micrurus pyrrhocryptus
Micrurus remotus
Micrurus renjifoi
Micrurus ruatanus
Micrurus sangilensis
Micrurus scutiventris
Micrurus serranus
Micrurus silviae
Micrurus spixii
Micrurus spurrelli
Micrurus steindachneri
Micrurus stewarti
Micrurus stuarti
Micrurus surinamensis
Micrurus tener
Micrurus tikuna
Micrurus tschudii
Mimophis
Mimophis mahfalensis
Mimophis occultus
Mintonophis
Mintonophis pakistanicus
Miralia
Miralia alternans
Mitophis
Mitophis asbolepis
Mitophis calypso
Mitophis leptipileptus
Mitophis pyrites
Mixcoatlus
Mixcoatlus barbouri
Mixcoatlus browni
Mixcoatlus melanurus
Montaspis
Montaspis gilvomaculata
Montatheris
Montatheris hindii
Montivipera
Montivipera albizona
Montivipera bornmuelleri
Montivipera bulgardaghica
Montivipera kuhrangica
Montivipera latifii
Montivipera raddei
Montivipera wagneri
Montivipera xanthina
Mopanveldophis
Mopanveldophis zebrinus
Morelia
Morelia bredli
Morelia carinata
Morelia spilota
Morelia viridis
Muhtarophis
Muhtarophis barani
Mussurana
Mussurana bicolor
Mussurana montana
Mussurana quimi
Myersophis
Myersophis alpestris
Myriopholis
Myriopholis adleri
Myriopholis albiventer
Myriopholis algeriensis
Myriopholis blanfordi
Myriopholis boueti
Myriopholis braccianii
Myriopholis burii
Myriopholis cairi
Myriopholis erythraeus
Myriopholis filiformis
Myriopholis ionidesi
Myriopholis lanzai
Myriopholis longicauda
Myriopholis macrorhyncha
Myriopholis macrura
Myriopholis narirostris
Myriopholis nursii
Myriopholis parkeri
Myriopholis perreti
Myriopholis rouxestevae
Myriopholis tanae
Myriopholis wilsoni
Myriopholis yemenica
Myron
Myron karnsi
Myron resetari
Myron richardsonii
Myrrophis
Myrrophis bennettii
Myrrophis chinensis
Naja
Naja anchietae
Naja annulata
Naja annulifera
Naja arabica
Naja ashei
Naja atra
Naja christyi
Naja guineensis
Naja haje
Naja kaouthia
Naja katiensis
Naja mandalayensis
Naja melanoleuca
Naja mossambica
Naja multifasciata
Naja naja
Naja nigricincta
Naja nigricollis
Naja nivea
Naja nubiae
Naja oxiana
Naja pallida
Naja peroescobari
Naja philippinensis
Naja sagittifera
Naja samarensis
Naja savannula
Naja senegalensis
Naja siamensis
Naja sputatrix
Naja subfulva
Naja sumatrana
Namibiana
Namibiana gracilior
Namibiana labialis
Namibiana latifrons
Namibiana occidentalis
Namibiana rostrata
Natriciteres
Natriciteres bipostocularis
Natriciteres fuliginoides
Natriciteres olivacea
Natriciteres pembana
Natriciteres sylvatica
Natriciteres variegata
Natrix
Natrix astreptophora
Natrix helvetica
Natrix maura
Natrix natrix
Natrix tessellata
Neelaps
Neelaps calonotus
Nerodia
Nerodia clarkii
Nerodia cyclopion
Nerodia erythrogaster
Nerodia fasciata
Nerodia floridana
Nerodia harteri
Nerodia paucimaculata
Nerodia rhombifer
Nerodia sipedon
Nerodia taxispilota
Ninia
Ninia atrata
Ninia celata
Ninia diademata
Ninia espinali
Ninia franciscoi
Ninia hudsoni
Ninia maculata
Ninia pavimentata
Ninia psephota
Ninia sebae
Ninia teresitae
Notechis
Notechis scutatus
Nothopsis
Nothopsis rugosus
Nyctophilopython
Nyctophilopython oenpelliensis
Ogmodon
Ogmodon vitianus
Oligodon
Oligodon affinis
Oligodon albocinctus
Oligodon ancorus
Oligodon annamensis
Oligodon annulifer
Oligodon arenarius
Oligodon arnensis
Oligodon barroni
Oligodon bitorquatus
Oligodon booliati
Oligodon brevicauda
Oligodon calamarius
Oligodon catenatus
Oligodon cattienensis
Oligodon chinensis
Oligodon cinereus
Oligodon condaoensis
Oligodon cruentatus
Oligodon culaochamensis
Oligodon cyclurus
Oligodon deuvei
Oligodon dorsalis
Oligodon eberhardti
Oligodon erythrogaster
Oligodon erythrorhachis
Oligodon everetti
Oligodon fasciolatus
Oligodon forbesi
Oligodon formosanus
Oligodon hamptoni
Oligodon huahin
Oligodon inornatus
Oligodon jintakunei
Oligodon joynsoni
Oligodon juglandifer
Oligodon kampucheaensis
Oligodon kheriensis
Oligodon lacroixi
Oligodon lungshenensis
Oligodon macrurus
Oligodon maculatus
Oligodon mcdougalli
Oligodon melaneus
Oligodon melanozonatus
Oligodon meyerinkii
Oligodon modestus
Oligodon moricei
Oligodon mouhoti
Oligodon nagao
Oligodon nikhili
Oligodon notospilus
Oligodon ocellatus
Oligodon octolineatus
Oligodon ornatus
Oligodon perkinsi
Oligodon petronellae
Oligodon planiceps
Oligodon praefrontalis
Oligodon propinquus
Oligodon pseudotaeniatus
Oligodon pulcherrimus
Oligodon purpurascens
Oligodon saintgironsi
Oligodon saiyok
Oligodon signatus
Oligodon splendidus
Oligodon sublineatus
Oligodon taeniatus
Oligodon taeniolatus
Oligodon theobaldi
Oligodon torquatus
Oligodon travancoricus
Oligodon trilineatus
Oligodon unicolor
Oligodon venustus
Oligodon vertebralis
Oligodon waandersi
Oligodon wagneri
Oligodon woodmasoni
Omoadiphas
Omoadiphas aurula
Omoadiphas cannula
Omoadiphas texiguatensis
Oocatochus
Oocatochus rufodorsatus
Opheodrys
Opheodrys aestivus
Opheodrys vernalis
Ophiophagus
Ophiophagus hannah
Ophryacus
Ophryacus smaragdinus
Ophryacus sphenophrys
Ophryacus undulatus
Opisthotropis
Opisthotropis alcalai
Opisthotropis andersonii
Opisthotropis atra
Opisthotropis balteata
Opisthotropis cheni
Opisthotropis cucae
Opisthotropis daovantieni
Opisthotropis durandi
Opisthotropis guangxiensis
Opisthotropis jacobi
Opisthotropis kikuzatoi
Opisthotropis kuatunensis
Opisthotropis lateralis
Opisthotropis latouchii
Opisthotropis laui
Opisthotropis maculosa
Opisthotropis maxwelli
Opisthotropis rugosa
Opisthotropis shenzhenensis
Opisthotropis spenceri
Opisthotropis tamdaoensis
Opisthotropis typica
Opisthotropis voquyi
Opisthotropis zhaoermii
Oreocalamus
Oreocalamus hanitschi
Oreocryptophis
Oreocryptophis porphyraceus
Orientocoluber
Orientocoluber spinalis
Ovophis
Ovophis convictus
Ovophis makazayazaya
Ovophis monticola
Ovophis okinavensis
Ovophis tonkinensis
Ovophis zayuensis
Oxybelis
Oxybelis aeneus
Oxybelis brevirostris
Oxybelis fulgidus
Oxybelis wilsoni
Oxyrhabdium
Oxyrhabdium leporinum
Oxyrhabdium modestum
Oxyrhopus
Oxyrhopus clathratus
Oxyrhopus doliatus
Oxyrhopus erdisii
Oxyrhopus fitzingeri
Oxyrhopus formosus
Oxyrhopus guibei
Oxyrhopus leucomelas
Oxyrhopus marcapatae
Oxyrhopus melanogenys
Oxyrhopus occipitalis
Oxyrhopus petolarius
Oxyrhopus rhombifer
Oxyrhopus trigeminus
Oxyrhopus vanidicus
Oxyuranus
Oxyuranus microlepidotus
Oxyuranus scutellatus
Oxyuranus temporalis
Pantherophis
Pantherophis alleghaniensis
Pantherophis bairdi
Pantherophis emoryi
Pantherophis guttatus
Pantherophis obsoletus
Pantherophis quadrivittatus
Pantherophis ramspotti
Pantherophis slowinskii
Pantherophis vulpinus
Parafimbrios
Parafimbrios lao
Parahydrophis
Parahydrophis mertoni
Paraphimophis
Paraphimophis rusticus
Parapistocalamus
Parapistocalamus hedigeri
Pararhadinaea
Pararhadinaea melanogaster
Parastenophis
Parastenophis betsileanus
Parasuta
Parasuta dwyeri
Parasuta flagellum
Parasuta gouldii
Parasuta monachus
Parasuta nigriceps
Parasuta spectabilis
Paratapinophis
Paratapinophis praemaxillaris
Pareas
Pareas atayal
Pareas boulengeri
Pareas carinatus
Pareas chinensis
Pareas formosensis
Pareas hamptoni
Pareas iwasakii
Pareas komaii
Pareas margaritophorus
Pareas monticola
Pareas nigriceps
Pareas nuchalis
Pareas stanleyi
Pareas vindumi
Paroplocephalus
Paroplocephalus atriceps
Phalotris
Phalotris bilineatus
Phalotris concolor
Phalotris cuyanus
Phalotris labiomaculatus
Phalotris lativittatus
Phalotris lemniscatus
Phalotris matogrossensis
Phalotris mertensi
Phalotris multipunctatus
Phalotris nasutus
Phalotris nigrilatus
Phalotris normanscotti
Phalotris reticulatus
Phalotris sansebastiani
Phalotris tricolor
Philodryas
Philodryas aestiva
Philodryas agassizii
Philodryas amaru
Philodryas argentea
Philodryas arnaldoi
Philodryas baroni
Philodryas boliviana
Philodryas chamissonis
Philodryas cordata
Philodryas erlandi
Philodryas georgeboulengeri
Philodryas laticeps
Philodryas livida
Philodryas mattogrossensis
Philodryas nattereri
Philodryas olfersii
Philodryas patagoniensis
Philodryas psammophidea
Philodryas simonsii
Philodryas tachymenoides
Philodryas trilineata
Philodryas varia
Philodryas viridissima
Philothamnus
Philothamnus angolensis
Philothamnus battersbyi
Philothamnus bequaerti
Philothamnus carinatus
Philothamnus dorsalis
Philothamnus girardi
Philothamnus heterodermus
Philothamnus heterolepidotus
Philothamnus hoplogaster
Philothamnus hughesi
Philothamnus irregularis
Philothamnus macrops
Philothamnus natalensis
Philothamnus nitidus
Philothamnus occidentalis
Philothamnus ornatus
Philothamnus pobeguini
Philothamnus punctatus
Philothamnus ruandae
Philothamnus semivariegatus
Philothamnus thomensis
Phimophis
Phimophis guerini
Phimophis guianensis
Phimophis vittatus
Phisalixella
Phisalixella arctifasciata
Phisalixella iarakaensis
Phisalixella tulearensis
Phisalixella variabilis
Phrynonax
Phrynonax poecilonotus
Phrynonax polylepis
Phrynonax shropshirei
Phyllorhynchus
Phyllorhynchus browni
Phyllorhynchus decurtatus
Phytolopsis
Phytolopsis punctata
Pituophis
Pituophis catenifer
Pituophis deppei
Pituophis insulanus
Pituophis lineaticollis
Pituophis melanoleucus
Pituophis ruthveni
Pituophis vertebralis
Plagiopholis
Plagiopholis blakewayi
Plagiopholis delacouri
Plagiopholis nuchalis
Plagiopholis styani
Platyceps
Platyceps afarensis
Platyceps bholanathi
Platyceps brevis
Platyceps collaris
Platyceps elegantissimus
Platyceps florulentus
Platyceps gracilis
Platyceps insulanus
Platyceps karelini
Platyceps ladacensis
Platyceps largeni
Platyceps messanai
Platyceps najadum
Platyceps noeli
Platyceps rhodorachis
Platyceps rogersi
Platyceps saharicus
Platyceps scortecci
Platyceps sinai
Platyceps sindhensis
Platyceps somalicus
Platyceps taylori
Platyceps tessellata
Platyceps thomasi
Platyceps variabilis
Platyceps ventromaculatus
Platyplectrurus
Platyplectrurus madurensis
Platyplectrurus trilineatus
Plectrurus
Plectrurus aureus
Plectrurus guentheri
Plectrurus perroteti
Plesiodipsas
Plesiodipsas perijanensis
Pliocercus
Pliocercus elapoides
Pliocercus euryzonus
Poecilopholis
Poecilopholis cameronensis
Polemon
Polemon acanthias
Polemon barthii
Polemon bocourti
Polemon christyi
Polemon collaris
Polemon fulvicollis
Polemon gabonensis
Polemon gracilis
Polemon graueri
Polemon griseiceps
Polemon neuwiedi
Polemon notatus
Polemon robustus
Porthidium
Porthidium arcosae
Porthidium dunni
Porthidium hespere
Porthidium lansbergii
Porthidium nasutum
Porthidium ophryomegas
Porthidium porrasi
Porthidium volcanicum
Porthidium yucatanicum
Proatheris
Proatheris superciliaris
Prosymna
Prosymna ambigua
Prosymna angolensis
Prosymna bivittata
Prosymna frontalis
Prosymna greigerti
Prosymna janii
Prosymna lineata
Prosymna meleagris
Prosymna ornatissima
Prosymna pitmani
Prosymna ruspolii
Prosymna semifasciata
Prosymna somalica
Prosymna stuhlmanni
Prosymna sundevalli
Prosymna visseri
Protobothrops
Protobothrops cornutus
Protobothrops dabieshanensis
Protobothrops elegans
Protobothrops flavoviridis
Protobothrops himalayanus
Protobothrops jerdonii
Protobothrops kaulbacki
Protobothrops mangshanensis
Protobothrops maolanensis
Protobothrops mucrosquamatus
Protobothrops sieversorum
Protobothrops tokarensis
Protobothrops trungkhanhensis
Protobothrops xiangchengensis
Psammodynastes
Psammodynastes pictus
Psammodynastes pulverulentus
Psammophis
Psammophis aegyptius
Psammophis angolensis
Psammophis ansorgii
Psammophis biseriatus
Psammophis brevirostris
Psammophis condanarus
Psammophis crucifer
Psammophis elegans
Psammophis indochinensis
Psammophis jallae
Psammophis leightoni
Psammophis leithii
Psammophis leopardinus
Psammophis lineatus
Psammophis lineolatus
Psammophis longifrons
Psammophis mossambicus
Psammophis namibensis
Psammophis notostictus
Psammophis occidentalis
Psammophis orientalis
Psammophis phillipsii
Psammophis praeornatus
Psammophis pulcher
Psammophis punctulatus
Psammophis rukwae
Psammophis schokari
Psammophis sibilans
Psammophis subtaeniatus
Psammophis sudanensis
Psammophis tanganicus
Psammophis trigrammus
Psammophis trinasalis
Psammophis zambiensis
Psammophylax
Psammophylax acutus
Psammophylax multisquamis
Psammophylax rhombeatus
Psammophylax togoensis
Psammophylax tritaeniatus
Psammophylax variabilis
Pseudalsophis
Pseudalsophis biserialis
Pseudalsophis darwini
Pseudalsophis dorsalis
Pseudalsophis elegans
Pseudalsophis hephaestus
Pseudalsophis hoodensis
Pseudalsophis occidentalis
Pseudalsophis slevini
Pseudalsophis steindachneri
Pseudalsophis thomasi
Pseudaspis
Pseudaspis cana
Pseudechis
Pseudechis australis
Pseudechis butleri
Pseudechis colletti
Pseudechis guttatus
Pseudechis pailsei
Pseudechis papuanus
Pseudechis porphyriacus
Pseudechis rossignolii
Pseudechis weigeli
Pseudelaphe
Pseudelaphe flavirufa
Pseudelaphe phaescens
Pseudoboa
Pseudoboa coronata
Pseudoboa haasi
Pseudoboa martinsi
Pseudoboa neuwiedii
Pseudoboa nigra
Pseudoboa serrana
Pseudoboodon
Pseudoboodon boehmei
Pseudoboodon gascae
Pseudoboodon lemniscatus
Pseudoboodon sandfordorum
Pseudocerastes
Pseudocerastes fieldi
Pseudocerastes persicus
Pseudocerastes urarachnoides
Pseudoeryx
Pseudoeryx plicatilis
Pseudoeryx relictualis
Pseudoferania
Pseudoferania polylepis
Pseudoficimia
Pseudoficimia frontalis
Pseudohaje
Pseudohaje goldii
Pseudohaje nigra
Pseudoleptodeira
Pseudoleptodeira latifasciata
Pseudonaja
Pseudonaja affinis
Pseudonaja aspidorhyncha
Pseudonaja guttata
Pseudonaja inframacula
Pseudonaja ingrami
Pseudonaja mengdeni
Pseudonaja modesta
Pseudonaja nuchalis
Pseudonaja textilis
Pseudoplectrurus
Pseudoplectrurus canaricus
Pseudorabdion
Pseudorabdion albonuchalis
Pseudorabdion ater
Pseudorabdion collaris
Pseudorabdion eiselti
Pseudorabdion longiceps
Pseudorabdion mcnamarae
Pseudorabdion modiglianii
Pseudorabdion montanum
Pseudorabdion oxycephalum
Pseudorabdion sarasinorum
Pseudorabdion saravacense
Pseudorabdion sirambense
Pseudorabdion talonuran
Pseudorabdion taylori
Pseudorabdion torquatum
Pseudotomodon
Pseudotomodon trigonatus
Pseudoxenodon
Pseudoxenodon bambusicola
Pseudoxenodon baramensis
Pseudoxenodon inornatus
Pseudoxenodon karlschmidti
Pseudoxenodon macrops
Pseudoxenodon stejnegeri
Pseudoxyrhopus
Pseudoxyrhopus ambreensis
Pseudoxyrhopus analabe
Pseudoxyrhopus ankafinaensis
Pseudoxyrhopus heterurus
Pseudoxyrhopus imerinae
Pseudoxyrhopus kely
Pseudoxyrhopus microps
Pseudoxyrhopus oblectator
Pseudoxyrhopus quinquelineatus
Pseudoxyrhopus sokosoko
Pseudoxyrhopus tritaeniatus
Psomophis
Psomophis genimaculatus
Psomophis joberti
Psomophis obtusus
Ptyas
Ptyas carinata
Ptyas dhumnades
Ptyas dipsas
Ptyas doriae
Ptyas fusca
Ptyas herminae
Ptyas korros
Ptyas luzonensis
Ptyas major
Ptyas mucosa
Ptyas multicinctus
Ptyas nigromarginata
Ptyas semicarinatus
Ptychophis
Ptychophis flavovirgatus
Python
Python anchietae
Python bivittatus
Python breitensteini
Python brongersmai
Python curtus
Python kyaiktiyo
Python molurus
Python natalensis
Python regius
Python sebae
Pythonodipsas
Pythonodipsas carinata
Rabdion
Rabdion forsteni
Rabdion grovesi
Raclitia
Raclitia indica
Ramphotyphlops
Ramphotyphlops acuticaudus
Ramphotyphlops adocetus
Ramphotyphlops angusticeps
Ramphotyphlops becki
Ramphotyphlops bipartitus
Ramphotyphlops conradi
Ramphotyphlops cumingii
Ramphotyphlops depressus
Ramphotyphlops exocoeti
Ramphotyphlops flaviventer
Ramphotyphlops hatmaliyeb
Ramphotyphlops lineatus
Ramphotyphlops lorenzi
Ramphotyphlops mansuetus
Ramphotyphlops marxi
Ramphotyphlops multilineatus
Ramphotyphlops olivaceus
Ramphotyphlops similis
Ramphotyphlops suluensis
Ramphotyphlops supranasalis
Ramphotyphlops willeyi
Regina
Regina grahamii
Regina septemvittata
Rena
Rena boettgeri
Rena bressoni
Rena dissecta
Rena dugesii
Rena dulcis
Rena humilis
Rena iversoni
Rena maxima
Rena myopica
Rena segrega
Rena unguirostris
Rhabdophis
Rhabdophis adleri
Rhabdophis akraios
Rhabdophis angeli
Rhabdophis auriculata
Rhabdophis barbouri
Rhabdophis callichroma
Rhabdophis callistus
Rhabdophis chrysargoides
Rhabdophis chrysargos
Rhabdophis conspicillatus
Rhabdophis guangdongensis
Rhabdophis himalayanus
Rhabdophis leonardi
Rhabdophis lineatus
Rhabdophis murudensis
Rhabdophis nigrocinctus
Rhabdophis nuchalis
Rhabdophis pentasupralabialis
Rhabdophis spilogaster
Rhabdophis subminiatus
Rhabdophis swinhonis
Rhabdophis tigrinus
Rhabdops
Rhabdops aquaticus
Rhabdops bicolor
Rhabdops olivaceus
Rhachidelus
Rhachidelus brazili
Rhadinaea
Rhadinaea bogertorum
Rhadinaea calligaster
Rhadinaea cuneata
Rhadinaea decorata
Rhadinaea flavilata
Rhadinaea forbesi
Rhadinaea fulvivittis
Rhadinaea gaigeae
Rhadinaea hesperia
Rhadinaea laureata
Rhadinaea macdougalli
Rhadinaea marcellae
Rhadinaea montana
Rhadinaea myersi
Rhadinaea nuchalis
Rhadinaea omiltemana
Rhadinaea pulveriventris
Rhadinaea quinquelineata
Rhadinaea sargenti
Rhadinaea taeniata
Rhadinaea vermiculaticeps
Rhadinella
Rhadinella anachoreta
Rhadinella donaji
Rhadinella dysmica
Rhadinella godmani
Rhadinella hannsteini
Rhadinella hempsteadae
Rhadinella kanalchutchan
Rhadinella kinkelini
Rhadinella lachrymans
Rhadinella lisyae
Rhadinella montecristi
Rhadinella pegosalyta
Rhadinella pilonaorum
Rhadinella posadasi
Rhadinella rogerromani
Rhadinella schistosa
Rhadinella serperaster
Rhadinella stadelmani
Rhadinella tolpanorum
Rhadinella xerophila
Rhadinophanes
Rhadinophanes monticola
Rhamnophis
Rhamnophis aethiopissa
Rhamnophis batesii
Rhamphiophis
Rhamphiophis oxyrhynchus
Rhamphiophis rostratus
Rhamphiophis rubropunctatus
Rhinobothryum
Rhinobothryum bovallii
Rhinobothryum lentiginosum
Rhinocheilus
Rhinocheilus antonii
Rhinocheilus etheridgei
Rhinocheilus lecontei
Rhinoguinea
Rhinoguinea magna
Rhinoleptus
Rhinoleptus koniagui
Rhinophis
Rhinophis blythii
Rhinophis dorsimaculatus
Rhinophis drummondhayi
Rhinophis erangaviraji
Rhinophis fergusonianus
Rhinophis goweri
Rhinophis homolepis
Rhinophis lineatus
Rhinophis melanogaster
Rhinophis oxyrhynchus
Rhinophis philippinus
Rhinophis phillipsi
Rhinophis porrectus
Rhinophis punctatus
Rhinophis roshanpererai
Rhinophis saffragamus
Rhinophis sanguineus
Rhinophis travancoricus
Rhinophis tricolorata
Rhinophis zigzag
Rhinoplocephalus
Rhinoplocephalus bicolor
Rhinotyphlops
Rhinotyphlops ataeniatus
Rhinotyphlops boylei
Rhinotyphlops lalandei
Rhinotyphlops leucocephalus
Rhinotyphlops schinzi
Rhinotyphlops scortecci
Rhinotyphlops unitaeniatus
Rhynchocalamus
Rhynchocalamus arabicus
Rhynchocalamus dayanae
Rhynchocalamus ilamensis
Rhynchocalamus melanocephalus
Rhynchocalamus satunini
Rodriguesophis
Rodriguesophis chui
Rodriguesophis iglesiasi
Rodriguesophis scriptorcibatus
Salomonelaps
Salomonelaps par
Salvadora
Salvadora bairdi
Salvadora deserticola
Salvadora grahamiae
Salvadora hexalepis
Salvadora intermedia
Salvadora lemniscata
Salvadora mexicana
Sanzinia
Sanzinia madagascariensis
Sanzinia volontany
Saphenophis
Saphenophis antioquiensis
Saphenophis atahuallpae
Saphenophis boursieri
Saphenophis sneiderni
Saphenophis tristriatus
Scaphiodontophis
Scaphiodontophis annulatus
Scaphiodontophis venustissimus
Scaphiophis
Scaphiophis albopunctatus
Scaphiophis raffreyi
Scolecophis
Scolecophis atrocinctus
Senticolis
Senticolis triaspis
Siagonodon
Siagonodon acutirostris
Siagonodon borrichianus
Siagonodon cupinensis
Siagonodon septemstriatus
Sibon
Sibon annulatus
Sibon anthracops
Sibon argus
Sibon bevridgelyi
Sibon carri
Sibon dimidiatus
Sibon dunni
Sibon lamari
Sibon linearis
Sibon longifrenis
Sibon manzanaresi
Sibon merendonensis
Sibon miskitus
Sibon nebulatus
Sibon noalamina
Sibon perissostichon
Sibon sanniolus
Sibynophis
Sibynophis bistrigatus
Sibynophis bivittatus
Sibynophis chinensis
Sibynophis collaris
Sibynophis geminatus
Sibynophis melanocephalus
Sibynophis sagittarius
Sibynophis subpunctatus
Sibynophis triangularis
Simalia
Simalia amethistina
Simalia boeleni
Simalia clastolepis
Simalia kinghorni
Simalia nauta
Simalia tracyae
Simophis
Simophis rhinostoma
Simoselaps
Simoselaps anomalus
Simoselaps bertholdi
Simoselaps bimaculatus
Simoselaps littoralis
Simoselaps minimus
Sinomicrurus
Sinomicrurus hatori
Sinomicrurus houi
Sinomicrurus japonicus
Sinomicrurus kelloggi
Sinomicrurus macclellandi
Sinomicrurus sauteri
Sinonatrix
Sinonatrix aequifasciata
Sinonatrix annularis
Sinonatrix percarinata
Sinonatrix yunnanensis
Siphlophis
Siphlophis ayauma
Siphlophis cervinus
Siphlophis compressus
Siphlophis leucocephalus
Siphlophis longicaudatus
Siphlophis pulcher
Siphlophis worontzowi
Sistrurus
Sistrurus catenatus
Sistrurus miliarius
Sistrurus tergeminus
Sonora
Sonora aemula
Sonora michoacanensis
Sonora mutabilis
Sonora semiannulata
Sordellina
Sordellina punctata
Spalerosophis
Spalerosophis arenarius
Spalerosophis atriceps
Spalerosophis diadema
Spalerosophis dolichospilus
Spalerosophis josephscorteccii
Spalerosophis microlepis
Spilotes
Spilotes pullatus
Spilotes sulphureus
Stegonotus
Stegonotus admiraltiensis
Stegonotus aruensis
Stegonotus australis
Stegonotus batjanensis
Stegonotus borneensis
Stegonotus cucullatus
Stegonotus derooijae
Stegonotus diehli
Stegonotus florensis
Stegonotus guentheri
Stegonotus heterurus
Stegonotus iridis
Stegonotus keyensis
Stegonotus lividus
Stegonotus melanolabiatus
Stegonotus modestus
Stegonotus muelleri
Stegonotus parvus
Stegonotus poechi
Stegonotus reticulatus
Stegonotus sutteri
Stenorrhina
Stenorrhina degenhardtii
Stenorrhina freminvillei
Stichophanes
Stichophanes ningshaanensis
Stoliczkia
Stoliczkia borneensis
Stoliczkia khasiensis
Storeria
Storeria dekayi
Storeria hidalgoensis
Storeria occipitomaculata
Storeria storerioides
Storeria victa
Subsessor
Subsessor bocourti
Sumatranus
Sumatranus albomaculata
Sundatyphlops
Sundatyphlops polygrammicus
Suta
Suta fasciata
Suta ordensis
Suta punctata
Suta suta
Symphimus
Symphimus leucostomus
Symphimus mayae
Sympholis
Sympholis lippiens
Synophis
Synophis bicolor
Synophis bogerti
Synophis calamitus
Synophis insulomontanus
Synophis lasallei
Synophis niceforomariae
Synophis plectovertebralis
Synophis zaheri
Synophis zamora
Tachymenis
Tachymenis affinis
Tachymenis attenuata
Tachymenis chilensis
Tachymenis elongata
Tachymenis peruviana
Tachymenis tarmensis
Taeniophallus
Taeniophallus affinis
Taeniophallus bilineatus
Taeniophallus brevirostris
Taeniophallus nebularis
Taeniophallus nicagus
Taeniophallus occipitalis
Taeniophallus persimilis
Taeniophallus poecilopogon
Taeniophallus quadriocellatus
Tantalophis
Tantalophis discolor
Tantilla
Tantilla albiceps
Tantilla alticola
Tantilla andinista
Tantilla armillata
Tantilla atriceps
Tantilla bairdi
Tantilla berguidoi
Tantilla bocourti
Tantilla boipiranga
Tantilla brevicauda
Tantilla briggsi
Tantilla calamarina
Tantilla capistrata
Tantilla cascadae
Tantilla ceboruca
Tantilla coronadoi
Tantilla coronata
Tantilla cucullata
Tantilla cuniculator
Tantilla deppei
Tantilla excelsa
Tantilla flavilineata
Tantilla gottei
Tantilla gracilis
Tantilla hendersoni
Tantilla hobartsmithi
Tantilla impensa
Tantilla insulamontana
Tantilla jani
Tantilla johnsoni
Tantilla lempira
Tantilla melanocephala
Tantilla miyatai
Tantilla moesta
Tantilla nigra
Tantilla nigriceps
Tantilla oaxacae
Tantilla olympia
Tantilla oolitica
Tantilla petersi
Tantilla planiceps
Tantilla psittaca
Tantilla relicta
Tantilla reticulata
Tantilla robusta
Tantilla rubra
Tantilla ruficeps
Tantilla schistosa
Tantilla semicincta
Tantilla sertula
Tantilla shawi
Tantilla slavensi
Tantilla stenigrammi
Tantilla striata
Tantilla supracincta
Tantilla taeniata
Tantilla tayrae
Tantilla tecta
Tantilla tjiasmantoi
Tantilla trilineata
Tantilla triseriata
Tantilla tritaeniata
Tantilla vermiformis
Tantilla vulcani
Tantilla wilcoxi
Tantilla yaquia
Tantillita
Tantillita brevissima
Tantillita canula
Tantillita lintoni
Telescopus
Telescopus beetzi
Telescopus dhara
Telescopus fallax
Telescopus finkeldeyi
Telescopus gezirae
Telescopus hoogstraali
Telescopus nigriceps
Telescopus obtusus
Telescopus pulcher
Telescopus rhinopoma
Telescopus semiannulatus
Telescopus tessellatus
Telescopus tripolitanus
Telescopus variegatus
Teretrurus
Teretrurus rhodogaster
Teretrurus sanguineus
Tetracheilostoma
Tetracheilostoma bilineatum
Tetracheilostoma breuili
Tetracheilostoma carlae
Tetralepis
Tetralepis fruhstorferi
Thalassophis
Thalassophis anomalus
Thamnodynastes
Thamnodynastes almae
Thamnodynastes ceibae
Thamnodynastes chaquensis
Thamnodynastes chimanta
Thamnodynastes corocoroensis
Thamnodynastes dixoni
Thamnodynastes duida
Thamnodynastes gambotensis
Thamnodynastes hypoconia
Thamnodynastes lanei
Thamnodynastes longicaudus
Thamnodynastes marahuaquensis
Thamnodynastes pallidus
Thamnodynastes paraguanae
Thamnodynastes phoenix
Thamnodynastes ramonriveroi
Thamnodynastes rutilus
Thamnodynastes sertanejo
Thamnodynastes strigatus
Thamnodynastes yavi
Thamnophis
Thamnophis atratus
Thamnophis bogerti
Thamnophis brachystoma
Thamnophis butleri
Thamnophis chrysocephalus
Thamnophis conanti
Thamnophis couchii
Thamnophis cyrtopsis
Thamnophis elegans
Thamnophis eques
Thamnophis errans
Thamnophis exsul
Thamnophis fulvus
Thamnophis gigas
Thamnophis godmani
Thamnophis hammondii
Thamnophis lineri
Thamnophis marcianus
Thamnophis melanogaster
Thamnophis mendax
Thamnophis nigronuchalis
Thamnophis ordinoides
Thamnophis postremus
Thamnophis proximus
Thamnophis pulchrilatus
Thamnophis radix
Thamnophis rossmani
Thamnophis rufipunctatus
Thamnophis saurita
Thamnophis scalaris
Thamnophis scaliger
Thamnophis sirtalis
Thamnophis sumichrasti
Thamnophis unilabialis
Thamnophis validus
Thamnosophis
Thamnosophis epistibes
Thamnosophis infrasignatus
Thamnosophis lateralis
Thamnosophis martae
Thamnosophis mavotenda
Thamnosophis stumpffi
Thelotornis
Thelotornis capensis
Thelotornis kirtlandii
Thelotornis mossambicanus
Thelotornis usambaricus
Thermophis
Thermophis baileyi
Thermophis shangrila
Thermophis zhaoermii
Thrasops
Thrasops flavigularis
Thrasops jacksonii
Thrasops occidentalis
Thrasops schmidti
Tomodon
Tomodon dorsatus
Tomodon ocellatus
Tomodon orestes
Toxicocalamus
Toxicocalamus buergersi
Toxicocalamus cratermontanus
Toxicocalamus ernstmayri
Toxicocalamus grandis
Toxicocalamus holopelturus
Toxicocalamus longissimus
Toxicocalamus loriae
Toxicocalamus mintoni
Toxicocalamus misimae
Toxicocalamus nigrescens
Toxicocalamus pachysomus
Toxicocalamus preussi
Toxicocalamus spilolepidotus
Toxicocalamus stanleyanus
Toxicodryas
Toxicodryas blandingii
Toxicodryas pulverulenta
Trachischium
Trachischium fuscum
Trachischium guentheri
Trachischium laeve
Trachischium monticola
Trachischium sushantai
Trachischium tenuiceps
Trachyboa
Trachyboa boulengeri
Trachyboa gularis
Tretanorhinus
Tretanorhinus mocquardi
Tretanorhinus nigroluteus
Tretanorhinus taeniatus
Tretanorhinus variabilis
Tricheilostoma
Tricheilostoma bicolor
Tricheilostoma broadleyi
Tricheilostoma dissimilis
Tricheilostoma greenwelli
Tricheilostoma sundewalli
Trilepida
Trilepida affinis
Trilepida anthracina
Trilepida brasiliensis
Trilepida brevissima
Trilepida dimidiata
Trilepida dugandi
Trilepida fuliginosa
Trilepida guayaquilensis
Trilepida jani
Trilepida joshuai
Trilepida koppesi
Trilepida macrolepis
Trilepida nicefori
Trilepida pastusa
Trilepida salgueiroi
Trimeresurus
Trimeresurus albolabris
Trimeresurus andalasensis
Trimeresurus andersonii
Trimeresurus borneensis
Trimeresurus brongersmai
Trimeresurus cantori
Trimeresurus cardamomensis
Trimeresurus erythrurus
Trimeresurus fasciatus
Trimeresurus flavomaculatus
Trimeresurus gracilis
Trimeresurus gramineus
Trimeresurus gumprechti
Trimeresurus gunaleni
Trimeresurus hageni
Trimeresurus honsonensis
Trimeresurus insularis
Trimeresurus kanburiensis
Trimeresurus labialis
Trimeresurus macrolepis
Trimeresurus macrops
Trimeresurus malabaricus
Trimeresurus malcolmi
Trimeresurus mcgregori
Trimeresurus medoensis
Trimeresurus mutabilis
Trimeresurus nebularis
Trimeresurus phuketensis
Trimeresurus popeiorum
Trimeresurus puniceus
Trimeresurus purpureomaculatus
Trimeresurus rubeus
Trimeresurus sabahi
Trimeresurus schultzei
Trimeresurus septentrionalis
Trimeresurus sichuanensis
Trimeresurus stejnegeri
Trimeresurus strigatus
Trimeresurus sumatranus
Trimeresurus tibetanus
Trimeresurus trigonocephalus
Trimeresurus truongsonensis
Trimeresurus venustus
Trimeresurus vogeli
Trimeresurus wiroti
Trimeresurus yunnanensis
Trimetopon
Trimetopon barbouri
Trimetopon gracile
Trimetopon pliolepis
Trimetopon simile
Trimetopon slevini
Trimetopon viquezi
Trimorphodon
Trimorphodon biscutatus
Trimorphodon lambda
Trimorphodon lyrophanes
Trimorphodon paucimaculatus
Trimorphodon quadruplex
Trimorphodon tau
Trimorphodon vilkinsonii
Tropidechis
Tropidechis carinatus
Tropidoclonion
Tropidoclonion lineatum
Tropidodipsas
Tropidodipsas annulifera
Tropidodipsas fasciata
Tropidodipsas fischeri
Tropidodipsas philippii
Tropidodipsas repleta
Tropidodipsas sartorii
Tropidodipsas zweifeli
Tropidodryas
Tropidodryas serra
Tropidodryas striaticeps
Tropidolaemus
Tropidolaemus huttoni
Tropidolaemus laticinctus
Tropidolaemus philippensis
Tropidolaemus subannulatus
Tropidolaemus wagleri
Tropidonophis
Tropidonophis aenigmaticus
Tropidonophis dahlii
Tropidonophis dendrophiops
Tropidonophis dolasii
Tropidonophis doriae
Tropidonophis elongatus
Tropidonophis halmahericus
Tropidonophis hypomelas
Tropidonophis mairii
Tropidonophis mcdowelli
Tropidonophis montanus
Tropidonophis multiscutellatus
Tropidonophis negrosensis
Tropidonophis novaeguineae
Tropidonophis parkeri
Tropidonophis picturatus
Tropidonophis punctiventris
Tropidonophis statisticus
Tropidonophis truncatus
Tropidophis
Tropidophis battersbyi
Tropidophis bucculentus
Tropidophis canus
Tropidophis caymanensis
Tropidophis celiae
Tropidophis curtus
Tropidophis feicki
Tropidophis fuscus
Tropidophis galacelidus
Tropidophis grapiuna
Tropidophis greenwayi
Tropidophis haetianus
Tropidophis hardyi
Tropidophis hendersoni
Tropidophis jamaicensis
Tropidophis maculatus
Tropidophis melanurus
Tropidophis morenoi
Tropidophis nigriventris
Tropidophis pardalis
Tropidophis parkeri
Tropidophis paucisquamis
Tropidophis pilsbryi
Tropidophis preciosus
Tropidophis schwartzi
Tropidophis semicinctus
Tropidophis spiritus
Tropidophis stejnegeri
Tropidophis stullae
Tropidophis taczanowskyi
Tropidophis wrighti
Tropidophis xanthogaster
Typhlophis
Typhlophis squamosus
Typhlops
Typhlops agoralionis
Typhlops capitulatus
Typhlops eperopeus
Typhlops gonavensis
Typhlops hectus
Typhlops jamaicensis
Typhlops leptolepis
Typhlops lumbricalis
Typhlops oxyrhinus
Typhlops pachyrhinus
Typhlops proancylops
Typhlops pusillus
Typhlops rostellatus
Typhlops schwartzi
Typhlops silus
Typhlops sulcatus
Typhlops sylleptor
Typhlops syntherus
Typhlops tetrathyreus
Typhlops titanops
Ungaliophis
Ungaliophis continentalis
Ungaliophis panamensis
Uromacer
Uromacer catesbyi
Uromacer frenatus
Uromacer oxyrhynchus
Uromacerina
Uromacerina ricardinii
Uropeltis
Uropeltis arcticeps
Uropeltis beddomii
Uropeltis bhupathyi
Uropeltis bicatenata
Uropeltis broughami
Uropeltis ceylanica
Uropeltis dindigalensis
Uropeltis ellioti
Uropeltis grandis
Uropeltis liura
Uropeltis macrolepis
Uropeltis macrorhyncha
Uropeltis maculata
Uropeltis madurensis
Uropeltis myhendrae
Uropeltis nitida
Uropeltis ocellata
Uropeltis petersi
Uropeltis phipsonii
Uropeltis pulneyensis
Uropeltis rubrolineata
Uropeltis rubromaculata
Uropeltis shorttii
Uropeltis woodmasoni
Urotheca
Urotheca decipiens
Urotheca dumerilli
Urotheca fulviceps
Urotheca guentheri
Urotheca lateristriga
Urotheca multilineata
Urotheca myersi
Urotheca pachyura
Vermicella
Vermicella annulata
Vermicella intermedia
Vermicella multifasciata
Vermicella parscauda
Vermicella snelli
Vermicella vermiformis
Vipera
Vipera altaica
Vipera ammodytes
Vipera anatolica
Vipera aspis
Vipera barani
Vipera berus
Vipera darevskii
Vipera dinniki
Vipera eriwanensis
Vipera graeca
Vipera kaznakovi
Vipera latastei
Vipera lotievi
Vipera magnifica
Vipera monticola
Vipera olguni
Vipera orlovi
Vipera pontica
Vipera renardi
Vipera seoanei
Vipera shemakhensis
Vipera transcaucasiana
Vipera ursinii
Vipera walser
Virginia
Virginia valeriae
Wallaceophis
Wallaceophis gujaratensis
Walterinnesia
Walterinnesia aegyptia
Walterinnesia morgani
Xenelaphis
Xenelaphis ellipsifer
Xenelaphis hexagonotus
Xenocalamus
Xenocalamus bicolor
Xenocalamus mechowii
Xenocalamus michelli
Xenocalamus sabiensis
Xenocalamus transvaalensis
Xenochrophis
Xenochrophis asperrimus
Xenochrophis bellulus
Xenochrophis cerasogaster
Xenochrophis flavipunctatus
Xenochrophis maculatus
Xenochrophis melanzostus
Xenochrophis piscator
Xenochrophis punctulatus
Xenochrophis sanctijohannis
Xenochrophis schnurrenbergeri
Xenochrophis trianguligerus
Xenochrophis tytleri
Xenochrophis vittatus
Xenodermus
Xenodermus javanicus
Xenodon
Xenodon dorbignyi
Xenodon guentheri
Xenodon histricus
Xenodon matogrossensis
Xenodon merremii
Xenodon nattereri
Xenodon neuwiedii
Xenodon pulcher
Xenodon rabdocephalus
Xenodon semicinctus
Xenodon severus
Xenodon werneri
Xenopeltis
Xenopeltis hainanensis
Xenopeltis unicolor
Xenophidion
Xenophidion acanthognathus
Xenophidion schaeferi
Xenopholis
Xenopholis scalaris
Xenopholis undulatus
Xenopholis werdingorum
Xenotyphlops
Xenotyphlops grandidieri
Xerotyphlops
Xerotyphlops etheridgei
Xerotyphlops luristanicus
Xerotyphlops socotranus
Xerotyphlops vermicularis
Xerotyphlops wilsoni
Xyelodontophis
Xyelodontophis uluguruensis
Xylophis
Xylophis captaini
Xylophis perroteti
Xylophis stenorhynchus
Zamenis
Zamenis hohenackeri
Zamenis lineatus
Zamenis longissimus
Zamenis persicus
Zamenis scalaris
Zamenis situla
