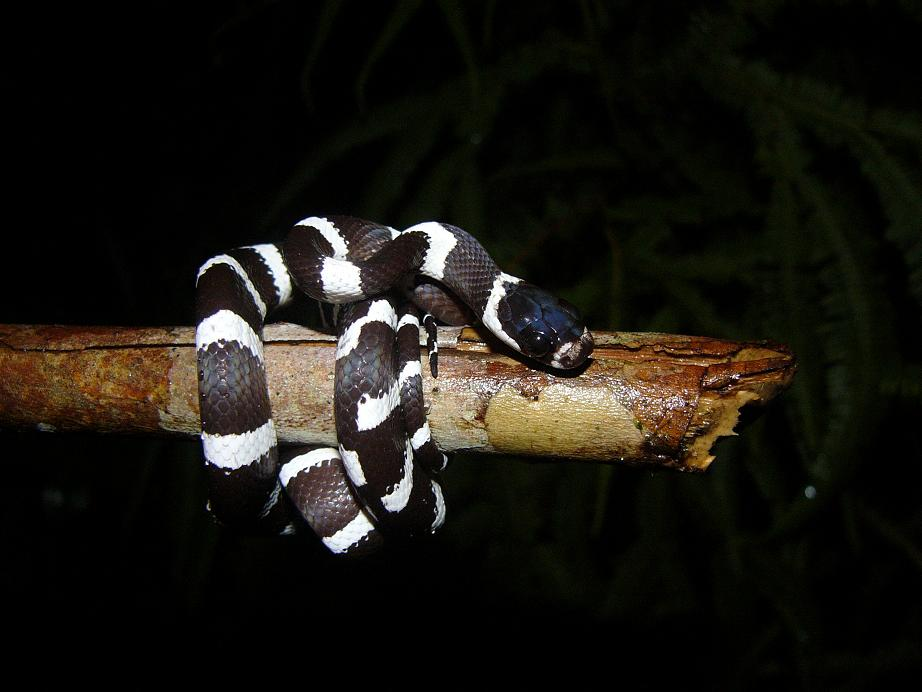

Scientific classification
- Domain: Eukaryota
- Kingdom: Animalia
- Phylum: Chordata
- Class: Reptilia
- Order: Squamata
- Suborder: Serpentes
- Family: Pseudoxyrhophiidae
- Genus: Parastenophis; Nagy, Glaw & Vences, 2010
- Species: P. betsileanus

Binomial name
- Parastenophis betsileanus (Günther, 1880)

= Parastenophis =

Genus of snakes

Parastenophis is a genus of snake in the family Pseudoxyrhophiidae that contains the sole species Parastenophis betsileanus.

It is found in Madagascar.
