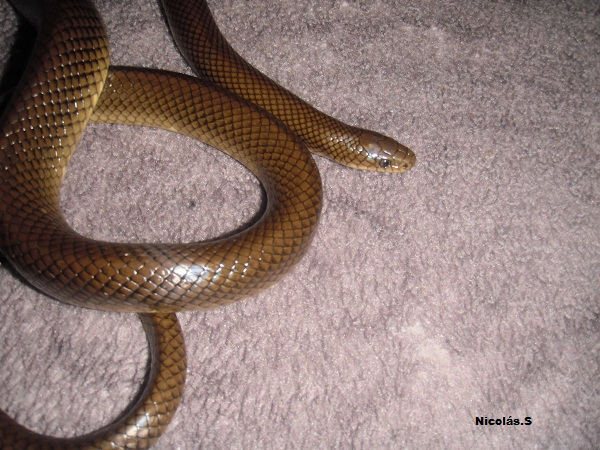

Conservation status
- Least Concern (IUCN 3.1)

Scientific classification
- Kingdom: Animalia
- Phylum: Chordata
- Class: Reptilia
- Order: Squamata
- Suborder: Serpentes
- Family: Colubridae
- Genus: Paraphimophis; Grazziotin, Zaher, Murphy, Scrocchi, Benavides, Zhang & Bonatto, 2012
- Species: P. rusticus

Binomial name
- Paraphimophis rusticus (Cope, 1878)

= Paraphimophis =

Genus of snakes

Paraphimophis is a genus of snake in the family Colubridae that contains the sole species Paraphimophis rusticus. It is commonly known as the Culebra.

It is endemic to South America, and can be found in Argentina, Brazil, and Uruguay.
