= Coronelaps =

Conservation status
- Least Concern (IUCN 3.1)

Scientific classification
- Kingdom: Animalia
- Phylum: Chordata
- Class: Reptilia
- Order: Squamata
- Suborder: Serpentes
- Family: Colubridae
- Genus: Coronelaps; Lema & Deiques, 2010
- Species: C. lepidus

Binomial name
- Coronelaps lepidus (Reinhardt, 1861)

Genus of snakes

Coronelaps is a genus of snake in the family Colubridae that contains the sole species Coronelaps lepidus. It is also known as the Minas Gerais snake or crowned burrowing snake.

It is endemic to Brazil.
