= Cyclotyphlops =

Conservation status
- Vulnerable (IUCN 3.1)

Scientific classification
- Kingdom: Animalia
- Phylum: Chordata
- Class: Reptilia
- Order: Squamata
- Suborder: Serpentes
- Family: Typhlopidae
- Subfamily: Asiatyphlopinae
- Genus: Cyclotyphlops; Bosch & Ineich, 1994
- Species: C. deharvengi

Binomial name
- Cyclotyphlops deharvengi Bosch & Ineich, 1994

Genus of snakes

Cyclotyphlops deharvengi, or Deharveng's blind snake, is a species of blind snake placed in the monotypic genus Cyclotyphlops. It is found in southeastern Sulawesi, Indonesia. No subspecies are currently recognized.

== Etymology ==
The specific name, deharvengi, is in honor of Louis Deharveng, who is an entomologist at the Muséum national d'histoire naturelle, Paris.

== Geographic range ==
C. deharvengi is known only from the type locality, which is "Malawa, between Maros and Bone-Watampon, Selatan Province, southeastern Sulawesi, Indonesia, at an elevation of about 500 m" (1,640 ft).

== Habitat ==
The preferred natural habitat of C. deharvengi is forest, at altitudes from sea level to 500 m (1,600 ft).

== Description ==
The genus Cyclotyphlops differs from all other genera in the subfamily Asiatyphlopinae by the arrangement of the head scales. There is a large central circular head shield, from which smaller scales radiate. C. deharvengi is dark brown dorsally, and brown ventrally. Maximum recorded total length (including tail) is 14.6 cm (5.7 in).

== Reproduction ==
C. deharvengi is oviparous.
