= Dotted brown snake =

Conservation status
- Least Concern (IUCN 3.1)

Scientific classification
- Kingdom: Animalia
- Phylum: Chordata
- Class: Reptilia
- Order: Squamata
- Suborder: Serpentes
- Family: Colubridae
- Genus: Sordellina; Proctor, 1923
- Species: S. punctata

Binomial name
- Sordellina punctata (Peters, 1880)

Synonyms
- Xenodon punctatus; Pseudoxyrhopus punctatus; Liophis rehi; Sordellina brandon-jonesii; Sordellina pauloensis

Species of snake

The dotted brown snake (Sordellina punctata) is a genus of the Colubridae family of snakes. It is monotypic in the genus Sordellina. It is endemic to Brazil. The snake is not considered to be venomous and is currently regarded as a species of least concern.
