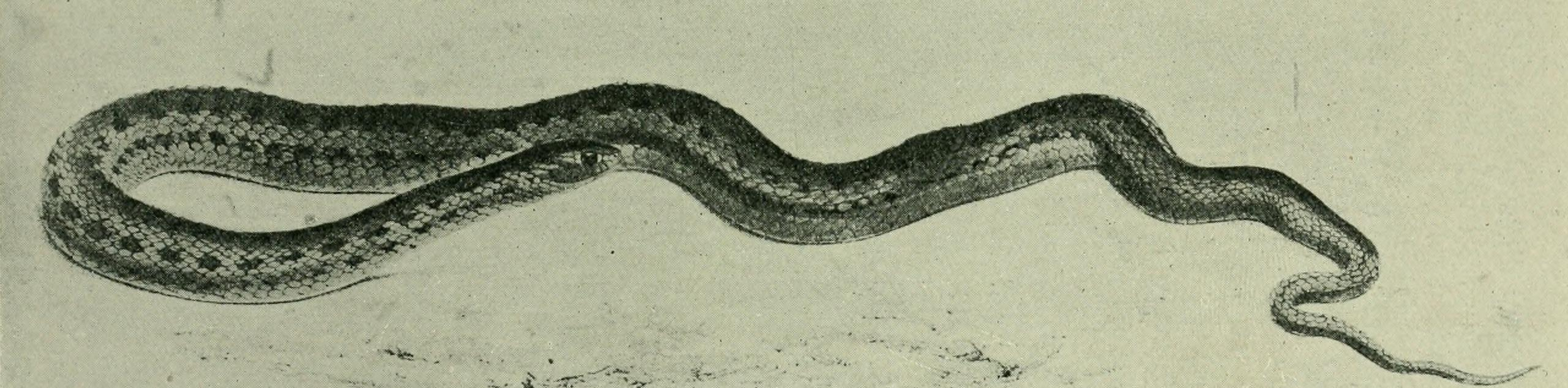

Scientific classification
- Kingdom: Animalia
- Phylum: Chordata
- Class: Reptilia
- Order: Squamata
- Suborder: Serpentes
- Family: Psammophiidae
- Genus: Dipsina; Jan, 1862
- Species: D. multimaculata

Binomial name
- Dipsina multimaculata (A. Smith, 1847)

Synonyms
- Coronella multimaculata A. Smith, 1847; Rhamphiophis multimaculatus – Sternfeld, 1910; Dipsina multimaculata – Branch, 1987

= Dwarf beaked snake =

Dipsina multimaculata

Species of snake

The dwarf beaked snake (Dipsina multimaculata), also called the western beaked snake, is a species of snake, which is endemic to southern Africa. It is in the monotypic genus Dipsina.

== Geographic range ==
It is found in southwestern Botswana, Namibia, and western and central South Africa.

== Description ==
Dipsina multimaculata is a small snake with a distinct, pointed snout. Adults may attain a total length of 40 cm (15.8 inches), including a 4.5-cm (1.8-in) tail.

It is pale buff or sandy gray dorsally, with three or five series of regular brown spots. The spots in the vertebral series are broader than long. A V-shaped brown mark is found on the back part of the head, with a diagonal brown streak from behind the eye towards the corner of the mouth. Ventrally, it is whitish.

The smooth dorsal scales are arranged in 17 rows. Ventrals number 155–168 in females, the anal plate is divided, and the subcaudals are divided (paired) into 31–40 in females.
