= Günther's racer =

Conservation status
- Least Concern (IUCN 3.1)

Scientific classification
- Kingdom: Animalia
- Phylum: Chordata
- Class: Reptilia
- Order: Squamata
- Suborder: Serpentes
- Family: Pseudoxyrhophiidae
- Subfamily: Amplorhininae
- Genus: Ditypophis; Günther, 1881
- Species: D. vivax

Binomial name
- Ditypophis vivax Günther, 1881

Species of snake

Günther's racer (Ditypophis vivax) is a snake in the family Pseudoxyrhophiidae.

It is found in Socotra.
