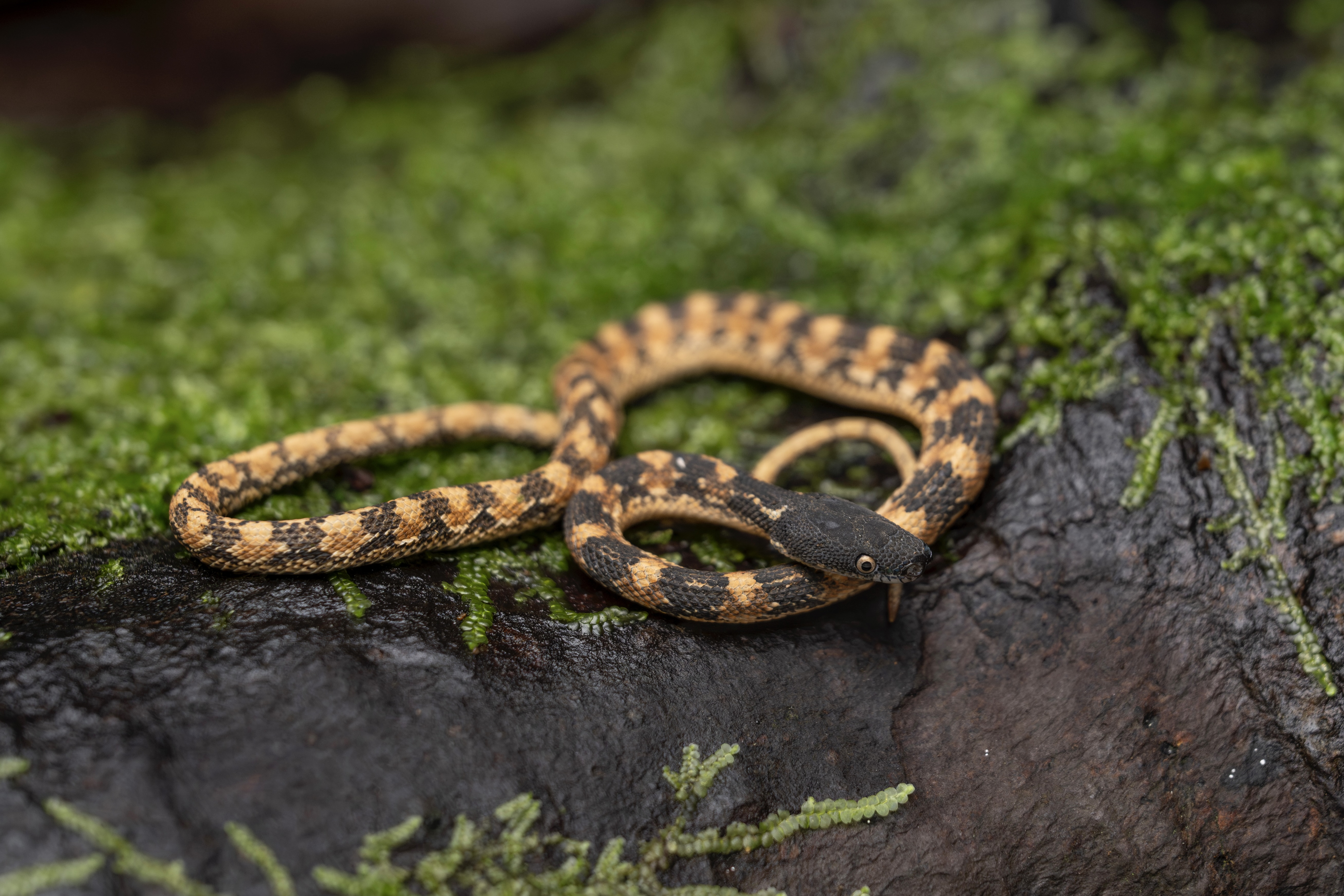

Conservation status
- Least Concern (IUCN 3.1)

Scientific classification
- Kingdom: Animalia
- Phylum: Chordata
- Class: Reptilia
- Order: Squamata
- Suborder: Serpentes
- Family: Colubridae
- Genus: Nothopsis; Cope, 1871
- Species: N. rugosus

Binomial name
- Nothopsis rugosus Cope, 1871

= Rough coffee snake =

Species of snake

The rough coffee snake (Nothopsis rugosus) is a monotypic snake found in Central America, western Colombia, and western Ecuador.
