= Anoplohydrus =

Anoplohydrus aemulans

Conservation status
- Data Deficient (IUCN 3.1)

Scientific classification
- Kingdom: Animalia
- Phylum: Chordata
- Class: Reptilia
- Order: Squamata
- Suborder: Serpentes
- Family: Colubridae
- Subfamily: Natricinae
- Genus: Anoplohydrus; F. Werner, 1909
- Species: A. aemulans

Binomial name
- Anoplohydrus aemulans F. Werner, 1909

Genus of snakes

Anoplohydrus is a genus of snake in the subfamily Natricinae of the family Colubridae. The genus contains the sole species Anoplohydrus aemulans, which is endemic to the island of Sumatra in Indonesia.
