= Ihering's snake =

Conservation status
- Data Deficient (IUCN 3.1)

Scientific classification
- Kingdom: Animalia
- Phylum: Chordata
- Class: Reptilia
- Order: Squamata
- Suborder: Serpentes
- Family: Colubridae
- Genus: Lioheterophis; Amaral, 1935
- Species: L. iheringi

Binomial name
- Lioheterophis iheringi Amaral, 1935

Species of snake

Ihering's snake (Lioheterophis iheringi) is a species of snake in the subfamily Dipsadinae of the family Colubridae. The species is endemic to Brazil. It is the only species in the monotypic genus Lioheterophis.

== Etymology ==
The specific name, iheringi, is in honor of German-Brazilian zoologist Rudolpho Teodoro Gaspar Wilhelm von Ihering.

== Geographic range ==
L. iheringi is found in northeastern Brazil, in the Brazilian state of Paraíba.

== Habitat ==
The preferred natural habitat of L. iheringi is shrubland.

== Description ==
L. iheringi is a small species of snake. The holotype, a female, has a total length of 36 cm (14 in), which includes a tail length of 6.5 cm (2.6 in). It has smooth dorsal scales without apical pits. There are 21 dorsal scale rows at midbody, the number of rows decreasing posteriorly. It has 151 ventrals, a divided anal plate, and 50 pairs of subcaudals.

== Behavior ==
L. iheringi is terrestrial.

== Reproduction ==
L. iheringi is oviparous.
