= Trimerodytes praemaxillaris =

Conservation status
- Least Concern (IUCN 3.1)

Scientific classification
- Kingdom: Animalia
- Phylum: Chordata
- Class: Reptilia
- Order: Squamata
- Suborder: Serpentes
- Family: Colubridae
- Genus: Trimerodytes
- Species: T. praemaxillaris

Binomial name
- Trimerodytes praemaxillaris Angel, 1929

Synonyms
- Paratapinophis praemaxillaris Angel, 1929; Opisthotropis praemaxillaris — Pope, 1935; Opisthotropis premaxillaris [sic] M.A. Smith, 1943 (ex errore); Opisthotrophis praemaxillaris — Chan-ard et al., 1999; Paratapinophis praemaxillaris — Murphy et al., 2008

Genus of snakes

Trimerodytes praemaxillaris is a species of snake in the subfamily Natricinae of the family Colubridae. It is also known commonly as Angel's mountain keelback, Angel's stream snake, and the brown stream snake. The species is endemic to Southeast Asia.

== Geographic range ==
T. praemaxillaris is found in China (Yunnan province), northern Laos, and Thailand.

== Habitat ==
The preferred natural habitats of T. praemaxillaris are forest and freshwater wetlands, at altitudes of 475–1,400 m (1,558–4,593 ft).

== Description ==
Dorsally, T. praemaxillaris is brown. Ventrally, it is dirty yellowish. The dorsal scales are smooth and are in 19 rows at midbody.

== Diet ==
T. praemaxillaris preys upon aquatic annelids.

== Reproduction ==
T. praemaxillaris is oviparous. The cotypes are hatchlings, each with an egg-tooth and a fresh umbilical scar. Each of these little snakes has a total length of 21.5 cm (8.5 in), which includes a tail 5 cm (2.0 in) long.
