= Schlegel's golden snake =

Conservation status
- Data Deficient (IUCN 3.1)

Scientific classification
- Kingdom: Animalia
- Phylum: Chordata
- Class: Reptilia
- Order: Squamata
- Suborder: Serpentes
- Family: Colubridae
- Subfamily: Dipsadinae
- Genus: Cercophis; Fitzinger, 1843
- Species: C. auratus

Binomial name
- Cercophis auratus (Schlegel, 1837)

Synonyms
- Dendrophis aurata

Genus of snakes

Cercophis is a genus of snake in the family Colubridae that contains the sole species Cercophis auratus. It is called Schlegel's golden snake.

It is found in Suriname and Brazil.
