= Alemán's snail-eater =

Conservation status
- Data Deficient (IUCN 3.1)

Scientific classification
- Kingdom: Animalia
- Phylum: Chordata
- Class: Reptilia
- Order: Squamata
- Suborder: Serpentes
- Family: Colubridae
- Genus: Plesiodipsas; Harvey, Rivas Fuenmayor, Caicedo Portilla, & Rueda-Almonacid, 2008
- Species: P. perijanensis

Binomial name
- Plesiodipsas perijanensis (Aleman, 1953)

Synonyms
- Tropidodipsas perijanensis; Dipsas perijanensis

Genus of snakes

Alemán's snail-eater (Plesiodipsas perijanensis) is a genus of snake in the family Colubridae.

It is found in the Serranía del Perijá of Zulia, Venezuela and Santander, Colombia.
