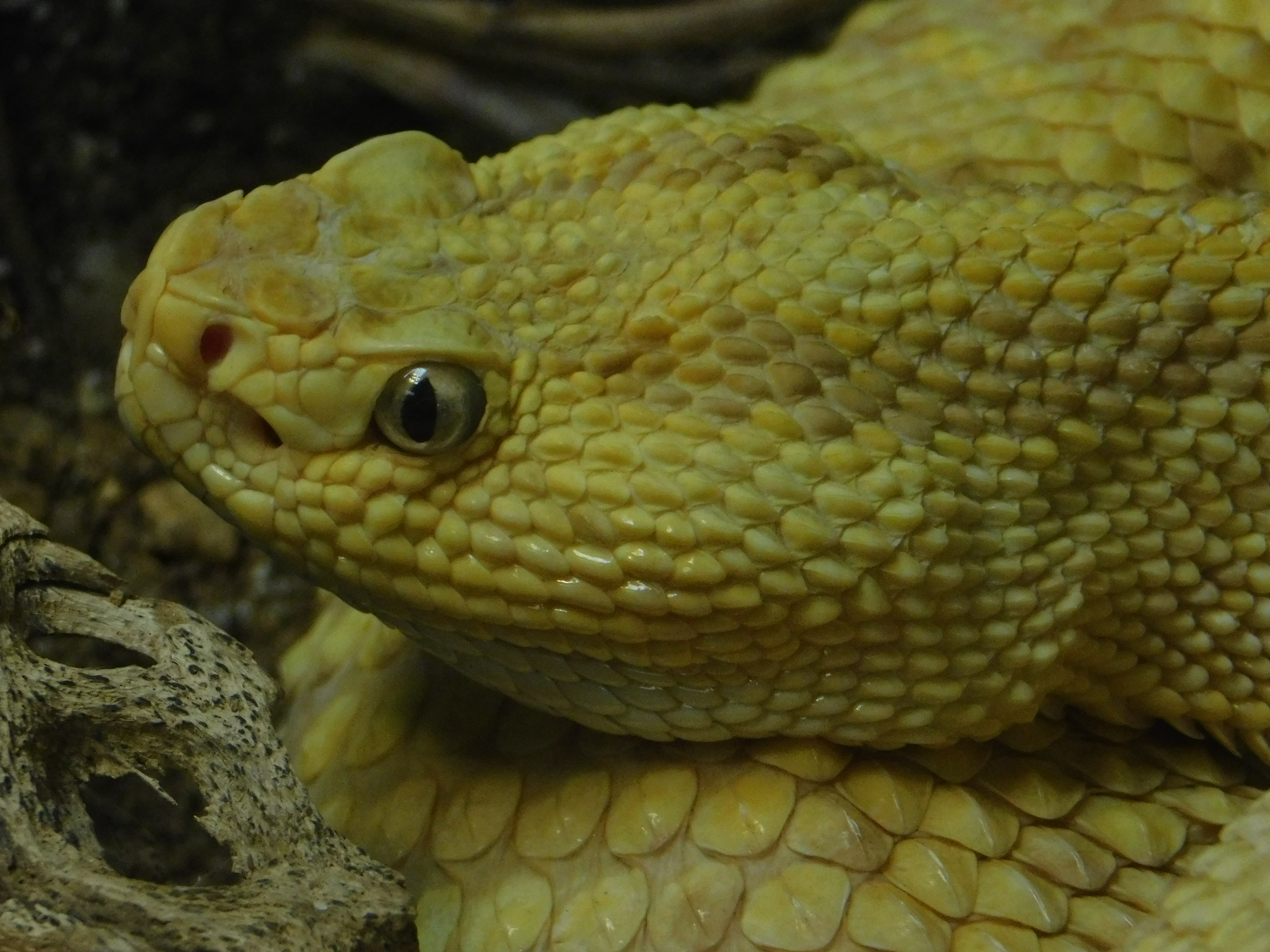

Scientific classification
- Kingdom: Animalia
- Phylum: Chordata
- Class: Reptilia
- Order: Squamata
- Suborder: Serpentes
- Family: Viperidae
- Genus: Crotalus
- Species: C. culminatus

Binomial name
- Crotalus culminatus Klauber, 1952

= Crotalus culminatus =

Species of snake

Crotalus culminatus, the Northwestern Neotropical rattlesnake, is a species of venomous snake in the genus Crotalus found in Mexico.

== Etymology ==
The specific name, culminatus, comes from the Latin words "culmen" (ridge) and "-atus" (provided with), referring to this snake's strong vertebral ridge.

== Description ==
The Northwestern Neotropical rattlesnake is a large species, with adults reaching lengths of 100 to 180 cm (approximately 39 to 71 inches). It has a heavy body with strongly keeled scales. The coloration is creamy yellow, becoming gray towards the tail, with diamond-shaped black markings on the back and longitudinal lines on the neck.

This species has a myotoxic-hemotoxic venom, which can cause hemorrhaging and induce localized paralysis via muscle damage. While it is less deadly to humans than some of its close relatives, it can still cause significant harm.

== Geographical range ==
Crotalus culminatus is found across much of southwestern Mexico, inhabiting a wide range of elevations from near sea level up to 2285 meters in the Sierra de Coalcomán. It can be found in arid environments, tropical scrub forests, savannas, and mesic forests, with rocky outcroppings being central to its habitat needs.

== Diet ==
This species is likely a generalist predator, with reported prey items including rodents, lizards, and small birds.
