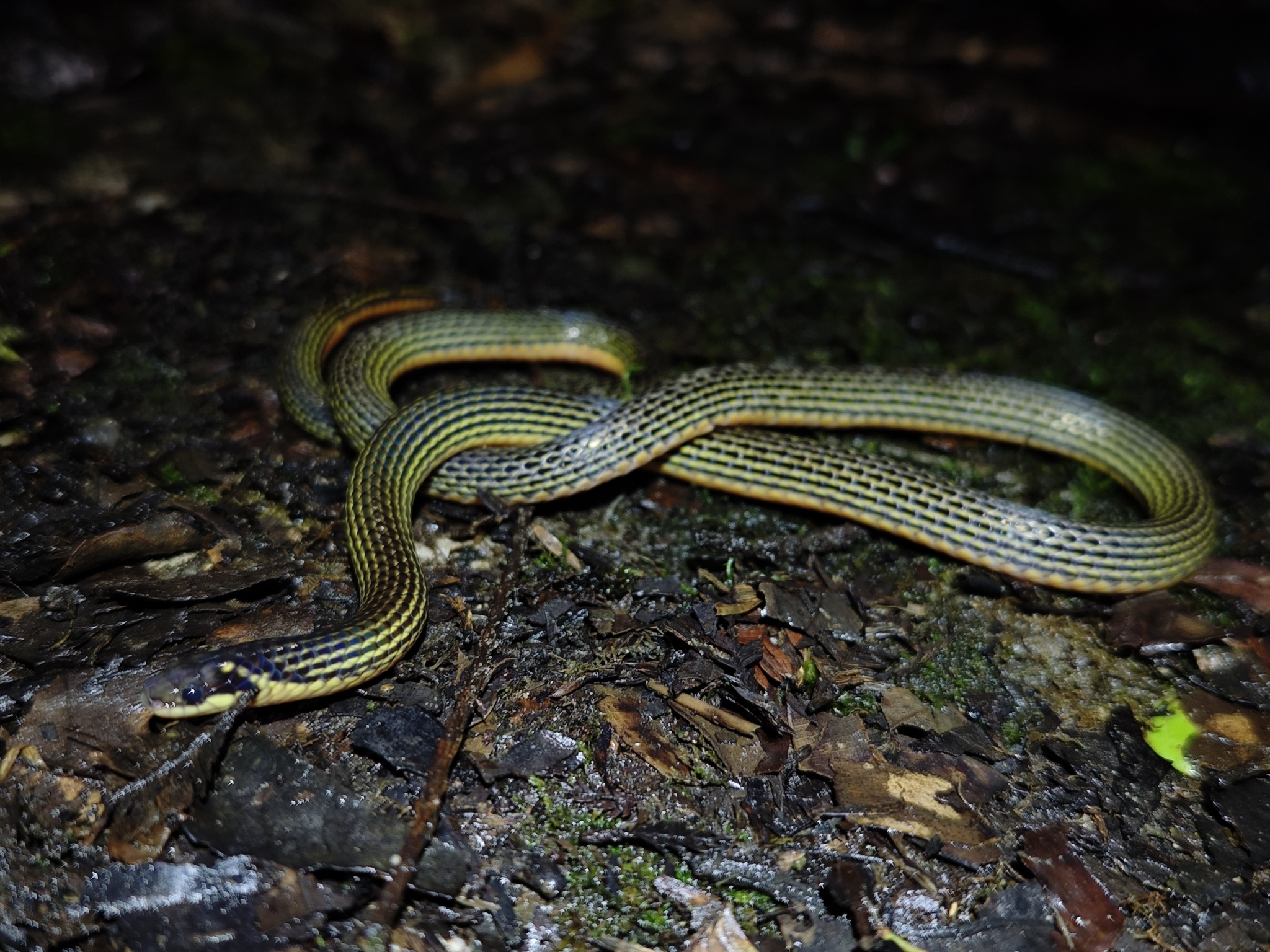

Conservation status
- Least Concern (IUCN 3.1)

Scientific classification
- Kingdom: Animalia
- Phylum: Chordata
- Class: Reptilia
- Order: Squamata
- Suborder: Serpentes
- Family: Colubridae
- Genus: Calamaria
- Species: C. griswoldi

Binomial name
- Calamaria griswoldi Loveridge, 1938
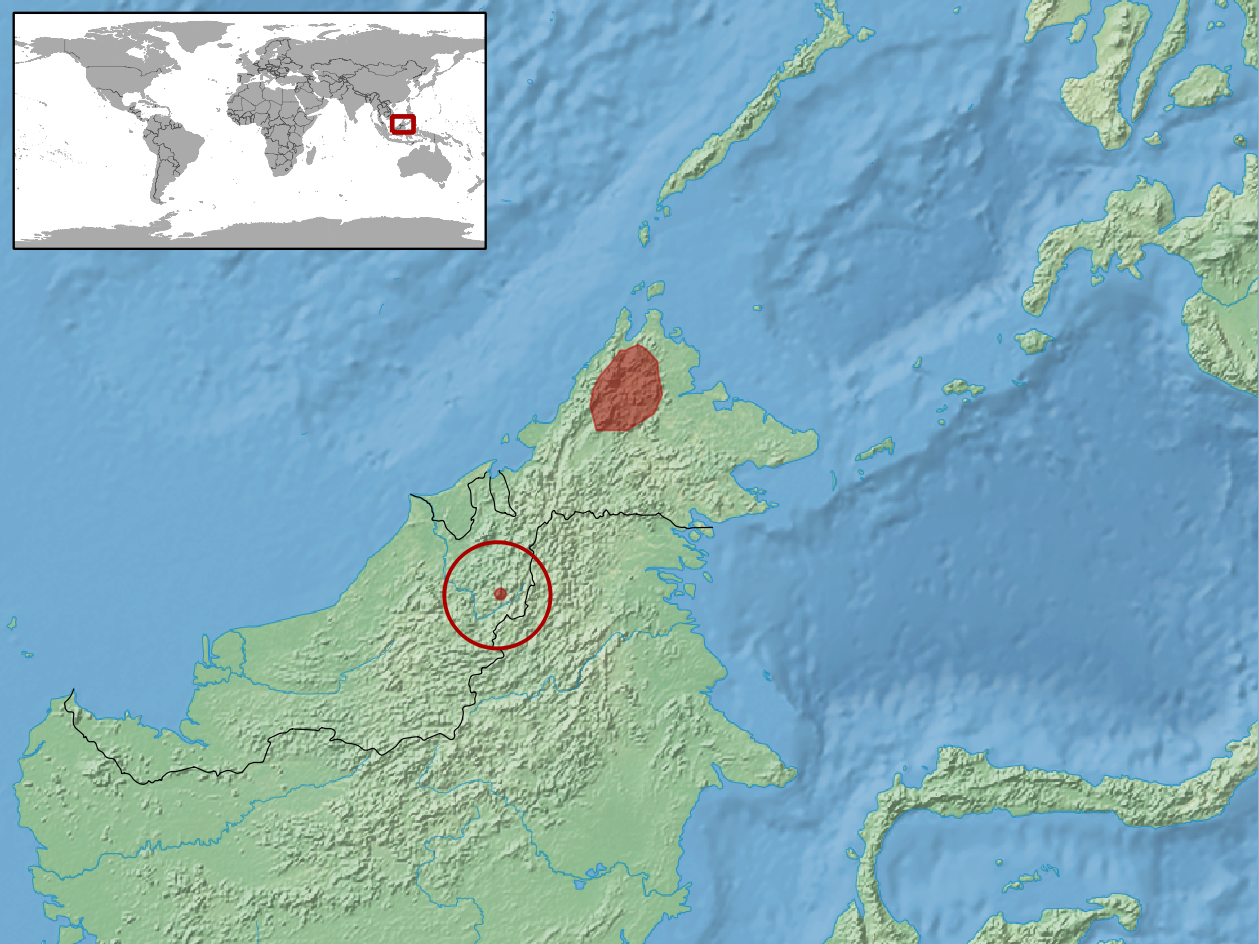

Synonyms
- Calamaria lumbricoidea griswoldi Loveridge, 1938; Calamaria griswoldi — Marx & Inger, 1955

= Calamaria griswoldi =

Species of snake

Calamaria griswoldi, also known commonly as the lined reed snake, is a species of snake in the subfamily Calamariinae of the family Colubridae. The species is native to Borneo.

== Etymology ==
The specific name, griswoldi, is in honor of American ornithologist John Augustus Griswold Jr. (1912–1991), who collected the holotype.

== Geographic distribution ==
Calamaria griswoldi is endemic to Borneo with records from Sabah and Sarawak (Malaysia).

== Habitat ==
The preferred natural habitat of Calamaria griswoldi is forest, at elevations of 1,000–1,500 m (3,300–4,900 ft).

== Description ==
Calamaria griswoldi is a small species. Maximum recorded total length (tail included) is 49 cm (19 in).

== Reproduction ==
Calamaria griswoldi is oviparous.
