= Schouteden's sun snake =

Conservation status
- Vulnerable (IUCN 3.1)

Scientific classification
- Kingdom: Animalia
- Phylum: Chordata
- Class: Reptilia
- Order: Squamata
- Suborder: Serpentes
- Family: Colubridae
- Subfamily: Natricinae
- Genus: Helophis de Witte & Laurent, 1942
- Species: H. schoutedeni

Binomial name
- Helophis schoutedeni (de Witte, 1942)

Synonyms
- Pelophis schoutedeni de Witte, 1942; Helophis schoutedeni — de Witte & Laurent, 1942

Species of snake

Schouteden's sun snake (Helophis schoutedeni) is a species of snake in the subfamily Natricinae of the family Colubridae. The species, which is monotypic in the genus Helophis, is endemic to Central Africa.

== Etymology ==
The specific name, schoutedeni, is in honor of Belgian zoologist Henri Schouteden.

== Geographic range ==
H. schoutedeni is found in the Democratic Republic of the Congo and Republic of the Congo.

== Description ==
The holotype of H. schoutedeni has a total length of 540 mm (21 in), which includes a tail 81 mm (3.2 in) long.
