= Spatula-toothed snake =

Conservation status
- Data Deficient (IUCN 3.1)

Scientific classification
- Kingdom: Animalia
- Phylum: Chordata
- Class: Reptilia
- Order: Squamata
- Suborder: Serpentes
- Family: Colubridae
- Genus: Iguanognathus; Boulenger, 1898
- Species: I. werneri

Binomial name
- Iguanognathus werneri Boulenger, 1898

Species of snake

The spatula-toothed snake (Iguanognathus werneri) is a species of snake in the family Colubridae. The species is endemic to Indonesia.

== Etymology ==
The specific name, werneri, is in honor of Austrian herpetologist Franz Werner.

== Taxonomy ==
The species I. werneri is monotypic within the genus Iguanognathus.

== Geographic range ==
I. werneri is known only from the holotype, which was collected in Sumatra, Indonesia.

== Habitat ==
The natural habitat of I. werneri is unknown.

== Description ==
All the teeth of I. werneri (mandibular, maxillary, and palatal) have spatulate crowns, which are ribbed along the outer side. The holotype, which is a female, has a total length of 35 cm (14 in), including a tail 8.7 cm (3.4 in) long.

== Reproduction ==
I. werneri is oviparous.
