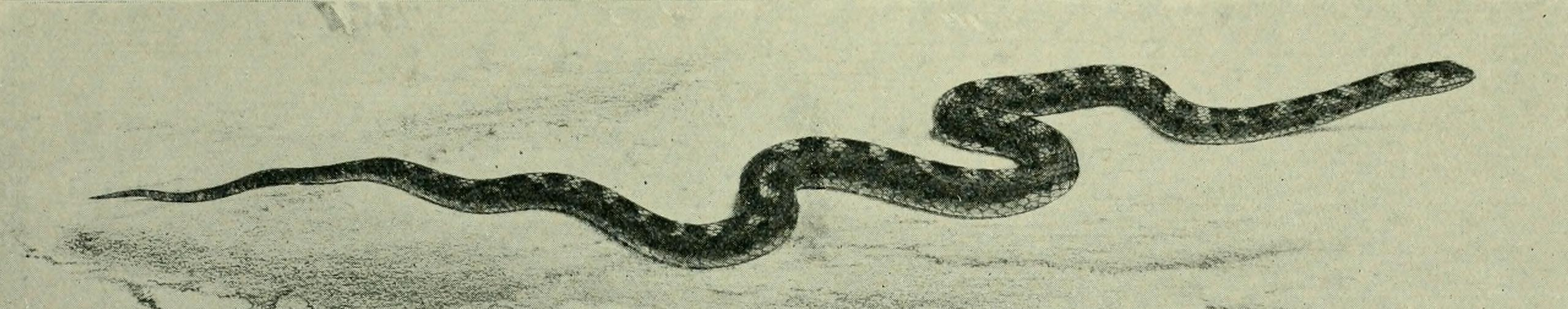

Conservation status
- Least Concern (IUCN 3.1)

Scientific classification
- Kingdom: Animalia
- Phylum: Chordata
- Class: Reptilia
- Order: Squamata
- Suborder: Serpentes
- Family: Pseudoxyrhophiidae
- Subfamily: Amplorhininae
- Genus: Amplorhinus; A. Smith, 1847
- Species: A. multimaculatus

Binomial name
- Amplorhinus multimaculatus A. Smith, 1847

Synonyms
- Amplorhinus multimaculatus A. Smith, 1947; Dipsas smithi — A.M.C. Duméril, Bibron & A.H.A. Duméril, 1854; Coronella multimaculatus — Günther, 1858; Psammophylax multimaculatus — Jan, 1863; Amplorhinus multimaculatus — Boulenger, 1896

= Amplorhinus =

Genus of snakes

Amplorhinus multimaculatus, commonly known as the many-spotted snake or the Cape reed snake, is a species of mildly venomous snake in the family Pseudoxyrhophiidae. The species, which is native to southern Africa, is monotypic (only one species in the genus) in the genus Amplorhinus.

== Geographic range ==
A. multimaculatus is found in Mozambique, South Africa, and Zimbabwe.

== Habitat ==
The preferred natural habitats of A. multimaculatus are freshwater wetlands, grassland, shrubland, and forest.

== Description ==
A small species, A. multimaculatus may attain a snout-to-vent length (SVL) of about 45 cm (18 in).

== Diet ==
A. multimaculatus preys on frogs and lizards.

== Reproduction ==
A. multimaculatus is viviparous. Usually four to eight young are born in late summer. Each neonate measures 12.5–20 cm (4.9–7.9 in) in total length (including tail).

== Venom ==
If a human is bitten by A. multimaculatus, the venom may cause localized swelling, inflammation, and pain. The venom is delivered by enlarged grooved teeth at the rear of the mouth.
