= Collorhabdium =

Conservation status
- Least Concern (IUCN 3.1)

Scientific classification
- Kingdom: Animalia
- Phylum: Chordata
- Class: Reptilia
- Order: Squamata
- Suborder: Serpentes
- Family: Colubridae
- Genus: Collorhabdium; Smedley, 1931
- Species: C. williamsoni

Binomial name
- Collorhabdium williamsoni Smedley, 1931

Genus of snakes

Collorhabdium is a genus of snake in the family Colubridae. The genus contains the sole species Collorhabdium williamsoni. It is commonly known as the mountain dwarf snake and Williamson's reed snake. It is endemic to Malaysia.

== Etymology ==
The specific name, williamsoni, is in honor of entomologist K.B. Williamson who collected the holotype.

== Geographic range ==
C. williamsoni is found in Peninsular Malaysia.

== Habitat ==
The preferred natural habitat of C. williamsoni is forest, at altitudes of 1,100–1,550 m (3,610–5,090 ft).

== Reproduction ==
C. williamsoni is oviparous.
