= Leiopython fredparkeri =

Conservation status
- Vulnerable (IUCN 3.1)

Scientific classification
- Kingdom: Animalia
- Phylum: Chordata
- Class: Reptilia
- Order: Squamata
- Suborder: Serpentes
- Family: Pythonidae
- Genus: Leiopython
- Species: L. fredparkeri

Binomial name
- Leiopython fredparkeri Schleip, 2008

Synonyms
- Leiopython hoserae Leiopython albertisii bennetti Leiopython bennettorum Bothrochilus hoserae Leiopython meridionalis Leiopython montanus Bothrochilus fredparkeri Bothrochilus bennettorum Bothrochilus montanus

Species of snake

Leiopython fredparkeri, also known commonly as the Karimui Basin whitelip python, the Karimui Basin white-lipped python, and the southern white-lipped python, is a species of snake in the family Pythonidae. The species is endemic to New Guinea. It was first described by German herpetologist Wulf D. Schleip in 2008.

== Etymology ==
The specific name, fredparkeri, is in honor of Australian naturalist Fred Parker (born 1941).

== Geographic range ==
L. fredparkeri is found in mainland Papua New Guinea.

== Habitat ==
The preferred natural habitat of L. fredparkeri is forest, at altitudes of 1,000–1,500 m (3,300–4,900 ft).
