= Amnesteophis =

Conservation status
- Data Deficient (IUCN 3.1)

Scientific classification
- Kingdom: Animalia
- Phylum: Chordata
- Class: Reptilia
- Order: Squamata
- Suborder: Serpentes
- Family: Colubridae
- Genus: Amnesteophis; Myers, 2011
- Species: A. melanauchen

Binomial name
- Amnesteophis melanauchen (Jan, 1863)

Synonyms
- Enicognathus melanauchen

Species of reptile

Amnesteophis is a genus of snakes in the family Colubridae that contains the sole species Amnesteophis melanauchen. It is found in Brazil.

This small snake species was first referenced about 140 years ago by locals in Bahia, Brazil. It is most similar to Adelphostigma occipitalis in size and features.
