= Platyceps vittacaudatus =

Conservation status
- Data Deficient (IUCN 3.1)

Scientific classification
- Kingdom: Animalia
- Phylum: Chordata
- Class: Reptilia
- Order: Squamata
- Suborder: Serpentes
- Family: Colubridae
- Genus: Platyceps
- Species: P. vittacaudatus

Binomial name
- Platyceps vittacaudatus (Blyth, 1854)

Synonyms
- Coluber vittacaudatus Blyth 1854; Coluber vittacaudatus, Das et al. 1998; Argyrogena vittacaudata, Wallach et al. 2014; Platyceps vittacaudatus — Deepak et al. 2021

Species of snake

The striped-tailed racer (Platyceps vittacaudatus) is a snake in the family Colubridae.

It is found in India.

== Distribution ==
India (Darjeeling, West Bengal)

Type locality: from "vicinity of Darjiling" (= Darjeeling, 27° 02'N; 88° 16'E; West Bengal State, eastern India). Known only from the type locality.
