= Amphiesmoides =

Conservation status
- Least Concern (IUCN 3.1)

Scientific classification
- Kingdom: Animalia
- Phylum: Chordata
- Class: Reptilia
- Order: Squamata
- Suborder: Serpentes
- Family: Colubridae
- Genus: Amphiesmoides; Malnate, 1961
- Species: A. ornaticeps

Binomial name
- Amphiesmoides ornaticeps (F. Werner, 1924)

Genus of snakes

Amphiesmoides is a genus of snake in the subfamily Natricinae of the family Colubridae. The genus contains the sole species Amphiesmoides ornaticeps. Commonly known as Werner's ornate snake or the white-eyed keelback, it is native to Southeast Asia.

== Geographic range ==
A. ornaticeps is found in China and Vietnam.
