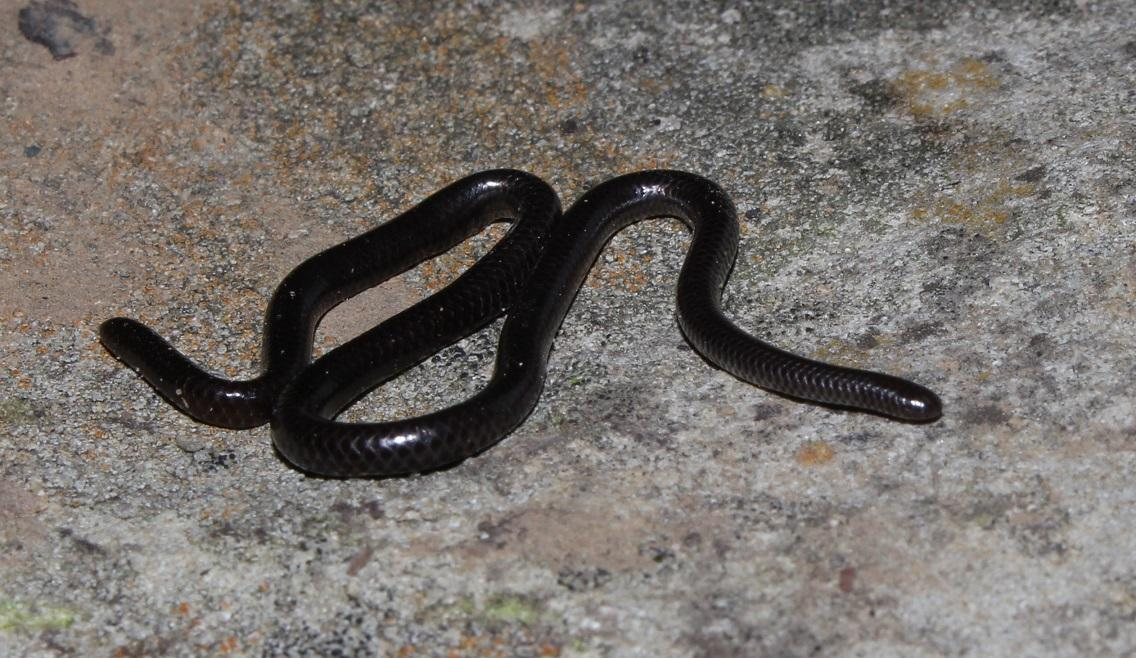
- Cape thread snake

Conservation status
- Least Concern (IUCN 3.1)

Scientific classification
- Kingdom: Animalia
- Phylum: Chordata
- Class: Reptilia
- Order: Squamata
- Suborder: Serpentes
- Family: Leptotyphlopidae
- Genus: Leptotyphlops
- Species: L. conjunctus

Binomial name
- Leptotyphlops conjunctus (Jan, 1861)
- Cape thread snake range (in green)

Synonyms
- Synonyms List: Stenostoma conjunctum Angel, 1861; Stenostoma groutii Cope 1875; Glauconia conjuncta Boulenger 1890; Glauconia conjuncta Boulenger 1893; Glauconia lepezi Boulenger 1901; Leptotyphlops conjunctus Loveridge 1933; Leptotyphlops conjunctus conjunctus Laurent 1956; Leptotyphlops conjunctus lepezi Laurent 1956; Leptotyphlops conjunctus lepezi Laurent 1958; Leptotyphlops conjunctus lepezi Trape & Roux-Estève 1995; Leptotyphlops lepezi Broadley 1998; Leptotyphlops scutifrons conjunctus Broadley 1998; Leptotyphlops conjunctus McDiarmid, Campbell & Toure 1999; Leptotyphlops scutifrons conjunctus Broadley & Wallach 2007; Leptotyphlops conjunctus Adalsteinsson, Branch, Trape, Vitt & Hedges 2009; Leptotyphlops conjunctus Wallach et al. 2014; Leptotyphlops scutifrons conjunctus Bates et al. 2014

= Leptotyphlops conjunctus =

Species of snake

The Cape thread snake (Leptotyphlops conjunctus) is a species of snake in the family Leptotyphlopidae. It has previously been considered a subspecies of Peter's thread snake, Leptotyphlops scutifrons. It was first described in 1861 as Stenostoma conjunctum.

== Gallery ==
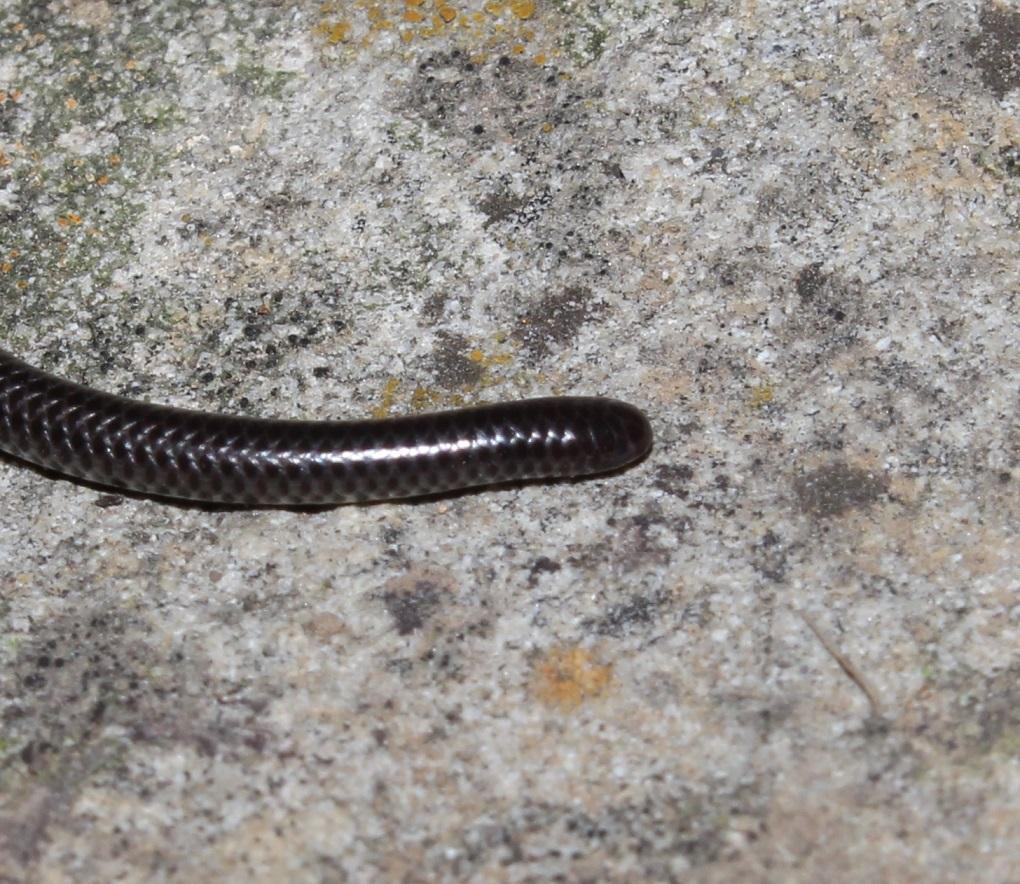
Close up photograph of L. conjunctus' head

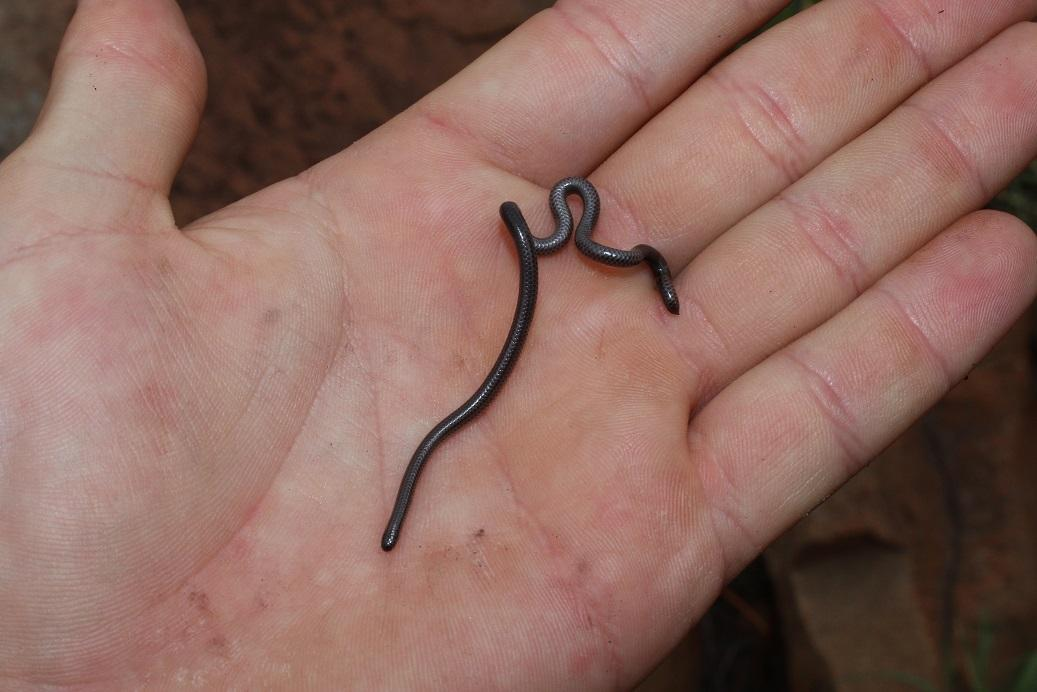
L. conjunctus in a hand, showing small size
