= St. Thomas beaked snake =

Conservation status
- Data Deficient (IUCN 3.1)

Scientific classification
- Kingdom: Animalia
- Phylum: Chordata
- Class: Reptilia
- Order: Squamata
- Suborder: Serpentes
- Family: Typhlopidae
- Genus: Letheobia
- Species: L. feae

Binomial name
- Letheobia feae (Boulenger, 1906)

Synonyms
- Typhlops feae Boulenger, 1906; Typhlops principis Boulenger, 1906; Rhinotyphlops feae — Roux-Estève, 1974; Letheobia feae — Broadley & Wallach, 2007

Species of snake

The St. Thomas beaked snake (Letheobia feae) is a species of snake in the family Typhlopidae. The species is native to the Gulf of Guinea off the western coast of Central Africa.

== Etymology ==
The specific name, feae, is in honor of Leonardo Fea, who was an Italian explorer and naturalist.

== Geographic range ==
L. feae is found on the island of São Tomé in the nation of São Tomé and Príncipe.

== Habitat ==
The preferred natural habitat of L. feae is forest, at altitudes of 200–300 m (660–980 ft), but it has also been found in agricultural areas.

== Behavior ==
L. feae is terrestrial and fossorial.

== Reproduction ==
L. feae is oviparous.
