= Zanzibar beaked snake =

Conservation status
- Data Deficient (IUCN 3.1)

Scientific classification
- Kingdom: Animalia
- Phylum: Chordata
- Class: Reptilia
- Order: Squamata
- Suborder: Serpentes
- Family: Typhlopidae
- Genus: Letheobia
- Species: L. pallida

Binomial name
- Letheobia pallida (Cope, 1869)

Synonyms
- Letheobia pallida Cope, 1869; Typhlops pallidus; Boulenger, 1893; Rhinotyphlops pallidus; Roux-Estève, 1974; Letheobia pallida - Broadley & Wallach, 2007

Species of snake

The Zanzibar beaked snake (Letheobia pallida) is a species of blind snake in the Typhlopidae family. It is endemic to Africa.
