= Letheobia newtoni =

Conservation status
- Data Deficient (IUCN 3.1)

Scientific classification
- Kingdom: Animalia
- Phylum: Chordata
- Class: Reptilia
- Order: Squamata
- Suborder: Serpentes
- Family: Typhlopidae
- Genus: Letheobia
- Species: L. newtoni

Binomial name
- Letheobia newtoni (Bocage, 1890)

Synonyms
- Typhlops (Onychocephalus) newtoni Bocage, 1890; Typhlops newtonii — Boulenger, 1893; Typhlops naveli Angel, 1920; Rhinotyphlops newtoni — Roux-Estève, 1974; Letheobia newtoni — Broadley & Wallach, 2007

Species of snake

Letheobia newtoni is a species of snake in the family Typhlopidae. The species is endemic to São Tomé and Príncipe.

== Etymology ==
The specific name, newtoni, is in honor of "M[onsieur]. F. Newton", who collected the type specimen on Ilhéu das Rolas in the Gulf of Guinea. "F. Newton" refers to Portuguese botanist Colonel Francesco Newton (1864–1909).

== Description ==
The holotype of Letheobia newtoni is 40 cm (16 in) in total length, which includes a tail 6 mm (0.24 in) long. The body is slender, the diameter not exceeding 8 mm (0.31 in). The scales are in 28 rows around the body. Dorsally and ventrally, it is uniformly yellowish white.

== Habitat ==
The preferred natural habitat of Letheobia newtoni is forest, at elevations of 10–1,000 m (33–3,281 ft).

== Behavior ==
Letheobia newtoni is terrestrial and fossorial.

== Reproduction ==
Letheobia newtoni is oviparous.
