= Letheobia kibarae =

Scientific classification
- Kingdom: Animalia
- Phylum: Chordata
- Class: Reptilia
- Order: Squamata
- Suborder: Serpentes
- Family: Typhlopidae
- Genus: Letheobia
- Species: L. kibarae

Binomial name
- Letheobia kibarae (de Witte, 1953)

Synonyms
- Typhlops kibarae de Witte, 1953; Rhinotyphlops kibarae – Roux-Estève, 1974; Letheobia kibarae – Broadley & Wallach, 2007

Species of snake

Letheobia kibarae, also known as the Upemba gracile blind snake or Katanga beaked snake, is a species of snakes in the family Typhlopidae. It is endemic to southern Democratic Republic of the Congo. Its type locality is in the Upemba National Park.
