= Letheobia rufescens =

Scientific classification
- Domain: Eukaryota
- Kingdom: Animalia
- Phylum: Chordata
- Class: Reptilia
- Order: Squamata
- Suborder: Serpentes
- Family: Typhlopidae
- Genus: Letheobia
- Species: L. rufescens

Binomial name
- Letheobia rufescens (Chabanaud, 1916)

Synonyms
- Typhlops rufescens Chabanaud, 1916; Rhinotyphlops rufescens – Roux-Estève, 1974; Letheobia rufescens – Broadley & Wallach, 2007

Species of snake

Letheobia rufescens, also known as the Oubangui gracile blind snake or Haut-Oubangui beaked snake, is a species of snake in the family Typhlopidae. It is endemic to Central Africa (Central African Republic and northern Democratic Republic of the Congo).
