= Melanoseps =

Scientific classification
- Kingdom: Animalia
- Phylum: Chordata
- Class: Reptilia
- Order: Squamata
- Family: Scincidae
- Subfamily: Scincinae
- Genus: Melanoseps; Boulenger, 1887

Genus of lizards

Melanoseps is a genus of lizards, known commonly as limbless skinks, in the family Scincidae. The genus is endemic to Sub-Saharan Africa.

== Species ==
The following eight species are recognized as being valid.

- Melanoseps ater (Günther, 1873) – black limbless skink.
- Melanoseps emmrichi Broadley, 2006 – Uluguru limbless skink.
- Melanoseps longicauda Tornier, 1900 – Pangani black limbless skink, longtail limbless skink
- Melanoseps loveridgei Brygoo & Roux-Estève, 1982 – Loveridge's limbless skink
- Melanoseps occidentalis (W. Peters, 1877) – western limbless skink
- Melanoseps pygmaeus Broadley, 2006 – pygmy limbless skink
- Melanoseps rondoensis Loveridge, 1942 – Rondo limbless skink
- Melanoseps uzungwensis Loveridge, 1942 – Udzungwa limbless skink

Nota bene: A binomial authority in parentheses indicates that the species was originally described in a genus other than Melanoseps.
