= Cross's beaked snake =

Conservation status
- Least Concern (IUCN 3.1)

Scientific classification
- Kingdom: Animalia
- Phylum: Chordata
- Class: Reptilia
- Order: Squamata
- Suborder: Serpentes
- Family: Typhlopidae
- Genus: Letheobia
- Species: L. crossii

Binomial name
- Letheobia crossii (Boulenger, 1893)

Synonyms
- Typhlops crossii Boulenger, 1893; Rhinotyphlops crossii — Roux-Estève, 1974; Letheobia crossii — Broadley & Wallach, 2007

Species of snake

Cross's beaked snake (Letheobia crossii) is a species of snake in the family Typhlopidae. The species is native to West Africa.

== Etymology ==
The specific name, crossii, is in honor of British explorer William Henry Crosse (1859–1903).

== Geographic range ==
L. crossii is found in Nigeria and Togo.

== Habitat ==
The preferred natural habitat of L. crossii is forest.

== Reproduction ==
L. crossii is oviparous.
