= Letheobia lumbriciformis =

Conservation status
- Least Concern (IUCN 3.1)

Scientific classification
- Kingdom: Animalia
- Phylum: Chordata
- Class: Reptilia
- Order: Squamata
- Suborder: Serpentes
- Family: Typhlopidae
- Genus: Letheobia
- Species: L. lumbriciformis

Binomial name
- Letheobia lumbriciformis (Peters, 1874)

Synonyms
- Onychocephalus (Letheobia) lumbriciformis Peters, 1874; Typhlops lumbriciformis – Boulenger, 1893; Typhlops kleebergi F. Werner, 1904; Rhinotyphlops lumbriciformis – Roux-Estève, 1974; Letheobia lumbriciformis – Broadley & Wallach, 2007

Species of snake

Letheobia lumbriciformis, also known as the Zanzibar gracile blind snake or wormlike beaked snake, is a species of snake in the Typhlopidae family. It is endemic to East Africa and is known from northeastern Tanzania (including Zanzibar) and from eastern Kenya.
