= Letheobia sudanensis =

Scientific classification
- Kingdom: Animalia
- Phylum: Chordata
- Class: Reptilia
- Order: Squamata
- Suborder: Serpentes
- Family: Typhlopidae
- Genus: Letheobia
- Species: L. sudanensis

Binomial name
- Letheobia sudanensis (Schmidt, 1923)

Synonyms
- Typhlops sudanensis Schmidt, 1923; Rhinotyphlops sudanensis; Roux-Estève, 1974; Letheobia sudanensis; Broadley & Wallach, 2007

Species of snake

Letheobia sudanensis, also known as the Garamba gracile blind snake or Sudan baked snake, is a species of snake in the Typhlopidae family. It is endemic to Africa.
