= Gabon beaked snake =

Scientific classification
- Kingdom: Animalia
- Phylum: Chordata
- Class: Reptilia
- Order: Squamata
- Suborder: Serpentes
- Family: Typhlopidae
- Genus: Letheobia
- Species: L. caeca

Binomial name
- Letheobia caeca (A.H.A. Duméril, 1856)

Synonyms
- Onychocephalus cæcus A.H.A. Duméril, 1856; Typhlops cæcus – Jan, 1864; Letheobia cæca – Cope, 1868; Typhlops acutirostratus Andersson, 1916; Typhlops avakubae – Schmidt, 1923; Typhlops caecus – de Witte, 1961; Rhinotyphlops caecus – Roux-Estève, 1974; McDiarmid et al., 1999; Letheobia acutirostratus – Wallach, 2005; Letheobia caecus – Broadley & Wallach, 2007

Species of snake

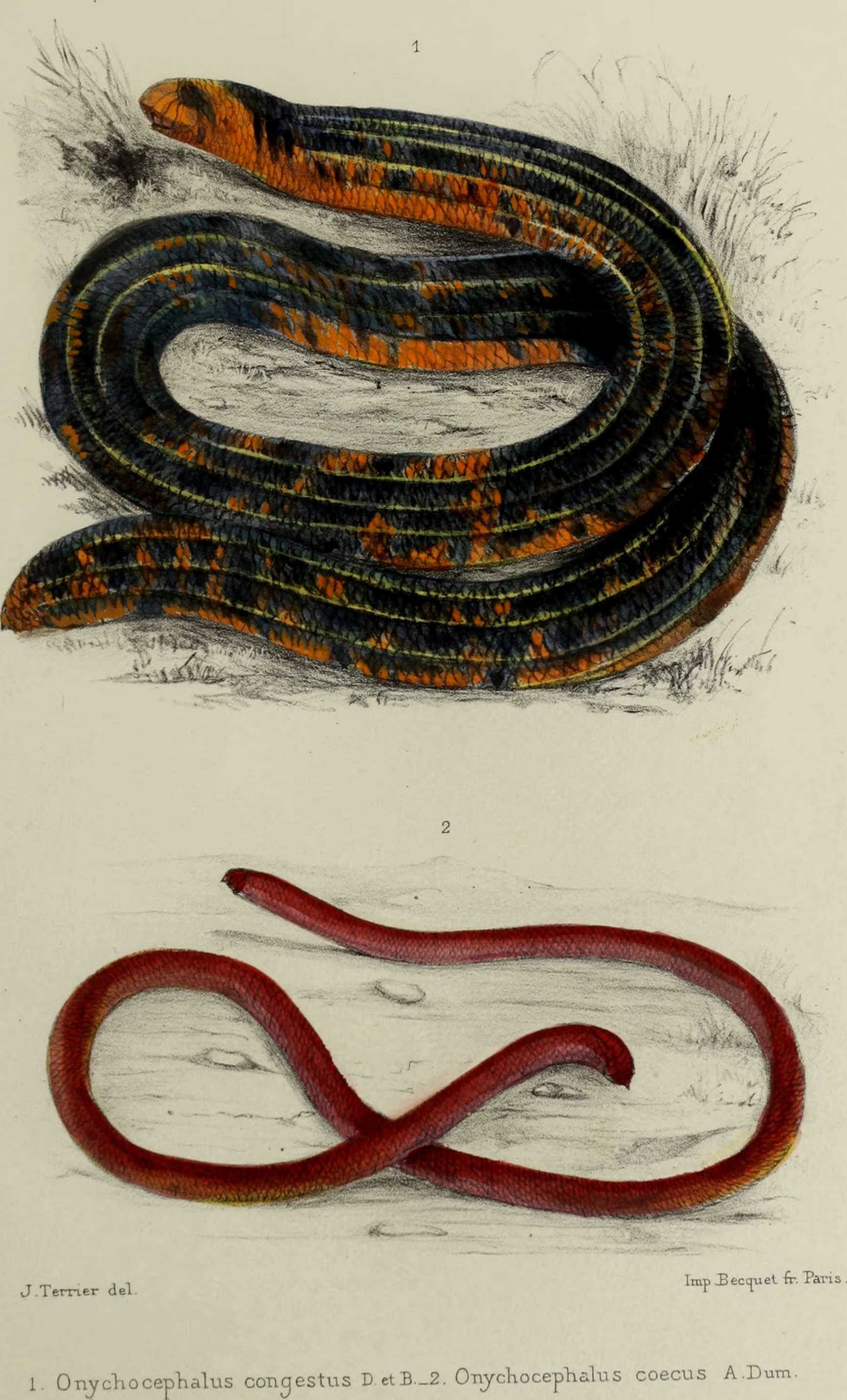
A gabon beaked snake (below) and a blotched blind snake (above)

The Gabon beaked snake (Letheobia caeca) is a species of blind snake in the family Typhlopidae. It is endemic to Sub-Saharan Africa. It is known from Gabon (its type locality), Cameroon, the Republic of the Congo, the Democratic Republic of the Congo, and Ghana. However, the identity of different populations is not fully clear.
