= Kitumbako =

Valley in the Uluguru Mountains, Tanzania

Kitumbako Swamps (Kitumbako/Kitumbaku or Kitundu Hills) is a small valley located near the Uluguru Mountains of Tanzania, and the site usually attracts paleoecological and archaeological investigations despite its inaccessibility to humans. Many scientific investigations done on this montane valley involve the assessment of biodiversity, fauna, sediments, vegetation, and fire activity to examine the possibility of human activity. Human activity, although not concrete, has been confirmed to be connected to this site as well as other montane grasslands in East Africa. However, the presence of humans in the past and present along with other environmental factors were explored to uncover current developments of the grasslands and gain a deeper understanding of their environmental resilience. Thus, much of the information that is gathered and published is from the results of off-site archaeology is paramount to understanding and learning about Kitumbako Swamps, especially since there is not enough information about excavations being executed on the site.

Particularly, a lot of the off-site archaeological information found on the Kitumbako Swamps is integrated into scientific studies based on the Uluguru Mountains or the general East African Mountains. Much of the research and studies done that were directly associated with the Kitumbako Swamps were conducted by paleoecologist Jemma Finch and paleoarchaeologist Rob Marchant. The research papers published by both experts were an effort to understand the Eastern Arc forest mechanisms and gain insight to the environment's stability. For instance, Finch and Marchant have collaborated on work to reconstruct the paleoecological record in the Eastern Arc Mountains. Pollen and charcoal analyses were mainly used to gauge the long-term changes in the montane landscape, but also to find any underlying evidence of human activity. Finch and Marchant found the Poaceae pollen to be dominant in the Kitumbako record for approximately 13,000 years [during the Holocene], indicating the stability of the environment. They also found that the charcoal content showed little to no change in fire frequency over the same period, but it remained moderately high. Radiocarbon and other stable isotopes analyses were also used to measure environmental changes in Kitumbako. However, Finch and Marchant's findings were significant because it indicated whether East African Mountains' grasslands were more likely to be naturally conserved rather than disturbed by the presence of human beings. This inclination to the natural conservation of the montane grasslands can most likely be explained by sites inaccessible to humans.

== Uluguru Mountains Deforestation and Farmland Effects on Forest Cover and Biodiversity ==
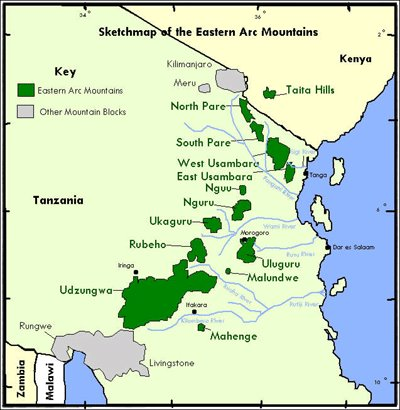
Sketch Map of the Eastern Arc Mountains - The Uluguru Mountains is depicted in this sketch, and gives a general idea of where Kitumbako Swamps is located.

The Eastern African Mountains have been a region to study paleoecological data only a total of three times. Scientists have an affinity to study this region because it is considered a biodiversity hotspot. In particular, the Uluguru Mountains Before 1999, it was recorded that the Uluguru Mountains were home to about 16 endemic vertebrate animals and about 135 endemic plants, but between 1999 and 2001 surveys were done and changed the status of many of these endemic species. In other words, some of these endemic species became lost in the record. Deforestation was speculated to be the cause behind the missing endemic species in the record because many of the species inhabited the natural forests of the Uluguru Mountains. Therefore, it would make sense that forest loss, especially when it goes beyond a certain threshold, could lead to the extinction of a species. The Luguru people were permanent settlers in the Uluguru Mountains and controlled were named responsible for the 60% loss of forest.

However, an alternative reason for the loss of endemic species is the conversion of forests into suitable farmland. Between the 1950s and the 1970s, farmland was in high demand in different areas across the Uluguru Mountains because the range of crops planted required different environments, and it found the region to be agriculturally productive. Some of the plants grew better in lower elevations whereas others grew better at cooler temperatures and higher altitudes. However, to blame the extinction of species endemic to the Uluguru Mountains solely on the transition of forests into farmland would be incorrect. As previously explained, farmland can alter a species habitat but it does not necessarily mean that it causes extinction for all species. It depends on the agricultural practices which will determine how drastically the environment will change, like with the two species T. uluguruensis and B. uluguruensis.

Human interference is attributed to the losses of forest, and it can be traced back to Kitumbako. Kitumbako/Kitundu Hills had a total loss of 20 km^{2} of forest and it could be attributed to the changes in political power in 1964.

== Paleoecological Investigations into Human Activity - Pollen and Charcoal Analyses ==
Paleoecological methods are used at Kitumbako because that is the most feasible way to understand the recent history of the Uluguru grasslands. These methods specifically track long-term changes in vegetation composition and fire regimes. Particularly, Finch and Marchant used these methods to investigate if the montane grasslands were secondary grasslands, which they defined it as a result of human activity. The most discussed methods involved pollen and charcoal analyses. Pollen analyses are typically used to measure and detect changes in vegetation composition and charcoal analyses are mainly used to investigate fire history.
