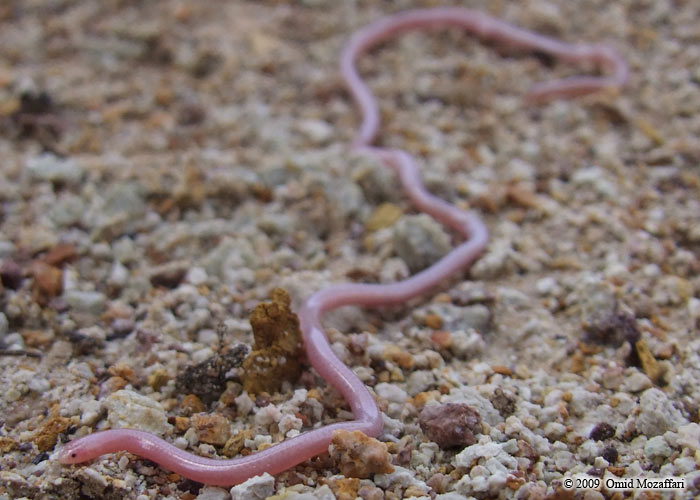

Scientific classification
- Kingdom: Animalia
- Phylum: Chordata
- Class: Reptilia
- Order: Squamata
- Suborder: Serpentes
- Family: Leptotyphlopidae
- Subfamily: Leptotyphlopinae
- Genus: Myriopholis; Hedges, Adalsteinsson & Branch, 2009

= Myriopholis =

Genus of snakes

Myriopholis is a genus of snakes in the family Leptotyphlopidae. Most of the species were previously placed in the genus Leptotyphlops.

== Species ==
The genus contains the following species:

- Myriopholis adleri (Hahn & Wallach, 1998) – Adler's worm snake
- Myriopholis albiventer (Hallermann & Rödel, 1995) – white-bellied worm snake
- Myriopholis algeriensis (Jacquet, 1896)
- Myriopholis blanfordi (Boulenger, 1890) – Sindh threadsnake, Blanford's worm snake
- Myriopholis boueti (Chabanaud, 1917) – Bouet's worm snake
- Myriopholis braccianii (Scortecci, 1929) – Scortecci's blind snake, Bracciani's worm snake
- Myriopholis burii (Boulenger, 1905) – Arabian blind snake, Bury's worm snake
- Myriopholis cairi (A.M.C. Duméril & Bibron, 1844) – Cairo blind snake
- Myriopholis erythraeus (Scortecci, 1929) – Eritrean worm snake
- Myriopholis filiformis (Boulenger, 1899) – Socotra Island blind snake
- Myriopholis ionidesi (Broadley & Wallach, 2007) – Ionides's worm snake
- Myriopholis lanzai Broadley, Wade & Wallach, 2014
- Myriopholis longicauda (W. Peters, 1854) – long-tailed threadsnake
- Myriopholis macrorhyncha (Jan, 1860) – hook-snouted worm snake, long-nosed worm snake
- Myriopholis macrura (Boulenger, 1899) – Boulenger's blind snake
- Myriopholis narirostris (W. Peters, 1867)
- Myriopholis nursii (Anderson, 1896) – Nurse's blind snake
- Myriopholis occipitalis J.-F. Trape & Chirio, 2019
- Myriopholis parkeri (Broadley, 1999) – Parker's worm snake
- Myriopholis perreti (Roux-Estève, 1979)
- Myriopholis rouxestevae (J.-F. Trape & Mané, 2004) – Roux-Estève's worm snake
- Myriopholis tanae (Broadley & Wallach, 2007) – Tana worm snake
- Myriopholis wilsoni (Hahn, 1978) – Wilson's blind snake
- Myriopholis yemenica (Scortecci, 1933) – Yemen blind snake

Nota bene: A binomial authority in parentheses indicates that the species was originally described in a genus other than Myriopholis.
