= Letheobia =

Scientific classification
- Kingdom: Animalia
- Phylum: Chordata
- Class: Reptilia
- Order: Squamata
- Suborder: Serpentes
- Family: Typhlopidae
- Subfamily: Afrotyphlopinae
- Genus: Letheobia; Cope, 1868

Genus of snakes

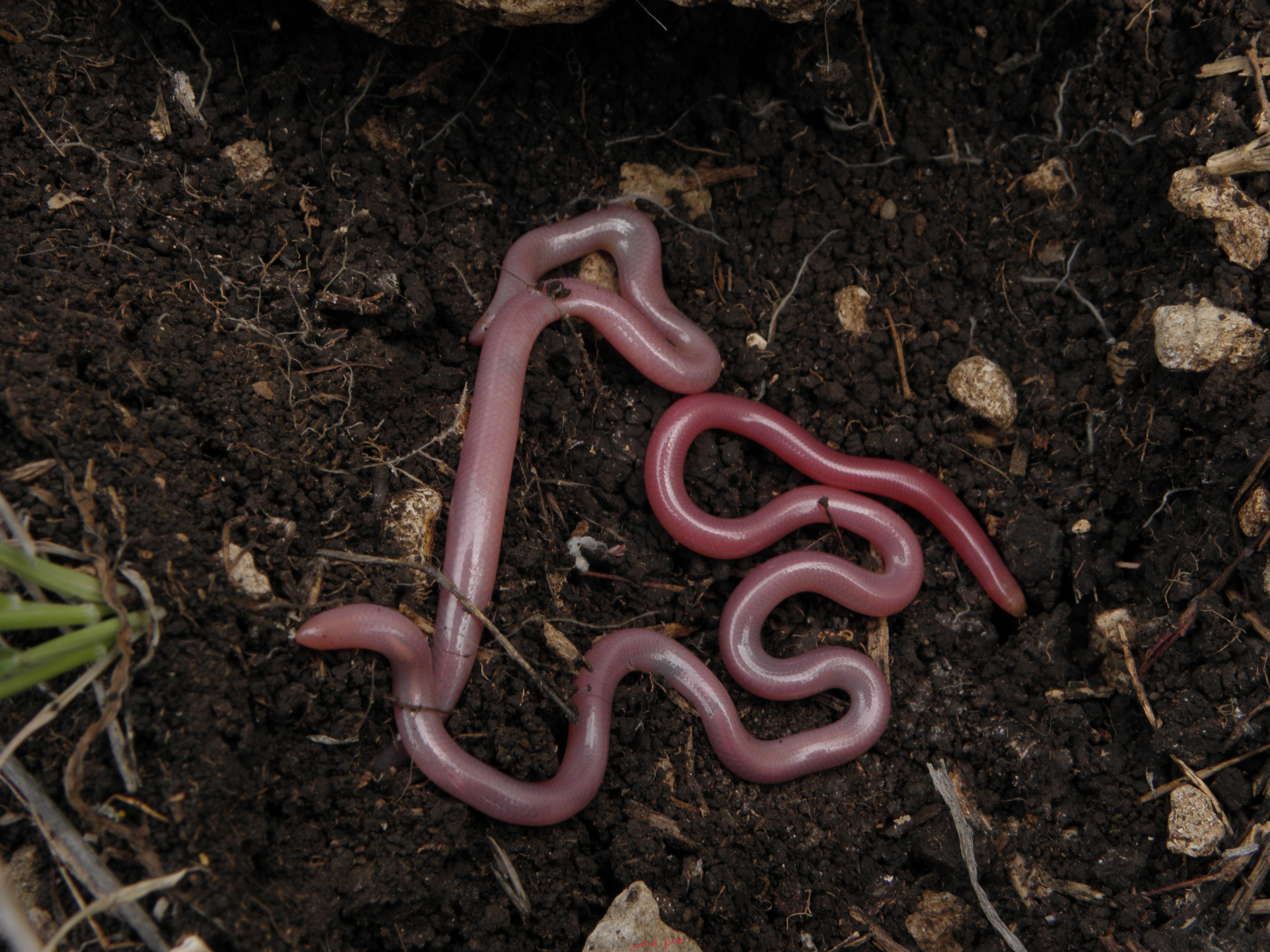
Letheobia Simoni

Letheobia is a genus of blind snakes in the family Typhlopidae.

== Geographic range ==
The genus Letheobia is endemic to Africa.

== Taxonomy ==
In 1869, the genus Letheobia was established by Edward Drinker Cope based primarily on two specimens of Letheobia pallida from Zanzibar, but later also including Letheobia caeca (originally Onychocephalus cæcus Duméril, 1856) from Gabon. Wilhelm Peters, in 1874 when describing Onychocephalus lumbriciformis from Zanzibar and in 1878 Typhlops unitaeniatus from Kenya, considered Letheobia to be a subgenus. Nonetheless, in 1881, Peters selected Letheobia caeca Duméril as the type species for the genus. In 1883, Boulenger decided that at best Letheobia was a subgenus of Typhlops, and placed it as a junior synonym. Later in reconstructing Rhinotyphlops in 1974, Roux-Estève moved all of Letheobia species into Rhinotyphlops, mostly into her Groups IV, V and VI. However, molecular studies in the 2000s showed that Rhinotyphlops, as conceived by Roux-Estève (1974), was polyphyletic, and that many if not all of Groups V and VI constituted a separate genus, for which the name Letheobia had priority. In 2007 Broadley and Wallach formally revived the genus Letheobia. In 2013, Pyron et al. considered with some certainty that Letheobia was a sister group to the combined genera Afrotyphlops and Megatyphlops, while the three were then sister to Rhinotyphlops, and the four were the sister to Typhlops.

== Species ==
The genus Letheobia contains the following 37 species which are recognized as being valid.

- Letheobia acutirostrata (Andersson, 1916)
- Letheobia akagerae Dehling, Hinkel, Ensikat, Babilon & E. Fischer, 2018
- Letheobia angeli (Guibé, 1952)
- Letheobia caeca (A.H.A. Duméril, 1856)
- Letheobia coecatus Jan, 1864
- Letheobia crossii (Boulenger, 1893)
- Letheobia debilis (Joger, 1990)
- Letheobia decorosus (Buchholz & W. Peters, 1875)
- Letheobia episcopus (Franzen & Wallach, 2002)
- Letheobia erythraea (Scortecci, 1928)
- Letheobia feae (Boulenger, 1906)
- Letheobia gracilis (Sternfeld, 1910)
- Letheobia graueri (Sternfeld, 1912)
- Letheobia jubana Broadley & Wallach, 2007
- Letheobia kibarae (de Witte, 1953)
- Letheobia largeni Broadley & Wallach, 2007
- Letheobia leucosticta (Boulenger, 1898)
- Letheobia lumbriciformis (W. Peters, 1874)
- Letheobia manni (Loveridge, 1941)
- Letheobia mbeerensis Malonza, Bauer & Ngwava, 2016
- Letheobia newtoni (Bocage, 1890)
- Letheobia pallida Cope, 1869
- Letheobia pauwelsi Wallach, 2005
- Letheobia pembana Broadley & Wallach, 2007
- Letheobia praeocularis (Stejneger, 1894)
- Letheobia rufescens (Chabanaud, 1916)
- Letheobia simonii (Boettger, 1879)
- Letheobia somalica (Boulenger, 1895)
- Letheobia stejnegeri (Loveridge, 1931)
- Letheobia sudanensis (Schmidt, 1923)
- Letheobia swahilica Broadley & Wallach, 2007
- Letheobia toritensis Broadley & Wallach, 2007
- Letheobia uluguruensis (Barbour & Loveridge, 1928)
- Letheobia weidholzi Wallach & Gemel, 2018
- Letheobia wittei (Roux-Estève, 1974)
- Letheobia wrayi Malonza, 2024
- Letheobia zenkeri Sternfeld, 1908

Nota bene: A binomial authority in parentheses indicates that the species was originally described in a genus other than Letheobia.

== Etymology ==
The specific name, pauwelsi, is in honor of Belgian herpetologist Olivier Sylvain Gérard Pauwels.
