= Scortecci's blind snake =

Conservation status
- Least Concern (IUCN 3.1)

Scientific classification
- Kingdom: Animalia
- Phylum: Chordata
- Class: Reptilia
- Order: Squamata
- Suborder: Serpentes
- Family: Leptotyphlopidae
- Genus: Myriopholis
- Species: M. braccianii

Binomial name
- Myriopholis braccianii (Scortecci, 1929)

Synonyms
- Glauconia braccianii Scortecci, 1929; Glauconia variabilis Scortecci, 1929; Glauconia fiechteri Scortecci, 1929; Leptotyphlops braccianii — Parker, 1949; Leptotyphlops macrorhynchus — Hahn, 1978; Leptotyphlops longicaudus — Hahn, 1979; Myriopholis braccianii — Adalsteinsson et al., 2009

Species of snake

Scortecci's blind snake (Myriopholis braccianii), also known commonly as Bracciani's worm snake, is a species of snake in the family Leptotyphlopidae. The species is endemic to the Horn of Africa.

== Etymology ==
The specific name, braccianii, is in honor of Italian explorer Luigi Bracciani.

== Geographic range ==
M. braccianii is found in Eritrea, Ethiopia, Kenya, Somalia, and Sudan.

== Habitat ==
The preferred natural habitats of M. braccianii are desert, grassland, shrubland, and savanna, at altitudes of 500–1,900 m (1,600–6,200 ft).

== Description ==
M . braccianii is a small species. The longest recorded specimen measures 14.4 cm (5.7 in) in total length (including tail).

== Reproduction ==
M. braccianii is oviparous.
