= Myriopholis rouxestevae =

Conservation status
- Least Concern (IUCN 3.1)

Scientific classification
- Kingdom: Animalia
- Phylum: Chordata
- Class: Reptilia
- Order: Squamata
- Suborder: Serpentes
- Family: Leptotyphlopidae
- Genus: Myriopholis
- Species: M. rouxestevae

Binomial name
- Myriopholis rouxestevae (Trape & Mane, 2004)

Synonyms
- Typhlops rouxestevae Trape & Mane, 2004; Leptotyphlops rouxestevae (Trape & Mane, 2004)

Species of snake

Myriopholis rouxestevae, also known as Roux-Estève's worm snake, is a species of snake in the family Leptotyphlopidae. It occurs in Sub-Saharan Africa.

== Etymology ==
The specific name, rouxestevae, is in honor of herpetologist Rolande Roux-Estève.

== Geographic range ==
Myriopholis rouxestevae is found in Senegal, Guinea, and Uganda. Records from Mali have been misattributed to this species.

== Habitat ==
Myriopholis rouxestevae is a fossorial species that has been found in agricultural areas.

== Reproduction ==
Myriopholis rouxestevae is oviparous.
