= Letheobia coecatus =

Scientific classification
- Domain: Eukaryota
- Kingdom: Animalia
- Phylum: Chordata
- Class: Reptilia
- Order: Squamata
- Suborder: Serpentes
- Family: Typhlopidae
- Genus: Letheobia
- Species: L. coecatus

Binomial name
- Letheobia coecatus Jan, 1863

Synonyms
- Typhlops caecatus; Letheobia coecata

Species of snake

The Ghana beaked blind snake (Letheobia coecatus) is a species of snake in the family Typhlopidae. It is endemic to West Africa and is known from Ghana, Ivory Coast, and Guinea.
