= Melanoseps uzungwensis =

Scientific classification
- Kingdom: Animalia
- Phylum: Chordata
- Class: Reptilia
- Order: Squamata
- Family: Scincidae
- Genus: Melanoseps
- Species: M. uzungwensis

Binomial name
- Melanoseps uzungwensis Loveridge, 1942

Species of skink

The Udzungwa limbless skink (Melanoseps uzungwensis) is an extant species of skink, a lizard in the family Scincidae. The species is found in Tanzania.
