= Emin Pasha's worm snake =

Conservation status
- Least Concern (IUCN 3.1)

Scientific classification
- Kingdom: Animalia
- Phylum: Chordata
- Class: Reptilia
- Order: Squamata
- Suborder: Serpentes
- Family: Leptotyphlopidae
- Genus: Leptotyphlops
- Species: L. emini

Binomial name
- Leptotyphlops emini (Boulenger, 1890)

Synonyms
- Glauconia emini Boulenger, 1890; Stenostoma emini — Tornier, 1896; Glauconia monticola Chabanaud, 1916; Leptotyphlops emini — Loveridge, 1933

Species of snake

Emin Pasha's worm snake (Leptotyphlops emini) is a species of snake in the family Leptotyphlopidae. The species is native to northern East Africa.

== Etymology ==
The specific name, emini, is in honor of German-born physician Eduard Schnitzer, who worked in the Ottoman Empire and became known as Emin Pasha.

== Geographic range ==
L. emini is found in Democratic Republic of Congo (formerly Zaire), Kenya, Sudan, Tanzania, Uganda, and Zambia.

== Habitat ==
The preferred natural habitats of L. emini are savanna and shrubland, at altitudes of 650–1,370 m (2,130–4,490 ft).

== Description ==
L. emini is uniformly blackish in color. It has 14 rows of scales around the body. Adults may attain a total length (including tail) of 11 cm (4.3 in).

== Behavior ==
L. emini is terrestrial and fossorial.

== Reproduction ==
L. emini is oviparous.
