= Letheobia gracilis =

Scientific classification
- Kingdom: Animalia
- Phylum: Chordata
- Class: Reptilia
- Order: Squamata
- Suborder: Serpentes
- Family: Typhlopidae
- Genus: Letheobia
- Species: L. gracilis

Binomial name
- Letheobia gracilis (Sternfeld, 1910)

Synonyms
- Typhlops gracilis Sternfeld, 1910; Rhinotyphlops gracilis – Roux-Estève, 1974; Letheobia gracilis – Broadley & Wallach, 2007

Species of snake

Letheobia gracilis, also known as the gracile blind snake or Urungu beaked snake, is a species of snake in the family Typhlopidae. It is endemic to Africa and is known from northern Zambia, western Tanzania, and southern Democratic Republic of the Congo.
