= Letheobia decorosus =

Scientific classification
- Domain: Eukaryota
- Kingdom: Animalia
- Phylum: Chordata
- Class: Reptilia
- Order: Squamata
- Suborder: Serpentes
- Family: Typhlopidae
- Genus: Letheobia
- Species: L. decorosus

Binomial name
- Letheobia decorosus Buchholz & Peters, 1875

Synonyms
- Typhlops buchholzi; Typhlops decorosusi; Afrotyphlops decorosus; Letheobia decorosa

Species of snake

Letheobia decorosus, also known as the Cameroon gracile blind snake or Cameroon worm snake, is a species of snake in the family Typhlopidae. It is found in Cameroon and the Central African Republic.
