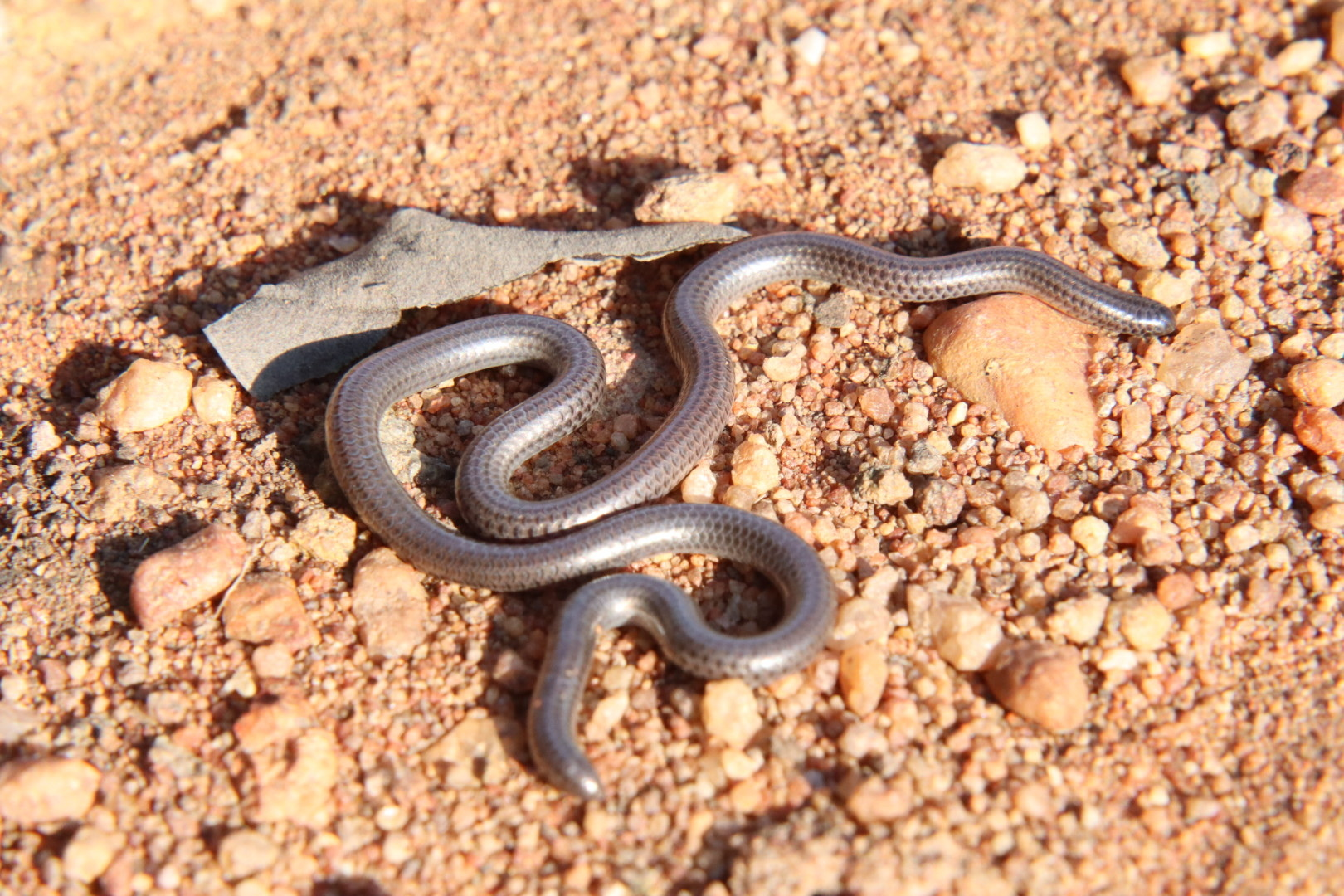
- Leptotyphlops distanti

Conservation status
- Least Concern (IUCN 3.1)

Scientific classification
- Kingdom: Animalia
- Phylum: Chordata
- Class: Reptilia
- Order: Squamata
- Suborder: Serpentes
- Family: Leptotyphlopidae
- Genus: Leptotyphlops
- Species: L. distanti

Binomial name
- Leptotyphlops distanti (Boulenger, 1892)
- Distant's thread snake range (in green)

Synonyms
- Glauconia distanti Boulenger, 1892; Leptotyphlops distanti — Parker, 1936; Leptotyphlops conjuncta distanti — Bogert, 1940; Leptotyphlops distanti — McDiarmid, Campbell & Touré, 1999

= Leptotyphlops distanti =

Species of snake

Leptotyphlops distanti, also known commonly as Distant's thread snake or Distant's worm snake, is a species of snake in the family Leptotyphlopidae. The species is native to Southern Africa.

== Etymology ==
The specific name, distanti, is in honor of English entomologist William Lucas Distant.

== Geographic range ==
L. distanti is found in Eswatini, southern Mozambique, and South Africa.

== Habitat ==
The preferred natural habitats of L. distanti are savanna and grassland, at altitudes of 250–1,600 m (820–5,250 ft).

== Description ==
Dorsally, L. distanti is gray-black. Ventrally, it is paler. Adults may attain a snout-vent length (SVL) of 22 cm (8.7 in).

== Reproduction ==
L. distanti is oviparous.

== Gallery ==
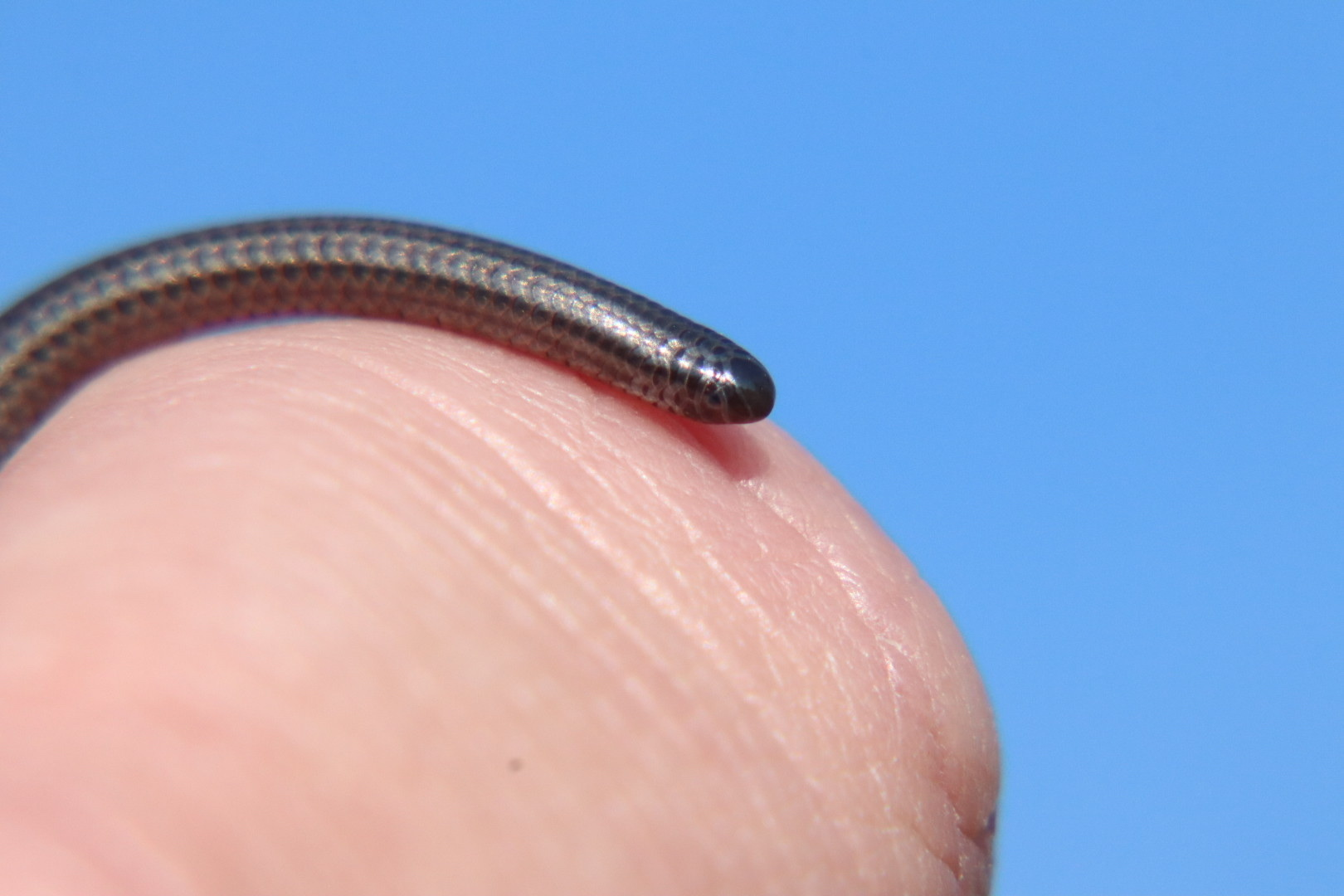
Close up shot of L. distanti
