= Feeble gracile blind snake =

Scientific classification
- Kingdom: Animalia
- Phylum: Chordata
- Class: Reptilia
- Order: Squamata
- Suborder: Serpentes
- Family: Typhlopidae
- Genus: Letheobia
- Species: L. debilis

Binomial name
- Letheobia debilis (Joger, 1990)

Synonyms
- Rhinotyphlops debilis - Broadley & Wallach, 2000

Species of snake

The feeble gracile blind snake (Letheobia debilis) is a species of snake in the Typhlopidae family. It is endemic to Africa.
