= Melanoseps occidentalis =

Scientific classification
- Kingdom: Animalia
- Phylum: Chordata
- Class: Reptilia
- Order: Squamata
- Family: Scincidae
- Genus: Melanoseps
- Species: M. occidentalis

Binomial name
- Melanoseps occidentalis (Peters, 1877)

Species of skink

The western limbless skink (Melanoseps occidentalis) is an extant species of skink, a lizard in the family Scincidae. The species is found in Cameroon, Equatorial Guinea, Gabon, Democratic Republic of the Congo, Angola, and Central African Republic.
