= Melanoseps ater =

Conservation status
- Least Concern (IUCN 3.1)

Scientific classification
- Kingdom: Animalia
- Phylum: Chordata
- Class: Reptilia
- Order: Squamata
- Family: Scincidae
- Genus: Melanoseps
- Species: M. ater

Binomial name
- Melanoseps ater (Günther, 1873)
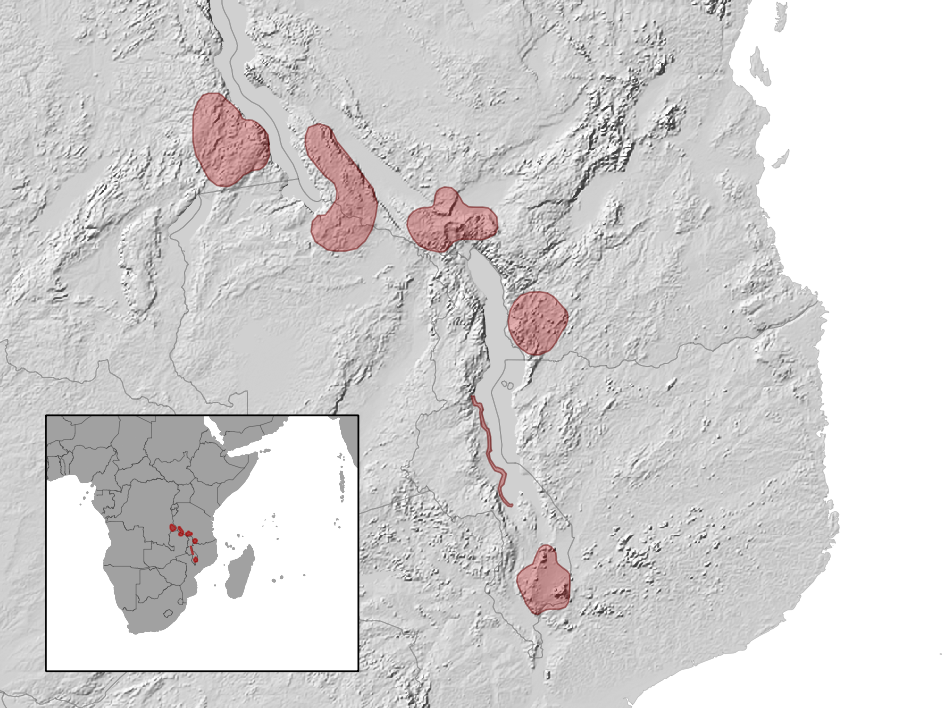

Species of reptile

The black limbless skink (Melanoseps ater) is an extant species of skink, a lizard in the family Scincidae. The species is found in Mozambique, Malawi, Zambia, Kenya, Tanzania, and Democratic Republic of the Congo.
