= Myriopholis perreti =

Conservation status
- Least Concern (IUCN 3.1)

Scientific classification
- Kingdom: Animalia
- Phylum: Chordata
- Class: Reptilia
- Order: Squamata
- Suborder: Serpentes
- Family: Leptotyphlopidae
- Genus: Myriopholis
- Species: M. perreti

Binomial name
- Myriopholis perreti (Roux-Estève, 1979)

Synonyms
- Leptotyphlops perreti Roux-Estève, 1979

Species of snake

Myriopholis perreti is a species of snake in the family Leptotyphlopidae. The species is native to western Central Africa.

== Etymology ==
The specific name, perreti, is in honor of Swiss herpetologist Jean-Luc Perret.

== Geographic distribution ==
Myriopholis perreti is found in Cameroon, Gabon, and Equatorial Guinea. It may also occur in the Republic of Congo.

== Habitat ==
The preferred natural habitats of Myriopholis perreti are lowland tropical moist forest and mixed savanna/forest mosaic, at elevations of 300–800 m (980–2,620 ft).

== Reproduction ==
Myriopholis perreti is oviparous.
