= Leptotyphlops telloi =

Conservation status
- Near Threatened (IUCN 3.1)

Scientific classification
- Kingdom: Animalia
- Phylum: Chordata
- Class: Reptilia
- Order: Squamata
- Suborder: Serpentes
- Family: Leptotyphlopidae
- Genus: Leptotyphlops
- Species: L. telloi

Binomial name
- Leptotyphlops telloi Broadley & Watson, 1976

Species of snake

Leptotyphlops telloi, also known commonly as Tello's threadsnake or Tello's worm snake, is a species of snake in the family Leptotyphlopidae. The species is indigenous to southern Africa.

== Etymology ==
The specific name, telloi, is in honor of Mozambican herpetologist José Luis Pessoa Lobão Tello.

== Geographic range ==
L. telloi is native to Mozambique and adjacent Eswatini.

== Description ==
A small species, L. telloi may grow to a maximum snout-vent length (SVL) of only 16.5 cm (6.5 in). It is solid black, except for white patches on the head.

== Habitat ==
The preferred habitat of L. telloi is thornveld.

== Reproduction ==
L. telloi is oviparous.
