= Letheobia somalica =

Scientific classification
- Domain: Eukaryota
- Kingdom: Animalia
- Phylum: Chordata
- Class: Reptilia
- Order: Squamata
- Suborder: Serpentes
- Family: Typhlopidae
- Genus: Letheobia
- Species: L. somalica

Binomial name
- Letheobia somalica (Boulenger, 1895)

Synonyms
- Typhlops somalicus Boulenger, 1895; Typhlops acutirostris Mocquard, 1905; Rhinotyphlops somalicus – Roux-Estève, 1974; Letheobia somalica – Broadley & Wallach, 2007

Species of snake

Letheobia somalica, also known as the highland beaked snake or Ethiopian blind snake, is a species of snake in the family Typhlopidae. It is endemic to Ethiopia.

== Geographic range ==
It appears to be endemic to Ethiopia.

== Description ==
Body pale olive; head yellowish. The type specimen is 45 cm (17 3/4 in) in total length. Scales arranged in 24 rows around the body.

Snout very prominent, obtusely pointed, with a sharp horizontal cutting edge, below which are located the nostrils. Head shields granulated. Rostral very large. Portion of rostral visible from above slightly longer than broad; portion visible from below as long as broad. Nasal completely divided, the nasal cleft proceeding from the second upper labial. Preocular nearly as large as the ocular, in contact with the second and third upper labials. Ocular in contact with the third and fourth upper labials. Eyes not distinguishable. Prefrontal and supraoculars transversely enlarged. Diameter of body 90 times in total length. Tail slightly broader than long, ending in a small spine.
