= Stejneger's beaked snake =

Conservation status
- Least Concern (IUCN 3.1)

Scientific classification
- Kingdom: Animalia
- Phylum: Chordata
- Class: Reptilia
- Order: Squamata
- Suborder: Serpentes
- Family: Typhlopidae
- Genus: Letheobia
- Species: L. stejnegeri

Binomial name
- Letheobia stejnegeri (Loveridge, 1931)

Synonyms
- Typhlops stejnegeri Loveridge, 1931; Typhlops vanderysti de Witte, 1933; Rhinotyphlops stejnegeri — McDiarmid, Campbell & Touré, 1999; Letheobia stejnegeri — Broadley & Wallach, 2007

Species of snake

Stejneger's beaked snake (Letheobia stejnegeri) is a species of snake in the family Typhlopidae. The species is native to Middle Africa.

== Etymology ==
The specific name, stejnegeri, is in honor of Leonhard Stejneger, Norwegian-born American herpetologist at the Smithsonian Institution for over 60 years.

== Geographic range ==
L. stejnegeri is found in the Democratic Republic of the Congo and in the Republic of the Congo.

== Habitat ==
The preferred natural habitat of L. stejnegeri is forest.

== Reproduction ==
L. stejnegeri is oviparous.
