= Melanoseps pygmaeus =

Scientific classification
- Kingdom: Animalia
- Phylum: Chordata
- Class: Reptilia
- Order: Squamata
- Family: Scincidae
- Genus: Melanoseps
- Species: M. pygmaeus

Binomial name
- Melanoseps pygmaeus Broadley, 2006

Species of skink

The pygmy limbless skink (Melanoseps pygmaeus) is an extant species of skink, a lizard in the family Scincidae. The species is found in Tanzania.
