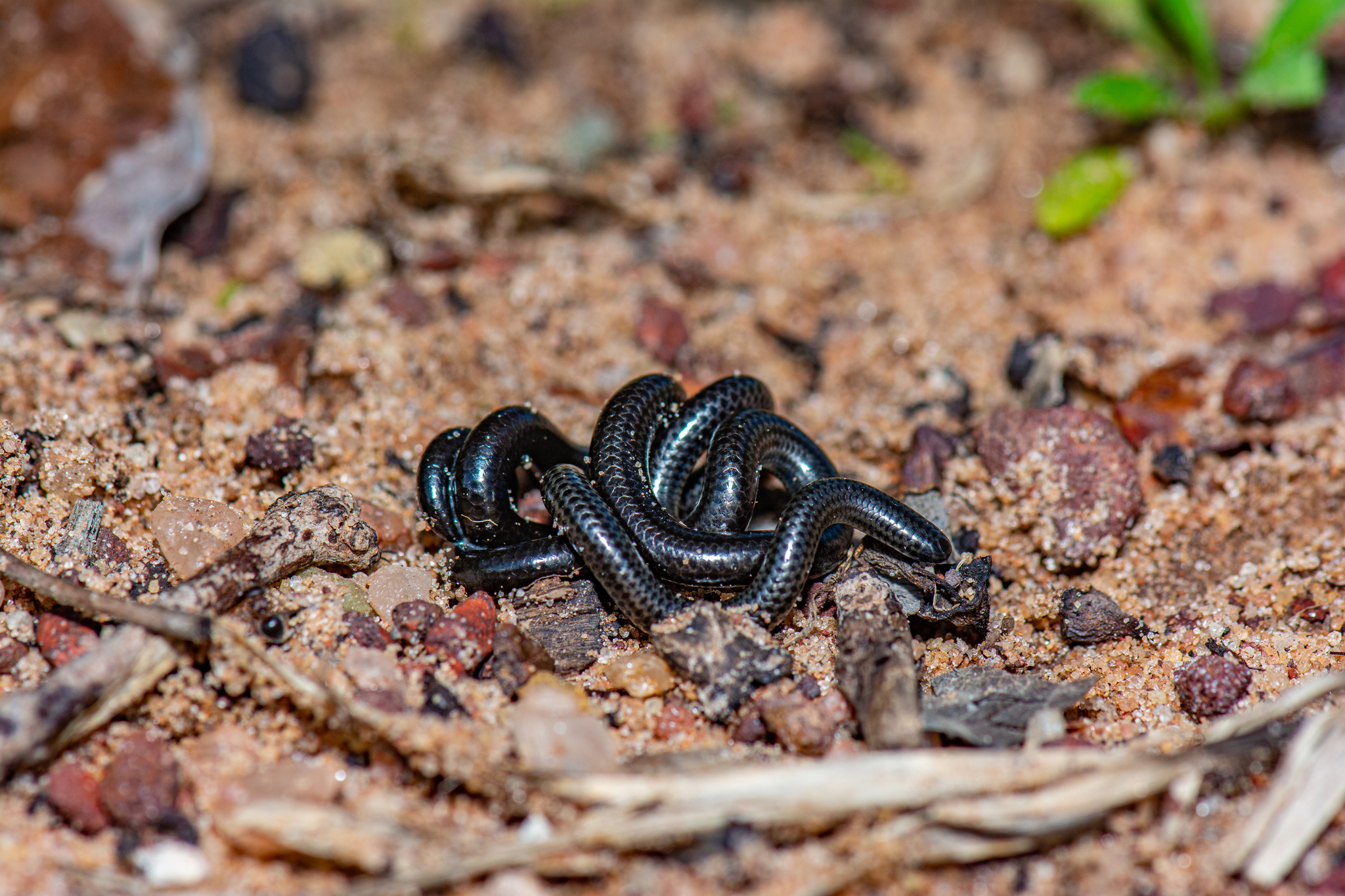
- Leptotyphlops macrops

Conservation status
- Least Concern (IUCN 3.1)

Scientific classification
- Kingdom: Animalia
- Phylum: Chordata
- Class: Reptilia
- Order: Squamata
- Suborder: Serpentes
- Family: Leptotyphlopidae
- Genus: Leptotyphlops
- Species: L. macrops

Binomial name
- Leptotyphlops macrops Broadley & Wallach, 1996
- Goggle-eyed worm snake range (in green)

Synonyms
- Synonyms List: Glauconia emini Sternfeld, 1908; Glauconia longicauda Angel, 1925; Leptotyphlops conjunctus conjunctus Spawls, 1978; Leptotyphlops nigricans Hallermann & Rödel, 1995; Leptotyphlops macrops Broadley & Wallach, 1996; Leptotyphlops macrops McDiarmid, Campbell & Touré, 1999; Leptotyphlops macrops Broadley & Wallach, 2007; Leptotyphlops macrops Adalsteinsson, Branch, Trape, Vitt & Hedges, 2009; Leptotyphlops macrops Wallach, et al. 2014; Leptotyphlops macrops Spawls, et al. 2018

= Goggle-eyed worm snake =

Species of snake

The goggle-eyed worm snake (Leptotyphlops macrops) is a species of snakes in the family Leptotyphlopidae. It lives entirely on the coast of southern Kenya and northern Tanzania in East Africa. It lives in savanna, forest, and artificial/terrestrial habitats. Its population is fragmented, their populations have extreme fluctuations, and are in decline. It was assessed on January 26, 2014 as conservation status Least Concern.
