= Melanoseps loveridgei =

Conservation status
- Least Concern (IUCN 3.1)

Scientific classification
- Kingdom: Animalia
- Phylum: Chordata
- Class: Reptilia
- Order: Squamata
- Family: Scincidae
- Genus: Melanoseps
- Species: M. loveridgei

Binomial name
- Melanoseps loveridgei Brygoo & Roux-Estève, 1982

Species of skink

Melanoseps loveridgei, also known commonly as Loveridge's limbless skink, is a species of lizard in the subfamily Scincinae of the family Scincidae. The species is native to East Africa.

== Description ==
Relatively large for its genus, Melanoseps loveridgei may attain a total length (tail included) of 16 cm (6.3 in). The tail length is about 25% of the total length. There are 18 scale rows around the body at midbody. Coloration is gray or black dorsally and lighter ventrally.

== Geographic range ==
Melanoseps loveridgei is found in Democratic Republic of the Congo, Malawi, Mozambique, Tanzania, and Zambia.

== Habitat ==
The preferred natural habitats of Melanoseps loveridgei are forest and savanna.

== Behavior ==
Melanoseps loveridgei is terrestrial and fossorial.

== Reproduction ==
The mode of reproduction of Melanoseps loveridgei has been variously described as being viviparous and as being ovoviviparous.

== Etymology ==
The specific name, loveridgei, is in honor of British herpetologist Arthur Loveridge.
