= Bouet's worm snake =

Conservation status
- Least Concern (IUCN 3.1)

Scientific classification
- Kingdom: Animalia
- Phylum: Chordata
- Class: Reptilia
- Order: Squamata
- Suborder: Serpentes
- Family: Leptotyphlopidae
- Genus: Myriopholis
- Species: M. boueti

Binomial name
- Myriopholis boueti (Chabanaud, 1917)

Synonyms
- Glauconia boueti Chabanaud, 1917; Glauconia debilis Chabanaud, 1918; Leptotyphlops narirostris boueti — Villiers, 1950; Leptotyphlops debilis — Hahn, 1980; Leptotyphlops boueti — J.-F. Trape & Mané, 2000; Myriopholis boueti — Adalsteinsson et al., 2009

Species of snake

Bouet's worm snake (Myriopholis boueti) is a species of snake in the family Leptotyphlopidae. The species is native to West Africa.

== Etymology ==
The specific name, boueti, is in honor of Georges Bouet (1869–1957), who was a French ornithologist and physician.

== Geographic range ==
M. boueti is found in Burkina Faso, Chad, The Gambia, Ghana, Guinea, Guinea-Bissau, Ivory Coast, Liberia, Mali, Niger, Nigeria, Senegal, Sierra Leone, Togo, and Western Sahara.

== Habitat ==
The preferred natural habitat of M. boueti is savanna.

== Description ==
The holotype of M. boueti has a total length of 16.6 cm (6.5 in), which includes a tail 1.5 cm (0.59 in) long. The diameter of the body is 0.3 cm (0.12 in).

== Reproduction ==
M. boueti is oviparous.
