= Mann's worm snake =

Conservation status
- Data Deficient (IUCN 3.1)

Scientific classification
- Kingdom: Animalia
- Phylum: Chordata
- Class: Reptilia
- Order: Squamata
- Suborder: Serpentes
- Family: Typhlopidae
- Genus: Letheobia
- Species: L. manni

Binomial name
- Letheobia manni Loveridge, 1941

Synonyms
- Typhlops manni Loveridge, 1941; Letheobia manni — Hedges et al., 2014; Afrotyphlos manni — Pyron & Wallach, 2014; Letheobia manni — Wallach & Gemel, 2018

Species of snake

Mann's worm snake (Letheobia manni) is a species of blind snake in the family Typhlopidae. The species is native to West Africa.

== Etymology ==
The specific name, manni, is in honor of William Montana Mann, who was an American entomologist and zoo director.

== Description ==
Letheobia manni has a broad, trilobate snout. It has 26 rows of scales around the body at midbody. The total length (tail included) is 40 times the diameter of the body at midbody.

== Geographic range ==
Letheobia manni is found in Guinea and Liberia, at altitudes from sea level to 500 m (1,600 ft).

== Reproduction ==
Letheobia manni is oviparous.
