= Léopoldville beaked snake =

Conservation status
- Least Concern (IUCN 3.1)

Scientific classification
- Kingdom: Animalia
- Phylum: Chordata
- Class: Reptilia
- Order: Squamata
- Suborder: Serpentes
- Family: Typhlopidae
- Genus: Letheobia
- Species: L. praeocularis

Binomial name
- Letheobia praeocularis (Stejneger, 1894)

Synonyms
- Typhlops præocularis Stejneger, 1894; Rhinotyphlops praeocularis; Rox-Estève, 1974

Species of snake

The Léopoldville beaked snake (Letheobia praeocularis) is a species of snake in the Typhlopidae family. It is endemic to Africa.
