= Letheobia wittei =

Scientific classification
- Kingdom: Animalia
- Phylum: Chordata
- Class: Reptilia
- Order: Squamata
- Suborder: Serpentes
- Family: Typhlopidae
- Genus: Letheobia
- Species: L. wittei

Binomial name
- Letheobia wittei (Roux-Estève, 1974)

Synonyms
- Rhinotyphlops wittei Roux-Estève, 1974; Letheobia wittei — Broadley & Wallach, 2000

Species of snake

Letheobia wittei, also known commonly as De Witte's gracile blind snake or Witte's beaked snake, is a species of snake in the family Typhlopidae. The species is endemic to Africa.

== Etymology ==
The specific name, wittei, is in honor of Belgian herpetologist Gaston-François de Witte.

== Habitat ==
The preferred natural habitat of L. wittei is lowland rainforest.

== Reproduction ==
L. wittei is oviparous.
