= Liberia worm snake =

Scientific classification
- Kingdom: Animalia
- Phylum: Chordata
- Class: Reptilia
- Order: Squamata
- Suborder: Serpentes
- Family: Typhlopidae
- Genus: Letheobia
- Species: L. leucosticta

Binomial name
- Letheobia leucosticta (Boulenger, 1898)

Synonyms
- Typhlops leucostictus; Letheobia leucostictus

Species of snake

The Liberia worm snake (Letheobia leucosticta) is a species of snake in the Typhlopidae family.
