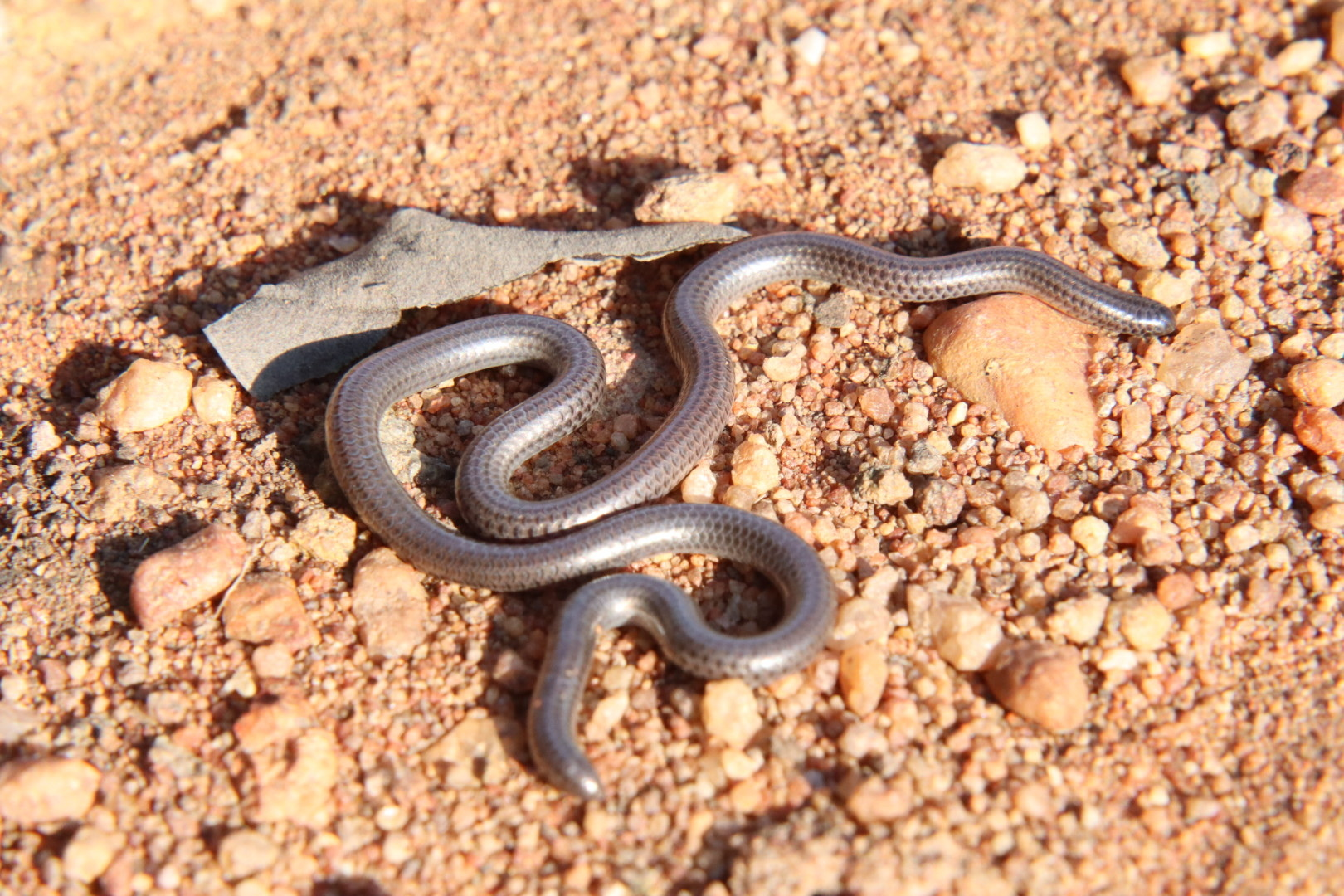
- Leptotyphlops distanti

Scientific classification
- Kingdom: Animalia
- Phylum: Chordata
- Class: Reptilia
- Order: Squamata
- Suborder: Serpentes
- Family: Leptotyphlopidae
- Genus: Leptotyphlops; Fitzinger, 1843

Synonyms
- Stenostoma Wagler, 1824 (preoccupied); Typhlina Wagler, 1830; Stenostona Cuvier, 1836; Leptotyphlops Fitzinger, 1843; Eucephalus Fitzinger, 1843; Catodon A.M.C.Duméril & Bibron, 1844; Glauconia Gray, 1845; Rena Baird & Girard, 1853; Sabrina Girard, 1857; Ramphostoma Jan in Jan & Sordelli, 1860; Tricheilostoma Jan in Jan & Sordelli, 1860; Tetracheilostoma Jan, 1861; Siagonodon W. Peters, 1881; Stenostomophis Rochebrune, 1884; Rhamphostoma Boulenger, 1893

= Leptotyphlops =

Genus of snakes

Leptotyphlops is a genus of nonvenomous blind snakes, commonly known as slender blind snakes and threadsnakes, in the family Leptotyphlopidae. The genus is endemic to and found throughout Africa. Eleven species have been moved to the genus Trilepida, and other species have been moved to the genera Epacrophis, Epictia, Mitophis, Myriopholis, Namibiana, Rena, Siagonodon, Tetracheilostoma, and Tricheilostoma.

== Description ==
Most species of Leptotyphlops look much like shiny earthworms. They are generally black, grey, or blackish-brown and their scales give them a segmented appearance. Their common name comes from the fact that their eyes are greatly reduced almost to the point of uselessness, and hidden behind a protective head scale. The species which are called thread snakes are so named because of their very narrow, long bodies.

== Behavior ==
All blind snakes including those of the genus Leptotyphlops are burrowing snakes, spending most of their time deep in loose soil, typically only emerging when it rains and they get flooded out.

== Diet ==
The primary diet of Leptotyphlops is ant and termite larvae.

== Species ==
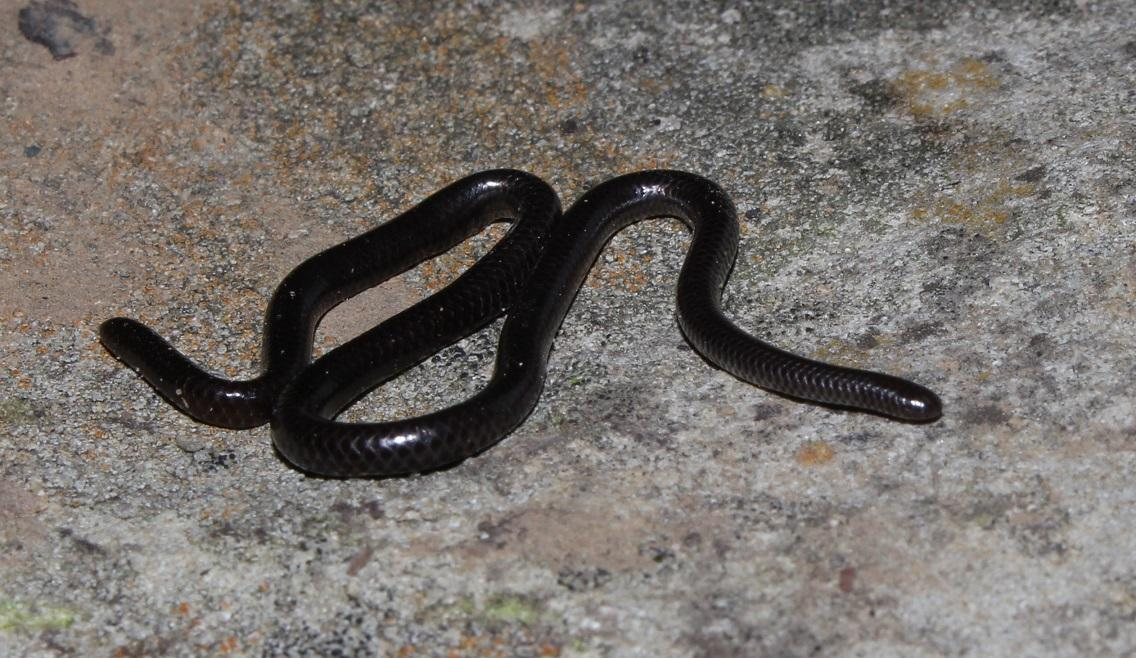
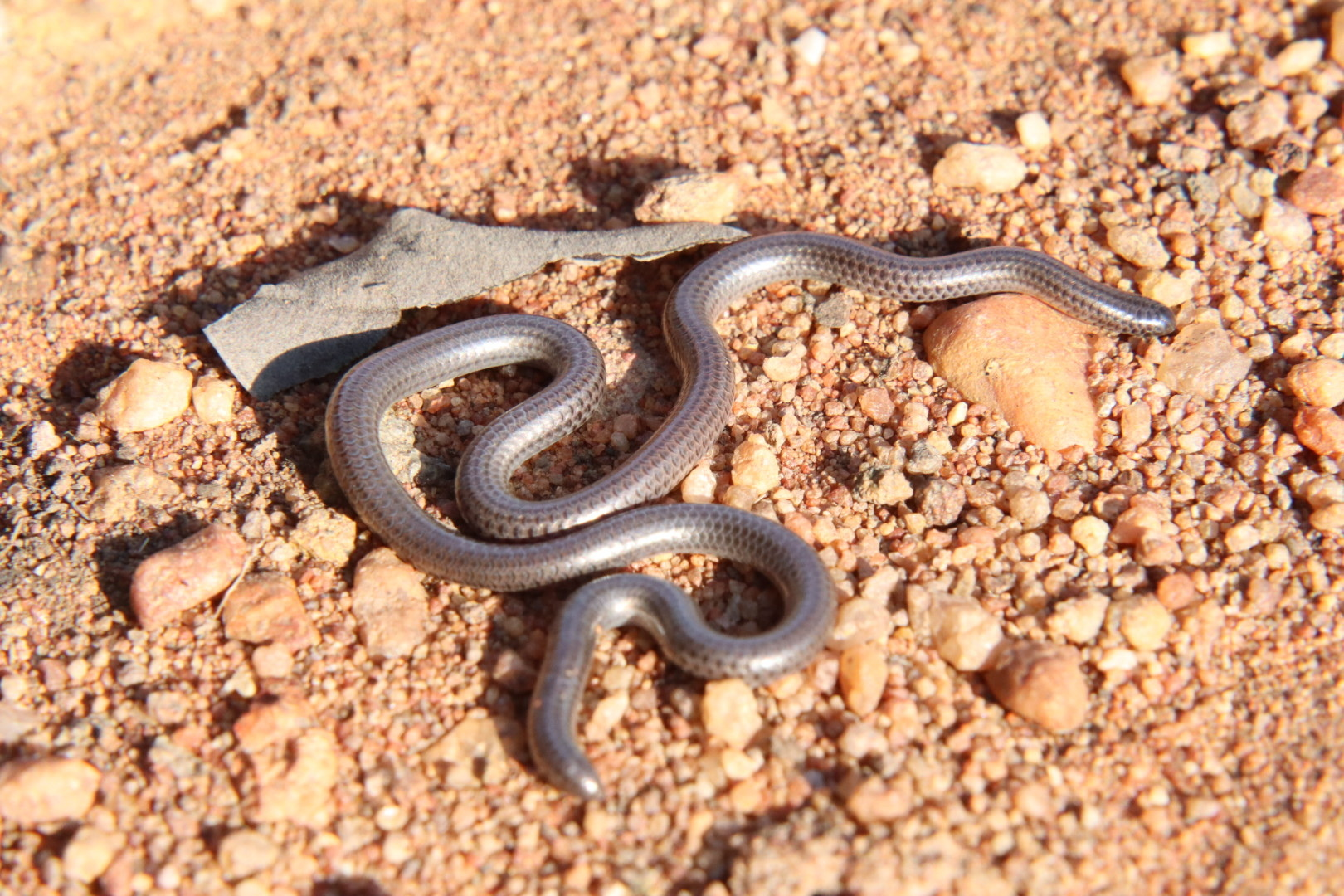
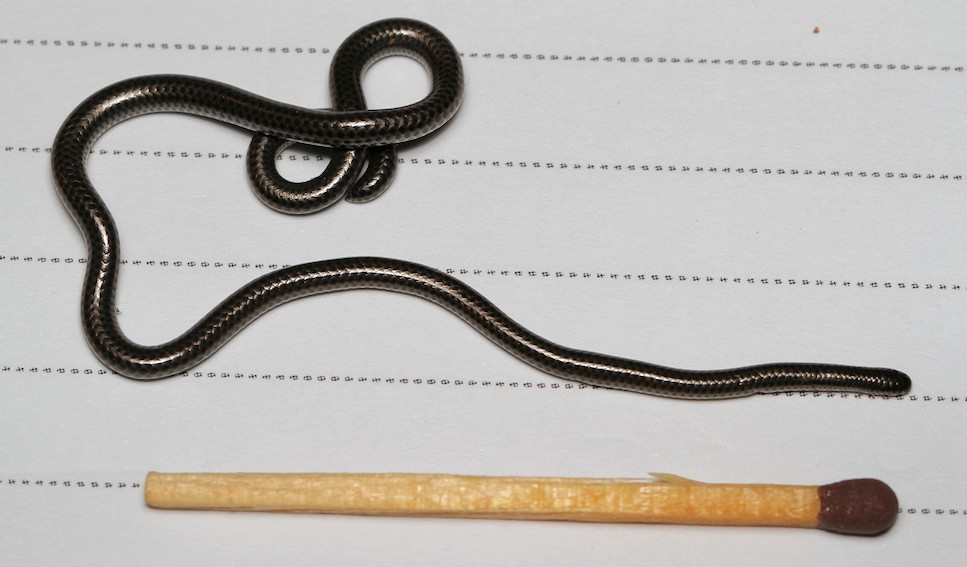
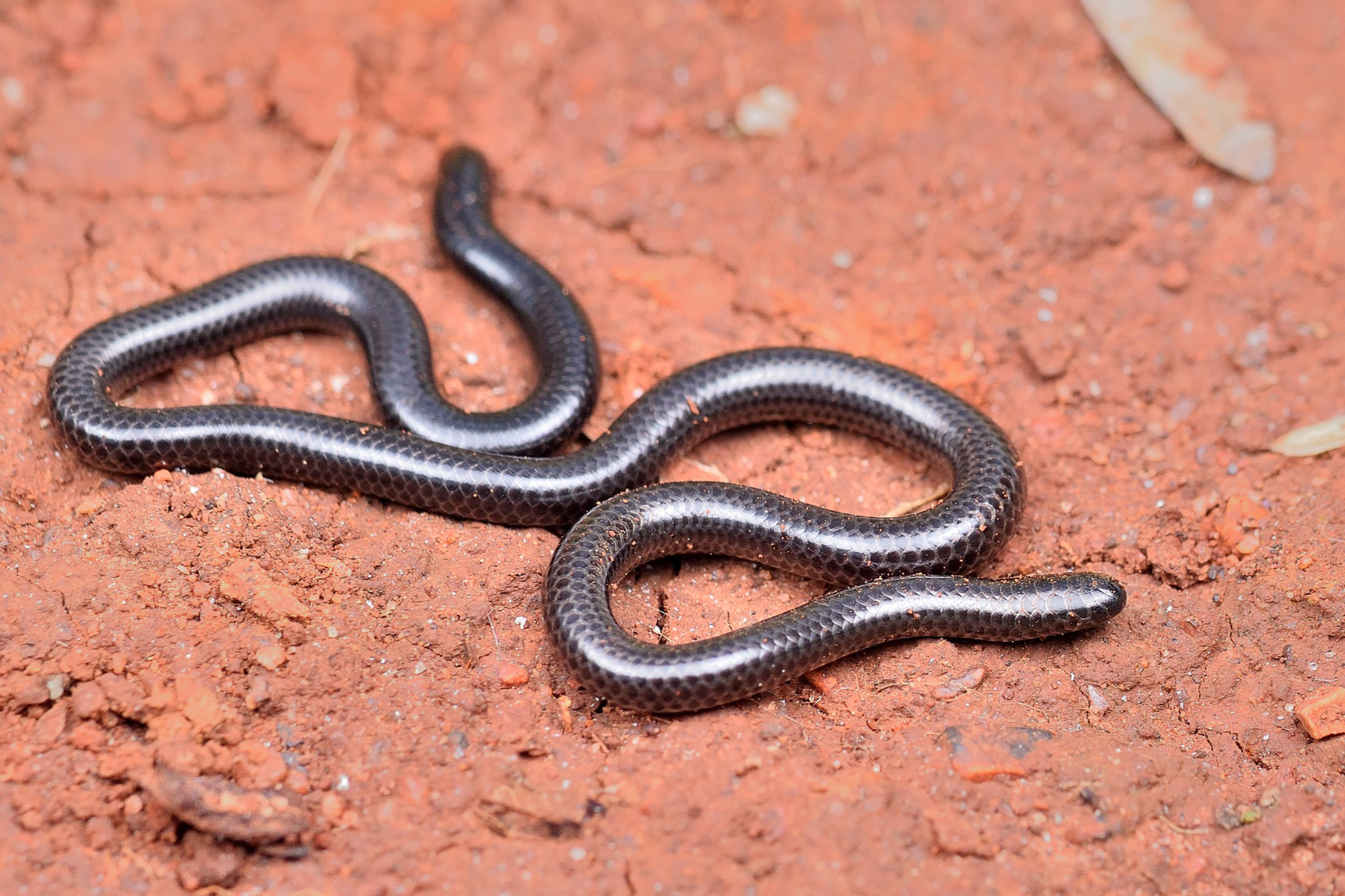
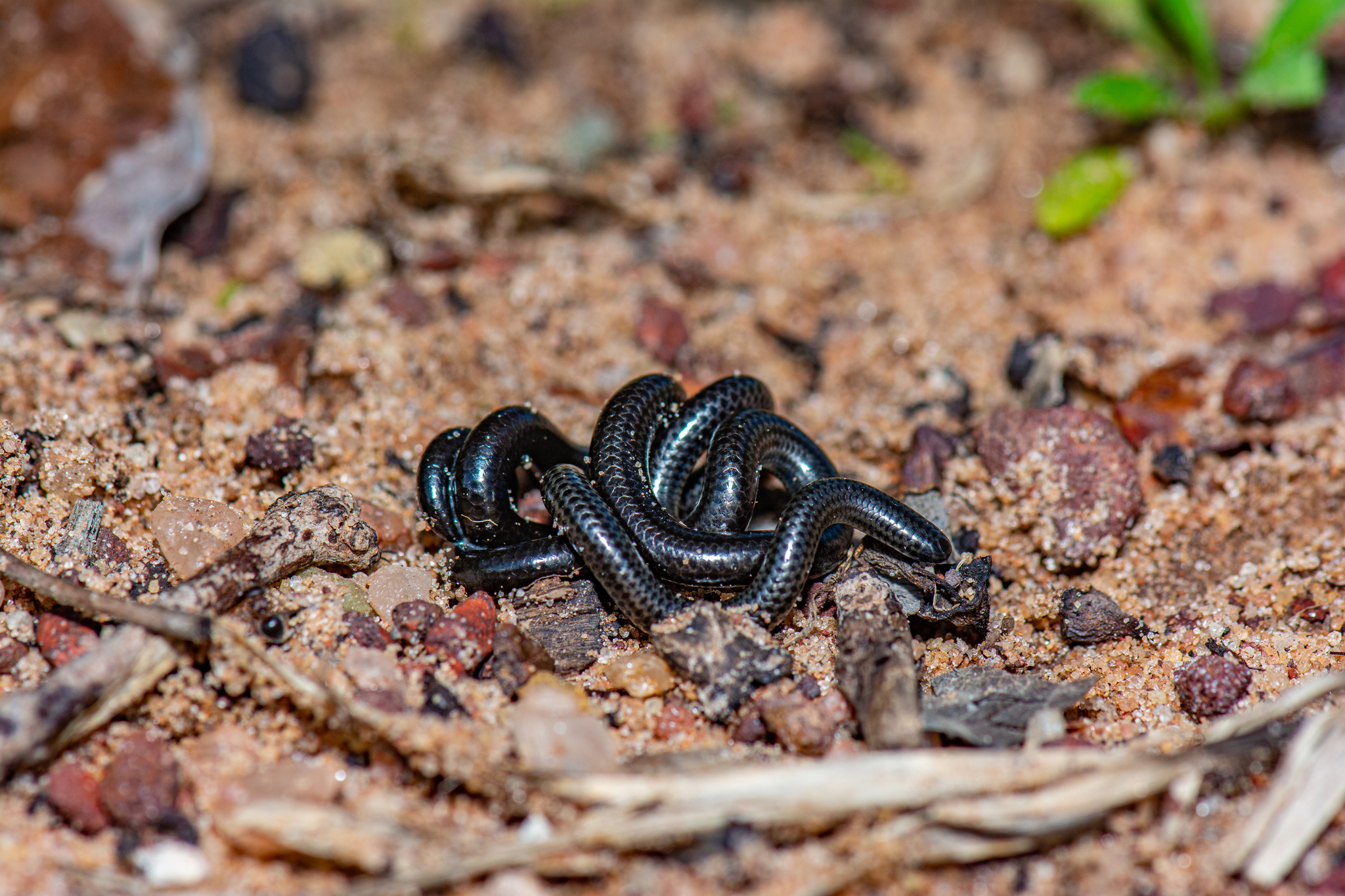
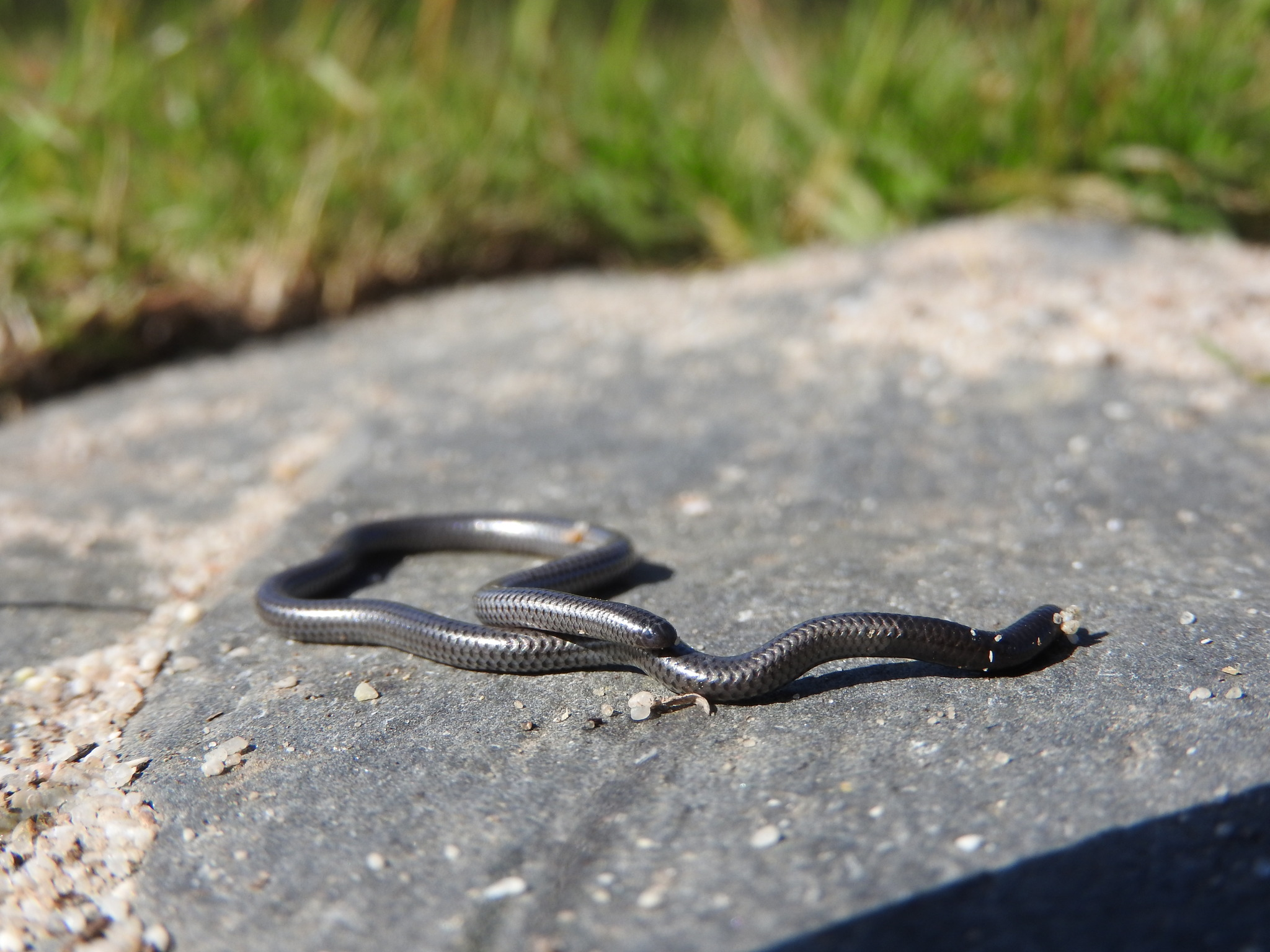
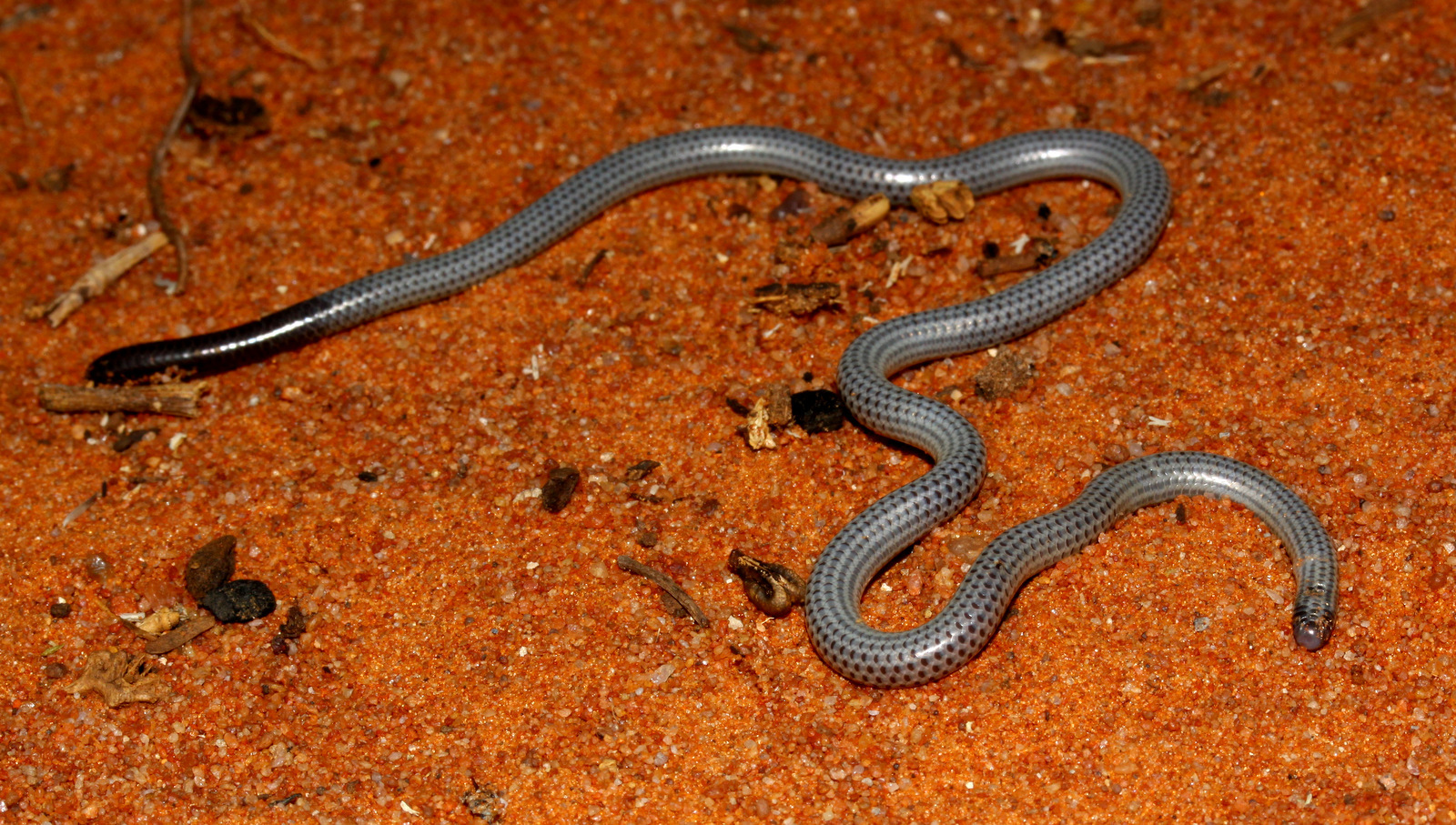
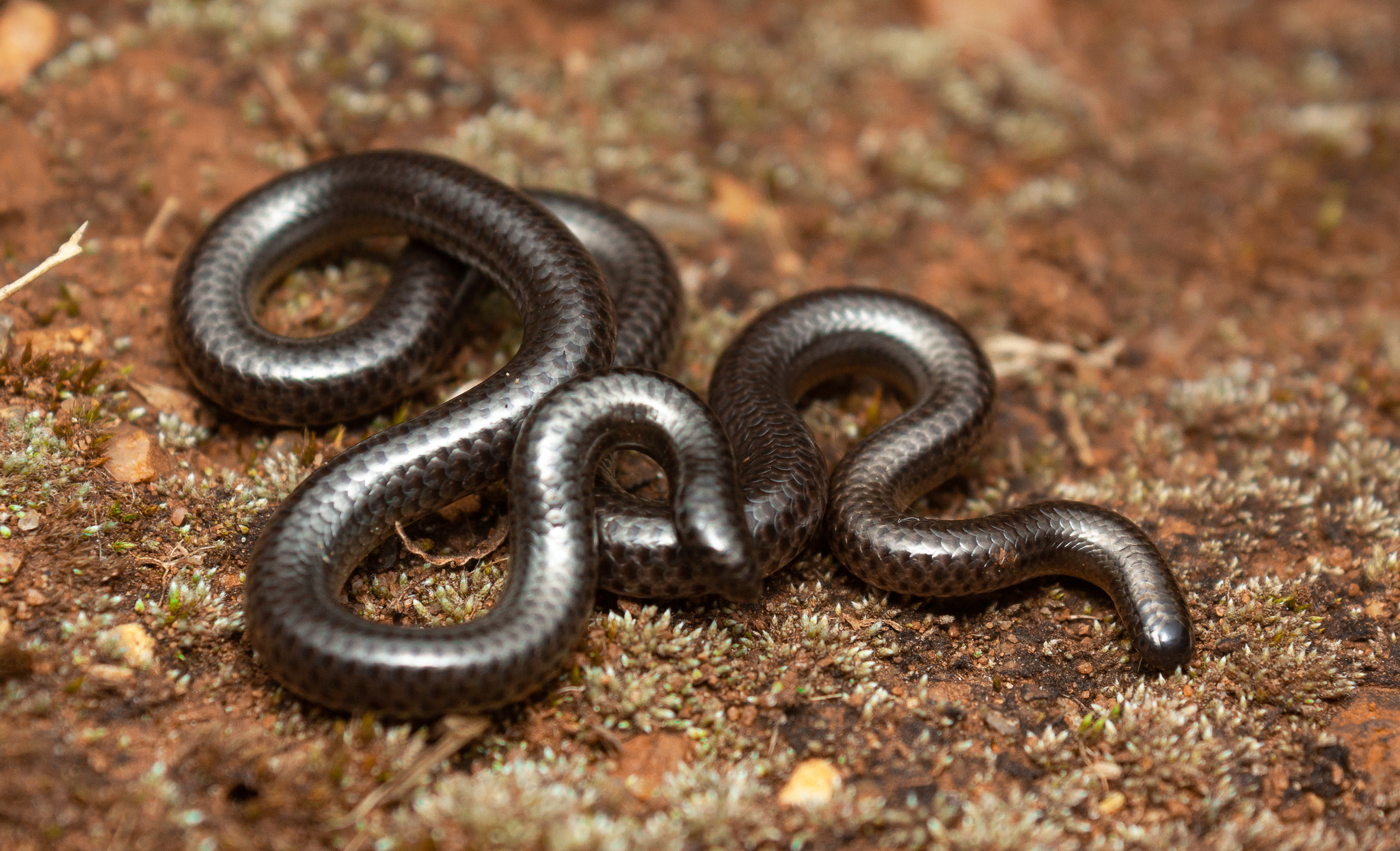
| Common name | Scientific name | Taxon author | Habitat & Range |
|---|---|---|---|
| Ethiopian worm snake | Leptotyphlops aethiopicus | Broadley & Wallach, 2007 | Habitat: Forest, grassland Range: Ethiopia, Kenya |
| Cape thread snake | Leptotyphlops conjunctus | (Jan, 1861) | Habitat: Grassland Range: South Africa (Eastern Cape Province) |
| Distant's thread snake | Leptotyphlops distanti | (Boulenger, 1892) | Habitat: Savanna, grassland Range: Mozambique, South Africa (Limpopo Province, North-West Province, Mpumalanga, Gauteng) |
| Emin Pasha's worm snake | Leptotyphlops emini | (Boulenger, 1890) | Habitat: Savanna, shrubland Range: The Democratic Republic of the Congo, Kenya, South Sudan, United Republic of Tanzania, Uganda, Zambia |
| Howell's worm snake | Leptotyphlops howelli | Broadley & Wallach, 2007 | Habitat: Forest, savanna Range: Kenya, United Republic of Tanzania |
| Incognito thread snake | Leptotyphlops incognitus | Broadley & Watson, 1976 | Habitat: Savanna, grassland Range: Eswatini, Mozambique, South Africa (Gauteng, KwaZulu-Natal, Limpopo Province, Mpumalanga), Zambia, Zimbabwe |
| Jacobsen's thread snake | Leptotyphlops jacobseni | Broadley & S. Broadley, 1999 | Habitat: Grassland Range: South Africa (Limpopo Province, Mpumalanga) |
| Shaba thread snake | Leptotyphlops kafubi | (Boulenger, 1919) | Habitat: Savanna, artificial / terrestrial Range: Angola, Congo, The Democratic Republic of the Congo, Zambia |
| Mount Kenya worm snake | Leptotyphlops keniensis | Broadley & Wallach, 2007 | Habitat: Shrubland Range: Kenya, United Republic of Tanzania |
| Uvira worm snake | Leptotyphlops latirostris | (Sternfeld, 1912) | Habitat: Savanna Range: Burundi, The Democratic Republic of the Congo, United Republic of Tanzania |
| Goggle-eyed worm snake | Leptotyphlops macrops | Broadley & Wallach, 1996 | Habitat: Forest, savanna, artificial / terrestrial Range: Kenya, United Republic of Tanzania |
| Mbanja worm snake | Leptotyphlops mbanjensis | Broadley & Wallach, 2007 | Habitat: Artificial / terrestrial Range: United Republic of Tanzania |
| Merker's thread snake | Leptotyphlops merkeri | (F. Werner, 1909) | Habitat: Savanna, shrubland, grassland, artificial / terrestrial, introduced vegetation Range: Kenya, United Republic of Tanzania |
| Black thread snake | Leptotyphlops nigricans^{T} | (Schlegel, 1839) | Habitat: Savanna, shrubland, grassland Range: South Africa (Eastern Cape Province, Western Cape) |
| Black-tip worm snake | Leptotyphlops nigroterminus | Broadley & Wallach, 2007 | Habitat: Savanna, shrubland Range: Kenya, United Republic of Tanzania |
| Pemba worm snake | Leptotyphlops pembae | Loveridge, 1941 | Habitat: Grassland, artificial / terrestrial Range: Pemba Island, Tanzania |
| Pitman's thread snake | Leptotyphlops pitmani | Broadley & Wallach, 2007 | Habitat: Savanna Range: Kenya, Rwanda, United Republic of Tanzania, Uganda |
| N/A | Leptotyphlops pungwensis | Broadley & Wallach, 1997 | Range: Mozambique |
| Peter's thread snake | Leptotyphlops scutifrons | (W. Peters, 1854) | Habitat: Savanna, shrubland, grassland Range: Angola, Botswana, Eswatini, Lesotho, Namibia, South Africa, Zimbabwe |
| Forest thread snake | Leptotyphlops sylvicolus | Broadley & Wallach, 1997 | Habitat: Forest, grassland Range: South Africa (KwaZulu-Natal, Eastern Cape Province) |
| Tello's thread snake | Leptotyphlops telloi | Broadley & Watson, 1976 | Habitat: Savanna Range: Eswatini, Mozambique |

^{T}) Type species.
