= Leptotyphlops kafubi =

Conservation status
- Least Concern (IUCN 3.1)

Scientific classification
- Kingdom: Animalia
- Phylum: Chordata
- Class: Reptilia
- Order: Squamata
- Suborder: Serpentes
- Family: Leptotyphlopidae
- Genus: Leptotyphlops
- Species: L. kafubi

Binomial name
- Leptotyphlops kafubi (Boulenger, 1919)

Synonyms
- Glauconia kafubi Boulenger, 1919

Species of thread snake found in south-central Africa

Leptotyphlops kafubi, also known as the Shaba thread snake, is a species of slender, fossorial snake in the family Leptotyphlopidae. It is found in parts of south-central Africa, including Angola, the Democratic Republic of the Congo, and Zambia.

== Taxonomy ==
Leptotyphlops kafubi was first described by George Albert Boulenger in 1919 as Glauconia kafubi. It has sometimes been treated as a synonym of Leptotyphlops nigricans, but was revalidated as a distinct species based on morphological differences.

== Description ==
Like other thread snakes, L. kafubi is a small, slender, burrowing snake adapted to a subterranean lifestyle. It has a cylindrical body, smooth, shiny scales, and greatly reduced eyes, which are covered by head scales. Its coloration is typically uniform and earth-toned, similar to other members of the genus, and it closely resembles an earthworm in appearance.

== Distribution and habitat ==
Leptotyphlops kafubi occurs in southern and central Africa, with confirmed records from Angola, Democratic Republic of the Congo (Katanga/Shaba region), and Zambia. Its preferred habitat is savannas, but it may also be found in disturbed or artificial terrestrial environments.

== Ecology and behavior ==
Leptotyphlops kafubi is a burrowing snake that feeds primarily on the larvae, pupae and small insects. Like other blind snakes, it is secretive and rarely seen above ground except after heavy rains or when disturbed.
