= Myriopholis algeriensis =

Conservation status
- Least Concern (IUCN 3.1)

Scientific classification
- Kingdom: Animalia
- Phylum: Chordata
- Class: Reptilia
- Order: Squamata
- Suborder: Serpentes
- Family: Leptotyphlopidae
- Genus: Myriopholis
- Species: M. algeriensis

Binomial name
- Myriopholis algeriensis (Jacquet, 1895)

Synonyms
- Glauconia algeriensis; Glauconia natatrix; Leptotyphlops natatrix; Leptotyphlops macrorhynchus algeriensis; Leptotyphlops algeriensis; Myriopholis natatrix

Species of snake

Myriopholis algeriensis is a species of snake in the family Leptotyphlopidae.
