= Eritrean blind snake =

Conservation status
- Data Deficient (IUCN 3.1)

Scientific classification
- Kingdom: Animalia
- Phylum: Chordata
- Class: Reptilia
- Order: Squamata
- Suborder: Serpentes
- Family: Typhlopidae
- Genus: Letheobia
- Species: L. erythraea

Binomial name
- Letheobia erythraea (Scortecci, 1929)

Synonyms
- Typhlops erythraeus Scortecci, 1929; Rhinotyphlops erythraeus – McDiarmid et al., 1999; Letheobia erythraea – Largen & Spawls, 2010

Species of snake

The Eritrean blind snake (Letheobia erythraea) is a species of snake in the Typhlopidae family. It is endemic to Eritrea.
