= Wilson's blind snake =

Conservation status
- Data Deficient (IUCN 3.1)

Scientific classification
- Kingdom: Animalia
- Phylum: Chordata
- Class: Reptilia
- Order: Squamata
- Suborder: Serpentes
- Family: Leptotyphlopidae
- Genus: Myriopholis
- Species: M. wilsoni

Binomial name
- Myriopholis wilsoni Hahn, 1978

Synonyms
- Leptotyphlops wilsoni Hahn, 1978; Myriopholis wilsoni — Adalsteinsson et al., 2009

Species of snake

Wilson's blind snake (Myriopholis wilsoni) is a species of snake in the family Leptotyphlopidae. The species is native to Yemen.

== Etymology ==
The specific name, wilsoni, is in honor of American mammalogist Don Ellis Wilson.

== Geographic range ==
M. wilsoni is endemic to the island of Socotra in Yemen.

== Habitat ==
The preferred natural habitats of M. wilsoni are forest and shrubland, at altitudes from sea level to 995 m (3,264 ft).

== Reproduction ==
M. wilsoni is oviparous.
