= White-bellied worm snake =

Conservation status
- Least Concern (IUCN 3.1)

Scientific classification
- Kingdom: Animalia
- Phylum: Chordata
- Class: Reptilia
- Order: Squamata
- Suborder: Serpentes
- Family: Leptotyphlopidae
- Genus: Myriopholis
- Species: M. albiventer

Binomial name
- Myriopholis albiventer (Hallermann & Rödel, 1995)

Synonyms
- Leptotyphlops albiventer

Species of snake

The white-bellied worm snake (Myriopholis albiventer) is a species of snake in the family Leptotyphlopidae.
