= Melanoseps longicauda =

Conservation status
- Data Deficient (IUCN 3.1)

Scientific classification
- Kingdom: Animalia
- Phylum: Chordata
- Class: Reptilia
- Order: Squamata
- Family: Scincidae
- Genus: Melanoseps
- Species: M. longicauda

Binomial name
- Melanoseps longicauda Tornier, 1900

Species of skink

The Pangani black limbless skink or longtail limbless skink (Melanoseps longicauda) is an extant species of skink, a lizard in the family Scincidae. The species is found in Tanzania.
