= Letheobia uluguruensis =

Conservation status
- Endangered (IUCN 3.1)

Scientific classification
- Kingdom: Animalia
- Phylum: Chordata
- Class: Reptilia
- Order: Squamata
- Suborder: Serpentes
- Family: Typhlopidae
- Genus: Letheobia
- Species: L. uluguruensis

Binomial name
- Letheobia uluguruensis (Barbour & Loveridge, 1928)

Synonyms
- Typhlops uluguruensis

Species of snake

Letheobia uluguruensis, also known as the Uluguru gracile blind snake or Uluguri worm snake, is a species of snake in the Typhlopidae family. This species is endemic to the Uluguru Mountains of eastern Tanzania.
