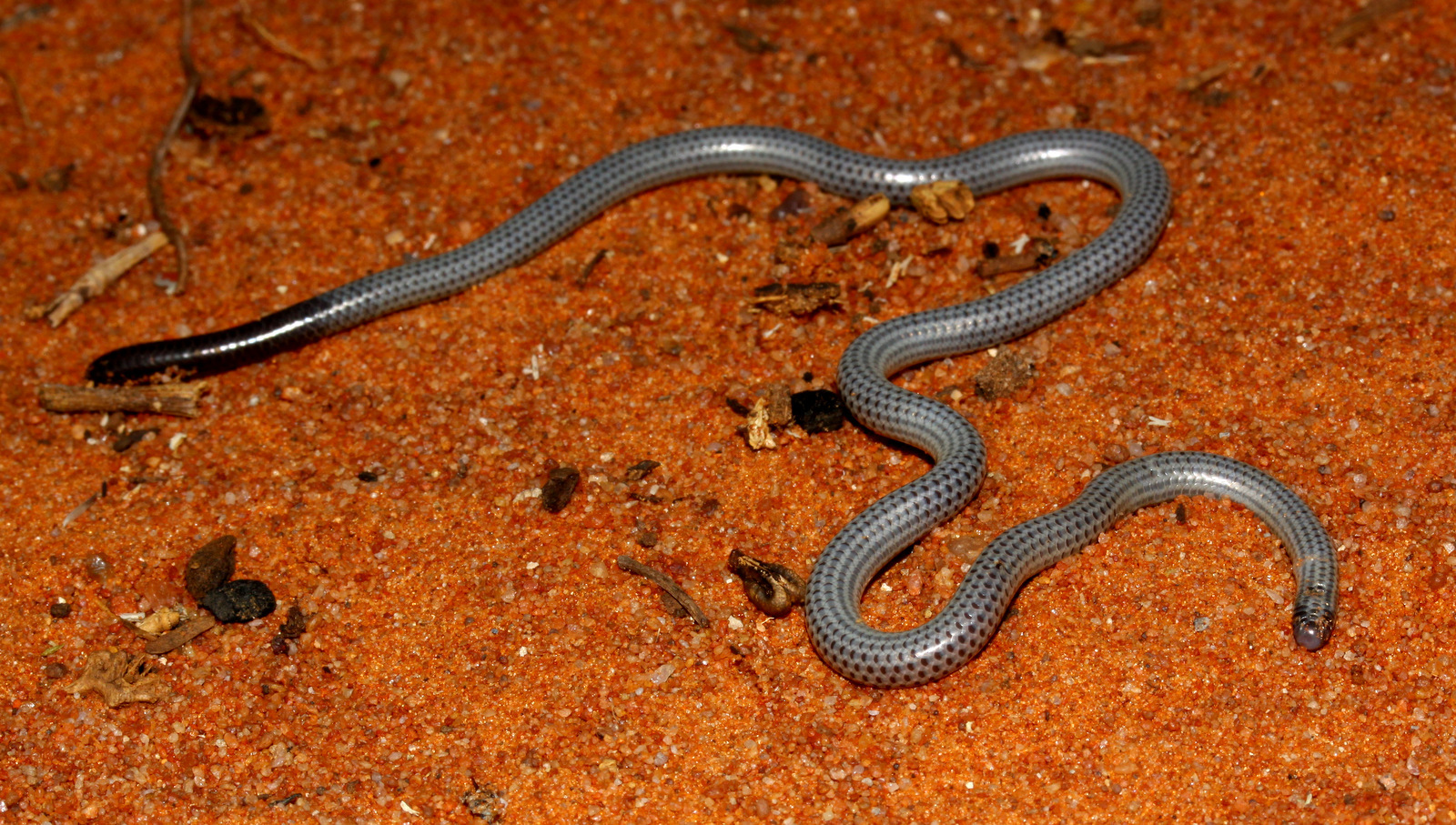
- L. scutifrons at Tswalu Kalahari Reserve

Conservation status
- Least Concern (IUCN 3.1)

Scientific classification
- Kingdom: Animalia
- Phylum: Chordata
- Class: Reptilia
- Order: Squamata
- Suborder: Serpentes
- Family: Leptotyphlopidae
- Genus: Leptotyphlops
- Species: L. scutifrons

Binomial name
- Leptotyphlops scutifrons (Peters, 1854)

Synonyms
- Stenostoma scutifrons; Glauconia scutifrons; Glauconia okahandjana

= Peters's threadsnake =

Species of snake

Peters's threadsnake (Leptotyphlops scutifrons) is a species of snake in the family Leptotyphlopidae. It is widely distributed in Southern Africa. Following the recognition of its former subspecies, Leptotyphlops pitmani and Leptotyphlops merkeri, as full species, L. scutifrons is no longer thought to occur in East Africa. The limits of its range are still unclear, but it is thought to be present in Angola, Namibia, Botswana, Zimbabwe, South Africa, Eswatini, and western Lesotho.

== Gallery ==
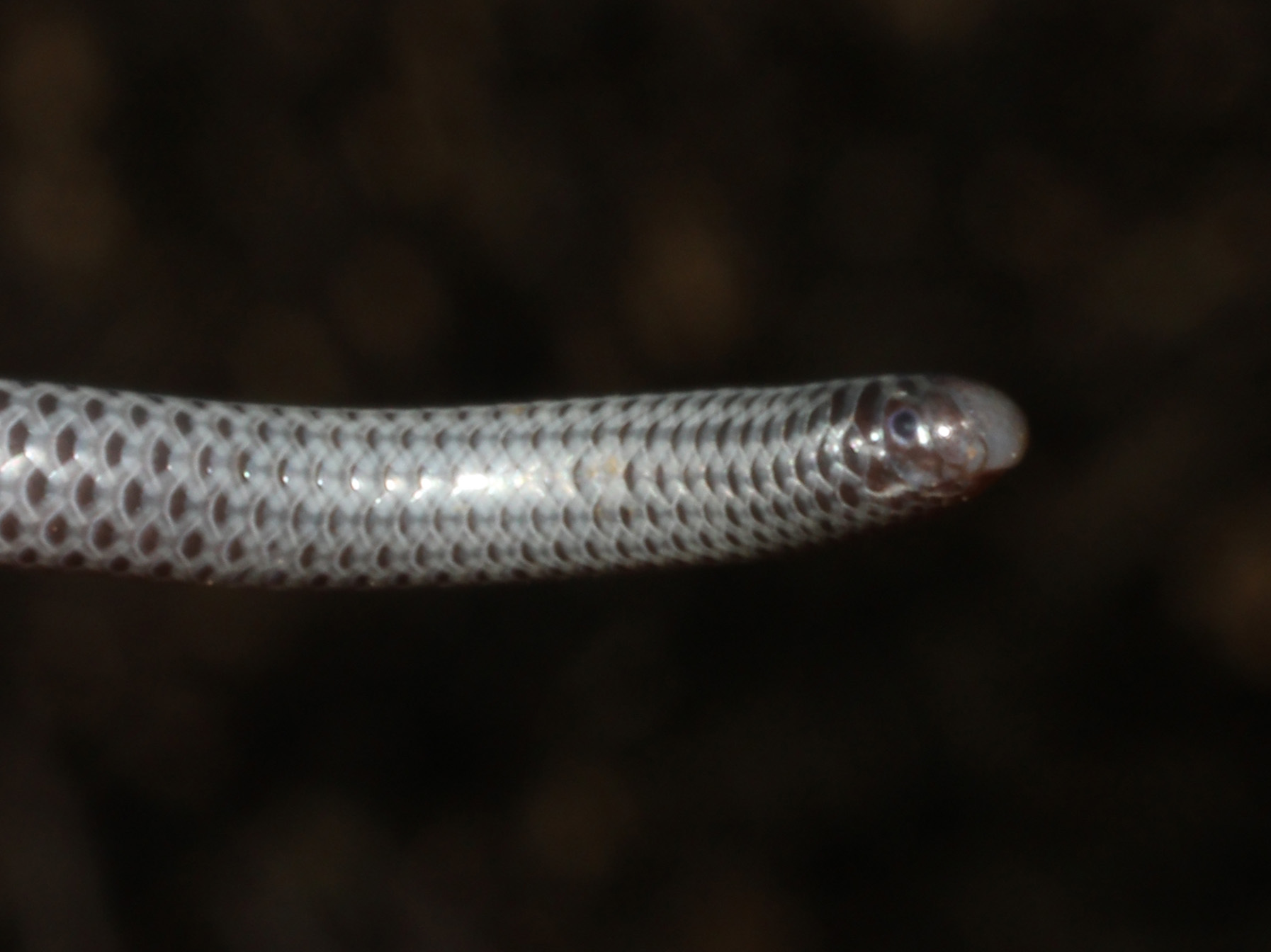
Close up shot of L. scutifrons

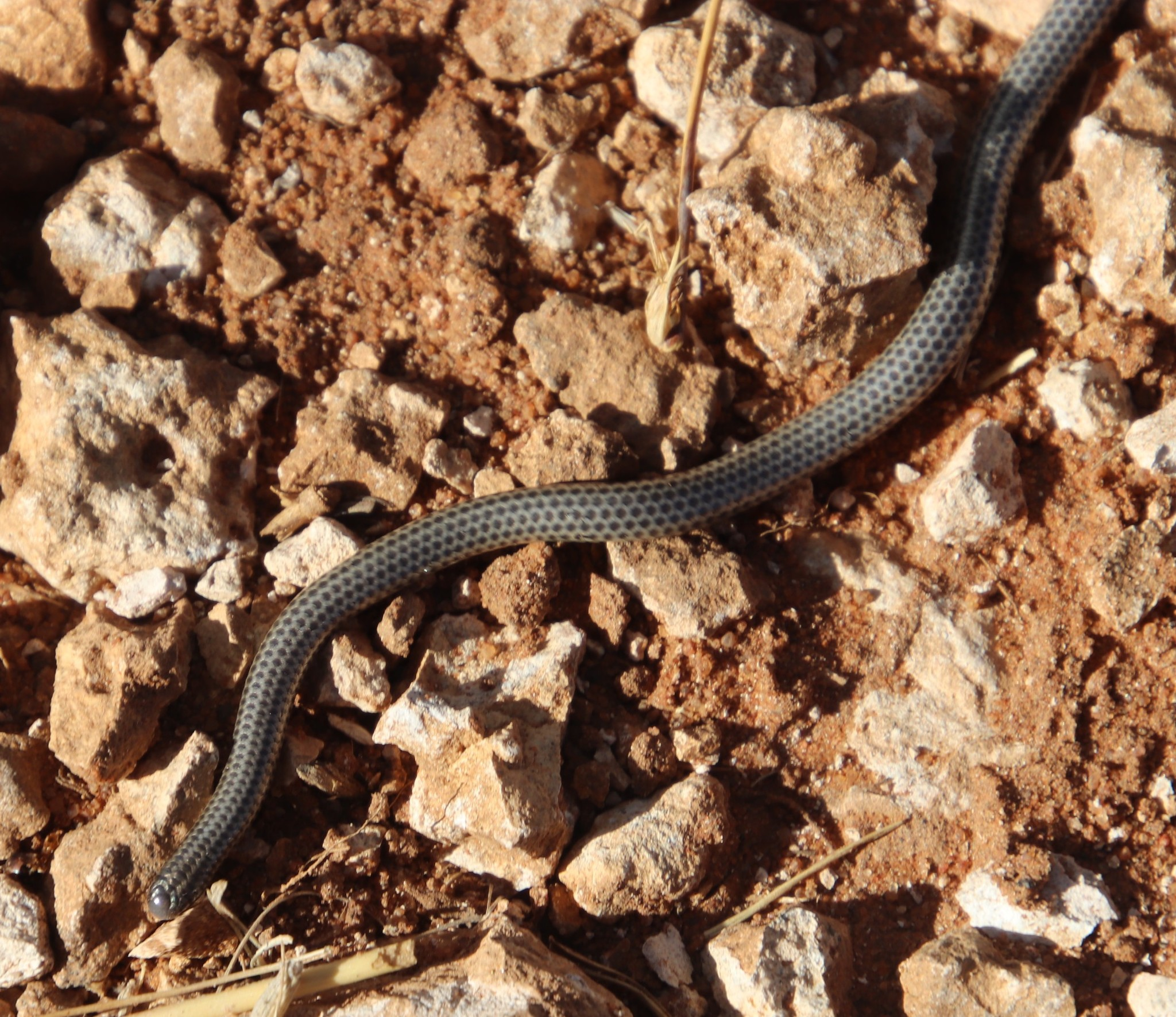
L. scutifrons
