= Rolande Roux-Estève =

French herpetologist (1921–2009)

Rolande Roux-Estève (10 October 1921 – 6 July 2009 in Levallois-Perret, Département Hauts-de-Seine) was a French herpetologist and ichthyologist. She began her career with the study of fish, but during her time in the Congo began studying African blind snakes (typhlopidae).

== Biography ==
Roux-Estève was born in Toulouse on 10 October 1921; her father worked as a mathematician at the university there. Rolande graduated from the University of Toulouse with her bachelor's degree in mathematics in 1939.

In November 1942, she took a position at the National Museum of Natural History, France in Paris. Roux-Estève was working mainly with fish, including those collected in the Red Sea during expeditions of the research vessel Calypso led by Jacques-Yves Cousteau. In 1952, she changed her name to Rolande Roux-Estève after marrying the biologist Charles Roux. They lived for a time in the Congo (now Republic of Congo).

=== Blind snakes ===
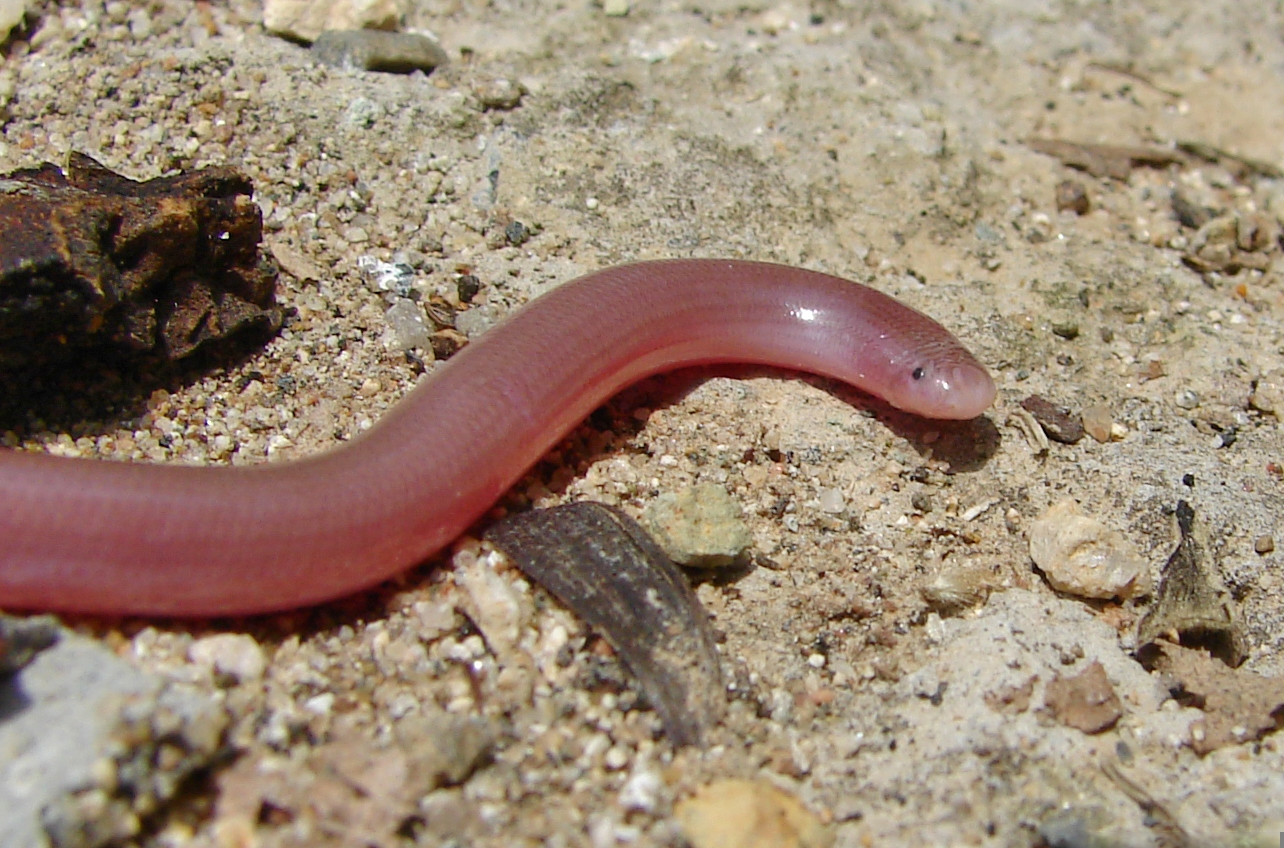
European blind snake (Xerotyphlops vermicularis)

On her return to Paris and the museum, one of her significant tasks was the identification of the museum's many snake specimens. Roux-Estève's herpetological research comprised 22 titles published between 1962 and 1995, 15 of which dealt with African snakes. Her main interest was blind snakes, which she also made the subject of her doctoral thesis, Recherches sur la morphologie, la biogéographie et la phylogenie des Typhlopidae d'Afrique (Dr.sci.nat. at the Pierre and Marie Curie University in 1975). Her dissertation was published in two parts in 1975 and represents her most notable publication. One of these parts, a 313-page monograph on African blind snakes, required handling enormous quantitative datasets, which benefited from her early training in mathematics. Because the vast majority of these snake species are characterized by small body size, counting the scales on large samples became a demanding task, requiring a great deal of patience and diligence.

Roux-Estève's writings covered a range of topics: identifications of collections belonging to French and Belgian nationals, careful taxonomic surveys of species or genera, guides to local snake faunas, studies of morphology, biogeography and phylogeny, and lists of specimens in the Paris Museum.

She named new taxa, including Letheobia (formerly Rhinotyphlops) wittei (Roux-Estève, 1974) from Zaire, Madatyphlops (formerly Typhlops) domerguei (Roux-Estève, 1980) from Madagascar, the blind snake species Myriopholis (formerly Leptotyphlops) perreti (Roux-Estève, 1979) from Cameroon, the adder species Philothamnus hughesi Trape & Roux-Estève, 1990 from Cameroon, the Central African Republic, the Democratic Republic of the Congo, the Republic of the Congo, Gabon, South Sudan and Uganda, the African blind snake genus Rhinoleptus Orejas-Miranda, Roux-Estève & Guibé, 1970 and the skink species Melanoseps loveridgei Brygoo & Roux-Estève, 1982 from Tanzania,

She was invited to join a select group of academics to help form a new professional association in 1979, the Society of European Herpetologists. She was a representative of France for the initial group.

== Dedication names ==
Several species were named after Roux-Estève in honor of her contributions to herpetology:

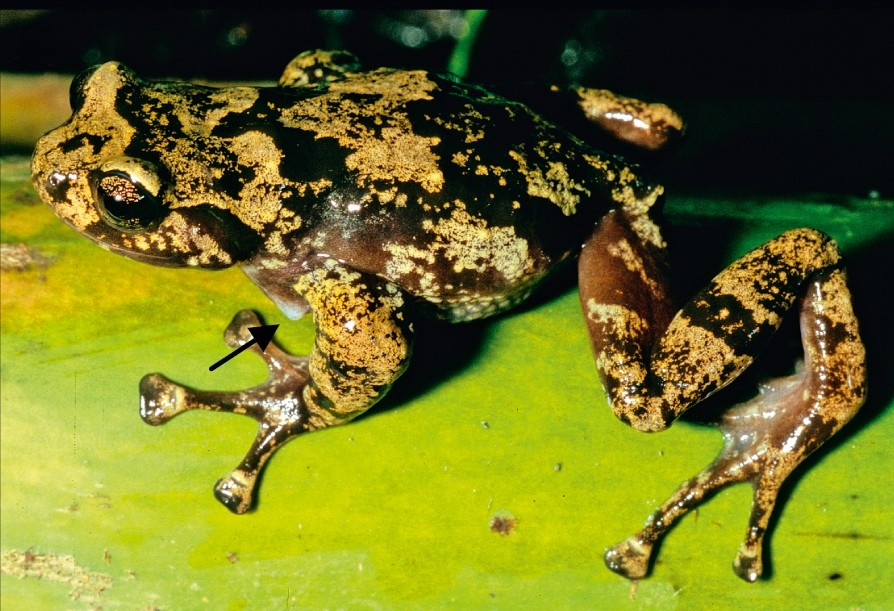
Anodonthyla rouxae, a climbing frog, named after Roux-Estève, that is endemic to Madagascar.

- The double creeper species Cynisca rouxae Hahn, 1979
- The climbing frog species Anodonthyla rouxae Guibe 1974
- The blind snake species Afrotyphlops rouxestevae Trape, 2019
- The worm snake Myriopholis rouxestevae Trape & Mané, 2004

== Selected publications ==
- Bertin, Léon and Rolande Roux-Estève. "Catalogue des types de poissons du Muséum National d'Histoire Naturelle." (1939).
- Roux-Estève, Rolande. Révision systématique des Typhlopidae d'Afrique Reptilia-Serpentes. Éditions du Muséum, 1974.
- Jean François, W. E., and Rolande Roux-Estève. "L Note sur une collection de serpents du Congo avec description d'une espèce nouvelle."
- Brygoo, E. R., and Rolande Roux-Esteve. "Un genre de lezards scincines d’Afrique: Melanoseps." Bull. Mus. Natn. Hist. Nat. Paris 4ème sér 3 (1981): 1169–1191.
- Trape, Jean-François, and Rolande Roux-Estève. "Les serpents du Congo: liste commentée et clé de détermination." Journal of African Zoology 109, no. 1 (1995): 31–50.
