= Villafana =

Villafana or Villafaña is a surname. Notable people with the surname include:

- Ian Villafana (born 1957), American jazz guitarist
- Jorge Villafaña (born 1989), American soccer player
- Manny Villafaña (born 1940), American businessman
- Percy Villafana, Trinidadian personality
