= Epiphany =

Epiphany may refer to:

== Psychology ==
- Epiphany (feeling), an experience of sudden and striking insight

== Religion ==
- Epiphany (holiday), a Christian holiday commemorating the believed visit of the Magi
  - Epiphany season, or Epiphanytide, the liturgical season following the Christian holiday
- Theophany, the manifestation of a deity in an observable way
  - Epiphany (ancient Greece), the visitation or manifestation of a god

== Computing ==
- Epiphany, Inc., a software development company, formerly known as E.piphany
- Epiphany, the code name and former name of GNOME Web
- Epiphany, a multi-core processor made by Adapteva (now Zero ASIC)

== Art ==
- The Epiphany (Bosch), a triptych and earlier panel painting Epiphany by Hieronymus Bosch
- Epiphany, a painting by Dutch painter Gerbrand van den Eeckhout
- Epifania, a drawing by Michelangelo

== Literature ==
- Epiphany (literature), epiphany as a literary device
- Epiphany (novel), a 1997 novel by David Hewson
- "Epiphany", a 1999 short story by Connie Willis

== Film and television ==
- "Epiphany" (Angel), a 2001 episode of Angel
- "Epiphany" (Stargate Atlantis), a 2005 episode of Stargate Atlantis
- "Epiphany" (Desperate Housewives), a 2010 episode of Desperate Housewives
- "Epiphany", a 1989 episode of War of the Worlds
- "Epiphanies" (Babylon 5), a 1997 episode of Babylon 5
- "Epiphanies" (Battlestar Galactica), a 2006 episode of Battlestar Galactica
- "Epiphanies" (Spaced), a 1999 television episode
- Epiphany Johnson, a character on the American soap opera General Hospital
- Epiphany Proudfoot, a character in the film Angel Heart played by Lisa Bonet

== Music ==
=== Classical music ===
- Epifanie (Berio), a musical composition by the Italian composer Luciano Berio

=== Albums ===
- Epiphany: The Best of Chaka Khan, Vol. 1, 1996 compilation album by Chaka Khan
- Epiphany (T-Pain album), 2007 album by T-Pain
- Epiphany (Ian Villafana album), 2010 album by Ian Villafana
- Epiphany (Manafest album), 2005 album by Manafest
- Epiphany (Chrisette Michele album), 2009 album by R&B singer Chrisette Michele
- Epiphany (Judith Durham album), a 2011 album by Australian Judith Durham
- Epiphany (Kashdami album), a 2021 album by American rapper Kashdami

=== Songs ===
- "Epiphany" (Chrisette Michele song), 2009
- "Epiphany" (Taylor Swift song), 2020
- "Epiphany" (BTS song), 2018
- "Epiphany", a song by Bad Religion from their 2002 album The Process of Belief
- "Epiphany", a song by Bowling For Soup from their 2006 album The Great Burrito Extortion Case
- "Epiphany", a song by Intervals from their 2012 EP In Time
- "Epiphany", a song by Mammoth WVH from their 2021 eponymous debut album
- "Epiphany", a song by Mushroomhead from their 2001 album XX
- "Epiphany", a song by Staind from their 2001 album Break the Cycle
- "Epiphany", a song by The Ocean from their 2010 album Heliocentric
- "Epiphany", a song by Trans Siberian Orchestra from their 2010 album Night Castle
- "Epiphany", a song by The Word Alive from their 2010 album Deceiver
- "Epiphany", a song by Stephen Sondheim in his musical Sweeney Todd: The Demon Barber of Fleet Street
- "Epiphany", a song by Trent Reznor and Atticus Ross, from their score of Pixar's 2020 film Soul
- "Epiphany", a song on the film soundtrack Crank: High Voltage

== People ==
- Epiphany (wrestler), American professional wrestler
- Epiphanny Prince (born 1988), basketball player

== See also ==
- "The Feast of Epiphany", a 2008 episode of Brothers & Sisters
- Tiffany (given name)
- Epiphanes (disambiguation)
