= Epiphanes =

Epiphanes (Greek: Ἐπιφανής), meaning "Manifest" or "the Glorious/Illustrious", is an ancient Greek epithet borne by several Hellenistic rulers. It produced the Russian-language given name Yepifan/Epifan.

Notable people with the name include.

- Antiochus IV Epiphanes (c. 215–164 BC), ruler of the Seleucid Empire
- Alexander Balas, ruler of the Seleucid Empire from 150 BC to 145 BC, was called Epiphanes
- Antiochus XI Epiphanes (reigned 95–92 BC), ruler of the Seleucid Empire
- Ariarathes VI Epiphanes Philopator (reigned 130–116 BC), King of Cappadocia
- Ariarathes VIII Epiphanes (reigned 101–96 BC), King of Cappadocia
- Epiphanes (Gnostic), legendary Gnostic writer
- Gaius Julius Antiochus IV Epiphanes, the last king of Commagene who reigned between 38 and 72
- Gaius Julius Archelaus Antiochus Epiphanes (38–92), prince of the Kingdom of Commagene
- Seleucus VI Epiphanes (reigned 96–95 BC), ruler of the Seleucid Empire
- Plato Epiphanes, Greco-Bactrian king of the 2nd century BC
- Polyxenos Epiphanes Soter (ca. 100 BC), Indo-Greek ruler
- Ptolemy V Epiphanes (reigned 204–181 BC), ruler of the Ptolemaic dynasty
- Mithridates II of Parthia, king of the Parthian Empire
- Nicomedes II Epiphanes, king of Bithynia of the 2nd century BC

== Animals ==
- Epiphanes (rotifer), a genus of rotifer in the order Ploima.
- Hypermastus epiphanes, a sea snail in the family Eulimidae
- Inape epiphanes, a moth of the family Tortricidae
- Izatha epiphanes, a moth of the family Oecophoridae

== See also ==
- Inscription of Parthian imperial power
- Epiphane (disambiguation)
- Epiphanius (disambiguation)
- Epiphany (disambiguation)
