= Manifestation =

Manifestation may refer to:

== Religion ==
- Manifestation of conscience, a practice in religious orders
- Manifestation of God (Baháʼí Faith), the prophets of the Bahá'í Faith
- Manifestation (popular psychology), various pseudoscientific self-help strategies involving willing one's desires into reality
- Materialization (paranormal), also called manifestation, the creation or appearance of matter from unknown sources

== Music ==
- Manifestation (Malevolent Creation album), 2000
- Manifestation (Cloak of Altering album), 2015
- The Manifestation, a 2004 album by Six Organs of Admittance

== See also ==
- Epiphany (disambiguation)
- Theophany, the manifestation of a deity in an observable way
