= Bailey's blind snake =

Conservation status
- Vulnerable (IUCN 3.1)

Scientific classification
- Kingdom: Animalia
- Phylum: Chordata
- Class: Reptilia
- Order: Squamata
- Suborder: Serpentes
- Family: Leptotyphlopidae
- Genus: Trilepida
- Species: T. anthracina

Binomial name
- Trilepida anthracina Bailey, 1946

Synonyms
- Leptotyphlops anthracinus Bailey, 1946; Tricheilostoma anthracinum — Adalsteinsson et al., 2009; Trilepida anthracina — Hedges, 2011

Species of snake

Bailey's blind snake (Trilepida anthracina) is a species of snake in the family Leptotyphlopidae. The species is endemic to Ecuador.

== Geographic range ==
In Ecuador T. anthracina is found in Abituagua, Balzapamba, Baños de Agua Santa, and Zamora.

== Habitat ==
The preferred natural habitat of T. anthracina is forest, at altitudes of 1,000–1,800 m (3,300–5,900 ft).

== Description ==
Large and stout for its genus, T. anthracina may attain a total length (including tail) of 29 cm (11 in). Its coloration is uniformly black, both dorsally and ventrally.

== Behavior ==
T. anthracina is fossorial and sometimes diurnal.

== Diet ==
T. anthracina preys upon termites and insect larvae.

== Reproduction ==
T. anthracina is oviparous.
