= Recital I (for Cathy) =

1972 stage work by Luciano Berio

- by Luciano Berio
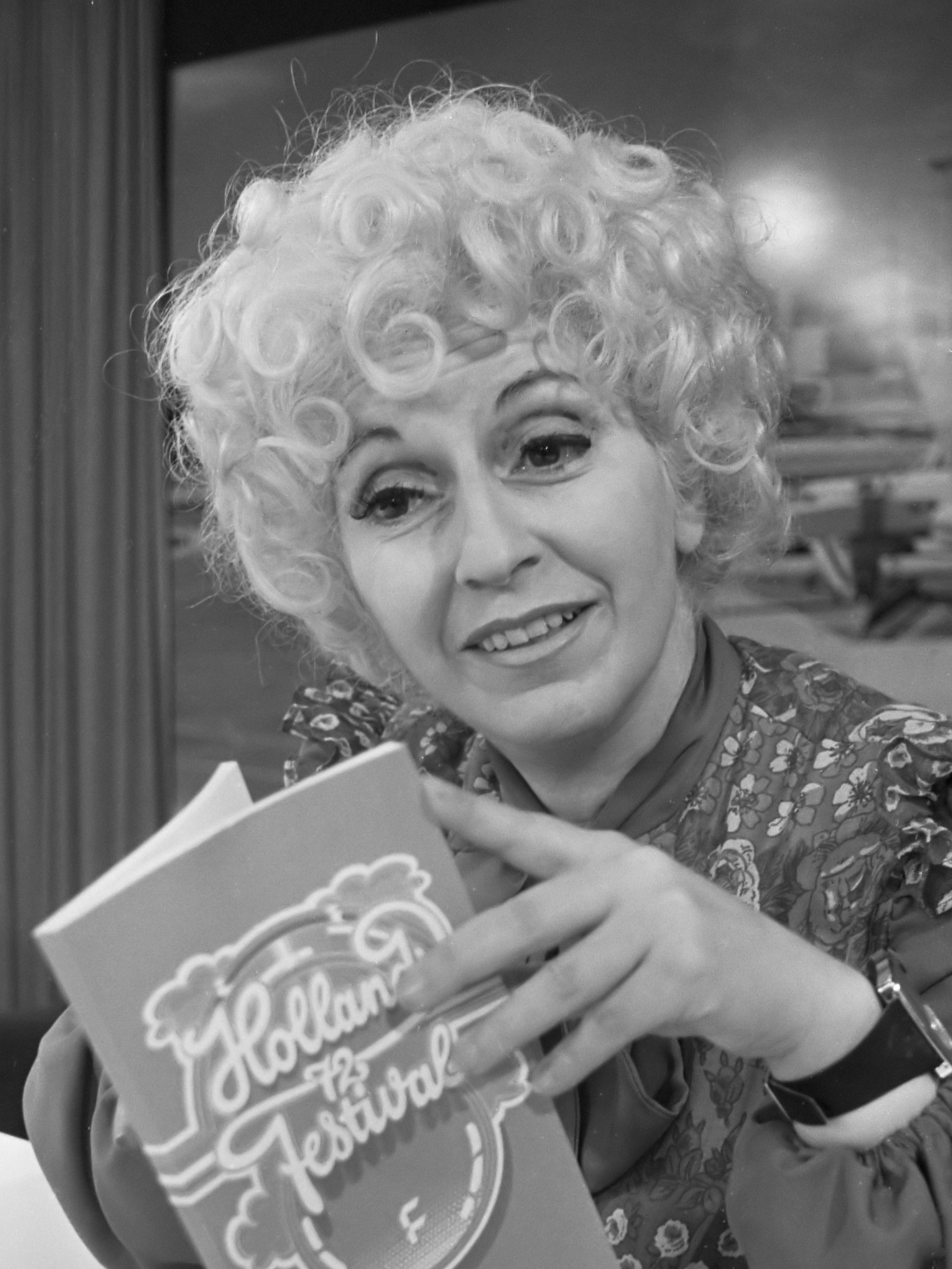
- Berberian in 1972
- Text: folk songs
- Composed: 1972
- Performed: 27 April 1972
- Scoring: voice; ensemble

Recital I (for Cathy) is a stage work by the Italian composer Luciano Berio. It was written for Cathy Berberian, with whom Berio was married from 1950 to 1964, and is scored for mezzo-soprano and 17 instruments. It was first performed on 27 April 1972 in Lisbon in the Calouste Gulbenkian Foundation Grand Auditórium by Cathy Berberian with Orquesta Gulbenkian, conducted by the composer.

== Synopsis ==
In the piece a singer—who is, in Berberian's description, not a singer who gives a recital but an actress-singer who plays the role of a singer who gives a recital (Vila 2003, p. 285)—enters the stage to find that the pianist who is to accompany her hasn't arrived. Accompanied by an off-stage harpsichord she starts her recital with a performance of Claudio Monteverdi's "Lettera amorosa" and "Lamento della ninfa" but stops to look for the pianist. She then begins a long spoken monologue that is interrupted by over forty, often very brief musical fragments taken from Berberian's repertoire, including works Berio had written for her voice in earlier years, Avendo gran disio and Epifanie. As the recital progresses the singer's descent into madness is emphasized by quotations from Hamlet, Pierrot Lunaire and the mad scenes from Gaetano Donizetti's Lucia di Lammermoor and Giacomo Meyerbeer's Dinorah (Metzer 2003, p. 93). She ends the piece with a prayer for liberation ("libera nos"), her vocal range reduced to a semitone.

== Quotations ==
In Quotation and Cultural Meaning in Twentieth-Century Music by David Metzer, the sources of the musical fragments quoted in Recital I (for Cathy) are identified as follows (Metzer 2003, pp. 219–220)—the track numbers and time indications refer to the only recording that exists of the piece (RCA 09026-62540-2, with Berberian and the London Sinfonietta conducted by Berio):

1. Claudio Monteverdi, "Lettera amorosa" (track 1)
2. Claudio Monteverdi, "Lamento della ninfa" (track 2)
3. Claudio Monteverdi, "Lettera amorosa" (track 4, 1:02)
4. Johann Sebastian Bach, "Ich nehme mein Leiden mit Freuden auf mich" from cantata Die Elenden sollen essen, BWV 75 (track 4, 1:25 and 1:37)
5. Liturgia Armenia (track 4, 1:47)
6. Johann Sebastian Bach, "Ich nehme mein Leiden mit Freuden auf mich" from cantata BWV 75 Die elenden sollen essen (track 4, 2:03)
7. Maurice Ravel, "Chanson épique" from Don Quichotte à Dulcinée (track 4, 2:42)
8. Henry Purcell, "Ye gentle spirits of the air" from The Fairy-Queen (track 4, 2:57)
9. Friedrich Hollaender, "Ich bin von Kopf bis Fuß auf Liebe eingestellt", as sung by Marlene Dietrich in the film Der blaue Engel (track 4, 3:44)
10. Manuel de Falla, "Polo" from Siete canciones populares españolas (track 4, 4:22)
11. Francis Poulenc, "Hôtel" from Banalités (track 4, 4:59)
12. Richard Wagner, "Träume" from the Wesendonck Lieder (track 4, 5:34)
13. Gustave Charpentier, "Quelle belle vie" from Louise (track 4, 5:49)
14. Hugo Wolf, "Das verlassene Mägdlein" (track 4, 6:10)
15. Darius Milhaud, "La séparation" from Chants populaires hébraïques (track 4, 6:45)
16. Henry Purcell, "When I am laid in earth" from Dido and Æneas (track 4, 6:57)
17. Igor Stravinsky, "At home" from the Cat's Cradle Songs (track 4, 7:22)
18. Jules Massenet, "Adieu, notre petite table" from Manon (track 4, 7:49)
19. Ernesto Berio, "Pioggerellina" (track 4, 8:28)
20. Luciano Berio, Epifanie (track 4, 8:48)
21. Luciano Berio, Avendo gran desio (track 5)
22. Leonard Bernstein, Lamentation from Jeremiah (track 6, 0:20)
23. Arnold Schoenberg, "Mondestrunken" from Pierrot Lunaire (track 6, 0:30)
24. Ambroise Thomas, Polonaise ("Je suis Titania") from Mignon (track 6, 0:41)
25. Georges Bizet, Recitative ("Je ne te parle pas") from Carmen (track 6, 0:46)
26. Armenian traditional song "Ax lele, vax lele" (track 6, 1:07)
27. Alfredo Casella, "Er gatto e er cane" (track 6, 1:24)
28. Maurice Ravel, "Placet futile" from Trois poèmes de Mallarmé (track 6, 1:28)
29. Franz Schubert, "Der Tod und das Mädchen" (track 6, 1:48)
30. Modest Mussorgsky, "Song of the Flea" (track 6, 2:01)
31. Giovanni Paisiello, "Nel cor più non mi sento" from La Molinara (track 6, 2:21)
32. Giuseppe Verdi, "Cortigiani, vil razza dannata" from Rigoletto (track 6, 2:57)
33. Gustav Mahler "Oft denk' ich, sie sind nur ausgegangen" from the Kindertotenlieder (track 8, 0:21)
34. Reynaldo Hahn, "L'heure exquise" (track 8, 0:47)
35. Léo Delibes, "Bell song" from Lakmé (track 8, 1:21 and 1:29)
36. Gioachino Rossini, "Non più mesta" from La cenerentola (track 8, 1:35 and 1:44)
37. Gaetano Donizetti, "Al fin son tua" from Lucia di Lammermoor (track 8, 2:18)
38. Georges Bizet, card scene from Carmen (track 8, 2:40)
39. Giacomo Meyerbeer, "Ombre légère qui suis mes pas" from Dinorah (track 8, 2:55)
40. Gaetano Donizetti, "O gioia che si sente" from Lucia di Lammermoor (track 8, 3:04)
41. Franz Schubert, "Der Jüngling an der Quelle" (track 8, 3:31)
42. Sergei Prokofiev, "Fields of the dead" from Alexander Nevsky (track 8, 4:14)
43. Giacomo Meyerbeer, "Ombre légère qui suis mes pas" from Dinorah (track 8, 5:03)
44. Luciano Berio, Lied (track 9)
