= Manifest =

Manifest may refer to:

== Computing ==
- Manifest file, a metadata file that enumerates files in a program or package
- Manifest (CLI), a metadata text file for CLI assemblies

== Events ==
- Manifest (convention), a defunct anime festival in Melbourne, Australia
- Manifest (urban arts festival), put on by Columbia College Chicago, in Illinois, US

== Film and television ==
- Manifest: The Chryzinium Era, a 2017 American short film
- Manifest (TV series), a 2018 American drama series
- "Manifest" (Luke Cage), a television episode

== Music ==
- Manifest (band), a Turkish girl group

=== Albums ===
- Manifest (Amaranthe album), 2020
- Manifest (Impaled Nazarene album), 2007
- Manifest (Linda Sundblad album), 2010
- Manifest!, by Friends, 2012
- Manifest, by Chessie, 2008

=== Songs ===
- "Manifest", by Andrew Bird from My Finest Work Yet, 2019
- "Manifest", by the Fugees from The Score, 1996
- "Manifest", by Gang Starr from No More Mr. Nice Guy, 1989
- "Manifest", by Kerber from Ljudi i bogovi, 1988
- "Manifest", by Sepultura from Chaos A.D., 1993
- "Manifest", by Starset from Divisions, 2019

== Other uses ==
- Manifest (transportation), a document listing the cargo, passengers, and crew of a vehicle
- Manifest, Louisiana, US, an unincorporated area
- Democracy Manifest, Queensland police incident
- Manifest Destiny, the concept that drove American Westward expansion

== See also ==
- Manafest, Canadian musician
- Manifesta, a European contemporary arts biennale
- Manifestation (disambiguation)
- Manifesto (disambiguation)
