= Manifiesto =

Manifiesto may refer to:

- Manifiesto (Nepal album)
- Manifiesto (Víctor Jara album)

== See also ==
- Manifesto (disambiguation)
