= San Miguel, Ecuador =

San Miguel, Ecuador may refer to:

- San Miguel, Bolívar, Bolívar Province
- San Miguel de Ibarra, Imbabura Province
- San Miguel de Salcedo, Cotopaxi Province
- San Miguel de los Bancos, Pichincha Province
- San Miguel de Cayapas, Esmeraldas Province
