= Manifesto (disambiguation) =

A manifesto is a public declaration of principles and intentions, often political in nature.

Manifesto may also refer to:

- Manifesto (horse)
- Il manifesto, an Italian newspaper
- Manifesto (art collective)

== Film and television ==
- Manifesto (1988 film)
- Manifesto (2015 film)
- Manifesto, working title of the US TV series Manhunt: Unabomber, about Ted Kaczynski

== Music ==
- Manifesto (band), an American rock band
- Manifesto Records
- Manifesto (music venue), Hoorn, the Netherlands

=== Albums ===
- Manifesto (Deadlock album), 2008
- Manifesto (Inspectah Deck album), 2010
- Manifesto (Pocket Full of Rocks album), 2007
- Manifesto (Roxy Music album), or the title song, 1979
- Manifesto, by The Souljazz Orchestra, 2008

=== Songs ===
- "Manifesto" (Superfly song), 2007
- "Manifesto", a song by the Cat Empire from The Cat Empire, 2003
- "Manafesto", a song by Manafest from Epiphany, 2005
- "Manifesto", a song by The City Harmonic, 2010
- "Manifesto", a song by Planningtorock from W, 2011
- "MANIFESTO", a song by Tyler, the Creator from Call Me If You Get Lost, 2021
- “The Manifesto”, a song by Gorillaz from The Mountain, 2025

== See also ==
- Manifest (disambiguation)
- Art manifesto, a recurrent feature associated with the avant-garde in Modernism
- 1890 Manifesto, a formal position regarding termination of practice of polygamy in the Church of Jesus Christ of Latter-Day Saints
- The Manifesto Group, an alliance of British Labour MPs in the 1970s
