= Inape papallactana =

Scientific classification
- Domain: Eukaryota
- Kingdom: Animalia
- Phylum: Arthropoda
- Class: Insecta
- Order: Lepidoptera
- Family: Tortricidae
- Genus: Inape
- Species: I. papallactana

Binomial name
- Inape papallactana Razowski, 1999

Species of moth

Inape papallactana is a species of moth of the family Tortricidae. It is found in Pichincha Province, Ecuador.
