= Inape arcuata =

Scientific classification
- Kingdom: Animalia
- Phylum: Arthropoda
- Class: Insecta
- Order: Lepidoptera
- Family: Tortricidae
- Genus: Inape
- Species: I. arcuata

Binomial name
- Inape arcuata Razowski & Wojtusiak, 2010

Species of moth

Inape arcuata is a species of moth of the family Tortricidae which is endemic to Peru.

The wingspan is 23 millimetres (0.91 in).
