= Elizabeth Laurence =

British opera singer

- Born: Elizabeth Jane Scott; 22 November 1949 (age 76); Harrogate, England
- Occupation: Classical mezzo-soprano
- Years active: From 1985

Elizabeth Laurence (born Elizabeth Jane Scott, 22 November 1949, Harrogate, England) is a classical mezzo-soprano singer. She is best known for her performances of 20th century operatic repertoire, and has created several operatic roles.

== Biography ==
Elizabeth Laurence studied at Trinity College of Music, London.

In 1986, Laurence performed Mallika (in Léo Delibes' Lakmé) in Montecarlo; concerts of Purcell's Dido and Aeneas (1983). Often invited to sing Jocasta (Stravinsky's Oedipus rex) in Madrid (1986, 1987, 2009) and Nancy (Britten's Albert Herring) for Glyndebourne Touring Company (1987), she created the role of Anna Arild in Nigel Osborne's opera The Electrification of the Soviet Union (1988, 1989) and Terrible Mouth (1992). In 1988, she made the BBC film of Bluebeard's Castle by Bartok in London, having performed it in Colmar, Alsace; she premiered this work in Tbilisi (1999) and Tokyo (1997), and during concerts in Festival St Riquier, France (1999).

In 1997 and 2001, Laurence played Geneviève in Debussy's Pelléas et Mélisande on tour in France with Amaury du Closel. She sang Izuko in Cavanna's Les Confessions impudiques in Nanterre and Strasbourg (1990/1992). In 1994 she sang in concert Les Épisodes d'une vie d'artiste by Jacques Banc in Rotterdam. In 1989, at the Paris Opéra, she created the part of Behemoth in York Höller's opera Der Meister und Margarita. She sang in the premiere of Luciano Berio's Un re in ascolto there in 1989, followed by Lulu by Alban Berg (1989, 1999, 2003,); Médée by R. Liebermann (2002) with Lavelli and J Conlon; she also sang in Der Rosenkavalier (Annina) and Die Frau ohne Schatten (Stimme von Oben, doubling Amme). In 1989, she made her Covent Garden debut as the mezzo-soprano in the British première of Luciano Berio's Un re in ascolto. In 1991 she created the part of Lady de Hautdesert in Harrison Birtwistle's opera Gawain. Asked to sing Flora in La traviata by Verdi in Marseille (1996), returning for Judith Symphony, by Jean Guillou and Salomé, by Richard Strauss. Later Falstaff (2004) England; Thomas Hamlet Queen Gertrude (2001). In 1997, she interpreted Die alte Frau in Wozzeck by Gurlitt in Rouen. Elizabeth Laurence sang la madre in Al gran sole carico d'amore by Luigi Nono (1999) with acclaim in Hamburg Staatsoper, also stepping in, in Henze's We come from the River (2001). In Frankfurt she was Contralto in Rihm's Die Eroberung von Mexico (2000/2001) and Ommou in Die Wande by Adriana Holszky (2000) Concert version: Erwartung also Cavalleria Rusticana by Monleone and Mascagni and Notre Dame by Schmidt with Layer and Armin Jordan, Montpellier; by Arnold Schoenberg (2001) Saarbrücken. At La Scala de Milan, Metz, Leeds and London, she sang the first performance in concerts of Le Visage nuptial by Pierre Boulez (1987) conducted by the composer; she was Erste Magd in Elektra (2005), Mother Marie in Dialogues des Carmelites by Francis Poulenc (2000/2004) and appeared in The Gambler by Prokofiev, filmed at Berlin State Opera (2008) under Daniel Barenboim's direction.

Her other operatic roles have included Cherubino (Mozart, Le nozze di Figaro), (1987, Châtelet) Erda (Wagner, Der Ring des Nibelungen), in Paris (1987), Fricka (1988); in Bonn (1990), Blumenmadchen in Parsifal (1987); filmed Judith (Béla Bartók, Bluebeard's Castle), 1988: Concepción, (Ravel, L'heure espagnole) filmed (1987); filmed in Brussels in Juditha Triuphans by Vivaldi (1989) and Carolina (Henze, Elegy for Young Lovers) (2005, 2007) in Ancona and Naples.

She has appeared several times at the BBC Proms. In 1986, she sang the solo part in the Proms premiere of Luciano Berio's Epifanie In 1987, she took the role of the Wood Dove in Schoenberg's Gurre-Lieder in a performance directed by Pierre Boulez. In 1988, she sang in Debussy's cantata La Damoiselle élue. This rarely performed work specifies two female soloists; Ann Murray had been scheduled to be one but was indisposed, so Laurence sang both parts at short notice. Invited to interpret Grimgerde in Wagner's act 3 of Die Walküre (2000). In 1992 sang Sechs Lieder, Op. 13, by Zemlinsky with Vienna Philharmonic; in 1989 premiered Elias's Five Poems by Irina Ratushinskaya R. F. Hall, London; sang Ligeti's Requiem in Belgium (1991), Frankfurt, televised (1993); Leucadeby Laurent Martin, premiered in Radio France (1996/2000), Paris. Much Mahler sung in Alsace (1982); Karlsruhe, Berlin (1990/1992) and Scotland (1992). Many concerts of Schoenberg: Pierrot lunaire (1980s/1990/1992) with Pierre Boulez, Simon Rattle. Opus 2 (1994): Charles Dutoit, Concertgebouw; Gurre-Lieder, L'EIC with Pierre Boulez (1987); in 1990 with Sir Charles Groves, and recitals of Das Buch der hängenden Gärten.

She has been described as having a "warm-toned, flexible voice and handsome appearance".

== Selected discography ==
- 1985 – Pierre Boulez, Le marteau sans maître; with Ensemble InterContemporain, directed by the composer; CBS Sony.
- 1987 – Pierre Boulez: La mélodie Contemporaine. L'EIC with Pierre Boulez. Cameras Continentales.
- 1988 – Schoenberg, Pierrot Lunaire; with Ensemble InterContemporain, directed by Pierre Boulez; BBC.
- 1989 – Pierre Boulez, Le visage nuptial; with Phyllis Bryn-Julson (soprano) and the BBC Symphony Orchestra, conducted by Pierre Boulez; Erato.
- 1989 – Luigi Nono, Guai ai gelidi nostri.
- 1990 – Stravinsky, The Nightingale; with the BBC Symphony Orchestra, directed by Pierre Boulez.
- 1994 – Ahmed Essyad, L'exercice de l'amour; Nouvel Orchestre Philharmonique de Radio France, conducted by B. Ferrandis; Erato.

== Selected filmography ==
- 1988 – Béla Bartók, Duke Bluebeard's Castle: Judith.
- 1988 – Nigel Osborne, The Electrification of the Soviet Union: Anna Arild.
- 1991 – Harrison Birtwistle, Gawain: Lady de Hautdesert.
- 1987 – L'heure espagnole Armin Jordan. Nouvel Philharmonic Orchestre de Radio France.
- 1999 – Al gran sole carico d'amore by Luigi Nono Staatsoper Frankfurt.
- 2002 – Médée Rolf Liebermann. Opéra de Paris.
- 2007 – Elegy for young lovers by Hans Werner Henze, Naples.
- 2008 – The Gambler by Prokofiev at La Scala and Berlin State Opera, conducted by Daniel Barenboim.
- 2017 – The Finding Mahogany Opera.
