= Venezuela blind snake =

Conservation status
- Data Deficient (IUCN 3.1)

Scientific classification
- Kingdom: Animalia
- Phylum: Chordata
- Class: Reptilia
- Order: Squamata
- Suborder: Serpentes
- Family: Leptotyphlopidae
- Genus: Trilepida
- Species: T. affinis

Binomial name
- Trilepida affinis (Boulenger, 1884)

Synonyms
- Leptotyphlops affinis

Species of snake

The Venezuela blind snake (Trilepida affinis) is a species of snake in the family Leptotyphlopidae.
