= Inape penai =

Scientific classification
- Domain: Eukaryota
- Kingdom: Animalia
- Phylum: Arthropoda
- Class: Insecta
- Order: Lepidoptera
- Family: Tortricidae
- Genus: Inape
- Species: I. penai

Binomial name
- Inape penai Razowski, 1988

Species of moth

Inape penai is a species of moth of the family Tortricidae and is endemic to Bolivia. The habitat consists of tropical cloud forests.
