= Inape eparmuncus =

Scientific classification
- Kingdom: Animalia
- Phylum: Arthropoda
- Class: Insecta
- Order: Lepidoptera
- Family: Tortricidae
- Genus: Inape
- Species: I. eparmuncus

Binomial name
- Inape eparmuncus Razowski & Pelz, 2006

Species of moth

Inape eparmuncus is a species of moth of the family Tortricidae. It is endemic to Ecuador (Zamora-Chinchipe Province).
