= Inape eltabloana =

Scientific classification
- Domain: Eukaryota
- Kingdom: Animalia
- Phylum: Arthropoda
- Class: Insecta
- Order: Lepidoptera
- Family: Tortricidae
- Genus: Inape
- Species: I. eltabloana

Binomial name
- Inape eltabloana Razowski & Wojtusiak, 2009

Species of moth

Inape eltabloana is a species of moth of the family Tortricidae. It is found in Ecuador (Tungurahua Province).

The wingspan is 24.5 millimetres (0.96 in).

== Etymology ==
The species name refers to El Tablon, the type locality.
