= Inape parastella =

Scientific classification
- Domain: Eukaryota
- Kingdom: Animalia
- Phylum: Arthropoda
- Class: Insecta
- Order: Lepidoptera
- Family: Tortricidae
- Genus: Inape
- Species: I. parastella

Binomial name
- Inape parastella Razowski & Wojtusiak, 2009

Species of moth

Inape parastella is a species of moth of the family Tortricidae. It is found in Ecuador (Carchi Province).

The wingspan is 21 millimetres (0.83 in).
