= Inape commoda =

Scientific classification
- Kingdom: Animalia
- Phylum: Arthropoda
- Class: Insecta
- Order: Lepidoptera
- Family: Tortricidae
- Genus: Inape
- Species: I. commoda

Binomial name
- Inape commoda Razowski & Pelz, 2006

Species of moth

Inape commoda is a species of moth of the family Tortricidae. It is found in Ecuador (Tungurahua and Napo Provinces).
