= Inape cinnamobrunnea =

Scientific classification
- Kingdom: Animalia
- Phylum: Arthropoda
- Class: Insecta
- Order: Lepidoptera
- Family: Tortricidae
- Genus: Inape
- Species: I. cinnamobrunnea

Binomial name
- Inape cinnamobrunnea Razowski & Pelz, 2006

Species of moth

Inape cinnamobrunnea is a species of moth of the family Tortricidae. It is found in Ecuador (Morona-Santiago Province, Tungurahua Province and Napo Province) and Peru.
