= Inape elegans =

Scientific classification
- Kingdom: Animalia
- Phylum: Arthropoda
- Class: Insecta
- Order: Lepidoptera
- Family: Tortricidae
- Genus: Inape
- Species: I. elegans

Binomial name
- Inape elegans Razowski & Pelz, 2006

Species of moth

Inape elegans is a species of moth of the family Tortricidae. It is found in Ecuador (Napo Province, Tungurahua Province and Morona-Santiago Province) and Peru.

The wingspan is 30–32 millimetres (1.2–1.3 in).
