= David Hewson =

British author of mystery novels

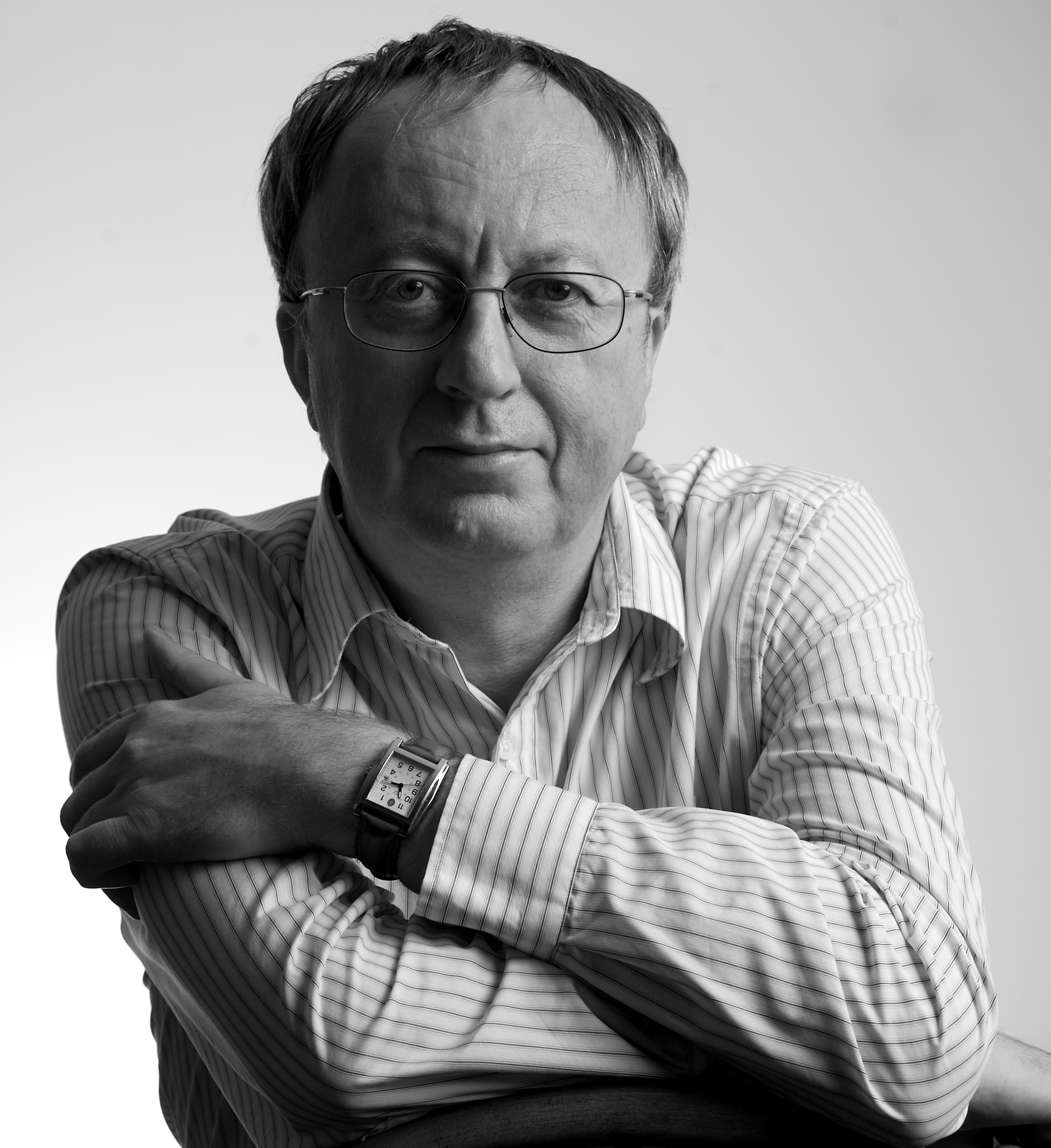
- Born: 9 January 1953 (age 73)
- Occupation: Novelist
- Writing career
- Period: 1985–present
- Genres: Crime, Mystery
- Website: www.davidhewson.com

David Hewson (born 9 January 1953) is a contemporary British author of mystery novels. His series of mysteries, featuring police officers In Rome, led by the young detective and art lover Nic Costa, began with A Season for the Dead, has now been contracted to run to at least nine instalments by British, American, European and Asian publishers. The author's debut novel, Shanghai Thunder, was published by Robert Hale, in the United Kingdom, in 1986. Almost all copies of the book were sent to libraries, and it has been reissued.

His second book was set in Spain during Holy Week and won the W H Smith Fresh Talent prize for one of the best first novels of 1996. Its film adaptation, released in 2002, was also titled Semana santa. Apart from that he has written a number of standalone novels, including Lucifer's Shadow and The Promised Land, and as well the second chapter of the audio serial novel The Chopin Manuscript started by Jeffery Deaver, with Lee Child and 13 other co-writers, for the audiobook site Audible.com.

Hewson wrote three novels, one based on each part of the tripartite Danish TV series The Killing. Alongside A. J. Hartley he wrote prose adaptations of William Shakespeare's plays Macbeth (released 2011) and Hamlet (released 2014) exclusively for Audible.com, and alone he wrote an adaptation of Romeo and Juliet, again exclusively for Audible. The three novels were narrated by Alan Cumming and Richard Armitage (who narrated both Hamlet and Romeo and Juliet), respectively.

Hewson left school at 17 and joined a local newspaper, the Scarborough Evening News, in the north of England. He was later a news, business and foreign reporter for The Times, and features editor of The Independent when it was launched in 1986. He served as a board member of International Thriller Writers Inc. for four years until 2009.

== Novels ==
- Shanghai Thunder (1986) ISBN 0-7090-2553-X
- Semana Santa (1995) ISBN 3-550-08239-8 (reissued as Death in Seville (2010) ISBN 978-0-330-51990-8)
- Epiphany (1997) ISBN 0-00-649706-3
- Solstice (1998) ISBN 0-446-52449-2
- Native Rites (1999) ISBN 0-00-651358-1
- Lucifer’s Shadow (revised edition re-entitled The Cemetery of Secrets) (2001) ISBN 0-385-33794-9
- The Promised Land (2007)
- Carnival for the Dead (2012) ISBN 978-0-230-75593-2
- The Killing: Book One (2012) ISBN 1447208412
- The Killing: Book Two (2013) ISBN 9781447208426
- The Killing: Book Three (2014) ISBN 9781447246237
- The Flood (2015) ISBN 9781847516251
- Juliet & Romeo (2018) ISBN 1999855906
- Devil's Fjord (2019) ISBN 9781780291123
- Shooter in the Shadows (2020) ISBN 9781838089719
- The Garden of Angels (2021) ISBN 9780727850119
- The Medici Murders (2022) ISBN 1448306566

Nic Costa series

- A Season for the Dead (2003) ISBN 0-385-33722-1
- The Villa of Mysteries (2004) ISBN 0-385-33772-8
- The Sacred Cut (2005) ISBN 0-385-33849-X
- The Lizard’s Bite (2006)
- The Seventh Sacrament (2007)
- The Garden of Evil (2008) Shortlisted for Theakston's Old Peculier Crime Novel of the Year Award 2009.
- Dante's Numbers (revised edition The Dante Killings in the US) (2008)
- The Blue Demon (City of Fear in the US) (2009)
- The Fallen Angel (2011) ISBN 978-0-230-52937-3
- The Savage Shore (2019)

Pieter Vos series

- The House of Dolls (2014) ISBN 978-1447246145
- The Wrong Girl (2015) ISBN 978-1447246183
- Little Sister (2016) ISBN 978-1447293392
- Sleep Baby Sleep (2017) ISBN 978-1447293439

== Anthologies ==
- The Chopin Manuscript (with Jeffery Deaver, Lee Child and others, Audible audio serial, 2007).

== Non-fiction ==
- Hewson, David (2007). Saved: how an English village fought for its survival ... and won. Matador. ISBN 978-1-905886-76-0. OCLC 123375748.

== Awards ==
In 2008, Hewson and narrator Saul Reichlin won the prize for best unabridged audiobook in the UK for The Seventh Sacrament. In 2009 the sixth Nic Costa novel, The Garden of Evil, won the American Library Association's best genre fiction reading list award for mystery.
