= Epiphany (novel) =

1996 novel by David Hewson

- First edition
- Author: David Hewson
- Language: English
- Genre: Crime, Mystery novel
- Publisher: HarperCollins
- Publication date: 1996
- Publication place: United Kingdom
- Media type: Print (Paperback))
- Preceded by: Semana Santa
- Followed by: Solstice

Epiphany is a 1996 mystery novel by British author David Hewson. The story delves between two linear timelines, one in the 1970s the other the 1990s, and explores elements of drugs, murder and quantum physical philosophy.

== Plot summary ==
Towards the end of the year 1975, five students have been visiting a deserted barn in the woods of San Francisco as a place to take drugs and have sex. On Christmas Eve, a young boy is abducted from his sister and parents and dismembered body parts are also found near the woods. The kidnapper and murderer is Michael Quinn, one of the students who now frequents the barn. He is strongly obsessed with LSD, quantum physics and the ideas of Schrödinger's cat, which he uses to justify his actions. Fellow student Hal Jamieson finds himself trying to get himself out of the police net that will inevitably close around them, and involves Paul Dunsany, a kind hearted musician who fails to realise the monstrous acts evolving around him. All escape but Quinn, who is incarcerated for 20 years for murder, kidnapping and ransom. The missing child is never found.

Towards the end of 1995, Paul Dunsany has grown up in Seattle, as professional musician and owner of a recording studio. He meets a mysterious woman by the name of Joni, who begins to probe him about his past. Hal Jamieson is a rich and successful software mogul, living also in Washington. He is married to Louise, one of the original five. Upon hearing of Quinn's release from prison, he decides to have Quinn taken into solitary 'care', for fear that he could incriminate the rest of them about what happened in early 1976.

As Jamieson tries his best to reunite the original five and use his wealth to take care of the situation, he finds Dunsany cannot remember much of what happened, and the fifth person, a girl by the name of Mouse, is of unknown whereabouts. There is also the problem of the inquisitive woman, looking for the answer to what happened to the missing child. Quinn is older now, and has contracted HIV. But he still possesses the view of the world he gained from LSD, and is still very dangerous. Wishing for freedom, he plans his escape from the woodland house Jamieson has him forced to live in.
