= Dugand's blind snake =

Conservation status
- Least Concern (IUCN 3.1)

Scientific classification
- Kingdom: Animalia
- Phylum: Chordata
- Order: Squamata
- Suborder: Serpentes
- Family: Leptotyphlopidae
- Genus: Trilepida
- Species: T. dugandi

Binomial name
- Trilepida dugandi Dunn, 1944

Synonyms
- Leptotyphlops dugandi Dunn, 1944; Tricheilostoma dugandi — Adalsteinsson et al., 2009; Trilepida dugandi — Hedges, 2011

Species of snake

Dugand's blind snake (Trilepida dugandi) is a species of snake in the family Leptotyphlopidae. The species is endemic to South America.

== Etymology ==
The specific name, dugandi, is in honor of Colombian naturalist Armando Dugand.

== Geographic range ==
T. dugandi is found in Atlántico Department, Colombia.

== Habitat ==
The preferred natural habitats of T. dugandi are forest and shrubland, at altitudes from sea level to 800 m (2,600 ft), but it has also been found in rural gardens.

== Description ==
Dorsally, T. dugandi is brown with seven dark copper stripes. Ventrally, it is cream-colored.

== Reproduction ==
T. dugandi is oviparous.
