= Inape tricornuta =

Scientific classification
- Domain: Eukaryota
- Kingdom: Animalia
- Phylum: Arthropoda
- Class: Insecta
- Order: Lepidoptera
- Family: Tortricidae
- Genus: Inape
- Species: I. tricornuta

Binomial name
- Inape tricornuta Razowski & Wojtusiak, 2008

Species of moth

Inape tricornuta is a species of moth of the family Tortricidae. It is found in Ecuador (Carchi Province).

The wingspan is 17 millimetres (0.67 in).
