= Inape =

Scientific classification
- Domain: Eukaryota
- Kingdom: Animalia
- Phylum: Arthropoda
- Class: Insecta
- Order: Lepidoptera
- Family: Tortricidae
- Tribe: Euliini
- Genus: Inape; Razowski, 1988

Species
- See text

Genus of tortrix moths

Inape is a genus of moths belonging to the family Tortricidae.

== Species ==
- Inape arcuata Razowski & Wojtusiak, 2010
- Inape asymmetra Razowski & Pelz, 2006
- Inape auxoplaca (Meyrick, 1926)
- Inape balzapamba Razowski & Wojtusiak, 2008
- Inape bicornis Razowski, 1999
- Inape biremis (Meyrick, 1926)
- Inape cateres Razowski & Pelz, 2006
- Inape celypha Razowski & Pelz, 2006
- Inape centrota Brown & Razowski, 2003
- Inape chara Razowski & Wojtusiak, 2008
- Inape cinnamobrunnea Razowski & Pelz, 2006
- Inape circumsetae Brown & Razowski, 2003
- Inape clarkeana Brown & Razowski, 2003
- Inape commoda Razowski & Pelz, 2006
- Inape elegans Razowski & Pelz, 2006
- Inape eltabloana Razowski & Wojtusiak, 2009
- Inape eparmuncus Razowski & Pelz, 2006
- Inape epiphanes Razowski & Pelz, 2006
- Inape extraria Razowski & Pelz, 2006
- Inape geoda Razowski & Pelz, 2006
- Inape homeotypa Razowski & Pelz, 2006
- Inape homologa Razowski & Pelz, 2006
- Inape homora Razowski & Pelz, 2006
- Inape iantha (Meyrick, 1912)
- Inape incarnata Razowski & Pelz, 2006
- Inape intermedia Razowski & Wojtusiak, 2010
- Inape laterosclera Razowski & Pelz, 2006
- Inape lojae Razowski & Wojtusiak, 2008
- Inape luteina Razowski & Pelz, 2006
- Inape papallactana Razowski, 1999
- Inape parastella Razowski & Wojtusiak, 2009
- Inape parelegans Razowski & Wojtusiak, 2009
- Inape penai Razowski, 1988
- Inape polysparta Razowski & Pelz, 2006
- Inape pompata Razowski & Pelz, 2006
- Inape porpax Razowski & Pelz, 2006
- Inape pseudocelypha Razowski & Pelz, 2006
- Inape reductana Brown & Razowski, 2003
- Inape rigidsocia Razowski & Wojtusiak, 2008
- Inape saetiphora Razowski & Wojtusiak, 2010
- Inape semuncus Razowski, 1997
- Inape sinuata Brown & Razowski, 2003
- Inape sororia Razowski & Pelz, 2006
- Inape stella Razowski & Wojtusiak, 2009
- Inape toledana Razowski & Wojtusiak, 2008
- Inape tricornuta Razowski & Wojtusiak, 2008
- Inape uncina Razowski & Pelz, 2006
- Inape xerophanes (Meyrick, 1909)
