= Inape clarkeana =

Scientific classification
- Domain: Eukaryota
- Kingdom: Animalia
- Phylum: Arthropoda
- Class: Insecta
- Order: Lepidoptera
- Family: Tortricidae
- Genus: Inape
- Species: I. clarkeana

Binomial name
- Inape clarkeana Brown & Razowski, 2003

Species of moth

Inape clarkeana is a species of moth of the family Tortricidae and is endemic to Colombia.

The wingspan is 11 millimetres (0.43 in).
