= Inape chara =

Scientific classification
- Kingdom: Animalia
- Phylum: Arthropoda
- Class: Insecta
- Order: Lepidoptera
- Family: Tortricidae
- Genus: Inape
- Species: I. chara

Binomial name
- Inape chara Razowski & Wojtusiak, 2008

Species of moth

Inape chara is a species of moth of the family Tortricidae. It is found in Ecuador (Pichincha Province).

The wingspan is 16.5 millimetres (0.65 in).
