= Inape bicornis =

Scientific classification
- Domain: Eukaryota
- Kingdom: Animalia
- Phylum: Arthropoda
- Class: Insecta
- Order: Lepidoptera
- Family: Tortricidae
- Genus: Inape
- Species: I. bicornis

Binomial name
- Inape bicornis Razowski, 1999

Species of moth

Inape bicornis is a species of moth of the family Tortricidae. It is found in Ecuador (Azuay Province).
