= Inape biremis =

Scientific classification
- Kingdom: Animalia
- Phylum: Arthropoda
- Class: Insecta
- Order: Lepidoptera
- Family: Tortricidae
- Genus: Inape
- Species: I. biremis

Binomial name
- Inape biremis (Meyrick, 1926)

Synonyms
- Eulia biremis Meyrick, 1926

Species of moth

Inape biremis is a species of moth of the family Tortricidae which is endemic to Colombia where it can be found on Nevado del Tolima.
