= Inape parelegans =

Scientific classification
- Domain: Eukaryota
- Kingdom: Animalia
- Phylum: Arthropoda
- Class: Insecta
- Order: Lepidoptera
- Family: Tortricidae
- Genus: Inape
- Species: I. parelegans

Binomial name
- Inape parelegans Razowski & Wojtusiak, 2009

Species of moth

Inape parelegans is a species of moth of the family Tortricidae. It is found in Ecuador (Morona-Santiago Province).

The wingspan is 25 millimetres (0.98 in).
