= Inape iantha =

Scientific classification
- Kingdom: Animalia
- Phylum: Arthropoda
- Class: Insecta
- Order: Lepidoptera
- Family: Tortricidae
- Genus: Inape
- Species: I. iantha

Binomial name
- Inape iantha (Meyrick, 1912)

Synonyms
- Cnephasia iantha Meyrick, 1912; Eulia iantha

Species of moth

Inape iantha is a species of moth of the family Tortricidae. It is found in Colombia and Ecuador.
