= Epiphane =

Epiphane may refer to:

- Epiphane P. Nadeau (December 27, 1879 – November 27, 1943), Canadian politician
- Joseph-Epiphane Darras (1825–1878), French church historian
- Saint-Épiphane, a municipality in Quebec, Canada
- Epiphane, character in Attentat (novel)
- Epiphane, fictional planet in the setup of Music of the Spheres (Coldplay album)
- Epiphane Ayi Mawussi, ambassador of Togo to the United States

== See also ==
- Epiphanes (disambiguation)
