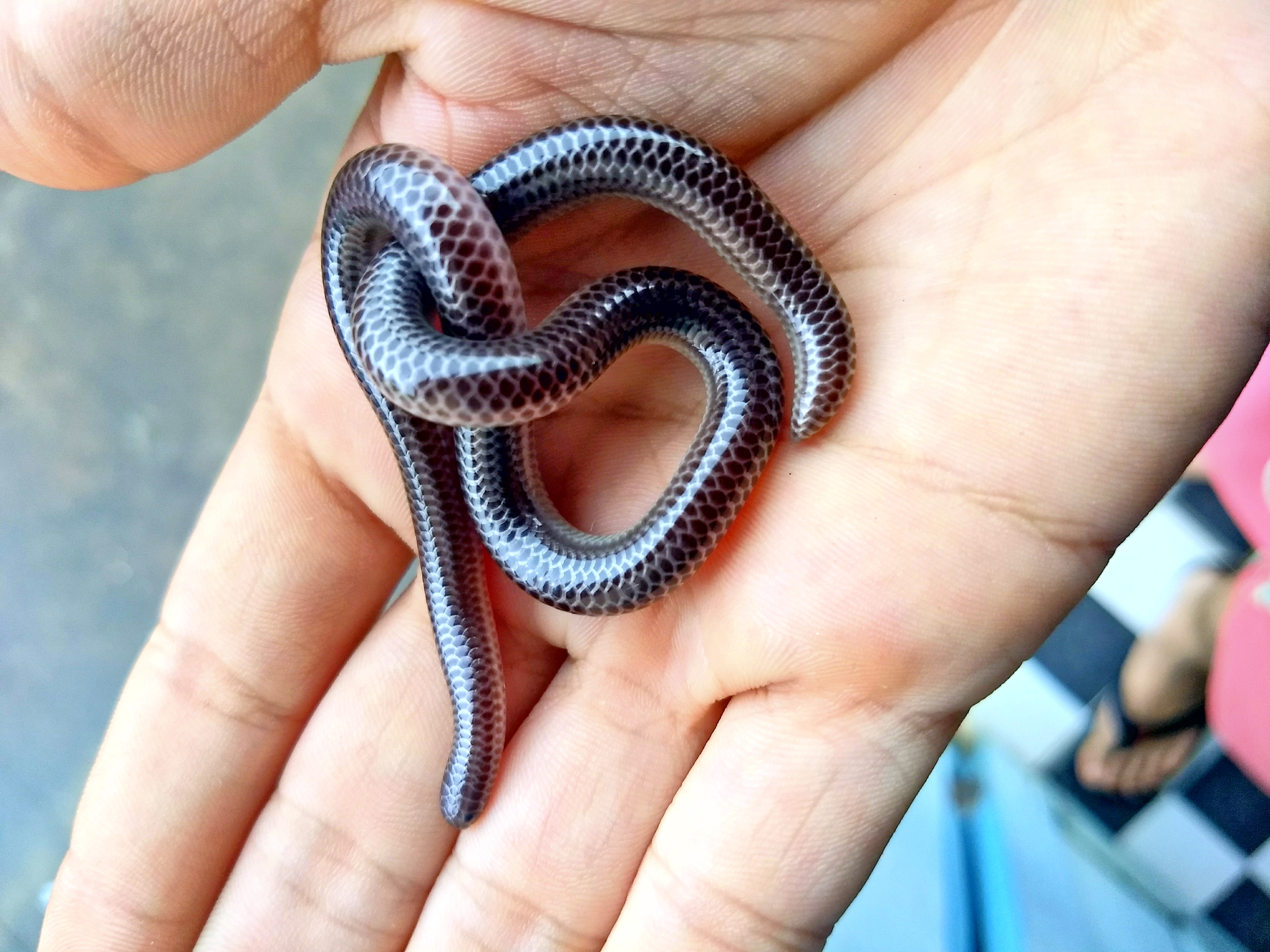
- Trilepida koppesi

Conservation status
- Least Concern (IUCN 3.1)

Scientific classification
- Kingdom: Animalia
- Phylum: Chordata
- Class: Reptilia
- Order: Squamata
- Suborder: Serpentes
- Family: Leptotyphlopidae
- Genus: Trilepida
- Species: T. koppesi

Binomial name
- Trilepida koppesi Amaral, 1955

Synonyms
- Leptotyphlops koppesi Amaral, 1955; Tricheilostoma koppesi — Adalsteinsson et al., 2009; Trilepida koppesi — Hedges, 2011

= Amaral's blind snake =

Species of snake

Amaral's blind snake (Trilepida koppesi), also known commonly as cobra-cega and cobra-de-chumbinho in Brazilian Portuguese, is a species of snake in the family Leptotyphlopidae. The species is native to South America.

== Etymology ==
The specific name, koppesi, is in honor of S.J. Koppes, who collected the holotype in 1934.

== Description ==
T. koppesi may attain a snout-to-vent length (SVL) of 34 cm (13 in).

== Geographic range ==
T. koppesi is endemic to Brazil, where it is found in the Distrito Federal and the Brazilian states of Bahia, Goiás, and Mato Grosso.

== Habitat ==
The preferred natural habitats of T. koppesi are grassland and savanna.

== Diet ==
T. koppesi preys upon ants (larvae, pupae, and adults), termite larvae, and beetles.

== Reproduction ==
T. koppesi is oviparous. Clutch size is five to seven eggs.
