= San Miguel Canton =

- Canton
- Location of Bolívar Province in Ecuador.

- San Miguel Canton in Bolívar Province
- Coordinates: 01°42′0″S 79°02′0″W
- Country: Ecuador
- Province: Bolívar Province
- Capital: San Miguel

Area
  - Total: 585.9 km^{2} (226.2 sq mi)

Population (2022 census)
  - Total: 28,349
  - Density: 48.39/km^{2} (125.3/sq mi)
- Time zone: UTC-5 (ECT)

San Miguel Canton is a canton of Ecuador, located in the Bolívar Province. Its capital is the town of San Miguel. Its population at the 2001 census was 26,747.

== Demographics ==
Ethnic groups as of the Ecuadorian census of 2010:

- Mestizo 90.9%
- Indigenous 5.2%
- White 2.7%
- Afro-Ecuadorian 0.8%
- Montubio 0.3%
- Other 0.1%

== Populated places ==
- Balzapamba
