= Inape semuncus =

Scientific classification
- Kingdom: Animalia
- Phylum: Arthropoda
- Class: Insecta
- Order: Lepidoptera
- Family: Tortricidae
- Genus: Inape
- Species: I. semuncus

Binomial name
- Inape semuncus Razowski, 1997

Species of moth

Inape semuncus is a species of moth of the family Tortricidae and is endemic to Peru.
