= Inape toledana =

Scientific classification
- Domain: Eukaryota
- Kingdom: Animalia
- Phylum: Arthropoda
- Class: Insecta
- Order: Lepidoptera
- Family: Tortricidae
- Genus: Inape
- Species: I. toledana

Binomial name
- Inape toledana Razowski & Wojtusiak, 2008

Synonyms
- Transtillaspis toledana

Species of moth

Inape toledana is a species of moth of the family Tortricidae. It is found in Ecuador (Loja Province and Morona Santiago Province).

The wingspan is 24 millimetres (0.94 in).

== Etymology ==
The species name refers to the type locality, Cerro Toledo.
