= Brazilian blind snake =

Scientific classification
- Kingdom: Animalia
- Phylum: Chordata
- Class: Reptilia
- Order: Squamata
- Suborder: Serpentes
- Family: Leptotyphlopidae
- Genus: Trilepida
- Species: T. brasiliensis

Binomial name
- Trilepida brasiliensis Laurent, 1949

Synonyms
- Leptotyphlops brasiliensis

Species of snake

The Brazilian blind snake (Trilepida brasiliensis) is a species of snake in the family Leptotyphlopidae.
