= Confession inscriptions of Lydia and Phrygia =

Religious steles from Anatolia

Confession inscriptions of Lydia and Phrygia are Roman-era Koine Greek religious steles from these historical regions of Anatolia (then part of Asia and Galatia provinces), dating mostly to the second and third centuries.

The new element that appears, the public confession of sin and the redemption through offerings (lytra), unknown to traditional Greek religion, has made scholars to name this social phenomenon as oriental. The religious thought and the use of vernacular Koine Greek, full of innovative orthography, syntax and grammar, suggests that they may also represent something at the root of religion in Phrygia and Lydia. Marijana Ricl has argued that the practice of confession is a reminiscence of Hittite religion. According to Schnabel E.J it was a counter-move prompted by the increasing success of the Christian missionaries. Indeed, beside the scheme of confession and redemption, the phraseology and terms are reminiscent of Greek New Testament: hamartia (sin), parakletos (advocate), doulos tou theou (servant of God), kyrios (master), basileus (king). Another point for discussion is the punishment of sexual transgressions, which further relates the inscriptions to Christianity and the concept of chastity in Hellenistic philosophy and religion, in contrast to the previous perception of sexuality inside the religion (Hieros gamos, Sacred prostitution, Aphrodite Pandemos).

Some indicating names or epithets of deities engaged in the inscriptions are: Mēn (Axiottenos, Artemidoros), Meter (mother), Zeus (Aithrios, Keraunios, Soter), Apollo, Hypsistos, Anahita, Attis, Dionysus, Hades, Heracles, Sabazios, Batenos, Nemesis, Asclepius, Tyrannos, Basileus, Theos Strapton and Bronton, Hecate, and Artemis.

== Inscriptions ==
=== Ritual dialogue of Theodoros with the Gods (Lydia, 235/236 AD) ===
Koine Greek original text

ἔτους τκʹ, μηνὸς Πανήμου βιʹ
κατὰ τὸ ἐφρενωθεὶς ὑπὸ τῶν
{²crescent, a pair of eyes}² θεῶν ὑπὸ τοῦ
Διὸς κὲ τοῦ Μηνὸς μεγάλου Ἀρτεμιδώρου·
ἐκολασόμην τὰ ὄματα τὸν Θεόδωρον
κατὰ τὰς ἁμαρτίας, ἃς ἐπύησεν·συνεγενόμην
τῇ πεδίσχῃ τοῦ Ἁπλοκόμα,τῇ Τροφίμῃ,
τῇ γυναικὶ τῇ Εὐτύχηδος εἰς τὸ πλετώριν·
ἀπαίρι τὴν πρώτην ἁμαρτίαν προβάτῳ,
πέρδεικι, ἀσφάλακι· δευτέρα ἁμαρτία·
ἀλλὰ δοῦλος ὢν τῶν θεῶν τῶν
ἐν Νονου συνεγενόμην τῇ Ἀριάγνῃ τῇ
μοναυλίᾳ· ’παίρι χύρῳ, θείννῳ ἐχθύει· τῇ τρίτῇ
ἁμαρτίᾳ συνεγενόμην Ἀρεθούσῃ μοναυλίᾳ·
’παίρι ὄρνειθει, στρουθῷ, περιστερᾷ,
κύ(πρῳ) κρειθοπύρων, πρόχῳ οἴνου· κύπρον πυρῶν
καθαρὸς τοῖς εἱεροῖς, πρόχον αʹ· ἔσχα παράκλητον
τὸν Δείαν· "εἴδαι, κατὰ τὰ πυήματα πεπηρώκιν,
νῦν δὲ εἱλαζομένου αὐτοῦ τοὺς θεοὺς κὲ στηλογραφοῦντος
ἀνερύσετον τὰς ἁμαρτίας"· ἠρωτημαίνος ὑπὸ τῆς συνκλήτου·
"εἵλεος εἶμαι ἀναστανομένης τῆς στήλλην μου,
ᾗ ἡμέρᾳ ὥρισα· ἀνύξαις τὴν φυλακήν, ἐξαφίω
τὸν κατάδικον διὰ ἐνιαυτοῦ κὲ μηνῶν ιʹ περιπατούντων

Translation
- THEODOROS: In the year 320, on the 12th of the month Panemos
  , because I have been brought to my senses by the gods,
  by Zeus and Men the Great Artemidoros
  (I set up this stele or I offer these pair of eyes)
- GOD: I punished Theodoros on his eyes for the sins he committed.
- THEODOROS: I had sex with Trophime, the slave of Haplokomas,
  wife of Eutyches in the courtyard
- GOD: He takes the first sin away with a sheep, partridge and mole
- THEODOROS: Second sin. Although I was a slave of the gods at Nonos,
  I had sex with Ariagne, the monaulia (virgin priestess).
- GOD: He takes away with a piglet and tuna.
- THEODOROS: Third sin. I had sex with Arethusa, the monaulia.
- GOD: He takes aways with a chicken, sparrow, pigeon,
  a kypros of barley and wheat, a chamber-pot (prochos) of wine,
  a kypros of clean wheat for the priests, one prochos.
- THEODOROS: I ask for Zeus's help (verbatim I have Zeus intercessor, paraclete)
- ZEUS: Look! I have blinded him for his sins. But since he has appeased the gods
  and written down his sins on this stele, he takes salvation.
  Asked by the senate, I am merciful because my stele was erected on the day I appointed.
  You may open the jail, I set the convict free, a year and ten months passing.

According to George Petzl, a trial of sacred theatre did take place in the sanctuary; Theodoros was convicted and jailed. Zeus was impersonated by a priest. According to Ender Varinlioglu, phylake (jail) is used metaphorically. Blindness was the jail or punishment upon Theodoros in order to be saved from his licentious sexual activities.

=== Soterchos of Motella (Phrygia, 3rd century AD) ===
Koine Greek original text

Αὐρήλιος Σωτήρχος Δημοστράτου Μοτεληνός
κολάθιν ἑπὸ τοῦ θεοῦ· παραγέλων πᾶσι
μηδὲ ἄναγον ἀναβῆτε πὶ τὸ χωρίον
ἐπροκήσι ἢ κηνσετε τὸν ὄρχις·
ἐγὼ Γέα ἐκηνησάμην ἐπὶ τὸ χωρίον.

Translation

Aurelios Soterchos son of Demostratos from Motella
Because I was punished by the God, I send a message to all·
Do not enter the place impure, after committing perjury or having sex.
I had sex with Gea (Gaia) inside the place.
