= Joshua's blind snake =

Conservation status
- Least Concern (IUCN 3.1)

Scientific classification
- Kingdom: Animalia
- Phylum: Chordata
- Order: Squamata
- Suborder: Serpentes
- Family: Leptotyphlopidae
- Genus: Trilepida
- Species: T. joshuai

Binomial name
- Trilepida joshuai (Dunn, 1944)

Synonyms
- Leptotyphlops joshuai Dunn, 1944; Tricheilostoma joshuai — Adalsteinsson et al., 2009; Trilepida joshuai — Hedges, 2011

Species of snake

Joshua's blind snake (Trilepida joshuai) is a species of snake in the family Leptotyphlopidae. The species is endemic to Colombia.

== Etymology ==
The specific name, joshuai, is a reference to Joshua, victor at the Battle of Jericho, in reference to the type locality, Jericó, Antioquia, Colombia.

== Geographic range ==
T. joshuai is found in the Colombian departments of Antioquia, Caldas, and Valle del Cauca.

== Habitat ==
The preferred natural habitat of T. joshuai is forest, at altitudes of 1,600–2,200 m (5,200–7,200 ft), but it has also been found in urban areas.

== Description ==
T. joshuai is black dorsally, and white ventrally. The total length (including tail) of the holotype is 27 cm (11 in).

== Behavior ==
T. joshuai is terrestrial and fossorial.

== Diet ==
T. joshuai preys upon insect larvae and termites.

== Reproduction ==
T. joshuai is oviparous.
