= Inape xerophanes =

Scientific classification
- Kingdom: Animalia
- Phylum: Arthropoda
- Class: Insecta
- Order: Lepidoptera
- Family: Tortricidae
- Genus: Inape
- Species: I. xerophanes

Binomial name
- Inape xerophanes (Meyrick, 1909)

Synonyms
- Tortrix xerophanes Meyrick, 1909

Species of moth

Inape xerophanes is a species of moth of the family Tortricidae and is endemic to Peru.
