= Inape sororia =

Scientific classification
- Kingdom: Animalia
- Phylum: Arthropoda
- Class: Insecta
- Order: Lepidoptera
- Family: Tortricidae
- Genus: Inape
- Species: I. sororia

Binomial name
- Inape sororia Razowski & Pelz, 2006

Species of moth

Inape sororia is a species of moth of the family Tortricidae. It is found in Ecuador.

== Subspecies ==
- Inape sororia sororia (Ecuador: Napo Province, Morona Santiago Province)
- Inape sororia corryssa Razowski & Pelz, 2006 (Ecuador: Azuay Province)
- Inape sororia lojana Razowski & Pelz, 2006 (Ecuador: Loja Province)
