= Yepifan (name) =

Yepifan/Epifan is a Russian given name derived from the Greek epithet Epiphanes (Greek: Ἐπιφανής). Notable people with the name include:

- Yepifan Kovtyukh, Soviet Ukrainian military commander
- Yepifan Nagayev (1914–1944), World War II Hero of the Soviet Union
