= Balzapamba =

- Location within Ecuador
- Coordinates: 1.7676064°S 79.1834557°W
- Country: Ecuador
- Province: Bolívar Province
- Canton: San Miguel
- Time zone: ECT
  - Summer (DST): UTC-5 (UTC)
- Postal Code: 020551

Balzapamba is a location in San Miguel Canton, Bolívar Province, Ecuador. The Inape balzapamba moth is named for this area.
