= Espírito Santo blind snake =

Conservation status
- Least Concern (IUCN 3.1)

Scientific classification
- Kingdom: Animalia
- Phylum: Chordata
- Class: Reptilia
- Order: Squamata
- Suborder: Serpentes
- Family: Leptotyphlopidae
- Genus: Trilepida
- Species: T. salgueiroi

Binomial name
- Trilepida salgueiroi Amaral, 1955

Synonyms
- Leptotyphlops salgueiroi Amaral, 1955; Tricheilostoma salgueiroi — Adalsteinsson et al., 2009; Trilepida salgueiroi — Hedges, 2011

Species of snake

The Espírito Santo blind snake (Trilepida salgueiroi) is a species of snake in the family Leptotyphlopidae. The species is endemic to Brazil.

== Etymology ==
The specific name, salgueiroi, is in honor of W.S. Salgueiro who collected the holotype.

== Geographic range ==
T. salgueiroi is found in the Brazilian states of Bahia, Espírito Santo, Minas Gerais, and Rio de Janeiro.

== Habitat ==
The preferred natural habitats of T. salgueiroi are forest and shrubland.

== Description ==
Dorsally, T. salgueiroi is uniform dark brown. Ventrally, it is light brown, with a reticulate pattern formed by white scale edges.

== Reproduction ==
T. salgueiroi is oviparous.
