= Inape auxoplaca =

Scientific classification
- Kingdom: Animalia
- Phylum: Arthropoda
- Class: Insecta
- Order: Lepidoptera
- Family: Tortricidae
- Genus: Inape
- Species: I. auxoplaca

Binomial name
- Inape auxoplaca (Meyrick, 1926)

Synonyms
- Eulia auxoplaca Meyrick, 1926

Species of moth

Inape auxoplaca is a species of moth of the family Tortricidae and is endemic to Colombia.
