= Confession (religion) =

Acknowledgment of one's sins

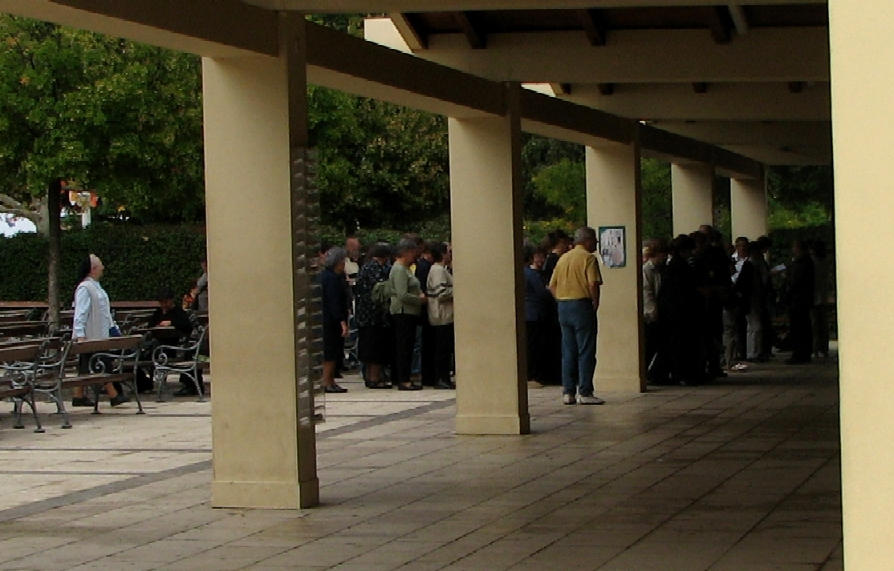
Pilgrims queueing to confess at Međugorje, Bosnia and Herzegovina (2007)

Confession, in many religions, is the acknowledgment of sinful thoughts and actions. This is performed privately to a deity or to a religious authority or congregation. It is often seen as a required action of repentance and a necessary precursor to penance and atonement. It often leads to reconciliation and forgiveness. In Christianity, practices vary widely by denomination: Roman Catholics confess to a priest in a formal sacrament; Eastern Orthodox Christians confess to a spiritual father; Lutherans and Anglicans observe both private and corporate forms; while Reformed and Methodist traditions emphasize communal confession in worship. In Islam, sins are confessed directly to God through prayer, without any intermediary. Judaism incorporates communal confession on holy days such as Yom Kippur, as well as private confession to those one has wronged. In Hinduism, confession forms part of Prāyaścitta, a broader practice of penance and atonement. Confession also appears in secular contexts, such as the Twelve-Step Program of Alcoholics Anonymous.

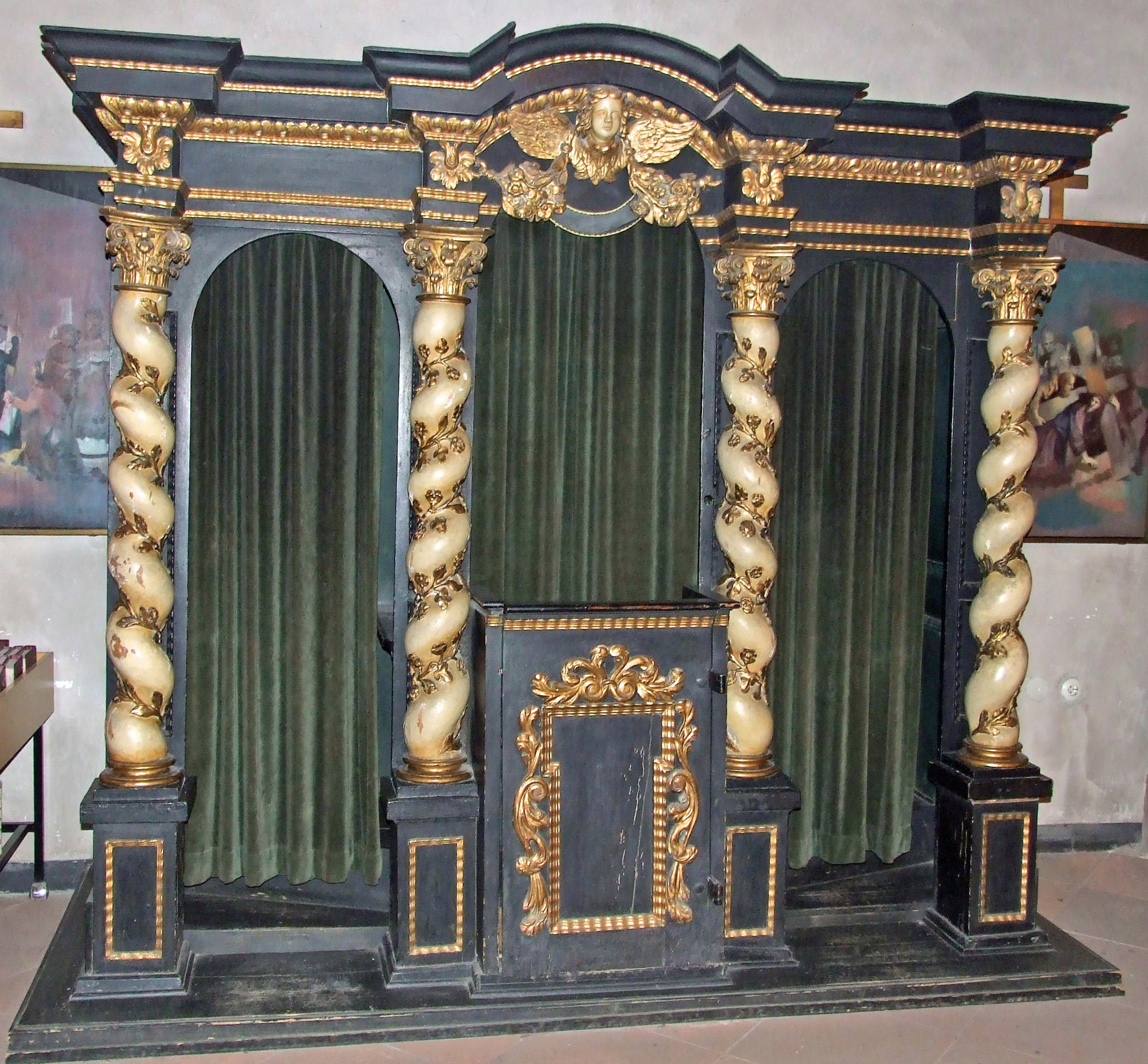
In Catholic settings, the traditional style of confessional allows the priest, seated in the center, to hear from penitents on alternating sides.

Despite their differences, most traditions share a common understanding of confession as a path toward spiritual healing, restored relationships, and moral accountability.

== Christianity ==
=== Latin Catholicism ===
In Catholic Church teaching, the Sacrament of Penance is the method by which individuals confess any sins they have committed after their baptism; these sins are then absolved by God through the administration of a priest, who assigns an act of penance. To validly receive absolution, the penitent must make a sincere sacramental confession of all known mortal sins not yet confessed to a priest and pray an act of contrition (a genre of prayers) that expresses both motives for sorrow and the resolve not to sin again.

Known by many names throughout the Latin Church, including penance, reconciliation, and confession, the sacrament is obligatory at least once a year for serious sins and is usually conducted within a confessional box, booth, or reconciliation room. While official Church publications usually refer to the sacrament as "penance", "reconciliation", or "penance and reconciliation", many clergy and laypeople continue to use the term "confession" when referring to the sacrament.

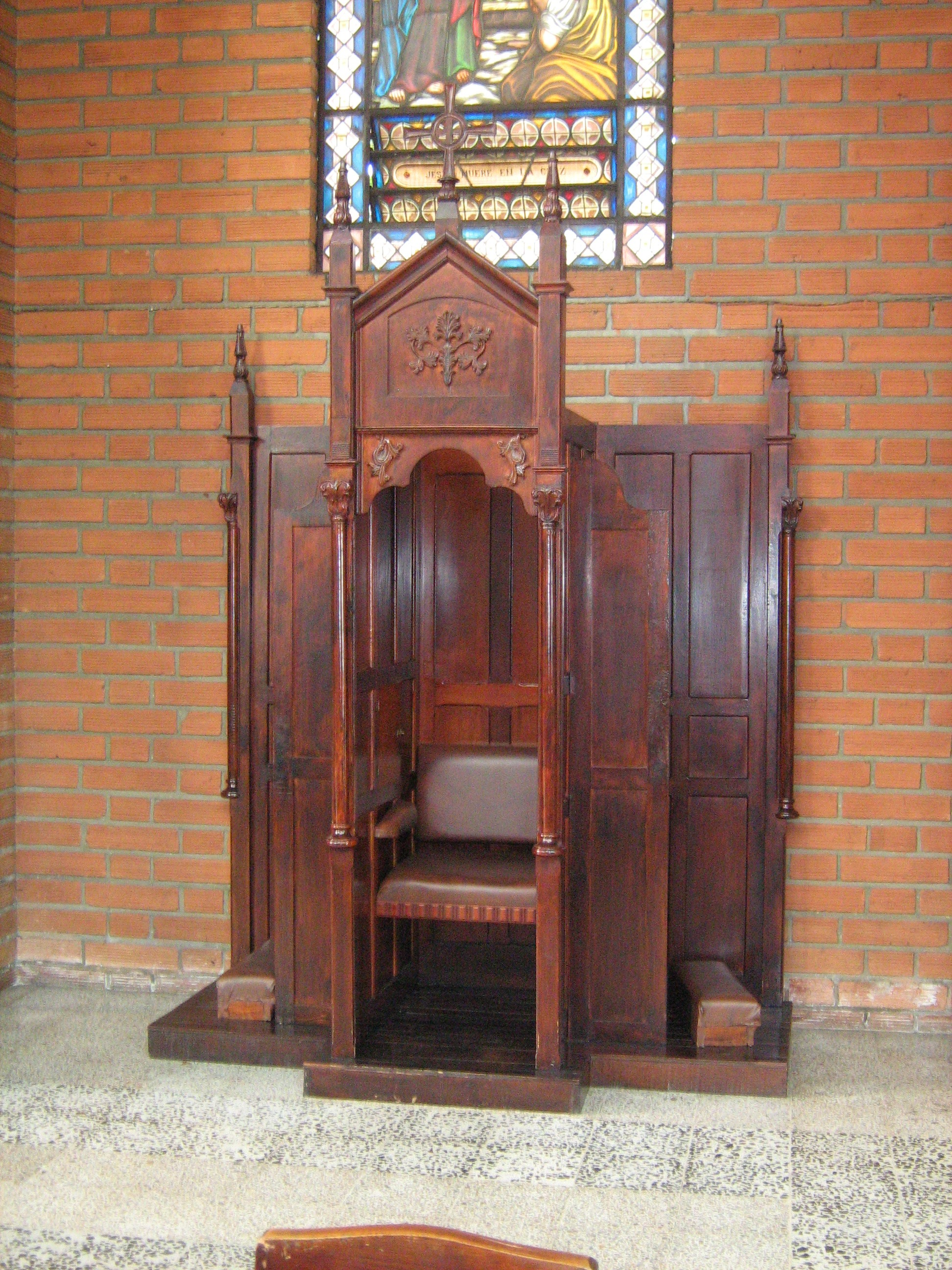
A confessional in Colombia

For the Catholic Church, the sacrament intends to provide healing for the soul as well as to regain the grace of God, lost by sin. In Catholic teaching, a perfect act of contrition – where the penitent expresses sorrow for having offended God and not out of fear of eternal punishment – removes the eternal punishment associated with mortal sin, even outside of confession. However, Catholics must confess their mortal sins within confession at the earliest opportunity. In theological terms, the priest acts in persona Christi and receives from the Church the power of jurisdiction over the penitent. The Council of Trent (Session Fourteen, Chapter I) quoted John 20:22–23 as the primary Scriptural proof for the doctrine concerning the sacrament. Catholics also consider Matthew 18:18, describing the power to "bind" and to "loose", to be among the Scriptural bases for the sacrament.

The Catholic Church teaches that sacramental confession requires three "acts" on the part of the penitent: contrition (sorrow of the soul for the sins committed), disclosure of the sins (the 'confession'), and satisfaction (the 'penance'; i.e., doing something to make amends for the sins). The basic form of confession has not changed for centuries, although at one time, confessions were made publicly. The concept of confessing in private is called sub rosa, which comes from Hellenistic and later Roman mythology and was eventually adopted into Christian symbolism.

Typically, the penitent begins sacramental confession by saying, "Bless me, Father, for I have sinned. It has been [time period] since my last confession." The penitent must then confess what they believe to be grave and mortal sins, in both kind and number, to be reconciled with God and the Church. The sinner may also confess venial sins; this is especially recommended if the penitent has no mortal sins to confess. According to the Catechism, "without being strictly necessary, confession of everyday faults (venial sins) is nevertheless strongly recommended by the Church. Indeed, the regular confession of our venial sins helps us form our conscience, fight against evil tendencies, let ourselves be healed by Christ, and progress in the life of the Spirit." "When Christ's faithful strive to confess all the sins they can remember, they undoubtedly place all of them before the divine mercy for pardon."

The Catholic Church teaches, based on the Parable of the Prodigal Son, that confession is not a tribunal or criminal court, where one is condemned by God like a criminal, but a "wedding banquet hall, where the community celebrates Easter, Christ's victory over sin and death, in the joyful experience of his forgiving mercy." In confession, the church believes God judges a person in the sense of bringing to light their sins by granting the person the ability to confess their sins to the confessor, then grants the person repentance and, through the confessor, grants the person forgiveness. God's forgiveness restores the person to "the brightness of the white robe of baptism, a garment specifically required to participate in the [wedding] feast."

Although parishes may schedule times for confession, the availability of Catholic priests to respond "whenever the sacrament is reasonably sought by the faithful" is held to be a reflection of the way "they are united with the intention and love of Christ when they administer the sacraments".

In Catholicism, it is considered the duty of priests not to reveal anything learned during the Sacrament of Penance; this protection against disclosure is known as the Seal of Confession.

=== Eastern Orthodoxy, Oriental Orthodoxy, and Eastern Rite Catholicism ===
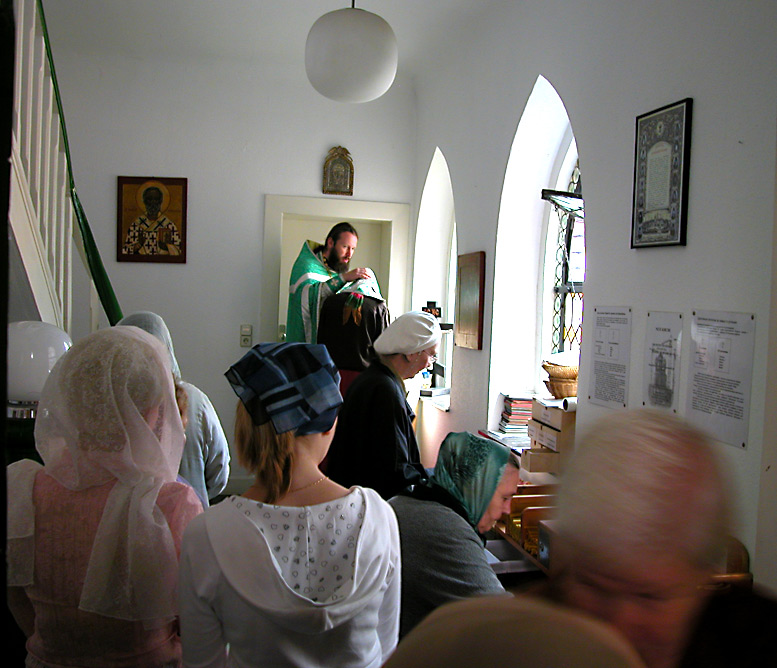
Russian Orthodox priest hearing confessions before Divine Liturgy, Church of the Protection of the Theotokos, Düsseldorf, Germany.

Orthodox Christians as well as members of the Assyrian Church of the East and Eastern Rite Catholics choose an individual to trust as their earthly guide to help them grow in Christ. In most cases, this is the parish priest, but may also be a starets (Elder, a monastic who is well known for their advancement in the spiritual life). This person is often referred to as one's "spiritual father". Once chosen, the individual turns to their spiritual guide for advice on their spiritual development, confessing sins, and asking advice. Orthodox Christians tend to formally confess only to this individual, with their spiritual guide assisting them with their growth in Christ and through Theosis. The bond between an Orthodox Christian and their spiritual father is so deep that no legal official can override a spiritual guide in criminal cases. What is confessed to one's spiritual guide is protected by the same seal as would be any priest hearing a confession. Only an ordained priest may pronounce the absolution.

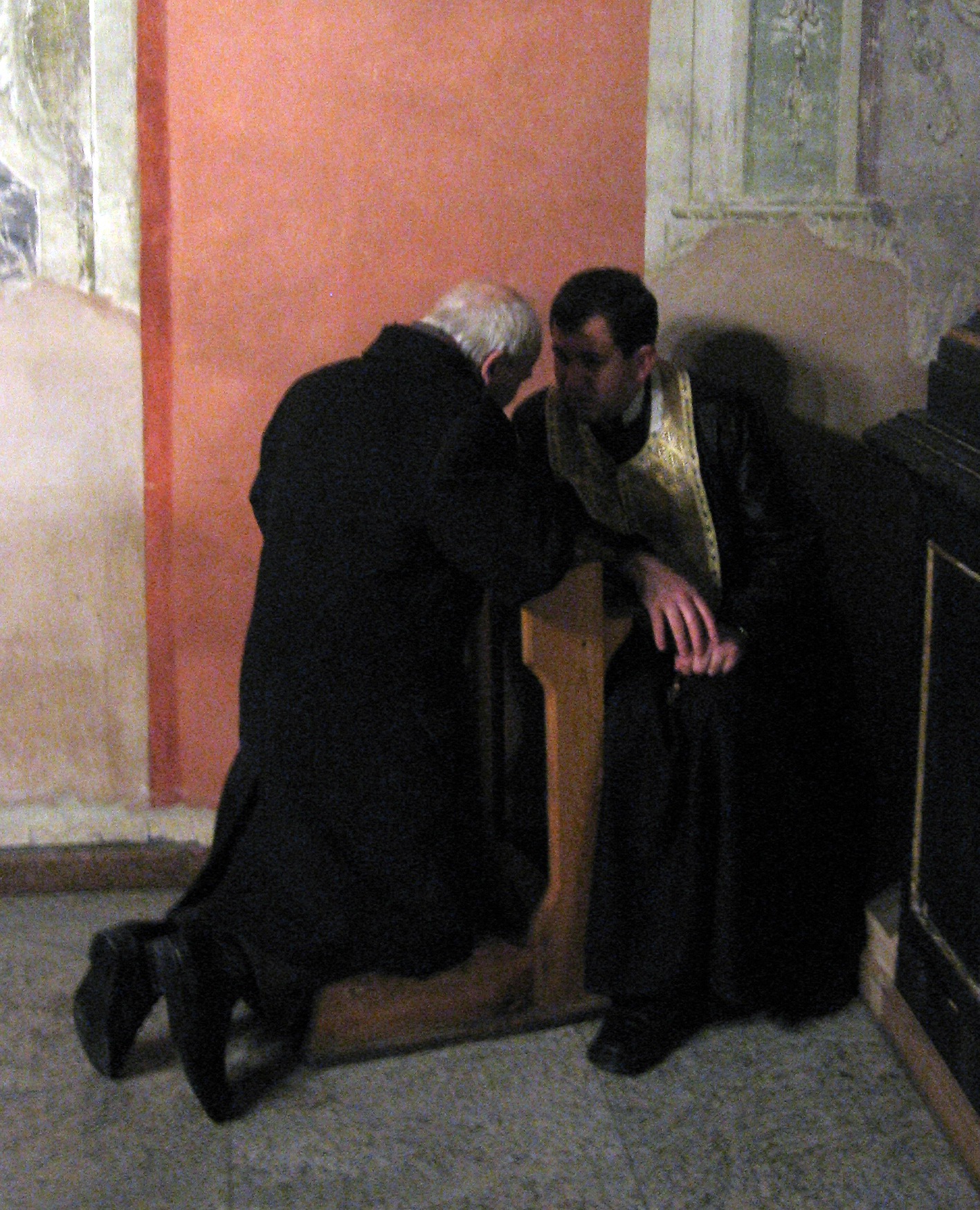
A penitent confessing his sins

Confession does not take place in a confessional, but normally in the main part of the church itself, usually before an analogion (lectern) set up near the iconostasion. On the analogion is placed a Gospel Book and a blessing cross. The confession often takes place before an icon of Jesus Christ. Orthodox Christians understand that during Confession, forgiveness is not bestowed by the priest, but by Christ. The priest stands only as a witness and vessel to be used by God. Before confessing, the penitent venerates the Gospel Book and blessing cross and places the thumb and first two fingers of his right hand on the feet of Christ as depicted on the cross. The confessor will often read an admonition warning the penitent to make a full confession, holding nothing back.

As with administration of other sacraments, in cases of emergency confession may be heard anywhere. For this reason, especially in the Russian Orthodox Church, the pectoral cross that the priest wears at all times will often have the Icon of Christ "Not Made by Hands" inscribed on it so that such an icon will be available to penitents who are experiencing imminent death or life-threatening danger in the presence of a priest but away from a church.

In general practice, after one confesses to one's spiritual guide, the parish priest (who may or may not have heard the confession) covers the head of the person with his Epitrachelion (Stole) and reads the Prayer of Absolution, asking God to forgive the transgression of the individual (the specific prayer differs between Greek and Slavic use). It is not uncommon for a person to confess their sins to their spiritual guide on a regular basis but only seek out the priest to read the prayer before receiving Holy Communion.

In the Eastern Churches, clergy often make their confession in the sanctuary. A bishop, priest, or deacon will confess at the Holy Table (Altar) where the Gospel Book and blessing cross are normally kept. He confesses in the same manner as a layman, except that when a priest hears a bishop's confession, the priest kneels.

There are many different practices regarding how often Orthodox Christians should go to confession. Some Patriarchates advise confession before each reception of Holy Communion, others advise confessing during each of the four fasting periods (Great Lent, Nativity Fast, Apostles' Fast and Dormition Fast), and there are many additional variants. Many pastors encourage frequent confession and communion. In some of the monasteries on Mount Athos, the monks will confess their sins daily.

Eastern Christians also continue to practice a form of general confession, (or manifest contrition), referred to as the rite of "Mutual Forgiveness". This rite involves an exchange between the priest and the congregation (or, in monasteries, between the superior and the brotherhood). The priest will make a prostration before all and ask their forgiveness for sins committed in act, word, deed, and thought. Those present ask that God may forgive them, and then they in turn all prostrate themselves and ask the priest's forgiveness. The priest then pronounces a blessing. The rite of Mutual Forgiveness does not replace the Mystery of Confession and Absolution, but is for the purpose of maintaining Christian charity and a humble and contrite spirit. This general confession is practiced in monasteries at the first service on arising (the Midnight Office) and the last service before retiring to sleep (Compline). Old Believers will perform the rite regularly before the beginning of the Divine Liturgy. The best-known asking of mutual forgiveness occurs at Vespers on the Sunday of Forgiveness, and it is with this act that Great Lent begins.

=== Lutheranism ===
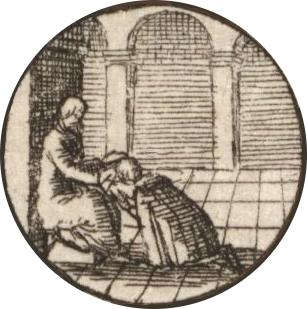
"Private Absolution ought to be retained in the churches, although in confession an enumeration of all sins is not necessary." (Augsburg Confession, Article 9)

Lutherans practice confession and absolution, seeing James 5:16 and John 20:22–23 as biblical evidence for the sacrament of confession.

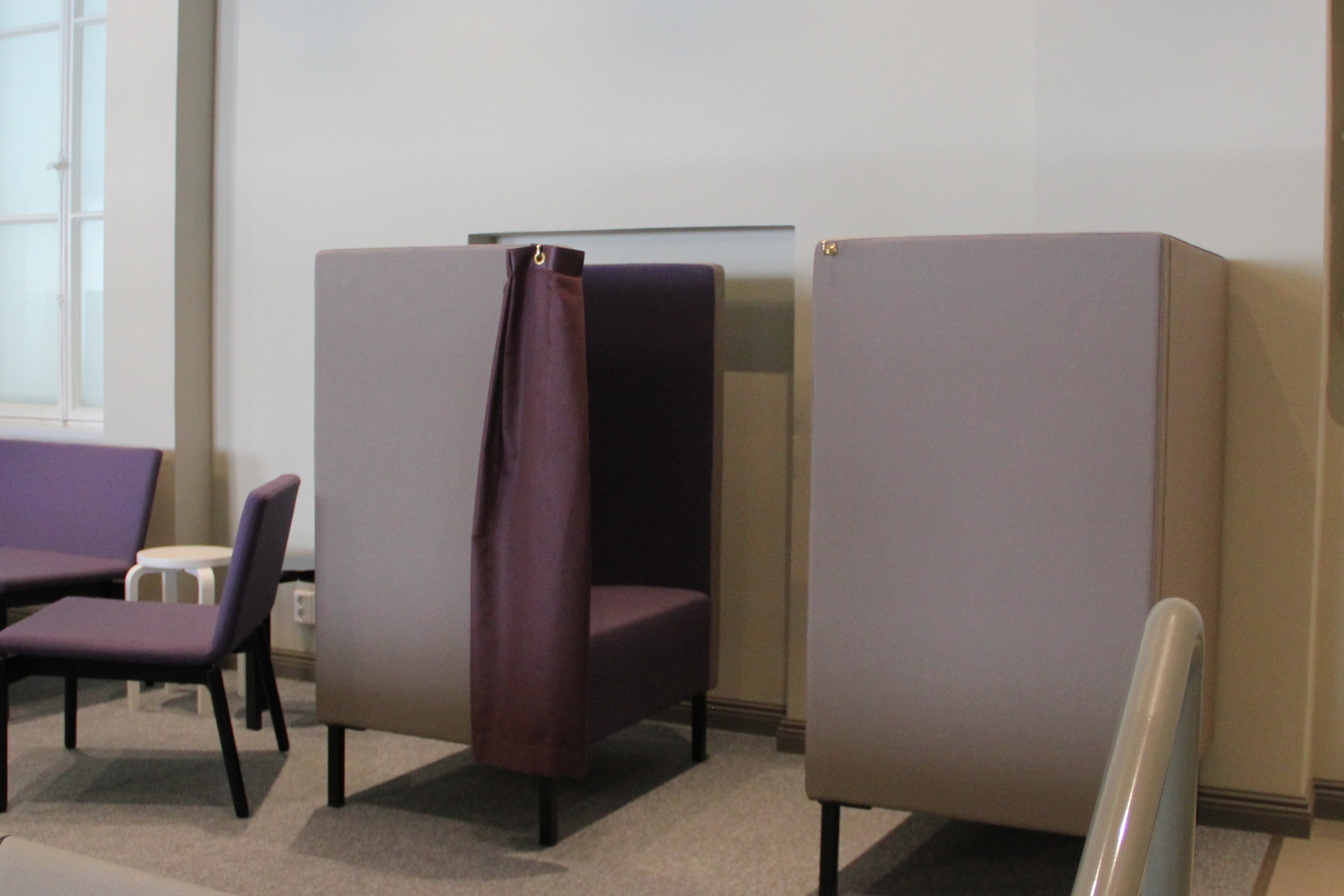
A confessional box in the Luther Church (Helsinki, Finland)

Holy Absolution is done privately to the priest/pastor. Here the person confessing (known as the "penitent") confesses individually their sins and makes an act of contrition as the pastor, acting in persona Christi, announces this following formula of absolution (or similar): "In the stead and by the command of my Lord Jesus Christ I forgive you all your sins in the name of the Father and of the Son and of the Holy Spirit." In the Lutheran Church, the pastor is bound by the Seal of the Confessional (similar to the Roman Catholic tradition). Luther's Small Catechism says "the pastor is pledged not to tell anyone else of sins to him in private confession, for those sins have been removed. Confession and Absolution is expected before partaking of the Eucharist for the first time. Confession and Absolution has historically been scheduled on Saturdays (after vespers), in preparation for Mass on the Lord's Day; for the same reason, many Lutheran churches also make the sacrament of confession available prior to the start of Sunday Mass (though it may be held on any day of the week depending on the individual Lutheran parish). Other Lutheran churches make the sacrament of confession available on request.

In addition to private confession, a General Confession during the offering of the Mass (Divine Service) may be done by the priest with the assembled congregation during the Penitential Act. Here, the entire congregation pauses for a moment of silent confession, recites the confiteor, and receives God's forgiveness through the pastor as he says the following (or similar): "Upon this your confession and in the stead and by the command of my Lord Jesus Christ, I forgive you all your sins in the name of the Father and of the Son and of the Holy Spirit."

=== Reformed, Presbyterian and Congregationalist ===
In the Reformed tradition (which includes the Continental Reformed, Presbyterian and Congregationalist denominations), corporate confession is the normative way that confession and absolution is practiced, though confession on an individual basis is an approved rite:

SACERDOTAL CONFESSION AND ABSOLUTION But we believe that this sincere confession which is made to God alone, either privately between God and the sinner, or publicly in the Church where the general confession of sins is said, is sufficient, and that in order to obtain forgiveness of sins it is not necessary for anyone to confess his sins to a priest, mumuring them in his ears, that in turn he might receive absolution from the priest with his laying on of hands, because there is neither a commandment nor an example of this in Holy Scriptures. David testifies and says: “I acknowledged my sin to thee, and did not hide my iniquity; I said, `I will confess my transgressions to the Lord’; then thou didst forgive the guilt of my sin” (Ps. 32:5). And the Lord who taught us to pray and at the same time to confess our sins said: “Pray then like this: Our Father, who art in heaven,…forgive us our debts, as we also forgive our debtors” (Matt. 6:12). Therefore it is necessary that we confess our sins to God our Father, and be reconciled with our neighbor if we have offended him. Concerning this kind of confession, the Apostle James says: “Confess your sins to one another” (James 5:16). If, however, anyone is overwhelmed by the burden of his sins and by perplexing temptations, and will seek counsel, instruction and comfort privately, either from a minister of the Church, or from any other brother who is instructed in God’s law, we do not disapprove; just as we also fully approve of that general and public confession of sins which is usually said in Church and in meetings for worship, as we noted above, inasmuch as it is agreeable to Scripture. —Second Helvetic Confession

The Order of Worship in the Bible Presbyterian Church, for example, enjoins the following:

Each Sunday we have a corporate confession of sins with an announcement of assurance of pardon from sin—this is great news for all believers. We strive to use the form of confession sincerely, to acknowledging our brokenness—in thought, word, and deed—and to receive God's forgiveness through Jesus Christ in thankfulness.

Many Reformed, Congregationalist and Presbyterian churches (including the Church of Scotland, Presbyterian Church (USA) and Presbyterian Church in America) practice Confession in the Divine Liturgy or Divine Worship on each Lord's Day. The practices are found in the Book of Common Worship, the Book of Order and the Book of Common Order.

It may start usually with the following confessional prayer read in unison, followed by the Kyrie Eleison or Trisagion (Holy God, holy and mighty) and Agnus Dei (Lamb of God).

Merciful God,
we confess that we have sinned against you
in thought, word, and deed,
by what we have done,
and by what we have left undone.

We have not loved you
with our whole heart and soul
and mind and strength.

We have not loved our neighbors as ourselves.

In your mercy,
forgive what we have been,
help us amend what we are,
and direct what we shall be,
so that we may delight in your will
and walk in your ways,
to the glory of your holy name.

— Book of Common Worship

Following this, an Assurance of Pardon is spoken.

The Presbyterian Church (USA)'s Directory of Worship, in directing the components or worship, states: "A prayer of confession of the reality of sin in personal and common life follows. In a declaration of pardon, the gospel is proclaimed and forgiveness is declared in the name of Jesus Christ. God's redemption and God's claim upon human life are remembered."

=== Anabaptism ===
Many Anabaptist denominations, including those of the Schwarzenau Brethren, Mennonite and Amish traditions, encourage confession to another or to the elders, and some denominations require such confession when a wrong has been done to a person as well as to God. Confession is then made to the person wronged and also to God, and is part of the reconciliation process. In cases where sin has resulted in the exclusion of a person from church membership due to unrepentance, public confession is often a prerequisite to readmission. The sinner confesses to the church their repentance and is received back into fellowship. In both cases there is a required manner to the confessions: for sins between God and man and for sins between man and man. Confession in the Anabaptist tradition is done in the humble posture of kneeling.

=== Anglicanism ===
In the Anglican tradition, confession and absolution is usually a component part of corporate worship, particularly at the Eucharist (as with Lutheranism). The form involves an exhortation to repentance by the priest, a period of silent prayer during which believers may inwardly confess their sins, a form of general confession said together by all present and the pronouncement of general absolution by the priest, often accompanied by the sign of the cross.

Private or auricular confession is also practiced by Anglicans and is especially common among Anglo-Catholics. The venue for confessions is either in the traditional confessional, which is the common practice among Anglo-Catholics, or in a private meeting with the priest. Often a priest will sit in the sanctuary, just inside the communion rail, facing toward the altar and away from the penitent. Other times they will use a portable screen to divide themselves and the penitent. Following the confession of sins and the assignment of penance, the priest makes the pronouncement of absolution. The seal of the confessional, as with Roman Catholicism, is absolute and any confessor who divulges information revealed in confession is subject to deposition and removal from office.

Historically, the practice of auricular confession was highly controversial within Anglicanism. When priests began to hear confessions, they responded to criticisms by pointing to the fact that such is explicitly sanctioned in "The Order for the Visitation of the Sick" in the Book of Common Prayer, which contains the following direction:

Here shall the sick person be moved to make a special Confession of his sins, if he feel his conscience troubled with any weighty matter. After which Confession, the Priest shall absolve him (if he humbly and heartily desire it).

— Book of Common Prayer

Auricular confession within mainstream Anglicanism became accepted in the second half of the 20th century; the 1979 Book of Common Prayer for the Episcopal Church in the US provides two forms for it in the section "The Reconciliation of a Penitent".

Private confession is also envisaged by the canon law of the Church of England, which contains the following, intended to safeguard the seal of the confessional:

[I]f any man confess his secret and hidden sins to the minister, for the unburdening of his conscience, and to receive spiritual consolation and ease of mind from him; we [...] do straitly charge and admonish him [i.e., the minister], that he does not at any time reveal and make known to any person whatsoever any crime or offence so committed to his trust and secrecy

— Proviso to Canon 113 of the Code of 1603

There is no requirement for private confession, but a common understanding that it may be desirable depending on individual circumstances. An Anglican aphorism regarding the practice is "All may; none must; some should".

Private confession of sins to a priest, followed by absolution, has always been provided for in the Book of Common Prayer. In the Communion Service of the 1662 English Prayer Book, for example, we read:

And because it is requisite, that no man should come to the holy Communion, but with a full trust in God's mercy, and with a quiet conscience; therefore, if there be any of you, who by this means [that is, by personal confession of sins] cannot quiet his own conscience herein, but requireth further comfort or counsel; let him come to me, or to some other discreet and learned Minister of God's Word, and open his grief; that by the ministry of God's holy Word he may receive the benefit of absolution, together with ghostly counsel and advice, to the quieting of his conscience, and avoiding of all scruple and doubtfulness.

The status of confession as lesser sacrament than Baptism and Communion is stated in Anglican formularies, such as the Thirty-Nine Articles. Article XXV includes it among "Those five commonly called Sacraments" which "are not to be counted for Sacraments of the Gospel [...] for that they have not any visible sign or ceremony ordained of God." In the view of some theologians, "commonly called Sacraments" does not mean "wrongly called Sacraments;" and that the Article merely distinguishes confession and the other rites from the two great Sacraments of the Gospel.

Until the Prayer Book revisions of the 1970s and the creation of Alternative Service Books in various Anglican provinces, the penitential rite was always part of larger services. Prior to the revision, private confessions would be according to the form of Ministry to the Sick. The form of absolution provided in the order for the Visitation of the Sick reads, "Our Lord Jesus Christ, who hath left power to his Church to absolve all sinners who truly repent and believe in him, of his great mercy forgive thee thine offences: And by his authority committed to me, I absolve thee from all thy sins, In the Name of the Father, and of the Son, and of the Holy Ghost. Amen."

Despite the provision for private confession in every edition of the Book of Common Prayer, the practice was frequently contested during the Ritualist controversies of the later nineteenth century.

=== Methodism ===
Methodist theology teaches that the Christian life should be characterized by holy living, free from sin. However, for individuals who fall into sin, Wesleyan doctrine holds that "there is a Saviour waiting with open arms ready to forgive and to help establish them in the Christian faith" and that these persons should "immediately confess the problem and restore the relationship with God." Methodists normatively practice confession of their sin to God himself through prayer, holding that "When we do confess, our fellowship with the Father is restored. He extends His parental forgiveness. He cleanses us of all unrighteousness, thus removing the consequences of the previously unconfessed sin. We are back on track to realise the best plan that He has for our lives."

In the Methodist churches, as with the Anglican Communion, the particular, private confession of sins to a pastor is defined by the Articles of Religion as one those "Commonly called Sacraments but not to be counted for Sacraments of the Gospel", also known as the "five lesser sacraments". John Wesley, the founder of the Methodist movement, held "the validity of Anglican practice in his day as reflected in the 1662 Book of Common Prayer", stating that "We grant confession to men to be in many cases of use: public, in case of public scandal; private, to a spiritual guide for disburdening of the conscience, and as a help to repentance." Additionally, per the recommendation of John Wesley, Methodist class meetings traditionally meet weekly in order to confess sins to one another.

The Book of Worship of The United Methodist Church contains the rite for private confession and absolution in "A Service of Healing II", in which the minister pronounces the words "In the name of Jesus Christ, you are forgiven!"; (Note: "A Service of Healing II", after the "Confession and Pardon", states "A Confession and Pardon from 474–94 or A Service of Word and Table V or UMH 890–93, or an appropriate psalm may be used." The words noted here are thus taken from page 52 of the Book of Worship, which details the Service of Word and Table V, specifically the conclusion of the part of the rite titled "Confession and Pardon".) some Methodist churches have regularly scheduled auricular confession and absolution, while others make it available upon request. Near the time of death, many Methodists confess their sins and receive absolution from an ordained minister, in addition to being anointed. Since Methodism holds the office of the keys to "belong to all baptized persons", private confession does not necessarily need to be made to a pastor, and therefore lay confession is permitted, although this is not the norm.

In the Methodist tradition, corporate confession is the most common practice, with the Methodist liturgy including "prayers of confession, assurance and pardon". The traditional confession of The Sunday Service, the first liturgical text used by Methodists, comes from the service of Morning Prayer in The Book of Common Prayer.

The confession of one's sin is particularly important before receiving Holy Communion; the official United Methodist publication about the Eucharist titled This Holy Mystery states that:

We respond to the invitation to the Table by immediately confessing our personal and corporate sin, trusting that, "If we confess our sins, He who is faithful and just will forgive us our sins and cleanse us from all unrighteousness" (1 John 1:9). Our expression of repentance is answered by the absolution in which forgiveness is proclaimed: "In the name of Jesus Christ, you are forgiven!"

In Methodism, the minister is bound by the Seal of the Confessional, with The Book of Discipline stating "All clergy of The United Methodist Church are charged to maintain all confidences inviolate, including confessional confidences"; any confessor who divulges information revealed in confession is subject to being defrocked in accordance with canon law.

The Book of Offices and Services of the Order of Saint Luke, a Methodist religious order, contains a corporate Service of Prayer for Reconciliation in addition to a Rite of Reconciliation for Individual Persons.

=== Irvingism ===
In the Irvingian churches, such as the New Apostolic Church, persons may confess their sins to an Apostle. The Apostle is then able to "take the confession and proclaim absolution". A seal of confession ensures that confidentiality between the Apostle and Penitent is maintained. In cases of grave urgency, any priestly minister can hear confessions and pronounce absolutions. Auricular confession is not necessary for forgiveness, but it may provide peace if a believer feels burdened.

=== Church of Jesus Christ of Latter-day Saints ===
The Church of Jesus Christ of Latter-day Saints (LDS Church) teaches that "confession is a necessary requirement for complete forgiveness." Such confessions take place in worthiness interviews prior to baptism into the church, to being set apart for any church callings, or to receiving yearly temple recommends.

Within confession, the sinner must confess both to God and to those persons wronged by the sin. Confession may also be required to an authorized priesthood leader, such as a bishop, branch president, stake president, or mission president. Although there is no definitive list of sins that require confession to a priesthood leader, "adultery, fornication, other sexual transgressions and deviancies, and sins of a comparable seriousness" are included, as is intentional and repeated use of pornography. Depending on the seriousness of the sin, the priesthood leader may counsel the sinner to submit to the authority of a disciplinary council, but does not have the authority to forgive sin, which can come only from God. The confession to the priesthood leader must be held in strict confidence unless the confessor grants permission to disclose it to the disciplinary council. The LDS Church rejects the belief that confession is all that is required to secure repentance from God.

== Hinduism ==
In Hinduism, confession is part of Prāyaścitta, a dharma-related term and refers to voluntarily accepting one's errors and misdeeds, confession, repentance, means of penance and expiation to undo or reduce the karmic consequences. It includes atonement for intentional and unintentional misdeeds. The ancient Hindu literature on repentance, expiation and atonement is extensive, with earliest mentions found in the Vedic literature. Illustrative means to repent for intentional and unintentional misdeeds include admitting one's misdeeds, austerities, fasting, pilgrimage and bathing in sacred waters, ascetic lifestyle, yajna (fire sacrifice, homa), praying, yoga, giving gifts to the poor and needy, and others.

Those texts that discuss Prāyaścitta, states Robert Lingat, debate the intent and thought behind the improper act, and consider penance appropriate when the "effect" had to be balanced, but "cause" was unclear.

== Islam ==
The act of seeking forgiveness from God for sins is called Istighfar. Confession of sins is made directly to God and not through man; the only exception is when confessing to a person is a required step in recompensing for the damage done. It is taught that sins are to be kept to oneself to seek individual forgiveness from God. God forgives those who seek his forgiveness and commit themselves not to repeat the sin. Typically, a Muslim will pray to God for forgiveness and promises that they will be careful not to commit the same mistake/sin ever again.

== Alcoholics Anonymous ==
In the AA Twelve-Step Program, confession is made in Step 5: "Admitted to God, to ourselves, and to another human being the exact nature of our wrongs."

"If we decline to follow through with this step, our un-confessed sins will haunt us, resulting in the demise of our body and spirit. We will have to continue paying the penalty of our wrongdoings."

"By completing the Fifth Step, we gain God's forgiveness, supervision, and strength. We obtain complete forgiveness..."

== Judaism ==
In Judaism, confession is an important part of attaining forgiveness for both sins against God and another man. Confessions to God are done communally in the plural. During Yom Kippur service, Jews confess that "We have sinned." In matters involving offenses against a fellow man, private confession to the victim is a requirement to obtaining forgiveness from the victim, which is generally a requirement to obtaining forgiveness from God. If the victim refuses to forgive, the offender confesses publicly, before larger and larger audiences. Confession (viduy) is also performed on one's deathbed, if at all possible.

In pre-rabbinic Judaism, sacrifices were an important part of atonement.

== Buddhism ==
Buddhism has been from its inception primarily a tradition of renunciation and monasticism. Within the monastic framework (called the Vinaya) of the sangha regular confession of wrongdoing to other monks is mandatory. In the suttas of the Pali Canon Bhikkhus sometimes even confessed their wrongdoing to the Buddha himself. That part of the Pali Canon called the Vinaya requires that monks confess their individual sins before the bi-weekly convening for the recitation of the Patimokkha.

== See also ==
- A Confession by Leo Tolstoy in which he describes his conversion to Christianity
- Atonement
- Augsburg Confession, the central document describing the religious convictions of the Lutheran reformation
- Confession inscriptions of Lydia and Phrygia Roman-era Greek confession steles
- Confession
- Confession (law)
- Confessionalization
- Confessions by Saint Augustine
- Lay confession
- Manifestation of Conscience
- Penance
- Repentance
- Right to silence
