= Inape lojae =

Scientific classification
- Domain: Eukaryota
- Kingdom: Animalia
- Phylum: Arthropoda
- Class: Insecta
- Order: Lepidoptera
- Family: Tortricidae
- Genus: Inape
- Species: I. lojae

Binomial name
- Inape lojae Razowski & Wojtusiak, 2008

Species of moth

Inape lojae is a species of moth of the family Tortricidae. It is found in Loja Province, Ecuador.

The wingspan is 27 millimetres (1.1 in).

== Etymology ==
The species name refers to the type locality.
