= Inape uncina =

Scientific classification
- Domain: Eukaryota
- Kingdom: Animalia
- Phylum: Arthropoda
- Class: Insecta
- Order: Lepidoptera
- Family: Tortricidae
- Genus: Inape
- Species: I. uncina

Binomial name
- Inape uncina Razowski & Pelz, 2006

Species of moth

Inape uncina is a species of moth of the family Tortricidae. It is found in Ecuador (Zamora-Chinchipe Province) and Peru.
