= Dainty blind snake =

Scientific classification
- Kingdom: Animalia
- Phylum: Chordata
- Class: Reptilia
- Order: Squamata
- Suborder: Serpentes
- Family: Leptotyphlopidae
- Genus: Trilepida
- Species: T. dimidiata

Binomial name
- Trilepida dimidiata (Jan, 1861)

Synonyms
- Leptotyphlops dimidiatus

Species of snake

The dainty blind snake (Trilepida dimidiata) is a species of snake in the family Leptotyphlopidae.
