= Inape stella =

Scientific classification
- Domain: Eukaryota
- Kingdom: Animalia
- Phylum: Arthropoda
- Class: Insecta
- Order: Lepidoptera
- Family: Tortricidae
- Genus: Inape
- Species: I. stella

Binomial name
- Inape stella Razowski & Wojtusiak, 2009

Species of moth

Inape stella is a species of moth of the family Tortricidae. It is found in Ecuador (Napo Province).

The wingspan is 23 millimetres (0.91 in).

== Etymology ==
The species name refers to the shape of the signum and is derived from Latin stella (meaning a star).
