= Inape cateres =

Scientific classification
- Kingdom: Animalia
- Phylum: Arthropoda
- Class: Insecta
- Order: Lepidoptera
- Family: Tortricidae
- Genus: Inape
- Species: I. cateres

Binomial name
- Inape cateres Razowski & Pelz, 2006

Species of moth

Inape cateres is a species of moth of the family Tortricidae that is endemic to Ecuador, especially in Azuay Province.
