= Inape sinuata =

Scientific classification
- Domain: Eukaryota
- Kingdom: Animalia
- Phylum: Arthropoda
- Class: Insecta
- Order: Lepidoptera
- Family: Tortricidae
- Genus: Inape
- Species: I. sinuata

Binomial name
- Inape sinuata Brown & Razowski, 2003

Species of moth

Inape sinuata is a species of moth of the family Tortricidae. It is found in Bolivia and Ecuador (Zamora-Chinchipe Province).

The wingspan is 9.5 millimetres (0.37 in).
