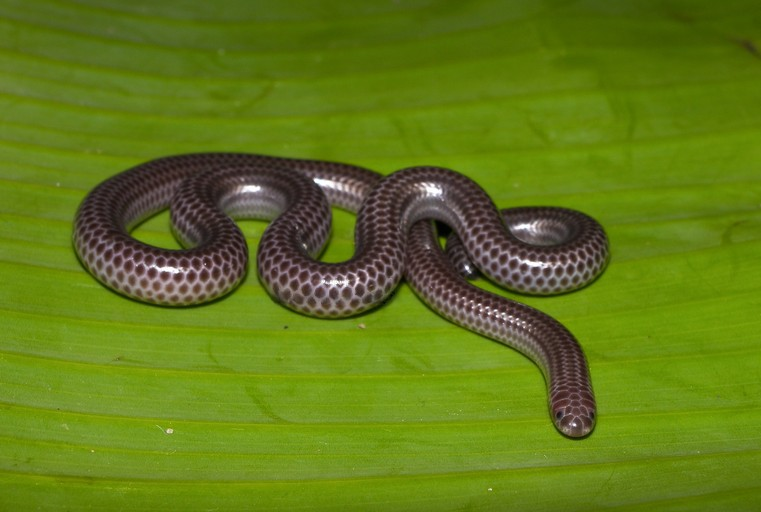
- Big-scaled blind snake (Trilepida macrolepis)

Scientific classification
- Kingdom: Animalia
- Phylum: Chordata
- Class: Reptilia
- Order: Squamata
- Suborder: Serpentes
- Family: Leptotyphlopidae
- Subfamily: Epictinae
- Genus: Trilepida; Hedges, 2011

= Trilepida =

Genus of snakes

Trilepida is a genus of snakes in the family Leptotyphlopidae.

== Geographic range ==
Species in the genus Trilepida are native to northern South America and Panama.

== Taxonomy ==
All of the species in the genus Trilepida were previously placed in the genus Leptotyphlops.

== Species ==
The genus contains the following species which are recognized as being valid.

- Trilepida acutirostris Pinto & Curcio, 2011
- Trilepida affinis (Boulenger, 1884) – Venezuela blind snake
- Trilepida anthracina (Bailey, 1946) – Bailey's blind snake
- Trilepida brasiliensis (Laurent, 1949) – Brazilian blind snake
- Trilepida brevissima (Shreve, 1964) – Caqueta blind snake
- Trilepida dimidiata (Jan, 1861) – dainty blind snake
- Trilepida dugandi (Dunn, 1944) – Dugand's blind snake
- Trilepida fuliginosa (Passos, Caramaschi & Pinto, 2006)
- Trilepida guayaquilensis (Orejas-Miranda & J. Peters, 1970) – Guayaquila blind snake
- Trilepida jani (Pinto & Fernandes, 2012)
- Trilepida joshuai (Dunn, 1944) – Joshua's blind snake
- Trilepida koppesi (Amaral, 1955) – Amaral's blind snake
- Trilepida macrolepis (W. Peters, 1858) – big-scaled blind snake
- Trilepida nicefori (Dunn, 1946) – Santander blind snake
- Trilepida pastusa (Salazar-Valenzuela, Martins, Amador-Oyola & Torres-Carvajal, 2015)
- Trilepida salgueiroi (Amaral, 1955) – Espírito Santo blind snake

Nota bene: A binomial authority in parentheses indicates that the species was originally described in a genus other than Trilepida.
