= Inape rigidsocia =

Scientific classification
- Domain: Eukaryota
- Kingdom: Animalia
- Phylum: Arthropoda
- Class: Insecta
- Order: Lepidoptera
- Family: Tortricidae
- Genus: Inape
- Species: I. rigidsocia

Binomial name
- Inape rigidsocia Razowski & Wojtusiak, 2008

Species of moth of the family Tortricidae found in Ecuador

Inape rigidsocia is a species of moth of the family Tortricidae. It is found in Ecuador (Pichincha Province).

The wingspan is 20 millimetres (0.79 in).

== Etymology ==
The species name is derived from Latin rigidus (meaning rigid).
