= Inape reductana =

Scientific classification
- Kingdom: Animalia
- Phylum: Arthropoda
- Class: Insecta
- Order: Lepidoptera
- Family: Tortricidae
- Genus: Inape
- Species: I. reductana

Binomial name
- Inape reductana Brown & Razowski, 2003

Species of moth

Inape reductana is a species of moth of the family Tortricidae and is endemic to Peru.

The wingspan is 9.2 millimetres (0.36 in).
