= Manifesto (music venue) =

Music venue in Hoorn, Netherlands

Coordinates: 52°39′2″N 5°4′27″E

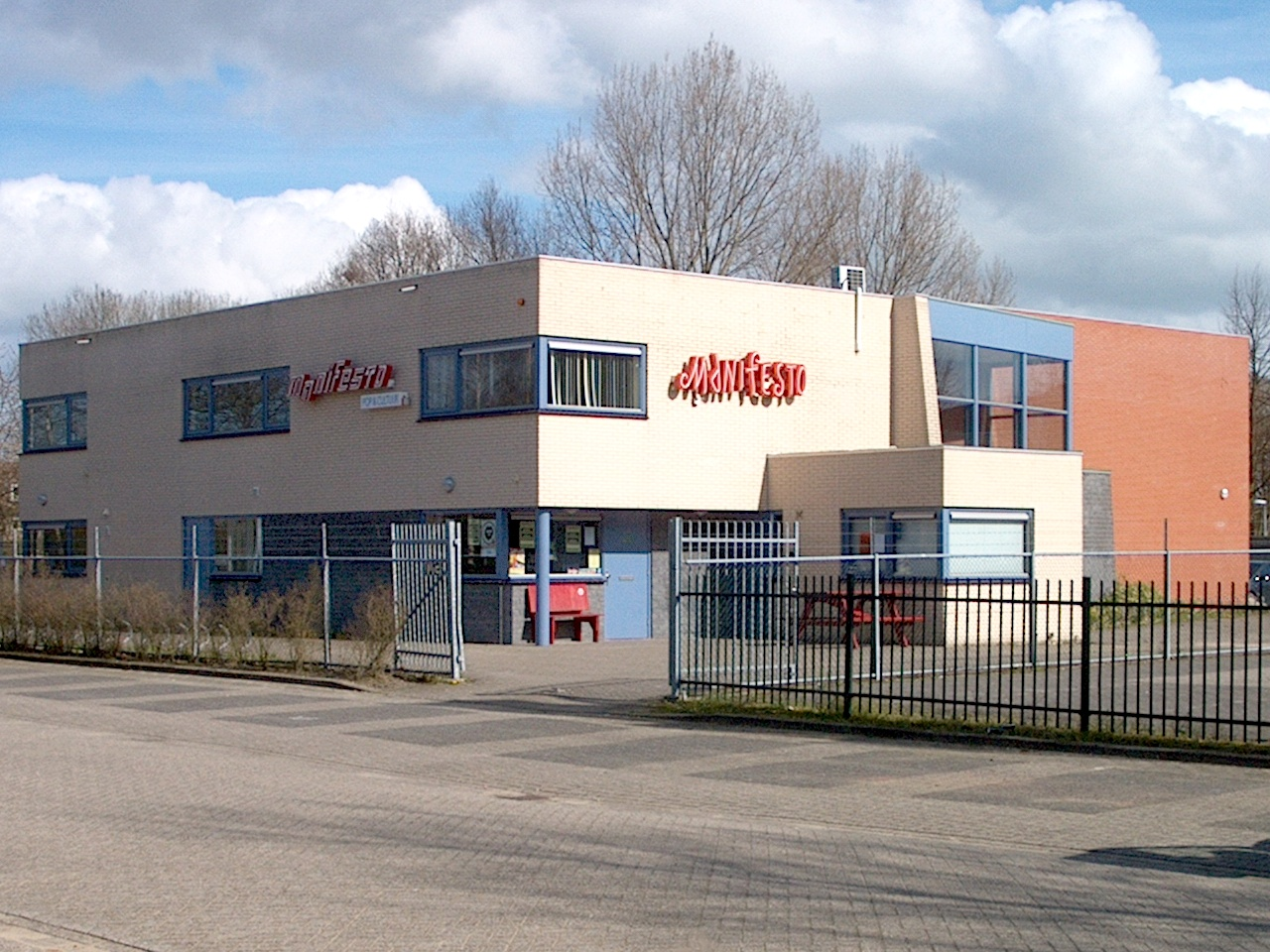
- Manifesto in Hoorn
- Interactive map of Manifesto
- Location: Hoorn, the Netherlands
- Capacity: 350
- Type: Music venue

Construction
- Opened: 1999

Manifesto is a music venue located at the Holenweg in Hoorn. The venue opened in 1999 and replaced the closed youth center Troll. The location has a total capacity of 350 people. The location has two different stages, namely the hall and the café. The hall has a capacity of 300 people and the café has a capacity of 50 people.

Some noteworthy artists who have performed at this location are The Pretty Things, Mick Taylor, Russkaja, The Charm The Fury and Chef'Special. There are also often performances by local, regional and upcoming artists.
