= Solstice (novel) =

1984 novel by Joyce Carol Oates

- First edition
- Author: Joyce Carol Oates
- Language: English
- Publisher: E. P. Dutton
- Publication date: January 23, 1984
- Publication place: United States
- Media type: Print (hardback)
- Pages: 214
- ISBN: 978-2234024632

Solstice is a novel by Joyce Carol Oates first published in 1984 by E. P. Dutton and reprinted by Berkley Books in 1985. Solstice is an examination of a tempestuous lesbian romance involving two heterosexual women, each striving to gain control of the relationship and their self-identity.

== Plot ==
The novel is written from third-person omniscient point-of-view with Monica Jensen and Sheila Trask as the focal characters.

== Reception ==
In a generally negative review, New York Times literary critic Christopher Lehmann-Haupt detects Hemingwayesque male-male portraits in the platonic lesbian relationship between Monica and Sheila, thematically framed as an inverted Men Without Women (1927).

Uncertain as to Oates's literary aims in the novel, Lehmann-Haupt suggests it may be "meant to be nothing more than a tour de force...evoking its erotic power solely through its imagery" or alternately "that masculine-feminine bipolarity has little to do with the mix of gender." He concludes: "What is clear is that the ending of Solstice is unsatisfying. It seems to trail off, to disappear into itself...one is left to wonder if Miss Oates has not lost herself in her own artistic labyrinth."

== Theme ==
The theme revolves around the challenges of female-to-female relationships, selfhood, and creativity. Oates enlists the concept of the "double" or doppelganger that serves to reveal the shifting roles of Sheila and Monica. Biographer Joanne V. Creighton writes:

The double, for Oates, often functions as an alter ego, embodying unfulfilled contexts of the self to which one is both attracted and repelled—a bond that seems at once potentially liberating and potentially annihilating.

A figurative "life-and-death" struggle ensues between the women whose ideal goal is a balanced "symbiosis." Oates provides an extended metaphor dramatizing the point:

It was Monica's task, Monica's privilege, to help Sheila maintain an emotional equilibrium: an activity that took a great deal of her time and was in itself exhilarating. Walking a tightrope, high above the ground. Eyes fixed resolutely ahead, arms outspread for balance. The trick being not to look down; not ever to look down.

Literary critic Rebecca Pepper Sinkler identifies Solstice as a significant contribution to "the literature of women's relationships." Oates challenges assumptions that most female-to-female relationships, ipso facto, enjoy a camaraderie superior to those involving the opposite sex: "Those looking for a cozy rendition of sisterly love won't find it here."

Characterizing Monica Jensen as "one of Miss Oates's most believable professional victims," Sinkler locates the novel's central theme:

In Miss Oates's hell, there is an especially hot place reserved for those who believe they can walk away from their experiences unscathed, and Monica will learn the hard way what happens to one who cannot remember her past."

Sinkler adds "Solstice should dispel a lot of comforting ideas about the nature of women." Literary critic Lehmann-Haupt suggests that the novel may be "nothing more than a tour de force—an account of a lesbian relationship without explicitness, evoking its erotic power solely through its imagery."

== Sources ==
- Creighton, Joanne V.. 1979. Joyce Carol Oates: Novels of the Middle Years. Twayne Publishers, New York. Warren G. French, editor. ISBN 0-8057-7647-8
- Lehmann-Haupt, Christopher. 1985. New York Times, January 10, 1985. https://www.nytimes.com/1985/01/10/books/books-of-the-times-204833.html Accessed 31 January 2025.
- Oates, Joyce Carol. 1985. Solstice. Dutton Press, New York. ISBN 978-2234024632
- Sinkler, Rebecca Pepper. 1985. "Time and Her Sisters." New York Times, January 20, 1985. Book Review Section. https://archive.nytimes.com/www.nytimes.com/books/00/10/01/nnp/solstice.html Accessed 20 February 2025.
