= Epiphany (Ian Villafana album) =

Studio album by Ian Villafana
- Released: January 1, 2010
- Genre: Jazz, Smooth jazz, R&B
- Producer: Quintin Gerard W.

Epiphany is the first studio album by Smooth jazz artist Ian Villafana, released in 2010.

== Track listing ==
1. "Asil"
2. "Klueless"
3. "Tavion"
4. "Caribbean Lights"
5. "Epiphany"
6. "Lovers Come, Lovers Go"
7. "Sunday Morning Love"
8. "Lazy in Love"

== Personnel ==
- Steel Acoustic/Nylon Acoustic guitar: Ian Villafana
- Electric guitar: Ian Villafana
- Vocals: Jada B, Quintin Gerard W.
- Bass guitar: Larry Allen, Ian Villafana
- Production/Programming: Quintin Gerard W.
- Electric piano: Eric Nicholas
- Additional piano/keyboard: Quintin Gerard W.
