= Inape balzapamba =

Scientific classification
- Domain: Eukaryota
- Kingdom: Animalia
- Phylum: Arthropoda
- Class: Insecta
- Order: Lepidoptera
- Family: Tortricidae
- Genus: Inape
- Species: I. balzapamba

Binomial name
- Inape balzapamba Razowski & Wojtusiak, 2008

Species of moth

Inape balzapamba is a species of moth of the family Tortricidae. It is found in Bolívar Province, Ecuador.

The wingspan is 20.5 millimetres (0.81 in).
