= Ian Villafana =

- Ian Villafana playing a Solitaire guitar

Background information
- Born: February 26, 1957 (age 68); Trinidad and Tobago
- Genres: Jazz, R&B, smooth jazz
- Occupation: Musician
- Instrument: Guitar
- Years active: 1976–present
- Website: www.ianv.us

Ian Villafana (born February 26, 1957) is a smooth jazz guitarist.

The son of a pianist, Villafana was introduced to many genres of music at a young age. His influences include the Beatles and George Benson. He learned from local musicians Clive Zanda, Len 'Boogsie' Sharpe, Raf Robertson, Earl Rodney, and Toby Tobias. He began recording albums with Lord Kitchener, Superblue/Blue Boy, Valentino, and Crazy.

Blending Calypso music and jazz with bossa nova allowed Villafana to form his own style. He entertained crowds in Trinidad and St. Croix with solo performances and appearances on radio and television. He played double bass with Jimmy Hamilton, who performed with Duke Ellington. While in St. Croix, Villafana met Ed Cherry and Dizzy Gillespie. Cherry introduced him to the methods of Joe Pass, which influenced his playing style.

Villafana moved to the United States, intending to enroll in the Berklee College of Music. He got an industrial job and started a family in Louisiana while performing R&B with local musicians. Recording for Quintin Gerard W. inspired him to record his first album, Epiphany (2010).

== Discography ==
- 2010: Epiphany
