= Percy Villafana =

The former Cooperative Development Officer of the Ministry of Agriculture of the Republic of Trinidad and Tobago is headed by Percy Villafana

== March 15, 2010 ==
The 81-year-old man became well known after Trinidadians watched on television as Trinidad Prime Minister Patrick Manning was denied entry to Mr Villafana's yard. The Prime Minister was on a political walkabout in the San Juan area and Mr Villafana, standing with his arms crossed in front of him, tried to stop the PM from entering his yard and clearly demonstrating his displeasure with Manning's visit.

Villafana put his hands on Manning's shoulders and shouted, "You didn't hear what I say? You not welcome here!" This caused Manning's personal bodyguards to separate Villafana from the Prime Minister. As Manning carried on his walkabout, his bodyguard told Villafana, "You're very lucky. No matter what, you're not supposed to touch the Prime Minister or hold the Prime Minister."

Villafana said the $2 million flag at the Hasley Crawford Stadium in Mucurapo and the poor condition of the Croisse, among other things, had prompted his actions and was quoted as saying that he welcomed a sit down with the PM to discuss the matter. He also said in an interview that he held his arms out like a cross as "a sign to ward off evil."

This symbol may have some occult origin but this has not been confirmed by Mr. Villafana. The occult skull and cross bones is likened to it.

Public discontent swelled when PM Manning, in Parliament, made allegations against the elderly citizen, saying he was "a Canadian citizen who frequently visits the country" after being heckled about the incident by Oropouche East MP, Roodal Moonilal. This provoked public comments alleging that the PM was using the arms of the state illegally to "investigate" a citizen who was protecting his constitutional rights.

In a news article on March 23, 2010, he stated that after the confrontation with the PM, he now fears for his life. "What I am very scared of is the repercussions," he said. "I got to be careful now man".

Online support for his actions, and his constitutional rights enabling such actions, were expressed on various news sites and social networking sites.
