= Manifestation of conscience =

Catholic religious practice

Manifestation of conscience is a practice, in religious orders, of making one's superior, such as an abbot or prior, aware of the state of one's conscience. This is so the superior may know them intimately, and thus further their spiritual progress.

Manifestation of conscience is not a form of Confession and therefore the superior need not be a priest. As in Confession, however, the secret must, however, be kept inviolably, and hence a subject may object to any external use whatever of the revelations they have made to the superior.

The knowledge of the state of soul acquired by manifestation of conscience enables the superior to determine the expediency of the frequency of communion, what spiritual reading is to be selected, what penances to be practised, what counsel to be given concerning doubts, difficulties, and temptations.

By the decree Quemadmodum, of 17 December 1890, Pope Leo XIII forbade both mandatory manifestation of conscience and the practice of superiors inducing their subjects to make such manifestations.

An important contribution to the history of Canon 630 of the 1983 Codex, which incorporates Quemadmodum from a legislative perspective, can be found in Jacques Bagnoud’s recent work (pp. 340–348).
