= San Miguel, Bolívar =

San Miguel
- Town
- Location within Ecuador
- Coordinates: 01°42′0″S 79°02′0″W
- Country: Ecuador
- Province: Bolívar Province
- Canton: San Miguel Canton

Government
  - Mayor: Vinicio Coloma Romero

Area
  - Town: 2.54 km^{2} (0.98 sq mi)

Population (2022 census)
  - Town: 8,806
  - Density: 3,470/km^{2} (8,980/sq mi)
- Time zone: ECT
- Climate: Cwb
- Website: sanmigueldebolivar.gov

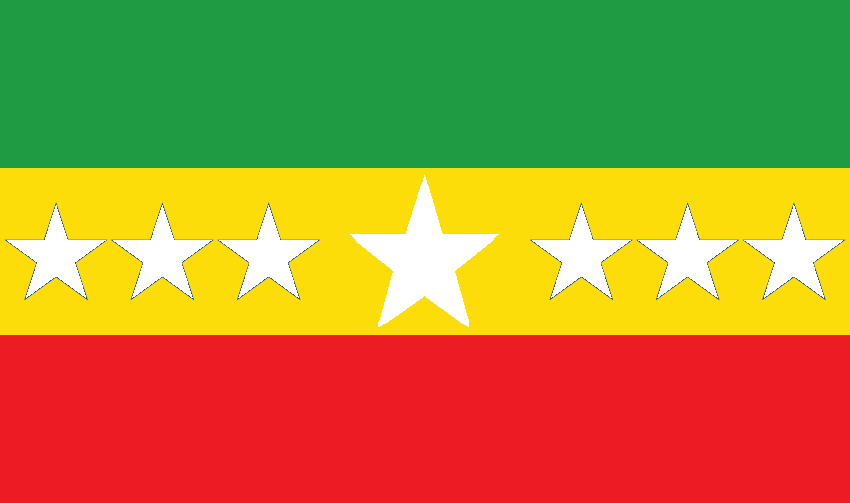
Flag of San Miguel de Bolívar

San Miguel is a town in the Bolívar Province, Ecuador. It is the seat of the San Miguel Canton.
