= Epifanie (Berio) =

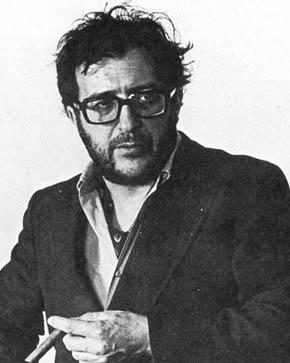
Luciano Berio in the 1970s

Epifanie is a musical composition for female voice and large orchestra in twelve movements by the Italian composer Luciano Berio.

In Italian an epifania (plural: epifanie, with both forms accented on the second "i") indicates a sudden spiritual manifestation (See: Epiphany). Berio composed his Epifanie between 1960 and 1963, and published a revised version in 1965. It consists of seven short orchestral pieces, and five vocal pieces. Berio stipulates the possibility of performing these in ten different sequences. When the American premiere of Epifanie took place in Chicago on July 23, 1967, he said:

Epifanie is, in essence, a cycle of orchestral pieces into which a cycle of vocals pieces has been interpolated. The two 'cycles' can be combined in various ways; they can also be performed separately. The texts of the vocal pieces have been taken from Proust (À l'ombre des jeunes filles en fleurs), Antonio Machado (Nuevas Canciones), Joyce (A Portrait of the Artist as a Young Man and Ulysses), Edoardo Sanguineti (Triperuno), Claude Simon (La route des Flandres), and Brecht (An die Nachgeborenen).

The significant connection between the vocals pieces can thus appear in different lights according to their position in the instrumental development. The chosen order will emphasize the apparent heterogeneity of the texts or their dialectic unity. The texts are arranged in such a way as to suggest a gradual passage from a lyric transfiguration of reality (Proust, Machado, Joyce) to a disenchanted acknowledgment of things (Simon; for this text the voice speaks and becomes gradually nullified by the orchestra). Lastly, the words of Bertolt Brecht, which have nothing to do with the epiphany of words and visions. They are the cry of regret and anguish with which Brecht warns us that often it is necessary to renounce the seduction of words when they sound like an invitation to forget our links to a world constructed by our own acts.

The score calls for an unusually large orchestra: 16 woodwinds; 6 horns, 4 trumpets and 4 trombones plus tuba, full strings, including three violin sections, and a percussion section calling for a number of performers who address themselves not only to glockenspiel, celesta, vibraphone and marimba but also to spring coils, tamtam, tom-tom, temple blocks, wood blocks, bongos, timpani, cowbells, tubular bells, claves, guiro, cencerros, cymbals, snare drum, tambourine, etc.

The BBC Proms premiere was given in the Royal Albert Hall, London on 8 August 1986, by Elizabeth Laurence and the BBC Philharmonic Orchestra conducted by Edward Downes.
