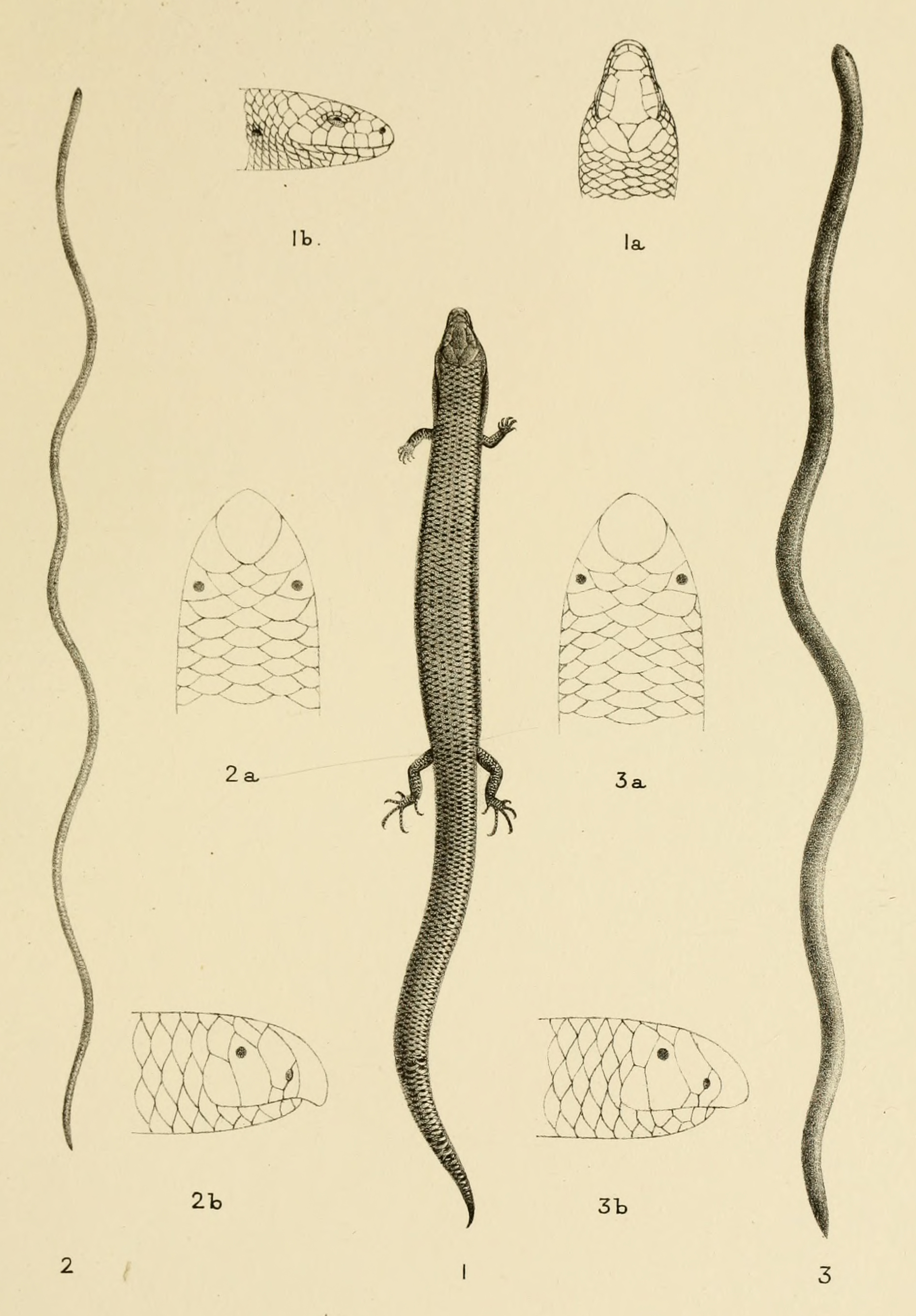
- An illustration of Myriopholis macrura, and the other Socotran reptiles Parachalcides socotranus and Myriopholis filiformis. 3 is M. filiformis, 3a and 3b views of its head.

Conservation status
- Data Deficient (IUCN 3.1)

Scientific classification
- Kingdom: Animalia
- Phylum: Chordata
- Class: Reptilia
- Order: Squamata
- Suborder: Serpentes
- Family: Leptotyphlopidae
- Genus: Myriopholis
- Species: M. macrura

Binomial name
- Myriopholis macrura (Boulenger, 1903)

Synonyms
- Glauconia macrura; Leptotyphlops macrura; Leptotyphlops macrurus

= Boulenger's blind snake =

Species of snake

Boulenger's blind snake (Myriopholis macrura) is a species of snake in the family Leptotyphlopidae.
