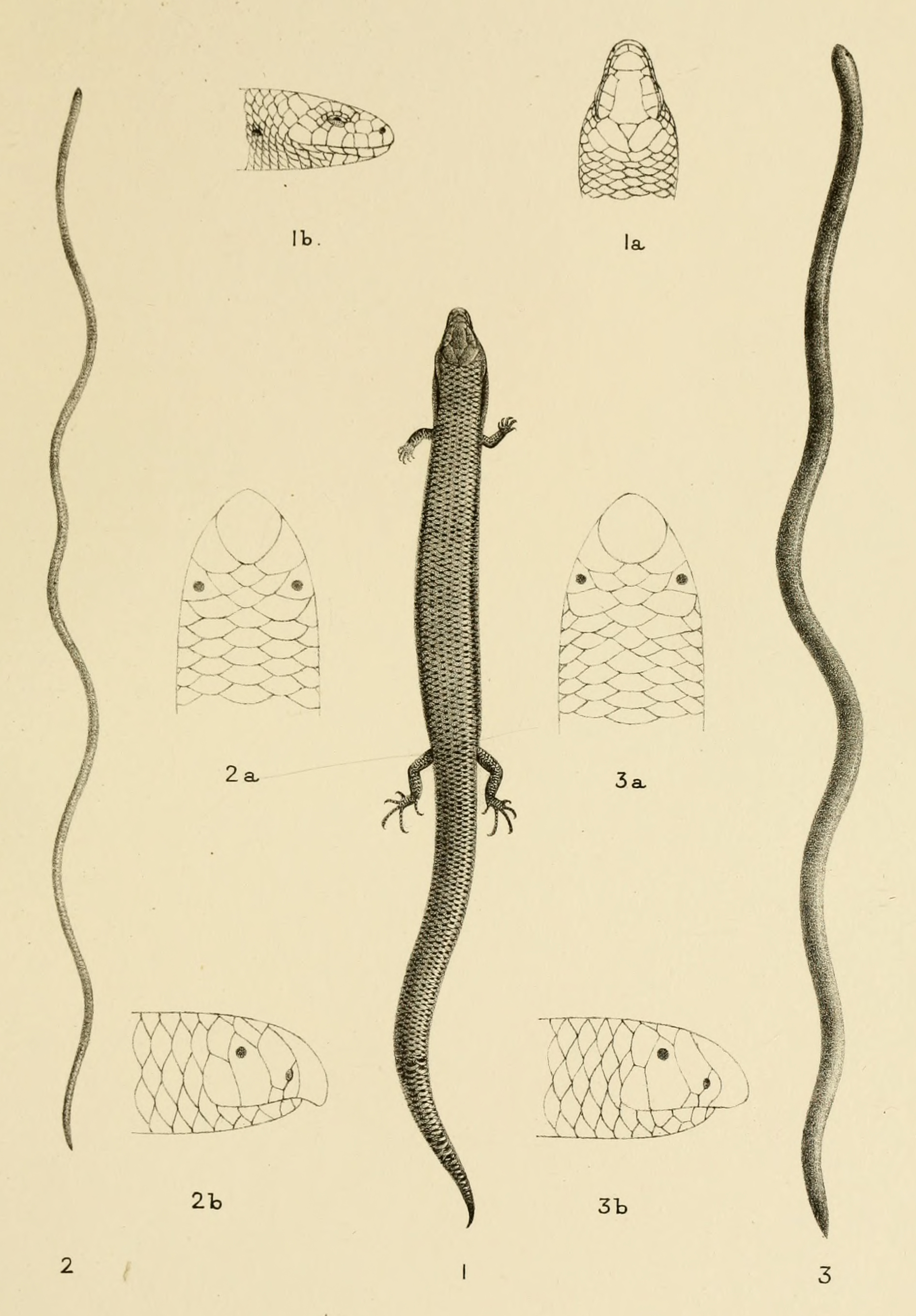
- An illustration of Myriopholis filiformis, and the other Socotran reptiles Parachalcides socotranus and Myriopholis macrura. 2 is M. filiformis, 2a and ab views of its head.

Conservation status
- Data Deficient (IUCN 3.1)

Scientific classification
- Kingdom: Animalia
- Phylum: Chordata
- Class: Reptilia
- Order: Squamata
- Suborder: Serpentes
- Family: Leptotyphlopidae
- Genus: Myriopholis
- Species: M. filiformis

Binomial name
- Myriopholis filiformis (Boulenger, 1899)

Synonyms
- Glauconia filiformis; Leptotyphlops filiformis

= Socotra Island blind snake =

Species of snake

The Socotra Island blind snake (Myriopholis filiformis) is a species of snake in the family Leptotyphlopidae.
