= Indistinct ground snake =

There are two species of snake named indistinct ground snake:

- Atractus esepe
- Atractus indistinctus
