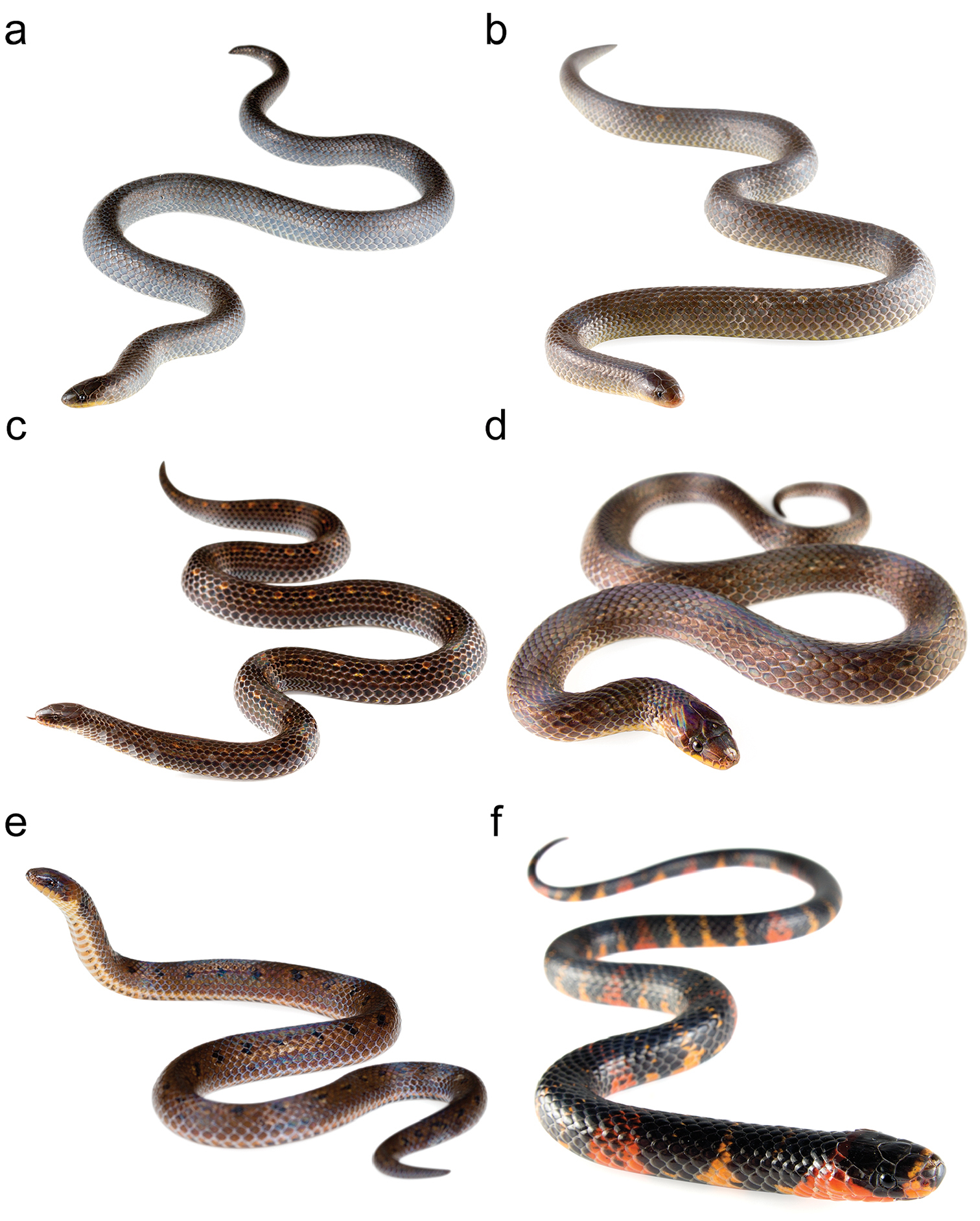

Scientific classification
- Kingdom: Animalia
- Phylum: Chordata
- Class: Reptilia
- Order: Squamata
- Suborder: Serpentes
- Family: Colubridae
- Subfamily: Dipsadinae
- Genus: Atractus; Wagler, 1828

Synonyms
- Adelphicos; Brachyorrhos; Calamaria; Isoscelis; Rabdosoma; Rhegnops

= Atractus =

Genus of snakes

Atractus is a genus of snakes, commonly called ground snakes, in the subfamily Dipsadinae of the family Colubridae. The genus includes more than 150 distinct species.

== Geographic range ==
Snakes of the genus Atractus are endemic to Central and South America.

== Description ==
In the genus Atractus the maxilla is short, with 8–12 teeth; the maxillary and mandibular teeth decrease in size posteriorly. The head is not distinct from the neck. The eye is small, with a round or subelliptic pupil. The nostril is between two nasal scales. The preocular is usually absent, and the loreal and prefrontal scales enter the orbit. The body is cylindrical. The dorsal scales are smooth, without apical pits, in 15 or 17 rows. The ventral scales are rounded. The tail can be either short or rather long. The subcaudals are paired.

== Reproduction ==
The genus Atractus is oviparous.

== Species ==
The following species are recognized as being valid.

Nota bene: A binomial authority in parentheses indicates that the species was originally described in a genus other than Atractus.

- Atractus aboiporu Melo-Sampaio, Passos, Fouquet, Prudente & Torres-Carvajal, 2019
- Atractus acheronius Passos, Rivas & Barrio-Amorós, 2009
- Atractus akerios Melo‐Sampaio, Passos, Prudente, Venegas & Torres‐Carvajal, 2021
- Atractus albuquerquei Cunha & Nascimento, 1983 – Albuquerque ground snake
- Atractus alphonsehogei Cunha & Nascimento, 1983 – Alphonse's ground snake
- Atractus altagratiae Passos & Fernandes, 2008
- Atractus alytogrammus G. Köhler & Kieckbusch, 2014
- Atractus andinus Prado, 1944 – Andean ground snake
- Atractus apophis Passos & J.D. Lynch, 2010
- Atractus arangoi Prado, 1940 – brown ground snake, big ground snake
- Atractus atlas Passos, Scanferla, Melo-Sampaio, Brito & Almendariz, 2018 – atlas ground snake
- Atractus atratus Passos & J.D. Lynch, 2010
- Atractus attenuatus Myers & Schargel, 2006
- Atractus avernus Passos et al., 2009
- Atractus ayeush Esqueda, 2011
- Atractus badius (F. Boie, 1827) – Boie's ground snake
- Atractus biseriatus Prado, 1941 – two-lined ground snake
- Atractus bocki F. Werner, 1909 – Bock's ground snake
- Atractus bocourti Boulenger, 1894 – Bocourt's ground snake
- Atractus boimirim Passos, Prudente & J.D. Lynch, 2016
- Atractus boulengerii Peracca, 1896
- Atractus caete Passos et al., 2010
- Atractus careolepis G. Köhler & Kieckbusch, 2014
- Atractus carrioni Parker, 1930 – Parker's ground snake, Carrion's ground snake
- Atractus caxiuana Prudente & Santos-Costa, 2006
- Atractus cerberus Arteaga et al., 2017 – Cerberus ground snake
- Atractus charitoae Silva Haad, 2004
- Atractus chthonius Passos & J.D. Lynch, 2010
- Atractus clarki Dunn & Bailey, 1939 – Clark's ground snake
- Atractus collaris Peracca, 1896 – collared ground snake
- Atractus crassicaudatus (A.M.C. Duméril, Bibron & A.H.A. Duméril, 1854) – thickhead ground snake
- Atractus dapsilis Melo-Sampaio, Passos, Fouquet, Prudente & Torres-Carvajal, 2019
- Atractus darienensis Myers, 2003
- Atractus depressiocellus Myers, 2003
- Atractus discovery Arteaga, Quezada, Vieira, & Guayasamin, 2022
- Atractus duboisi (Boulenger, 1880)
- Atractus duidensis Roze, 1961 – Venezuela ground snake
- Atractus dunni Savage, 1955 – Dunn's ground snake
- Atractus echidna Passos et al., 2009
- Atractus ecuadorensis Savage, 1955 – Ecuadorean ground snake
- Atractus edioi da Silva et al., 2005
- Atractus elaps (Günther, 1858) – black ground snake
- Atractus emigdioi Gonzalez-Sponga, 1971 – Emigdio's ground snake
- Atractus emmeli (Boettger, 1888) – Emmel's ground snake, Boettger's ground snake
- Atractus eriki Esqueda, La Marca & Bazó, 2007
- Atractus erythromelas Boulenger, 1903 – red-black ground snake
- Atractus esepe Arteaga et al., 2017 – indistinct ground snake
- Atractus favae (de Filippi, 1840) – Filippi's ground snake
- Atractus flammigerus (F. Boie, 1827) – flaming ground snake
- Atractus franciscopaivai Silva Haad, 2004
- Atractus francoi Passos et al., 2010
- Atractus fuliginosus (Hallowell, 1845) – Hallowell's ground snake
- Atractus gaigeae Savage, 1955 – Gaige's ground snake
- Atractus gigas Myers & Schargel, 2006 – giant ground snake
- Atractus guentheri (Wucherer, 1861) – Günther's ground snake
- Atractus heliobelluomini Silva Haad, 2004
- Atractus heyeri Esqueda & McDiarmid, 2015
- Atractus hoogmoedi Prudente & Passos, 2010
- Atractus hostilitractus Myers, 2003
- Atractus imperfectus Myers, 2003
- Atractus indistinctus Prado, 1940 – indistinct ground snake
- Atractus insipidus Roze, 1961
- Atractus iridescens Peracca, 1896 – iridescent ground snake
- Atractus lancinii Roze, 1961 – Lancini's ground snake
- Atractus lasallei Amaral, 1931 – Lasalle's ground snake
- Atractus latifrons (Günther, 1868) – broadhead ground snake
- Atractus lehmanni Boettger, 1898 – Lehmann's ground snake
- Atractus loveridgei Amaral, 1930 – Loveridge's ground snake
- Atractus macondo Passos, J.D. Lynch & Fernandes, 2009
- Atractus maculatus (Günther, 1858) – spotted ground snake
- Atractus major Boulenger, 1894 – brown ground snake
- Atractus manizalesensis Prado, 1940
- Atractus mariselae Lancini, 1969 – Marisela's ground snake
- Atractus marthae Meneses-Pelayo & Passos, 2019
- Atractus matthewi Markezich & Barrio-Amorós, 2004
- Atractus medusa Passos et al., 2009
- Atractus melanogaster F. Werner, 1916 – blackbelly ground snake
- Atractus melas Boulenger, 1908 – dark ground snake
- Atractus meridensis Esqueda & La Marca, 2005
- Atractus michaelsabini Arteaga, Quezada, Vieira, & Guayasamin, 2022
- Atractus micheleae Esqueda & La Marca, 2005
- Atractus microrhynchus (Cope, 1868)
- Atractus mijaresi Esqueda & La Marca, 2005
- Atractus modestus Boulenger, 1894 – modest ground snake
- Atractus multicinctus (Jan, 1865) – banded ground snake
- Atractus multidentatus Passos, Rivas & Barrio-Amorós, 2009
- Atractus nasutus Passos, Fernandes & J.D. Lynch, 2009
- Atractus natans Hoogmoed & Prudente, 2003
- Atractus nawa Melo‐Sampaio, Passos, Prudente, Venegas & Torres‐Carvajal, 2021
- Atractus nicefori Amaral, 1930 – northern ground snake
- Atractus nigricauda Schmidt & Walker, 1943 – black-headed ground snake
- Atractus nigriventris Amaral, 1933 – black-ventered ground snake
- Atractus obesus Marx, 1960 – fat ground snake
- Atractus obtusirostris F. Werner, 1916 – bignose ground snake
- Atractus occidentalis Savage, 1955 – western ground snake
- Atractus occipitoalbus (Jan, 1862) – gray ground snake
- Atractus ochrosetrus Esqueda & La Marca, 2005
- Atractus oculotemporalis Amaral, 1932 – Hispanic ground snake
- Atractus orcesi Savage, 1955
- Atractus pachacamac Melo‐Sampaio, Passos, Prudente, Venegas & Torres‐Carvajal, 2021
- Atractus paisa Passos, Fernandes & J.D. Lynch, 2009
- Atractus pamplonensis Amaral, 1937 – Pamplona ground snake
- Atractus pantostictus Fernandes & Puorto, 1993
- Atractus paraguayensis F. Werner, 1924
- Atractus paucidens Despax, 1910 – Despax's ground snake
- Atractus pauciscutatus Schmidt & Walker, 1943 – little-scaled ground snake
- Atractus paulus Melo-Sampaio & Venegas, 2023
- Atractus peruvianus (Jan, 1862) – Peru ground snake
- Atractus poeppigi (Jan, 1862) – basin ground snake
- Atractus potschi Fernandes, 1995
- Atractus punctiventris Amaral, 1933 – pointed ground snake
- Atractus resplendens F. Werner, 1901 – resplendent ground snake
- Atractus reticulatus (Boulenger, 1885) – reticulate ground snake
- Atractus riveroi Roze, 1961 – Rivero's ground snake
- Atractus ronnie Passos, Fernandes & Borges-Nojosa, 2007
- Atractus roulei Despax, 1910 – Roule's ground snake
- Atractus sanctaemartae Dunn, 1946 – St. Marta's ground snake
- Atractus sanguineus Prado, 1944 – bloody ground snake
- Atractus savagei Salazar-Valenzuela, Torres-Carvajal & Passos, 2014 – Savage's ground snake
- Atractus schach (F. Boie, 1827) – Schach's ground snake
- Atractus serranus Amaral, 1930 – Sao Paulo ground snake
- Atractus snethlageae Cunha & Nascimento, 1983
- Atractus spinalis Passos et al., 2013
- Atractus steyermarki Roze, 1958
- Atractus stygius Passos, Azevedo, Nogueira, Fernandes & Sawaya, 2019
- Atractus surucucu Prudente, 2008
- Atractus tamaensis Esqueda & La Marca, 2005
- Atractus tamessari Kok, 2006
- Atractus taphorni Schargel & García-Pérez, 2002
- Atractus tartarus Passos, Prudente & J.D. Lynch, 2016
- Atractus thalesdelemai Passos, Fernandes & Zanella, 2005
- Atractus titanicus Passos, Fernandes & J.D. Lynch, 2009
- Atractus torquatus (A.M.C. Duméril, Bibron & A.H.A. Duméril, 1854) – neckband ground snake
- Atractus touzeti Schargel et al., 2013
- Atractus trefauti Melo-Sampaio, Passos, Fouquet, Prudente & Torres-Carvajal, 2019
- Atractus trihedrurus Amaral, 1926 – southern ground snake
- Atractus trilineatus Wagler, 1828 – three-lined ground snake
- Atractus trivittatus Amaral, 1933 – three-banded ground snake
- Atractus turikensis Barros, 2000
- Atractus typhon Passos et al., 2009
- Atractus ukupacha Melo‐Sampaio, Passos, Prudente, Venegas & Torres‐Carvajal, 2021
- Atractus variegatus Prado, 1942 – variegated ground snake
- Atractus ventrimaculatus Boulenger, 1905 – speckled ground snake
- Atractus vertebralis Boulenger, 1904 – vertebral ground snake
- Atractus vertebrolineatus Prado, 1941 – striped ground snake
- Atractus vittatus Boulenger, 1894
- Atractus wagleri Prado, 1945 – Wagler's ground snake
- Atractus werneri Peracca, 1914 – Werner's ground snake
- Atractus zebrinus (Jan, 1862)
- Atractus zgap Arteaga, Quezada, Vieira, & Guayasamin, 2022
- Atractus zidoki Gasc & Rodriques, 1979 – Zidok's ground snake
