= Atractus lehmanni =

Conservation status
- Data Deficient (IUCN 3.1)

Scientific classification
- Kingdom: Animalia
- Phylum: Chordata
- Class: Reptilia
- Order: Squamata
- Suborder: Serpentes
- Family: Colubridae
- Genus: Atractus
- Species: A. lehmanni

Binomial name
- Atractus lehmanni Boettger, 1898

Species of snake

Atractus lehmanni, also known commonly as Lehmann's ground snake, is a species of snake in the subfamily Dipsadinae of the family Colubridae. The species is endemic to Colombia.

== Etymology ==
The specific name, lehmanni, is in honor of German botanist Friedrich Carl Lehmann.

== Description ==
A. lehmanni has 17 rows of dorsal scales at midbody, and eight maxillary teeth. It is uniformally dark brown dorsally.

== Habitat ==
The preferred natural habitat of A. lehmanni is unknown because much of its geographic range is disturbed, having been converted for agricultural uses.

== Behavior ==
A. lehmanni is terrestrial and fossorial.

== Reproduction ==
A. lehmanni is oviparous.

== Taxonomy ==
A. lehmanni is a member of the A. trilineatus species group.
