= Atractus emigdioi =

Conservation status
- Least Concern (IUCN 3.1)

Scientific classification
- Kingdom: Animalia
- Phylum: Chordata
- Class: Reptilia
- Order: Squamata
- Suborder: Serpentes
- Family: Colubridae
- Genus: Atractus
- Species: A. emigdioi

Binomial name
- Atractus emigdioi González-Sponga, 1971

Species of snake

Atractus emigdioi, also known commonly as Emigdio's ground snake, is a species of snake in the family Colubridae. The species is endemic to Venezuela.

== Etymology ==
The specific name, emigdioi, is in honor of Emigdio González-Sponga who collected the holotype.

== Geographic range ==
A. emigdioi is found in the Cordillera de Mérida in the Venezuelan states of Mérida and Trujillo.

== Habitat ==
The preferred natural habitat of A. emigdioi is forest, at altitudes of 2,100–3,000 m (6,900–9,800 ft).

== Behavior ==
A. emigdioi is terrestrial and semifossorial.

== Reproduction ==
A. emigdioi is oviparous.
