= Black-headed ground snake =

There are two species of snake named black-headed ground snake:

- Rhynchocalamus melanocephalus
- Atractus nigricauda
