= Savage's ground snake =

There are two species of snake named Savage's ground snake:

- Atractus savagei, found in Ecuador
- Sonora savagei, found in Mexico
