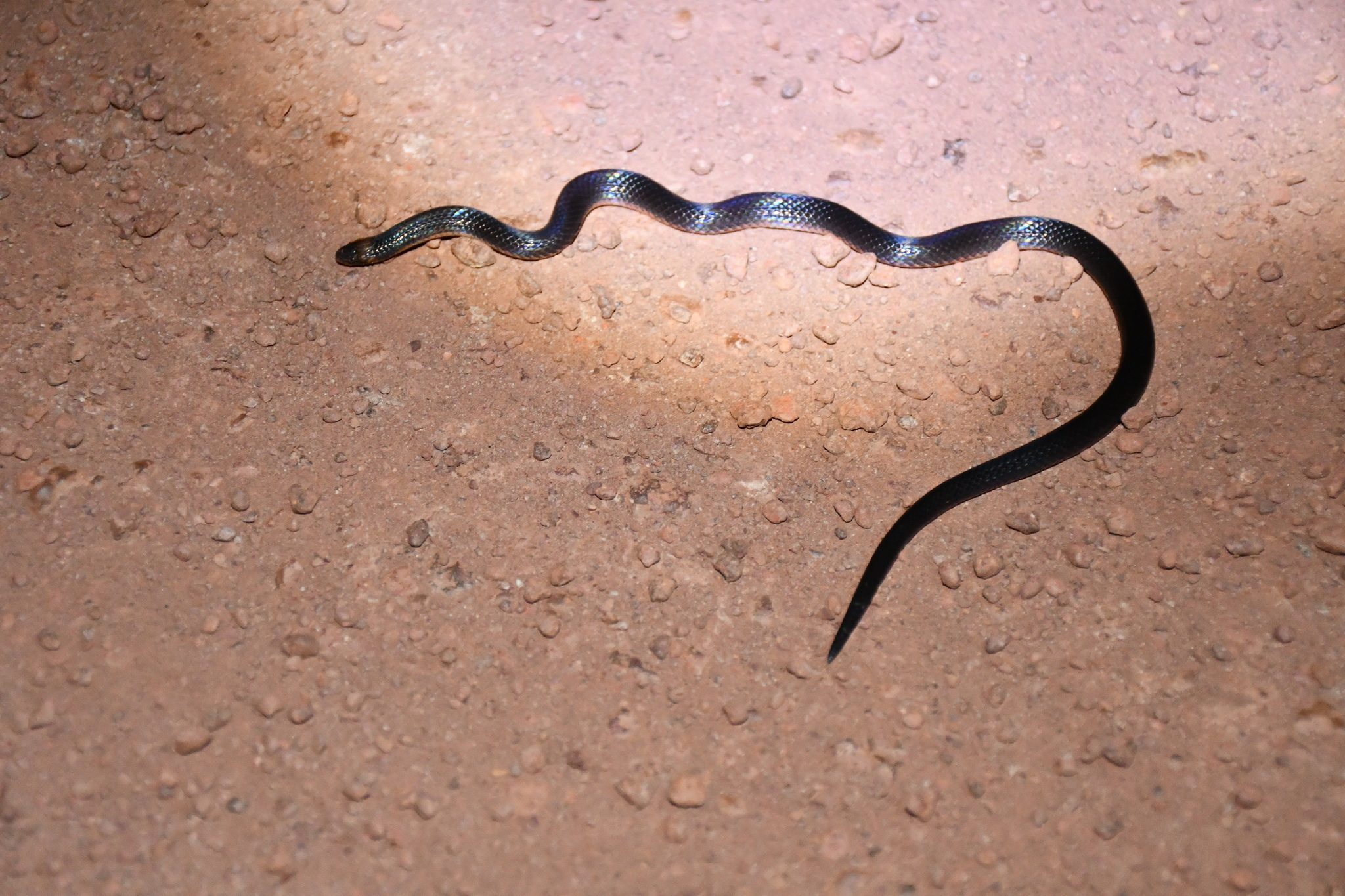
- Emmel's Ground Snake, Vaca Diez, Bolivia (2023)

Conservation status
- Least Concern (IUCN 3.1)

Scientific classification
- Kingdom: Animalia
- Phylum: Chordata
- Class: Reptilia
- Order: Squamata
- Suborder: Serpentes
- Family: Colubridae
- Genus: Atractus
- Species: A. emmeli

Binomial name
- Atractus emmeli (Boettger, 1888)

Synonyms
- Geophis emmeli Boettger, 1888; Atractus emmeli — Boulenger, 1894; Atractus boettgeri Boulenger, 1896; Atractus balzani Boulenger, 1898; Atractus taeniatus Griffin, 1916; Atractus paravertebralis Henle & Ehrl, 1991; Atractus occiptoalbus — Fugler & Cabot, 1995; Atractus emmeli — Nogueira et al., 2019

= Atractus emmeli =

Species of snake

Atractus emmeli, also known commonly as Emmel's ground snake and Boettger's ground snake, is a species of snake in the family Colubridae. The species is native to northwestern South America.

== Etymology ==
The specific name, emmeli, is in honor of Ferdinand Emmel who sent the first two specimens of this snake to German herpetologist Oskar Boettger, which Boettger described as a species new to science.

== Geographic range ==
A. emmeli is found in Bolivia and Peru, east of the Andes.

== Habitat ==
The preferred natural habitat of A. emmeli is forest, at altitudes of 134–360 m (440–1,181 ft), but it is also found in artificial habitats such as gardens and farms.

== Description ==
A. emmeli may attain a snout-to-vent length (SVL) of about 38 cm (15 in) for females, and about 30 cm (12 in) for males. Dorsally, it is uniformly light brown, dark brown, or black. Often there is a whitish or tan band across the parietals, especially in juveniles. Ventrally, it is cream-colored, with black spots or dots. It has smooth dorsal scales, without apical pits. The dorsal scales are arranged in 15 rows throughout the length of the body (15/15/15). The ventrals number 154–187 in females, and 147–169 in males. The subcaudals number 14–25 in females, and 20–31 in males.

== Behavior ==
A. emmeli is terrestrial and fossorial.

== Reproduction ==
A. emmeli is oviparous.
