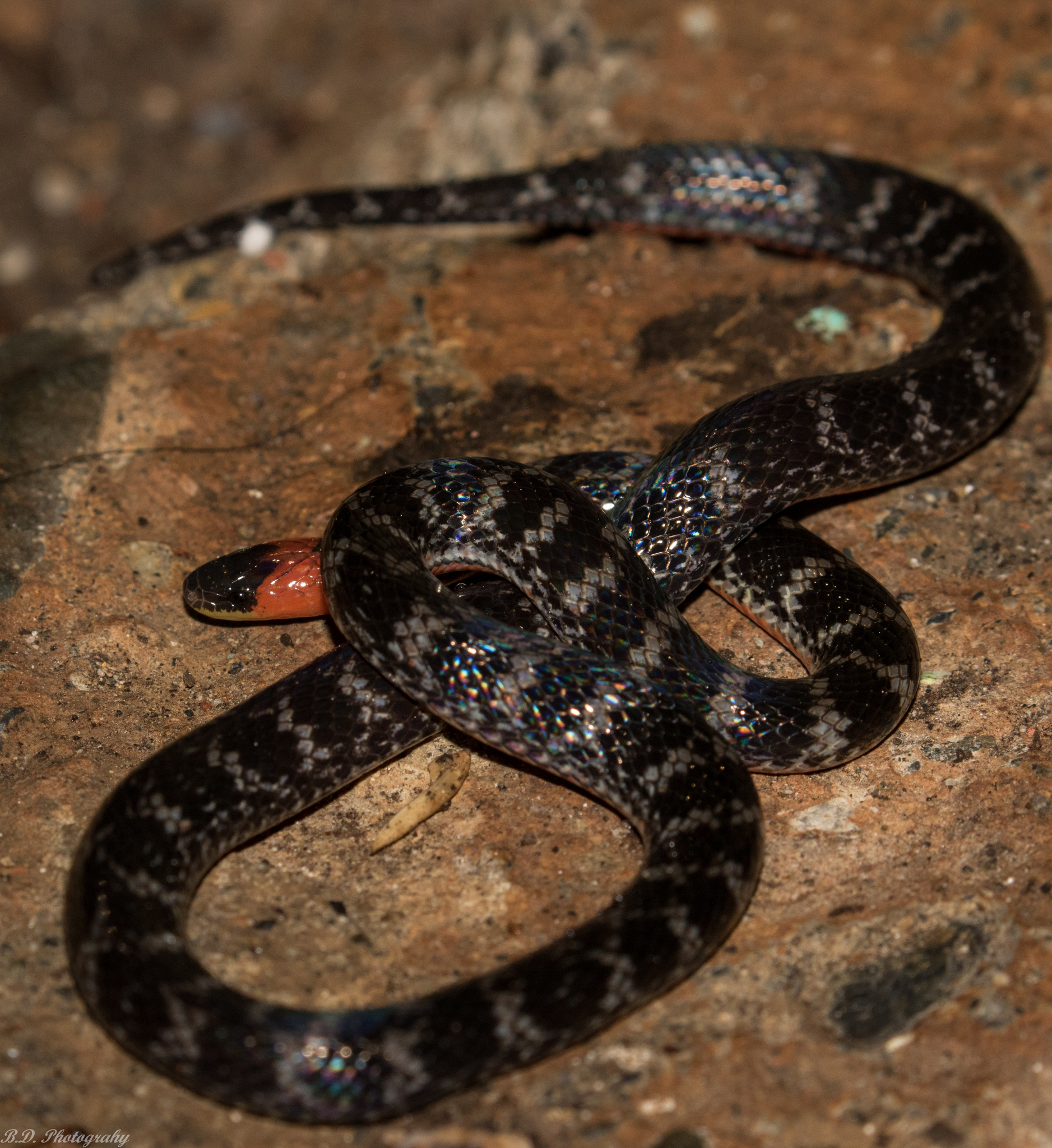

Conservation status
- Least Concern (IUCN 3.1)

Scientific classification
- Kingdom: Animalia
- Phylum: Chordata
- Class: Reptilia
- Order: Squamata
- Suborder: Serpentes
- Family: Colubridae
- Genus: Atractus
- Species: A. clarki

Binomial name
- Atractus clarki Dunn & Bailey, 1939

= Atractus clarki =

Species of snake

Atractus clarki, Clark's ground snake, is a rare species of snake in the family Colubridae. It is one of only five species of the very diverse (>150 species) genus Atractus that enters political North America.

== Distribution ==
The species can be found in extreme southern Panama, the Pacific coast of Colombia and northwestern Ecuador. The species was first collected in 1938 from Santa Cruz de Cana, a 16th century gold mine on the eastern flank of the Serranía de Pirre mountains close to the Colombian border. A second specimen from adjacent Colombia was collected in 1919 but not correctly identified until 2003. The species is now known from numerous records in Ecuador and Colombia.

== Biology ==
Atractus clarki is a small, nocturnal species that preys mainly on soil-dwelling invertebrates like earthworms. This snake is characterized by its brown dorsal pattern and lighter ventral side, with a bright red collar around its neck and head that they rely on as a defense tactic towards predators. Atractus clarki may represent a relatively ancestral form based on the shape of its reproductive organs. The specific physical appearance of Atractus clarki differs between male and female. Females are typically larger than males, with males having slightly different dorsal patterns. The species is found in warm, humid climates among soil and leaf litter. It is oviparous.

=== Conservation status ===
The International Union for Conservation of Nature (IUCN) has classified this species as Least Concern because of its stable population in the lowlands of valley regions.

== Etymology ==
It is named in honor of Herbert C. Clark, instigator of the Panamanian snake census and first director of the Gorgas Memorial Laboratory.
