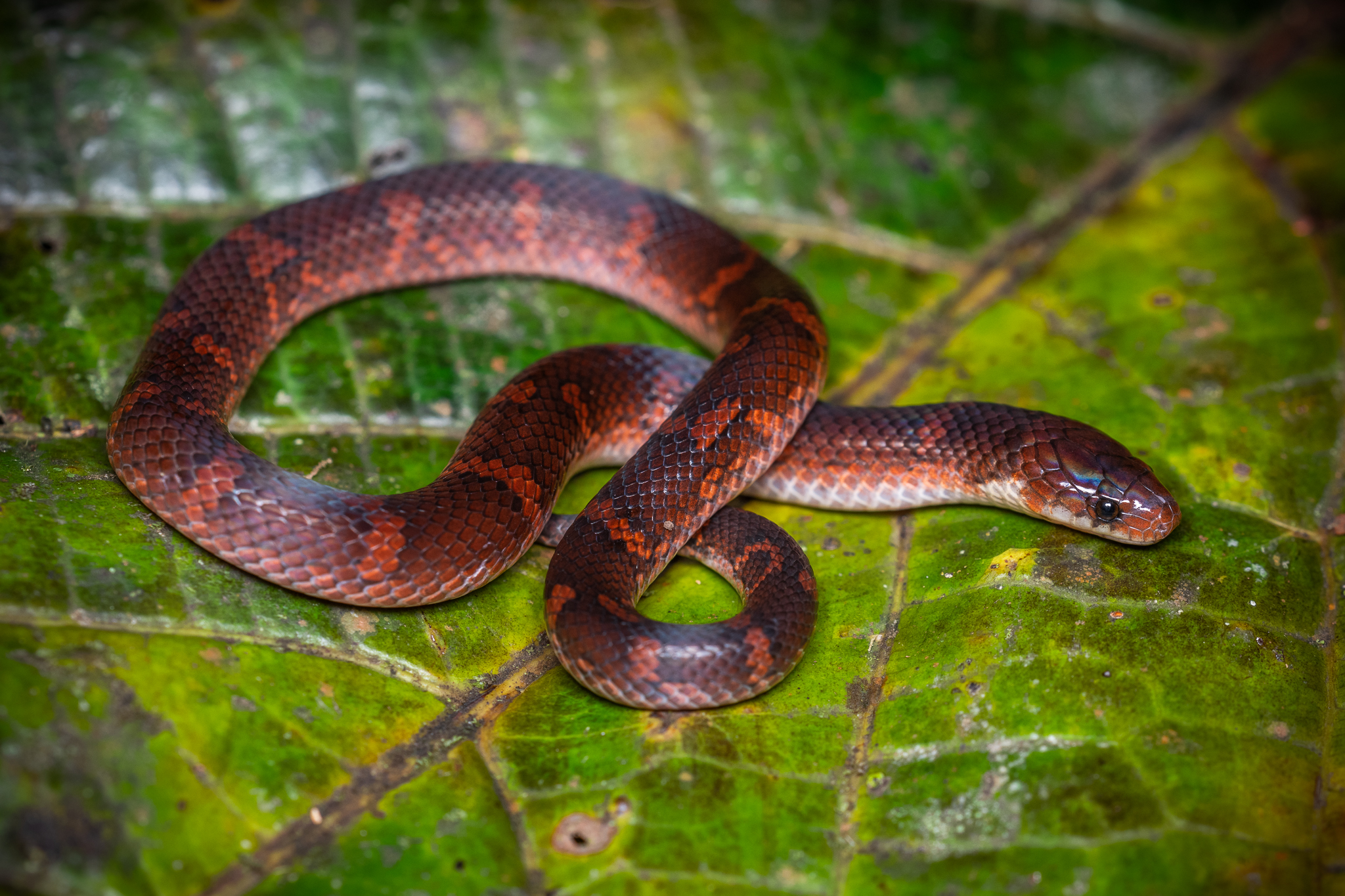

Conservation status
- Least Concern (IUCN 3.1)

Scientific classification
- Kingdom: Animalia
- Phylum: Chordata
- Class: Reptilia
- Order: Squamata
- Suborder: Serpentes
- Family: Colubridae
- Genus: Atractus
- Species: A. flammigerus

Binomial name
- Atractus flammigerus (F. Boie, 1827)

Synonyms
- Brachyorrhos flammigerus Boie, 1827

= Atractus flammigerus =

Species of reptile

Atractus flammigerus, is a species of colubrid snake. It is endemic to the eastern part of the Guiana Shield. It is also known as the flaming ground snake.

== Habitat and geographic range ==
Atractus flammigerus is found in the eastern part of the Guiana Shield in Suriname, Brazil, and French Guiana. It occurs in lowland rainforest at elevations below 600 m (2,000 ft).
