= Atractus franciscopaivai =

Conservation status
- Data Deficient (IUCN 3.1)

Scientific classification
- Kingdom: Animalia
- Phylum: Chordata
- Class: Reptilia
- Order: Squamata
- Suborder: Serpentes
- Family: Colubridae
- Genus: Atractus
- Species: A. franciscopaivai

Binomial name
- Atractus franciscopaivai Silva Haad, 2004

Species of snake

Atractus franciscopaivai is a species of snake in the family Colubridae. The species is endemic to Colombia.

== Etymology ==
The specific name, franciscopaivai, is in honor of Brazilian herpetologist Francisco Paiva do Nascimento.

== Geographic range ==
A. franciscopaivai is found in Amazonas Department and Vaupés Department, southeastern Colombia.

== Habitat ==
The preferred natural habitat of A. franciscopaivai is tropical rainforest, at altitudes of 100–300 m (330–980 ft).

== Description ==
A. franciscopaviai has five upper labials and five lower labials. The dorsal scales are arranged in 15 rows throughout the length of the body. The tail is short and is rounded at the tip.

== Reproduction ==
A. franciscopaivai is oviparous.
