= Atractus thalesdelemai =

Conservation status
- Endangered (IUCN 3.1)

Scientific classification
- Kingdom: Animalia
- Phylum: Chordata
- Class: Reptilia
- Order: Squamata
- Suborder: Serpentes
- Family: Colubridae
- Genus: Atractus
- Species: A. thalesdelemai

Binomial name
- Atractus thalesdelemai Passos, Fernandes, & Zanella, 2005

Species of snake

Atractus thalesdelemai is a species of snake in the family Colubridae. The species can be found in Brazil.
