= Atractus turikensis =

Conservation status
- Least Concern (IUCN 3.1)

Scientific classification
- Kingdom: Animalia
- Phylum: Chordata
- Class: Reptilia
- Order: Squamata
- Suborder: Serpentes
- Family: Colubridae
- Genus: Atractus
- Species: A. turikensis

Binomial name
- Atractus turikensis Barros, 2000

Species of snake

Atractus turikensis is a species of snake in the family Colubridae. The species can be found in Colombia and Venezuela.
