= Atractus medusa =

Conservation status
- Data Deficient (IUCN 3.1)

Scientific classification
- Kingdom: Animalia
- Phylum: Chordata
- Class: Reptilia
- Order: Squamata
- Suborder: Serpentes
- Family: Colubridae
- Genus: Atractus
- Species: A. medusa

Binomial name
- Atractus medusa Passos, Mueses-Cisneros, Lynch & Fernandes, 2009

Species of snake

Atractus medusa is a species of snake in the subfamily Dipsadinae of the family Colubridae. The species is native to northwestern South America.

== Etymology ==
The specific name, medusa, refers to the Greek mythological female monster, Medusa, who had venomous snakes for hair.

== Geographic distribution ==
Atractus medusa is found in Colombia and Ecuador.

== Habitat ==
The preferred natural habitat of Atractus medusa is forest, at elevations from sea level to 550 m (1,800 ft).

== Behavior ==
Atractus medusa is terrestrial.

== Reproduction ==
The mode of reproduction of Atractus medusa is unknown.
