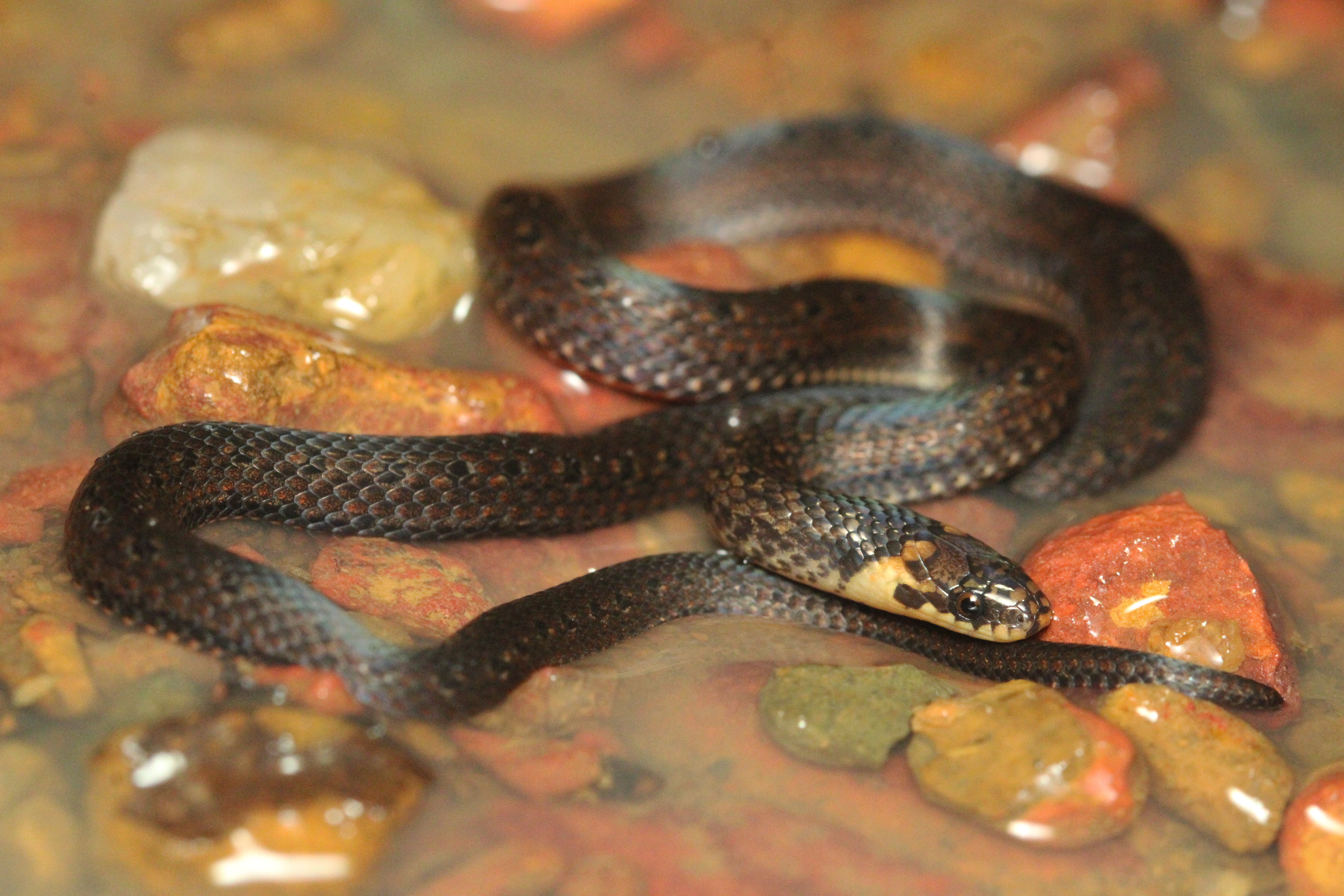

Conservation status
- Least Concern (IUCN 3.1)

Scientific classification
- Kingdom: Animalia
- Phylum: Chordata
- Class: Reptilia
- Order: Squamata
- Suborder: Serpentes
- Family: Colubridae
- Genus: Atractus
- Species: A. zidoki

Binomial name
- Atractus zidoki Gasc & Rodrigues, 1979

= Atractus zidoki =

Species of snake

Atractus zidoki, Zidok's ground snake, is a species of snake in the family Colubridae. The species can be found in Brazil, French Guiana, and Colombia.
