= Atractus michaelsabini =

Scientific classification
- Kingdom: Animalia
- Phylum: Chordata
- Class: Reptilia
- Order: Squamata
- Suborder: Serpentes
- Family: Colubridae
- Genus: Atractus
- Species: A. michaelsabini

Binomial name
- Atractus michaelsabini Arteaga, Quezada, Vieira, & Guayasamin, 2022

Species of snake

Atractus michaelsabini is a species of snake in the family Colubridae. The species can be found in Ecuador.
