= Atractus torquatus =

Conservation status
- Least Concern (IUCN 3.1)

Scientific classification
- Kingdom: Animalia
- Phylum: Chordata
- Class: Reptilia
- Order: Squamata
- Suborder: Serpentes
- Family: Colubridae
- Genus: Atractus
- Species: A. torquatus

Binomial name
- Atractus torquatus (A.M.C. Duméril, Bibron & A.H.A. Duméril, 1854)

Species of snake

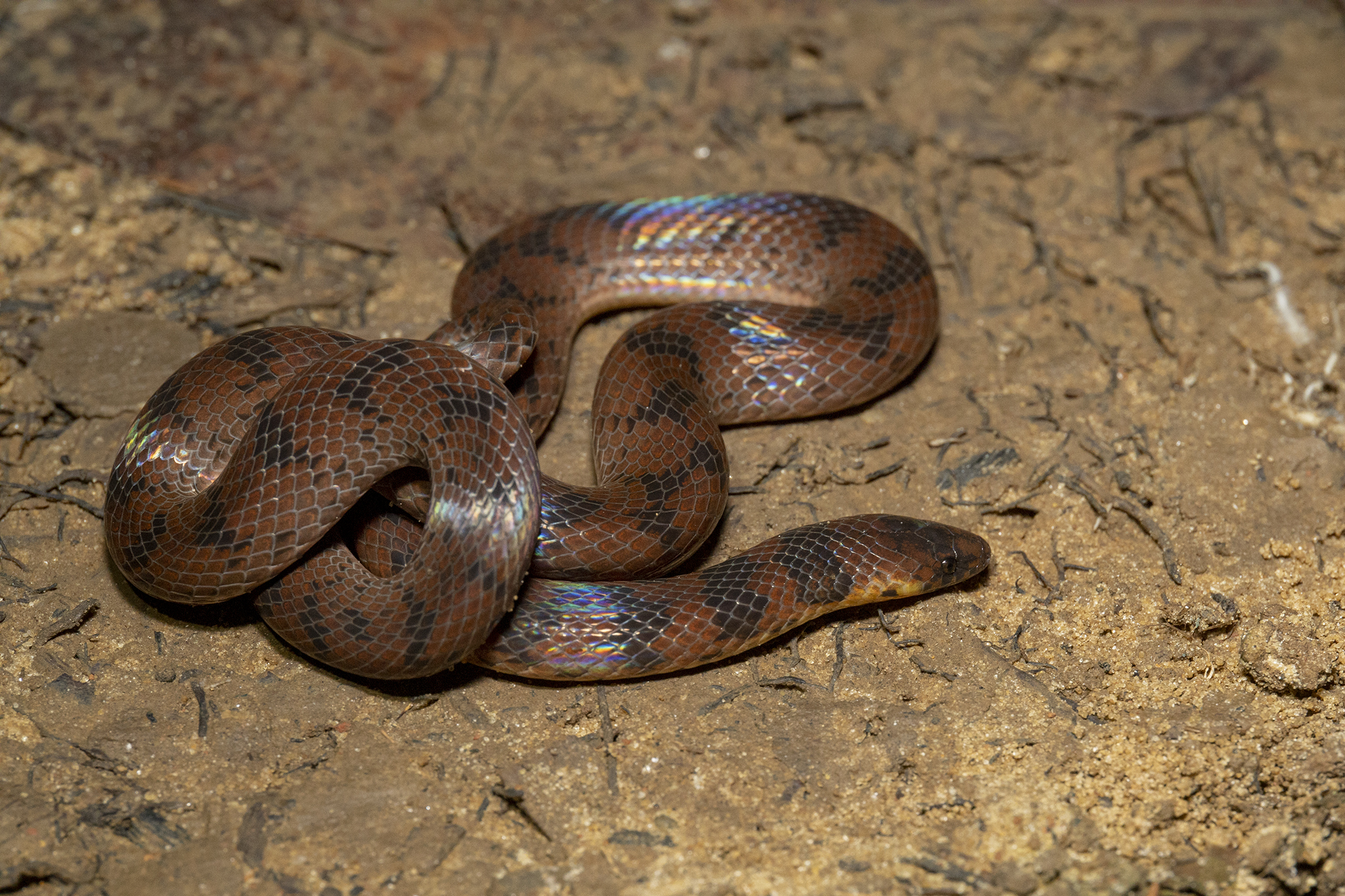
Neckband Ground Snake (Atractus torquatus) in Colombia

Atractus torquatus, the neckband ground snake, is a species of snake in the family Colubridae. The species can be found in Colombia, Bolivia, Brazil, Peru, Venezuela, French Guiana, Guyana, and Ecuador.
