= Atractus pantostictus =

- In Brazil, 2013

Conservation status
- Least Concern (IUCN 3.1)

Scientific classification
- Kingdom: Animalia
- Phylum: Chordata
- Class: Reptilia
- Order: Squamata
- Suborder: Serpentes
- Family: Colubridae
- Genus: Atractus
- Species: A. pantostictus

Binomial name
- Atractus pantostictus Fernandes & Puorto, 1993

Species of snake

Atractus pantostictus is a species of snake in the family Colubridae.

The common name for this species in Portuguese is cobra-da-terra or fura-terra.

The species can be found in south eastern part of Brazil. One study found the species occurring in rainforests.
