= Atractus mariselae =

Conservation status
- Least Concern (IUCN 3.1)

Scientific classification
- Kingdom: Animalia
- Phylum: Chordata
- Class: Reptilia
- Order: Squamata
- Suborder: Serpentes
- Family: Colubridae
- Genus: Atractus
- Species: A. mariselae

Binomial name
- Atractus mariselae Lancini, 1969

Species of snake

Atractus mariselae, also known commonly as Marisela's ground snake, is a species of snake in the subfamily Dipsadinae of the family Colubridae. The species is endemic to Venezuela.

== Etymology ==
The specific name, mariselae, is in honor of Marisela Urosa Zambrano.

== Geographic range ==
Atractus mariselae is found in northwestern Venezuela, in the Venezuelan state of Trujillo.

== Habitat ==
The preferred natural habitat of Atractus mariselae is forest, at altitudes of 1,200–1,800 m (3,900–5,900 ft), but it has also been found in artificial habitats, including coffee plantations, gardens, and pastures.

== Reproduction ==
Atractus mariselae is oviparous. Adult females lay eggs in communal nests, which are shared with other species of Atractus and may contain more than 350 eggs.
