= Atractus microrhynchus =

Conservation status
- Vulnerable (IUCN 3.1)

Scientific classification
- Kingdom: Animalia
- Phylum: Chordata
- Class: Reptilia
- Order: Squamata
- Suborder: Serpentes
- Family: Colubridae
- Genus: Atractus
- Species: A. microrhynchus

Binomial name
- Atractus microrhynchus (Cope, 1868)

Species of snake

Atractus microrhynchus is a species of snake in the family Colubridae. The species can be found in Ecuador and Peru. It was described in 1868 by Edward Drinker Cope, an American zoologist.
