= Atractus snethlageae =

Conservation status
- Least Concern (IUCN 3.1)

Scientific classification
- Kingdom: Animalia
- Phylum: Chordata
- Class: Reptilia
- Order: Squamata
- Suborder: Serpentes
- Family: Colubridae
- Genus: Atractus
- Species: A. snethlageae

Binomial name
- Atractus snethlageae Cunha & Nascimento, 1983

Species of snake

Atractus snethlageae is a species of snake in the family Colubridae. The species can be found in Brazil, Suriname, Colombia, Bolivia, Peru, Ecuador, and Argentina. This ground snake is non venomous and known to be the most diversified, species-rich, and taxonomically complex radiation of the suborder Serpentes.
