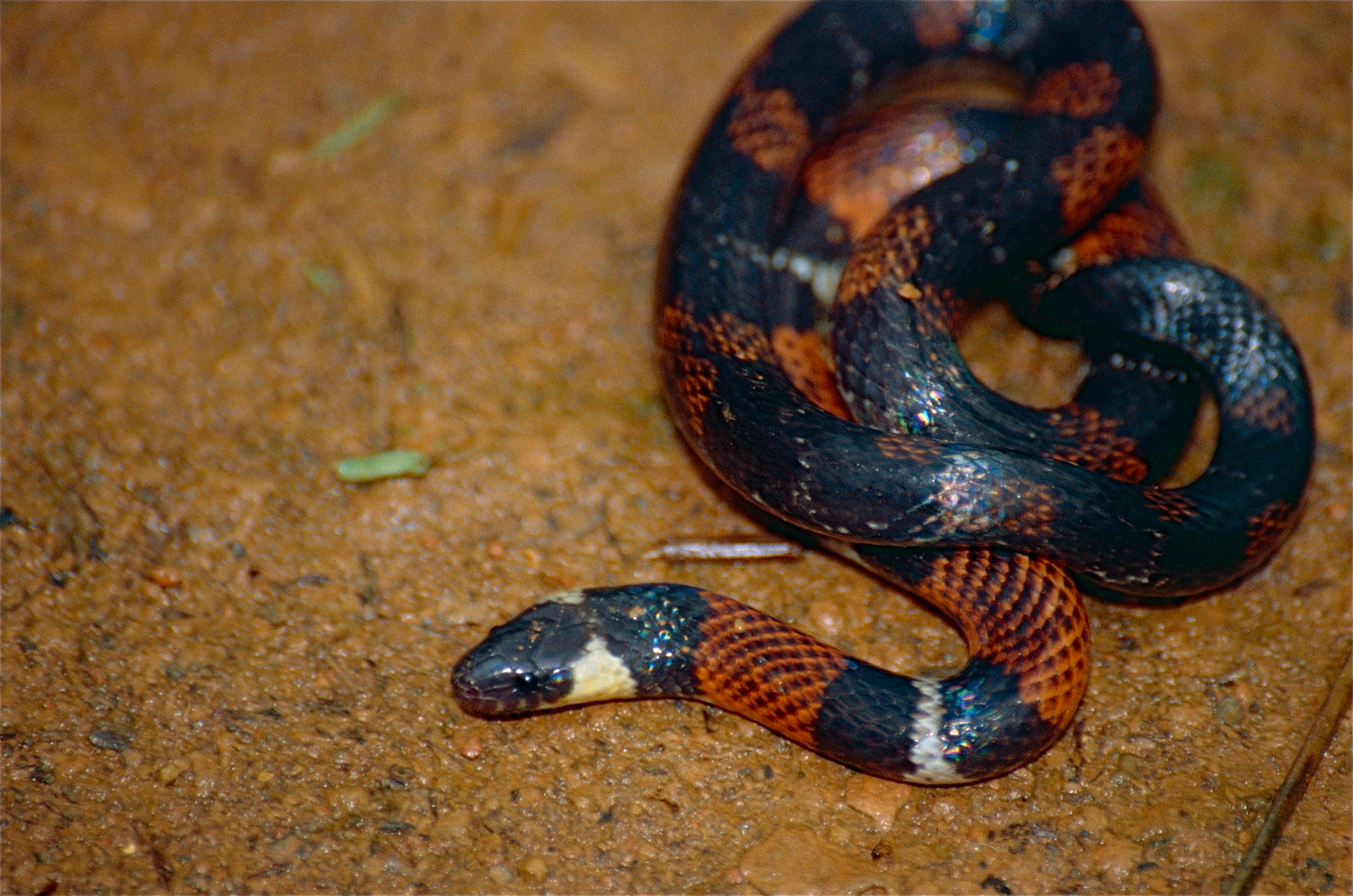

Conservation status
- Least Concern (IUCN 3.1)

Scientific classification
- Kingdom: Animalia
- Phylum: Chordata
- Class: Reptilia
- Order: Squamata
- Suborder: Serpentes
- Family: Colubridae
- Genus: Atractus
- Species: A. badius

Binomial name
- Atractus badius (Boie, 1827)

= Atractus badius =

Species of snake

Boie's ground snake (Atractus badius) is a nocturnal and semi-fossorial snake species in the Colubridae family. Like the other members of the Atractus genus, its diet is composed predominantly of earthworms, which it actively hunts in the leaf litter of the primary and secondary rainforests it inhabits. The IUCN lists the species as 'Least Concern' because of its wide distribution, including in protected areas.

== Description ==
On average, Boie's ground snake reaches a length of 25-40 cm. Its basic color pattern consist of light yellow rings enclosed by two dark grey bands that contrast against a red background. The head is grey whereas on the neck, two white triangles are present. The belly is off-white with irregular black spots. In adults, the colored bands often fade and turn the snake dark grey, in particular its tail end. The species is nocturnal, terrestrial, and semi-fossorial, and is often encountered under wood debris, decomposing tree trunks, or even in old termite nests.

== Distribution ==
The species is distributed across the Guiana Shield. and can be found in Colombia, Suriname, French Guiana, Peru, and Brazilian Amazonia. It may also possibly occur in Venezuela. According to the British Herpetological Society, the species was mistakenly thought to occur in Argentina because a specimen was found in Las Palmas.

== Reproduction ==
The species is oviparous and lays on average three to five eggs in January.

== Common names ==
In English, the species is known as St. Marta's ground snake, Dunn's ground snake, French Guyana ground snake, and Boie's ground snake. In Portuguese, the species is known as fura-terra or cobra-da-terra.
