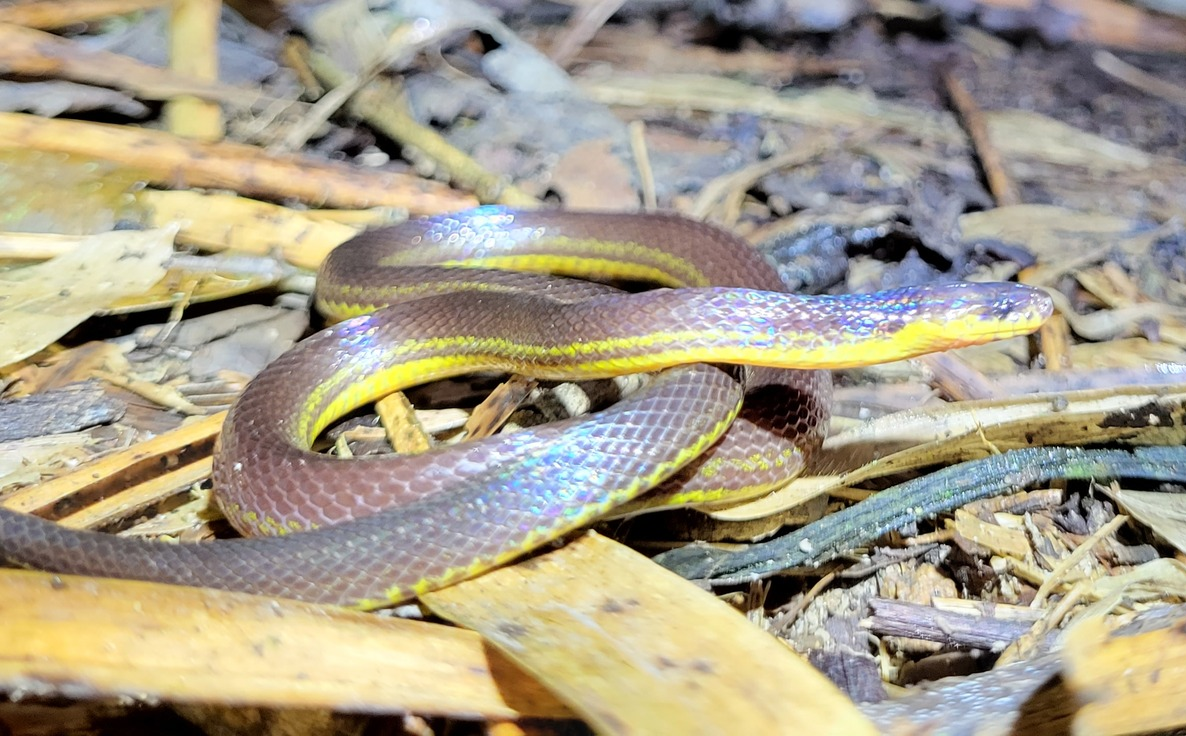

Conservation status
- Vulnerable (IUCN 3.1)

Scientific classification
- Kingdom: Animalia
- Phylum: Chordata
- Class: Reptilia
- Order: Squamata
- Suborder: Serpentes
- Family: Colubridae
- Genus: Atractus
- Species: A. modestus

Binomial name
- Atractus modestus Boulenger, 1894

= Atractus modestus =

Species of snake

Atractus modestus is a species of snake in the family Colubridae. In English the species goes by the common name modest ground snake while in Spanish it goes by tierrera modesta or culebra tierrera modesta.

Males can grow to 27.3 cm (10.7 in) and females to 32.8 cm (12.9 in) in snout–vent length. The species reproduces sexually. The species has been labeled as vulnerable by the IUCN.

The species can be found in western Ecuador. It is locally frequent in Mindo, Ecuador. The species has been reported in elevations at 1019 m to 1780 m or 2,400–2,560 m (7,870–8,400 ft) above sea level.
