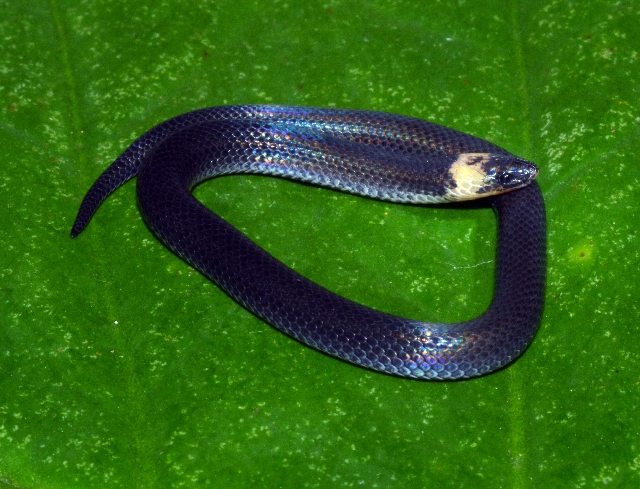

Conservation status
- Near Threatened (IUCN 3.1)

Scientific classification
- Kingdom: Animalia
- Phylum: Chordata
- Class: Reptilia
- Order: Squamata
- Suborder: Serpentes
- Family: Colubridae
- Genus: Atractus
- Species: A. occipitoalbus

Binomial name
- Atractus occipitoalbus (Jan, 1862)

= Atractus occipitoalbus =

Species of snake

Atractus occipitoalbus, the gray ground snake, is a species of snake in the family Colubridae. The species can be found in Ecuador, Bolivia, Peru, and Colombia.

== Diet ==
Gray ground snakes eat earthworms.
