= Atractus atlas =

Scientific classification
- Kingdom: Animalia
- Phylum: Chordata
- Class: Reptilia
- Order: Squamata
- Suborder: Serpentes
- Family: Colubridae
- Genus: Atractus
- Species: A. atlas

Binomial name
- Atractus atlas Passos, Scanferla, Melo-Sampaio, Brito, & Almendariz, 2018

Species of snake

Atractus atlas, the atlas ground snake, is a species of snake in the family Colubridae. The species can be found in Ecuador. It probably eats earthworms and slugs.
