= Atractus loveridgei =

Conservation status
- Data Deficient (IUCN 3.1)

Scientific classification
- Kingdom: Animalia
- Phylum: Chordata
- Class: Reptilia
- Order: Squamata
- Suborder: Serpentes
- Family: Colubridae
- Genus: Atractus
- Species: A. loveridgei

Binomial name
- Atractus loveridgei Amaral, 1930

Species of snake

Atractus loveridgei, also known commonly as Loveridge's ground snake, is a species of snake in the subfamily Dipsadinae of the family Colubridae. The species is endemic to Colombia.

== Etymology ==
The specific name, loveridgei, is in honor of herpetologist Arthur Loveridge.

== Geographic range ==
Atractus loveridgei is found in Antioquia Department, Colombia.

== Behavior ==
Atractus loveridgei is terrestrial and fossorial.

== Reproduction ==
Atractus loveridgei is oviparous.
