= Atractus marthae =

Scientific classification
- Kingdom: Animalia
- Phylum: Chordata
- Class: Reptilia
- Order: Squamata
- Suborder: Serpentes
- Family: Colubridae
- Genus: Atractus
- Species: A. marthae

Binomial name
- Atractus marthae Meneses-Pelayo & Passos, 2019

Species of snake

Atractus marthae is a species of snake in the family Colubridae. The species can be found in Colombia.
