= Atractus touzeti =

Conservation status
- Data Deficient (IUCN 3.1)

Scientific classification
- Kingdom: Animalia
- Phylum: Chordata
- Class: Reptilia
- Order: Squamata
- Suborder: Serpentes
- Family: Colubridae
- Genus: Atractus
- Species: A. touzeti

Binomial name
- Atractus touzeti Schargel, Lamar, Passos, Valencia, Cisneros-Heredia, & Campbell, 2013

Species of snake

Atractus touzeti is a species of snake in the family Colubridae. The species can be found in Ecuador.
