= Atractus heliobelluomini =

Conservation status
- Data Deficient (IUCN 3.1)

Scientific classification
- Kingdom: Animalia
- Phylum: Chordata
- Class: Reptilia
- Order: Squamata
- Suborder: Serpentes
- Family: Colubridae
- Genus: Atractus
- Species: A. heliobelluomini

Binomial name
- Atractus heliobelluomini Silva Haad, 2004

Species of snake

Atractus heliobelluomini is a species of snake in the family Colubridae found in Colombia.
