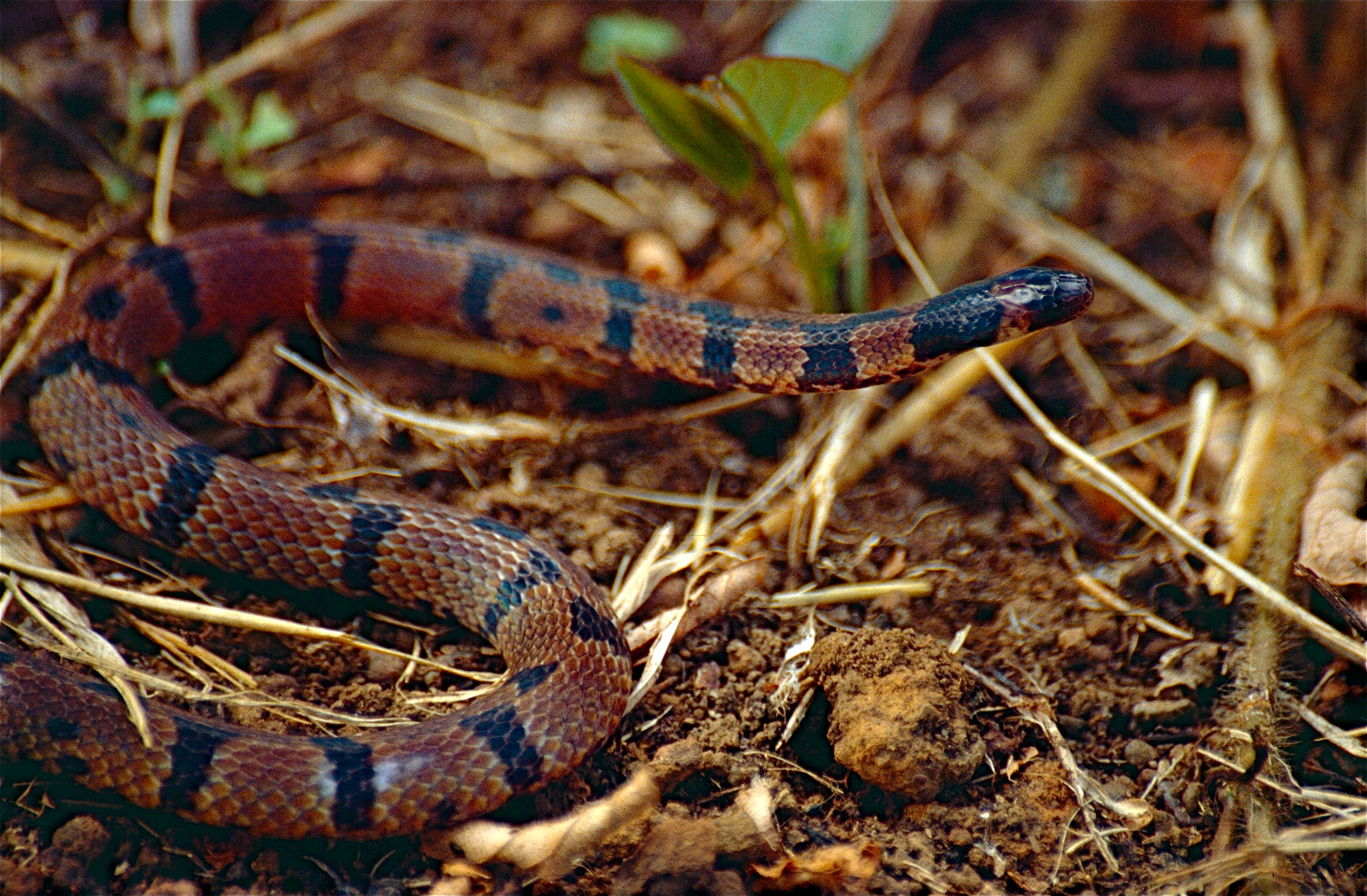

Conservation status
- Least Concern (IUCN 3.1)

Scientific classification
- Kingdom: Animalia
- Phylum: Chordata
- Class: Reptilia
- Order: Squamata
- Suborder: Serpentes
- Family: Colubridae
- Genus: Atractus
- Species: A. schach

Binomial name
- Atractus schach (F. Boie, 1827)

= Atractus schach =

Species of reptile

Atractus schach, is a species of colubrid snake. It is found in French Guiana, Guyana, and Suriname. It is also known as Schach's ground snake.
