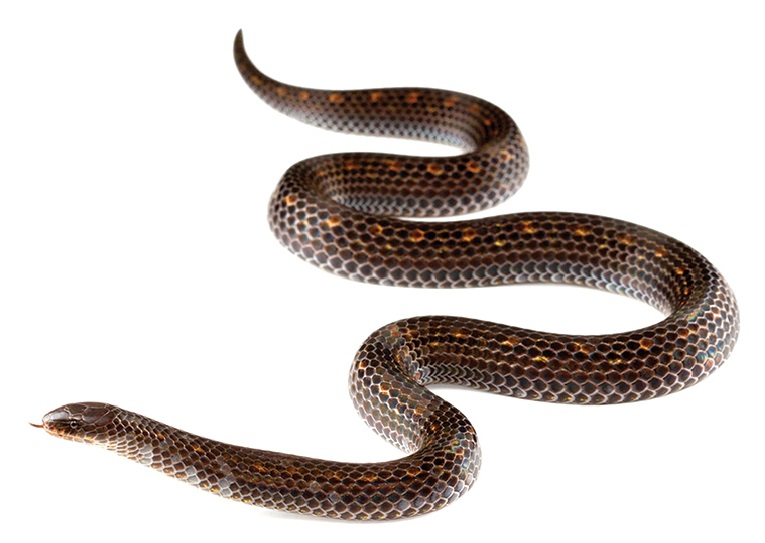

Conservation status
- Endangered (IUCN 3.1)

Scientific classification
- Kingdom: Animalia
- Phylum: Chordata
- Class: Reptilia
- Order: Squamata
- Suborder: Serpentes
- Family: Colubridae
- Genus: Atractus
- Species: A. duboisi

Binomial name
- Atractus duboisi (Boulenger, 1880)

= Atractus duboisi =

Species of snake

Atractus duboisi is a species of snake in the family Colubridae. The species can be found in Ecuador.
