= Atractus elaps =

Conservation status
- Least Concern (IUCN 3.1)

Scientific classification
- Kingdom: Animalia
- Phylum: Chordata
- Class: Reptilia
- Order: Squamata
- Suborder: Serpentes
- Family: Colubridae
- Genus: Atractus
- Species: A. elaps

Binomial name
- Atractus elaps (Günther, 1858)

Species of snake

Atractus elaps, the black ground snake, is a species of snake in the family Colubridae. The species can be found in Colombia, Venezuela, Bolivia, Peru, Ecuador, and Brazil.
