= Atractus gigas =

Conservation status
- Near Threatened (IUCN 3.1)

Scientific classification
- Kingdom: Animalia
- Phylum: Chordata
- Class: Reptilia
- Order: Squamata
- Suborder: Serpentes
- Family: Colubridae
- Genus: Atractus
- Species: A. gigas

Binomial name
- Atractus gigas Myers & Schargel, 2006

Species of snake

Atractus gigas, the giant ground snake, is a species of snake in the family Colubridae. The species can be found in Ecuador and Peru.
