= Atractus fuliginosus =

Conservation status
- Data Deficient (IUCN 3.1)

Scientific classification
- Kingdom: Animalia
- Phylum: Chordata
- Class: Reptilia
- Order: Squamata
- Suborder: Serpentes
- Family: Colubridae
- Genus: Atractus
- Species: A. fuliginosus

Binomial name
- Atractus fuliginosus (Hallowell, 1845)

Species of snake

Atractus fuliginosus, Hallowell's ground snake, is a species of snake in the family Colubridae. The species can be found in Venezuela and Tobago.
