= Atractus lasallei =

Conservation status
- Least Concern (IUCN 3.1)

Scientific classification
- Kingdom: Animalia
- Phylum: Chordata
- Class: Reptilia
- Order: Squamata
- Suborder: Serpentes
- Family: Colubridae
- Genus: Atractus
- Species: A. lasallei

Binomial name
- Atractus lasallei Amaral, 1931

Species of snake

Atractus lasallei, also known commonly as Lasalle's ground snake, is a species of snake in the subfamily Dipsadinae of the family Colubridae. The species is endemic to Colombia.

== Etymology ==
The specific name, lasallei, refers to the Instituto de La Salle, Bogotá, Colombia.

== Geographic range ==
A. lasallei is found in northwestern Colombia, in Antioquia Department.

== Habitat ==
The preferred natural habitat of A. lasallei is forest, at altitudes of 1,500–2,300 m (4,900–7,500 ft).

== Reproduction ==
A. lasallei is oviparous.
