= Atractus erythromelas =

Conservation status
- Least Concern (IUCN 3.1)

Scientific classification
- Kingdom: Animalia
- Phylum: Chordata
- Class: Reptilia
- Order: Squamata
- Suborder: Serpentes
- Family: Colubridae
- Genus: Atractus
- Species: A. erythromelas

Binomial name
- Atractus erythromelas Boulenger, 1903

Species of snake

Atractus erythromelas, the red-black ground snake, is a species of snake in the family Colubridae. The species can be found in Venezuela and Colombia.
