= Atractus bocki =

Conservation status
- Data Deficient (IUCN 3.1)

Scientific classification
- Kingdom: Animalia
- Phylum: Chordata
- Class: Reptilia
- Order: Squamata
- Suborder: Serpentes
- Family: Colubridae
- Genus: Atractus
- Species: A. bocki

Binomial name
- Atractus bocki Werner, 1909

Species of snake

Atractus bocki, Bock's ground snake, is a species of snake in the family Colubridae. The species can be found from Bolivia to Argentina.
