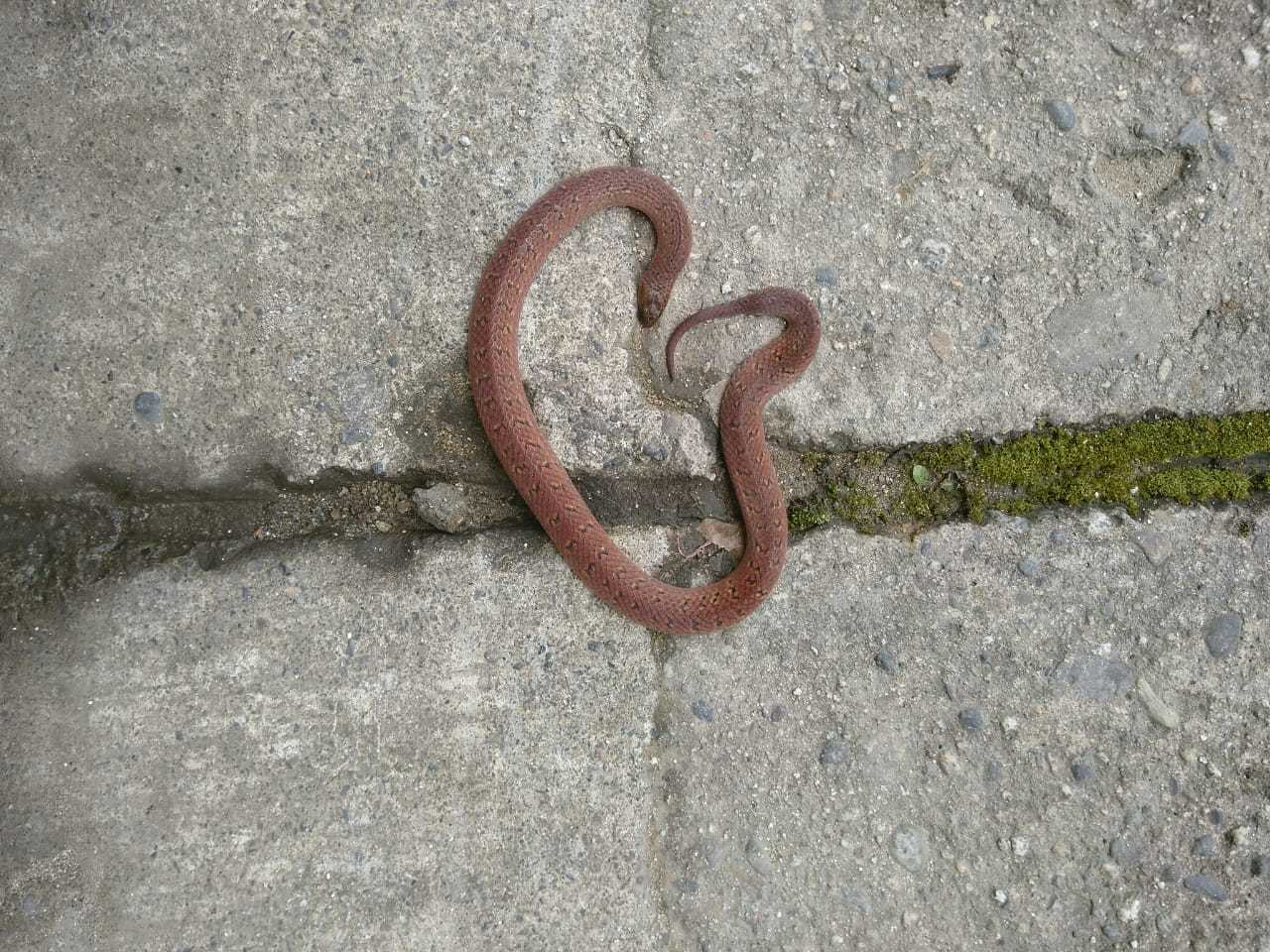

Conservation status
- Vulnerable (IUCN 3.1)

Scientific classification
- Kingdom: Animalia
- Phylum: Chordata
- Class: Reptilia
- Order: Squamata
- Suborder: Serpentes
- Family: Colubridae
- Genus: Atractus
- Species: A. nicefori

Binomial name
- Atractus nicefori Amaral, 1930

= Atractus nicefori =

Species of snake

Atractus nicefori, also known commonly as the northern ground snake, is a species of snake in the subfamily Dipsadinae of the family Colubridae. The species is endemic to Colombia.

== Etymology ==
The specific name, nicefori, is in honor of missionary Brother Nicéforo María, born Antoine Rouhaire in France, who established a natural history museum in Medellín, Colombia.

== Geographic distribution ==
Atractus nicefori is found in Antioquia Department, Colombia.

== Habitat ==
The preferred natural habitat of Atractus nicefori is forest, at elevations of 2,000–2,500 m (6,600–8,200 ft).

== Behavior ==
Atractus nicefori is terrestrial and fossorial.

== Reproduction ==
Atractus nicefori is oviparous.
