= Atractus obtusirostris =

Conservation status
- Data Deficient (IUCN 3.1)

Scientific classification
- Kingdom: Animalia
- Phylum: Chordata
- Class: Reptilia
- Order: Squamata
- Suborder: Serpentes
- Family: Colubridae
- Genus: Atractus
- Species: A. obtusirostris

Binomial name
- Atractus obtusirostris (Werner, 1916)

Species of snake

Atractus obtusirostris, the bignose ground snake, is a species of snake in the family Colubridae. The species can be found in Colombia.
