= Atractus zgap =

Scientific classification
- Kingdom: Animalia
- Phylum: Chordata
- Class: Reptilia
- Order: Squamata
- Suborder: Serpentes
- Family: Colubridae
- Genus: Atractus
- Species: A. zgap

Binomial name
- Atractus zgap Arteaga, Quezada, Vieira, & Guayasamin, 2022

Species of snake

Atractus zgap is a species of snake in the family Colubridae. The species can be found in Ecuador.

== Taxonomy ==
The species was described as Atractus zgap and assigned to the genus Atractus, following the morphological and phylogenetic criteria established by Jay Savage (1960).

The specific epithet zgap is a noun in apposition and honors the Zoological Society for the Conservation of Species and Populations (ZGAP), which supports conservation efforts for poorly known and highly endangered species. ZGAP funded the fieldwork that led to the discovery of this species.

== Description ==
Atractus zgap is a small snake with smooth dorsal scales arranged in 17 rows. It has two postocular scales, a loreal scale about twice as long as high, and a 1+2 temporal arrangement. The species has seven supralabial scales (third and fourth contacting the eye), seven infralabial scales (first three contacting the chin shields), and seven maxillary teeth. It also has two to three preventral scales and three gular scales.

Females have 173–177 ventral scales and 25–27 subcaudal scales; one uncollected male was reported with 31 subcaudals. The anal scale is single. The dorsal coloration is brown with faint dark longitudinal lines, while the venter is yellow with fine brown stippling. The holotype is an adult female measuring 376 mm in snout–vent length and 37 mm in tail length.

== Distribution and habitat ==
Atractus zgap is known from five localities in the Río Quijos valley, in Napo Province, northeastern Ecuador. These sites are located on the Amazonian slope of the Andes, at elevations between 1460 and 1703 metres above sea level. The species occurs in a narrow elevational band within humid montane forest and surrounding agricultural landscapes.

Individuals have primarily been found during the day, buried in soft soil, under rocks, or among vegetation in plantations, rural gardens, and areas adjacent to remnant forest. At night, some have been observed crossing roads. Specimens have also been encountered during warm, humid conditions following rain. These observations suggest a mainly fossorial lifestyle with occasional surface activity under favorable environmental conditions.

== Conservation ==
The species is proposed to be classified as endangered under IUCN Red List criteria B2a and B2b (i, iii), based on its restricted extent of occurrence (estimated at less than 500 km²), fragmented habitat, and continuing decline in forest cover and habitat quality. The Río Quijos valley, where the species occurs, has a long history of land use and deforestation, beginning before European colonization and intensifying in recent decades due to cattle farming and agriculture. Although A. zgap has been recorded in the Bosque Protector La Cascada, it has not yet been documented in larger protected areas nearby, such as Cayambe Coca National Park and Sumaco Napo-Galeras National Park.
