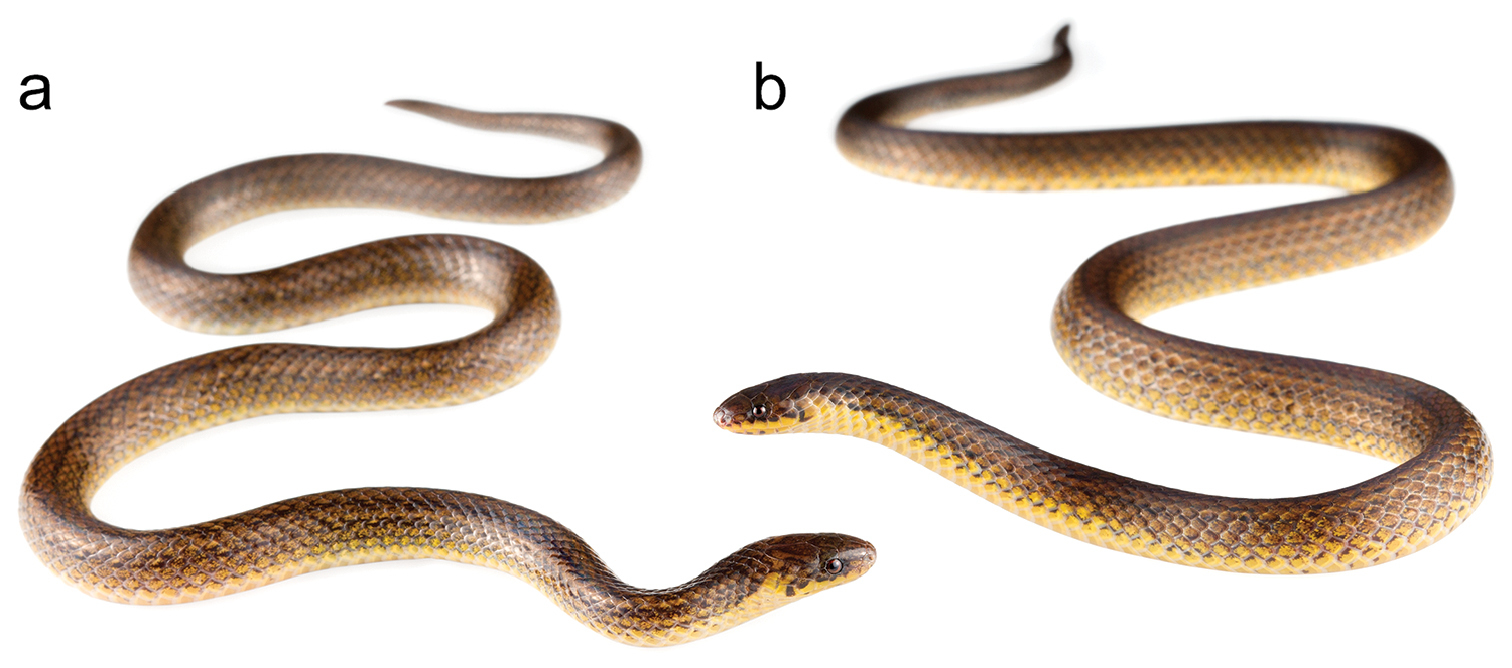

Scientific classification
- Kingdom: Animalia
- Phylum: Chordata
- Class: Reptilia
- Order: Squamata
- Suborder: Serpentes
- Family: Colubridae
- Genus: Atractus
- Species: A. cerberus

Binomial name
- Atractus cerberus Arteaga, Mebert, Valencia, Cisneros-Heredia, Peñafiel, Reyes-Puig, Vieira-Fernandes, & Guayasamin, 2017

= Atractus cerberus =

Species of snake

Atractus cerberus, the Cerberus ground snake, is a species of snake in the family Colubridae. The species can be found in Ecuador.
