= Atractus alytogrammus =

Scientific classification
- Kingdom: Animalia
- Phylum: Chordata
- Class: Reptilia
- Order: Squamata
- Suborder: Serpentes
- Family: Colubridae
- Genus: Atractus
- Species: A. alytogrammus

Binomial name
- Atractus alytogrammus G. Köhler & Kieckbusch, 2014

Species of snake

Atractus alytogrammus is a species of snake in the family Colubridae. The species can be found in Colombia.
