= Atractus apophis =

Conservation status
- Data Deficient (IUCN 3.1)

Scientific classification
- Kingdom: Animalia
- Phylum: Chordata
- Class: Reptilia
- Order: Squamata
- Suborder: Serpentes
- Family: Colubridae
- Genus: Atractus
- Species: A. apophis

Binomial name
- Atractus apophis Passos & Lynch, 2010

Species of snake

Atractus apophis is a species of snake in the family Colubridae. The species can be found in Colombia.
