= Atractus guentheri =

Conservation status
- Near Threatened (IUCN 3.1)

Scientific classification
- Kingdom: Animalia
- Phylum: Chordata
- Class: Reptilia
- Order: Squamata
- Suborder: Serpentes
- Family: Colubridae
- Genus: Atractus
- Species: A. guentheri

Binomial name
- Atractus guentheri (Wucherer, 1861)

Synonyms
- Geophis güntheri Wucherer, 1861; Atractus guentheri — Boulenger, 1894

Species of snake

Atractus guentheri, also known commonly as Günther's ground snake and coral-falsa in Brazilian Portuguese, is a species of snake in the subfamily Dipsadinae of the family Colubridae. The species is endemic to Brazil.

== Etymology ==
The specific name, guentheri, is in honor of German-born British herpetologist Albert Günther.

== Geographic range ==
A. guentheri is found in the eastern portion of the Brazilian state of Bahia, in the northern portion of the Atlantic Forest.

== Habitat ==
The preferred natural habitat of A. guentheri is forest, at altitudes from sea level to 300 m (980 ft).

== Description ==
Moderate-sized for its genus, A. guentheri may attain a snout-to-vent length (SVL) of 44 cm (17 in). Females are larger than males. Dorsally, it is brown or beige, with three dark brown stripes. The vertebral stripe is three scales wide, and the dorsolateral stripes are one scale wide. Ventrally, it is uniformly reddish or pink.

== Diet ==
A. guentheri preys upon worms.

== Reproduction ==
A. guentheri is oviparous.
