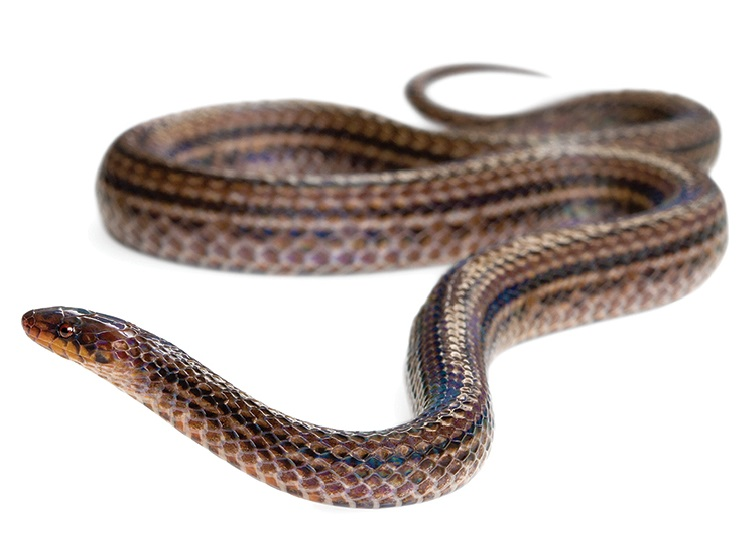

Conservation status
- Endangered (IUCN 3.1)

Scientific classification
- Kingdom: Animalia
- Phylum: Chordata
- Class: Reptilia
- Order: Squamata
- Suborder: Serpentes
- Family: Colubridae
- Genus: Atractus
- Species: A. occidentalis

Binomial name
- Atractus occidentalis (Savage, 1955)

= Atractus occidentalis =

Species of snake

Atractus occidentalis, the western ground snake, is a species of snake in the family Colubridae. The species can be found in Ecuador.
