= Atractus multidentatus =

Conservation status
- Critically Endangered (IUCN 3.1)

Scientific classification
- Kingdom: Animalia
- Phylum: Chordata
- Class: Reptilia
- Order: Squamata
- Suborder: Serpentes
- Family: Colubridae
- Genus: Atractus
- Species: A. multidentatus

Binomial name
- Atractus multidentatus Passos, Rivas, & Barrio-Amorós, 2009

Species of snake

Atractus multidentatus is a species of snake in the family Colubridae. The species can be found in Venezuela.
