= Atractus ronnie =

Conservation status
- Endangered (IUCN 3.1)

Scientific classification
- Kingdom: Animalia
- Phylum: Chordata
- Class: Reptilia
- Order: Squamata
- Suborder: Serpentes
- Family: Colubridae
- Genus: Atractus
- Species: A. ronnie

Binomial name
- Atractus ronnie Passos, Fernandes & Borges-Nojosa, 2007

Species of snake

Atractus ronnie is a species of snake in the family Colubridae. The species can be found in Brazil.
