= Atractus potschi =

Conservation status
- Least Concern (IUCN 3.1)

Scientific classification
- Kingdom: Animalia
- Phylum: Chordata
- Class: Reptilia
- Order: Squamata
- Suborder: Serpentes
- Family: Colubridae
- Genus: Atractus
- Species: A. potschi

Binomial name
- Atractus potschi Fernandes, 1995

Species of snake

Atractus potschi is a species of snake in the family Colubridae. The species can be found in Brazil.
