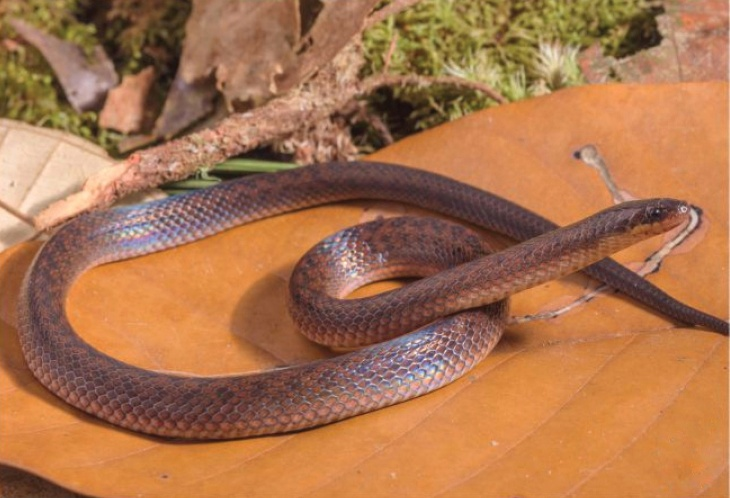
- Attractus Riveroi

Conservation status
- Least Concern (IUCN 3.1)

Scientific classification
- Kingdom: Animalia
- Phylum: Chordata
- Class: Reptilia
- Order: Squamata
- Suborder: Serpentes
- Family: Colubridae
- Genus: Atractus
- Species: A. riveroi

Binomial name
- Atractus riveroi Roze, 1961

= Atractus riveroi =

Species of snake

Atractus riveroi, Rivero's ground snake, is a species of snake in the family Colubridae. The species can be found in Venezuela.
