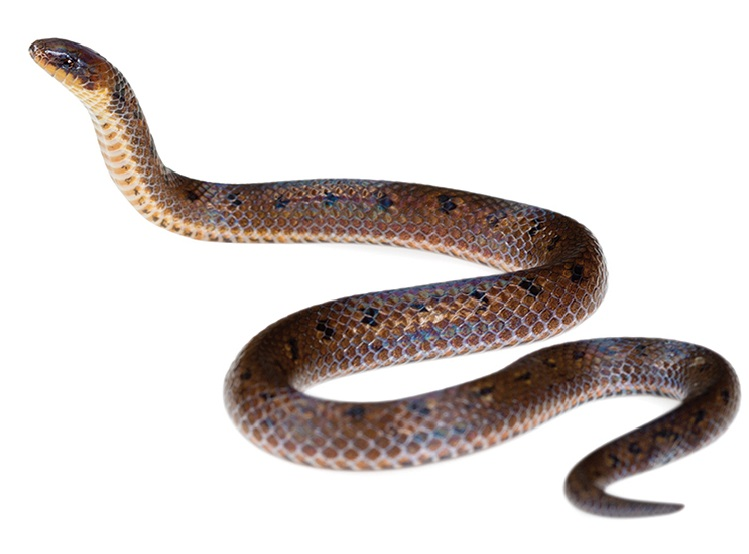

Conservation status
- Near Threatened (IUCN 3.1)

Scientific classification
- Kingdom: Animalia
- Phylum: Chordata
- Class: Reptilia
- Order: Squamata
- Suborder: Serpentes
- Family: Colubridae
- Genus: Atractus
- Species: A. dunni

Binomial name
- Atractus dunni Savage, 1955

= Atractus dunni =

Species of snake

Atractus dunni, Dunn's ground snake, is a species of snake in the family Colubridae. The species can be found in Ecuador.
