= Atractus roulei =

Conservation status
- Vulnerable (IUCN 3.1)

Scientific classification
- Kingdom: Animalia
- Phylum: Chordata
- Class: Reptilia
- Order: Squamata
- Suborder: Serpentes
- Family: Colubridae
- Genus: Atractus
- Species: A. roulei

Binomial name
- Atractus roulei Despax, 1910

Species of snake

Atractus roulei, Roule's ground snake, is a species of snake in the family Colubridae. The species can be found in Ecuador and Peru.
