= Atractus punctiventris =

Conservation status
- Data Deficient (IUCN 3.1)

Scientific classification
- Kingdom: Animalia
- Phylum: Chordata
- Class: Reptilia
- Order: Squamata
- Suborder: Serpentes
- Family: Colubridae
- Genus: Atractus
- Species: A. punctiventris

Binomial name
- Atractus punctiventris Amaral, 1933

Species of snake

Atractus punctiventris, the pointed ground snake, is a species of snake in the family Colubridae. The species can be found in Colombia.

== Description ==
It is a small, non-venomous snake characterized by pale brown dorsal coloration with irregular darker blotches and a cream-colored belly. Atractus punctiventris is oviparous and primarily terrestrial, inhabiting forested areas. Detailed information on its ecology and population status remains limited.
