= Atractus serranus =

Conservation status
- Vulnerable (IUCN 3.1)

Scientific classification
- Kingdom: Animalia
- Phylum: Chordata
- Class: Reptilia
- Order: Squamata
- Suborder: Serpentes
- Family: Colubridae
- Genus: Atractus
- Species: A. serranus

Binomial name
- Atractus serranus Amaral, 1930

Species of snake

Atractus serranus, the Sao Paulo ground snake, is a species of snake in the family Colubridae. The species can be found in Brazil.
