= Atractus caete =

Conservation status
- Endangered (IUCN 3.1)

Scientific classification
- Kingdom: Animalia
- Phylum: Chordata
- Class: Reptilia
- Order: Squamata
- Suborder: Serpentes
- Family: Colubridae
- Genus: Atractus
- Species: A. caete

Binomial name
- Atractus caete Passos, Fernandes, Bernils, & Moura-Leite, 2010

Species of snake

Atractus caete is a species of snake in the family Colubridae. The species can be found in Brazil.
