= Atractus spinalis =

Conservation status
- Data Deficient (IUCN 3.1)

Scientific classification
- Kingdom: Animalia
- Phylum: Chordata
- Class: Reptilia
- Order: Squamata
- Suborder: Serpentes
- Family: Colubridae
- Genus: Atractus
- Species: A. spinalis

Binomial name
- Atractus spinalis Passos, TeixeirA Jr., Recoder, Renato, de Sena, dal Vechio, Arruda-Pinto, Mendonça, Cassimiro, & Rodrigues, 2013

Species of snake

Atractus spinalis is a species of snake in the family Colubridae. The species can be found in Brazil.
