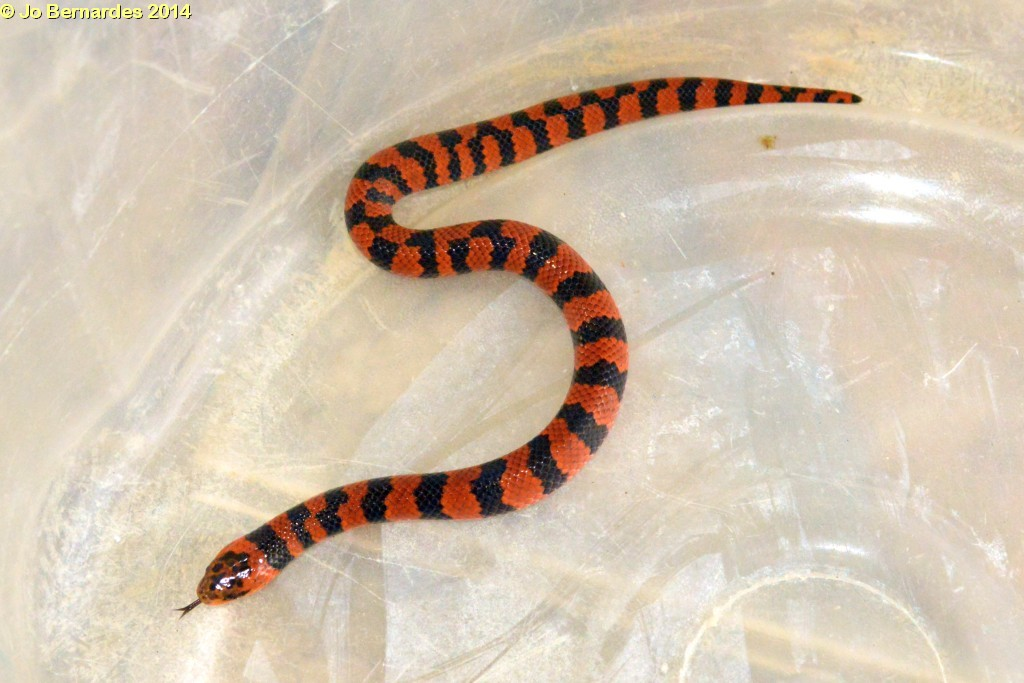

Conservation status
- Least Concern (IUCN 3.1)

Scientific classification
- Kingdom: Animalia
- Phylum: Chordata
- Class: Reptilia
- Order: Squamata
- Suborder: Serpentes
- Family: Colubridae
- Genus: Atractus
- Species: A. trihedrurus

Binomial name
- Atractus trihedrurus Amaral, 1926

= Atractus trihedrurus =

Species of snake

Atractus trihedrurus is a species of snake in the family Colubridae. In English the species goes by the common name southern ground snake. It eats oligochaete worms.

A. trihedrurus reproduces sexually through oviparity.

It can be found in southern Brazil and is endemic to the Atlantic Forest.

The IUCN lists the A. trihedrurus as least concern, while agricultural and mining have a impacted on the species. This species occurs in protected regions, the habitat decline is very low, and the species has a extent occurrence of around 36,000 km^{2.}
