= Atractus orcesi =

Conservation status
- Least Concern (IUCN 3.1)

Scientific classification
- Kingdom: Animalia
- Phylum: Chordata
- Class: Reptilia
- Order: Squamata
- Suborder: Serpentes
- Family: Colubridae
- Genus: Atractus
- Species: A. orcesi

Binomial name
- Atractus orcesi Savage, 1955

Species of snake

Atractus orcesi is a species of snake in the family Colubridae. The species can be found in Ecuador and Colombia.
