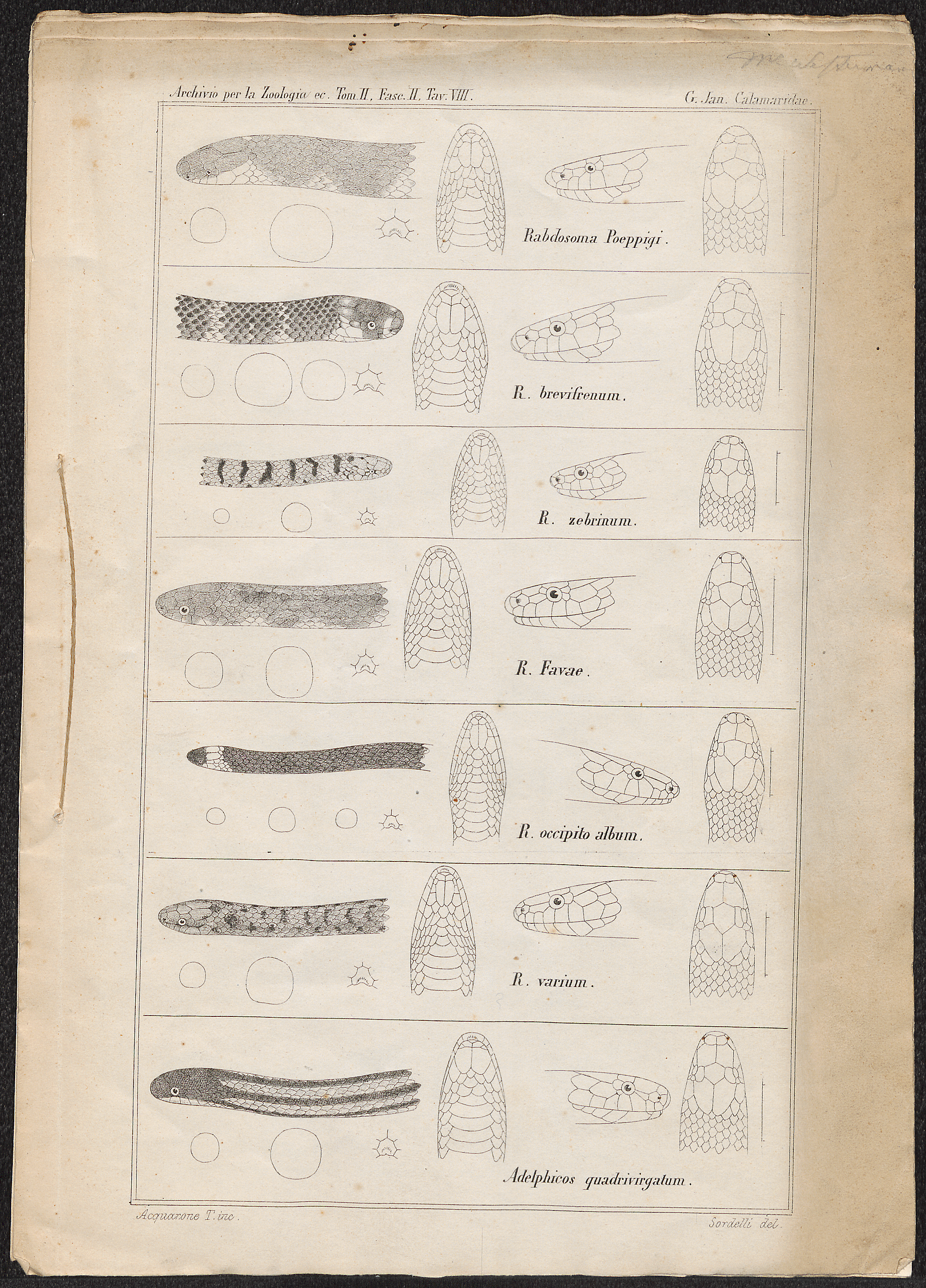
- Rabdosoma Poeppigi = Atractus poeppigi (Jan, 1862) R. brevifrenum = Atractus elaps (Günther, 1858) R. zebrinum = Atractus zebrinus (Jan, 1862) R. Favae = Atractus favae (Filippi, 1840) R. occipito album = Atractus occipitoalbus (Jan, 1862) R. varium = Atractus torquatus (Duméril, Bibron & Duméril, 1854) Adelphicos quadrivirgatum Jan, 1862

Conservation status
- Least Concern (IUCN 3.1)

Scientific classification
- Kingdom: Animalia
- Phylum: Chordata
- Class: Reptilia
- Order: Squamata
- Suborder: Serpentes
- Family: Colubridae
- Genus: Atractus
- Species: A. zebrinus

Binomial name
- Atractus zebrinus (Jan, 1862)

= Atractus zebrinus =

Species of snake

Atractus zebrinus is a species of snake in the family Colubridae. The species can be found in Brazil.

== Description ==
Atractus zebrinus is a smaller snake with adult females reaching up to 60 cm (24 in) and males up to 45.7 cm (18.0 in).

Its dorsum is cream-red with irregular transverse black blotches bordered with white, the venter and underside of the tail are creamish white. Juveniles tend to be paler, with narrower blotches and lacking the white borders.
