= Atractus stygius =

Scientific classification
- Kingdom: Animalia
- Phylum: Chordata
- Class: Reptilia
- Order: Squamata
- Suborder: Serpentes
- Family: Colubridae
- Genus: Atractus
- Species: A. stygius

Binomial name
- Atractus stygius Passos, Azevedo, Nogueira, Fernandes, & Sawaya, 2019

Species of snake

Atractus stygius is a species of snake in the family Colubridae. The species can be found in Brazil.
