= Atractus francoi =

Conservation status
- Least Concern (IUCN 3.1)

Scientific classification
- Kingdom: Animalia
- Phylum: Chordata
- Class: Reptilia
- Order: Squamata
- Suborder: Serpentes
- Family: Colubridae
- Genus: Atractus
- Species: A. francoi

Binomial name
- Atractus francoi Passos, Fernandes, Bérnils & Moura-Leite, 2010

Species of snake

Atractus francoi, also known commonly as cobra-da-terra in Brazilian Portuguese, is a species of snake in the family Colubridae. The species is endemic to Brazil.

== Etymology ==
The specific name, francoi, is in honor of Brazilian herpetologist Francisco Luís Franco.

== Geographic range ==
A. francoi is found in the Brazilian states of Rio de Janeiro and São Paulo.

== Habitat ==
The preferred natural habitat of A. francoi is forest.

== Description ==
A. francoi may attain a snout-to-vent length (SVL) of about 50 cm (20 in). It has seven upper labials and seven lower labials. The dorsal scales are arranged in 17 rows throughout the length of the body. The tail is short in females (about 7% SVL) and moderate in males (about 13% SVL).

== Behavior ==
A. francoi is both diurnal and nocturnal, and it is fossorial.

== Diet ==
A. francoi preys upon worms.

== Reproduction ==
A. francoi is oviparous. Clutch size is at least six eggs.
