= Atractus carrioni =

Conservation status
- Endangered (IUCN 3.1)

Scientific classification
- Kingdom: Animalia
- Phylum: Chordata
- Class: Reptilia
- Order: Squamata
- Suborder: Serpentes
- Family: Colubridae
- Genus: Atractus
- Species: A. carrioni

Binomial name
- Atractus carrioni Parker, 1930

Species of snake

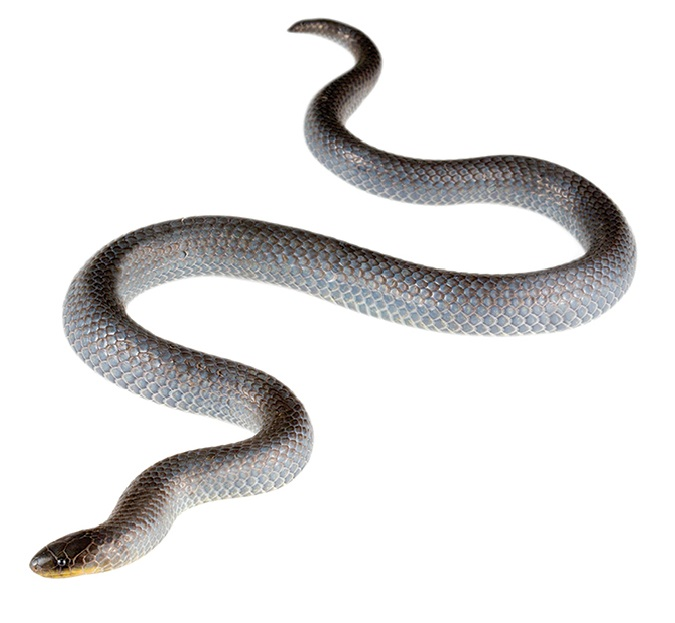

Atractus carrioni, Parker's ground snake or Carrion's ground snake, is a species of snake in the family Colubridae. The species can be found in Ecuador.
