= Atractus obesus =

Conservation status
- Data Deficient (IUCN 3.1)

Scientific classification
- Kingdom: Animalia
- Phylum: Chordata
- Class: Reptilia
- Order: Squamata
- Suborder: Serpentes
- Family: Colubridae
- Genus: Atractus
- Species: A. obesus

Binomial name
- Atractus obesus Marx, 1960

Species of snake

Atractus obesus, the fat ground snake, is a species of snake in the family Colubridae. The species can be found in Colombia.
