= Atractus titanicus =

Conservation status
- Least Concern (IUCN 3.1)

Scientific classification
- Kingdom: Animalia
- Phylum: Chordata
- Class: Reptilia
- Order: Squamata
- Suborder: Serpentes
- Family: Colubridae
- Genus: Atractus
- Species: A. titanicus

Binomial name
- Atractus titanicus Passos, Fernandes & Lynch, 2009

Species of snake

Atractus titanicus is a species of snake in the family Colubridae. The species can be found in Colombia.
