= Atractus reticulatus =

Conservation status
- Least Concern (IUCN 3.1)

Scientific classification
- Kingdom: Animalia
- Phylum: Chordata
- Class: Reptilia
- Order: Squamata
- Suborder: Serpentes
- Family: Colubridae
- Genus: Atractus
- Species: A. reticulatus

Binomial name
- Atractus reticulatus (Boulenger, 1885)

Synonyms
- Atractus reticulatus subsp. scrocchii Alvarez et al., 1992; Geophis reticulatus Boulenger, 1885

Species of snake

Atractus reticulatus, the reticulate ground snake, is a species of snake in the family Colubridae. The ecology and the biology of this species is poorly documented.

The species has been classified as least concern by the IUCN because it is widespread and has no known major threats. It eats worms.

== Description ==
A. reticulatus is a nocturnal species. It also exhibits variability in morphology and histochemistry for its infralabial glands which may reflect secretion constituent diversity and dietary specialization.

One study found that the species shows sexual dimorphism in the number of ventrals and subcaudals, as well as sexual dimorphism in tail length. The study also found that in this species the females are larger in length, while the males are larger in range and mean.

== Reproduction ==
There are few references regarding the species reproduction. But the species reproduces sexually by oviparous.

The species is also gonochoric.

== Occurrence ==
It occurs in semifossorial habitats. The species has been found in Paraguay, Southern Brazil, Argentina, and Uruguay.

== Common names ==
In English the species goes by the common name reticulate ground snake, while in Portuguese it is called cobra-cega, cobra-da-terra, cobra-de-terra-comum, cobra-reticulada, cobra-tijolo, cobrinha-da-terra, fura-terra, or fura-terra-reticulada.
