= Atractus trilineatus =

Conservation status
- Least Concern (IUCN 3.1)

Scientific classification
- Kingdom: Animalia
- Phylum: Chordata
- Class: Reptilia
- Order: Squamata
- Suborder: Serpentes
- Family: Colubridae
- Genus: Atractus
- Species: A. trilineatus

Binomial name
- Atractus trilineatus Wagler, 1828

Species of snake

Atractus trilineatus, commonly known as the three-lined ground snake, is a species of small burrowing snake in the family Colubridae. The species is native to South America.

== Geographic range ==
A. trilineatus is found in northern South America, including the Caribbean island of Trinidad.

== Habitat ==
The preferred natural habitat of A. trilineatus is forest and savanna, at altitudes from sea level to 500 m (1,600 ft), but it has also been found in agricultural and horticultural areas.

== Description ==
A. trilineatus may attain a total length of 225 mm (8 3/4 in), including a short tail of 15 mm (1/2 in). Dorsally, it is brown with three or four darker longitudinal stripes; ventrally it is either uniform white, or has a few brown dots. The smooth dorsal scales are in 15 rows, and the anal plate is entire. The ventrals number 125–150, and subcaudals only 11–19.

== Diet ==
A. trilineatus is believed to prey upon soft-bodied insects and earthworms, as well as fish and tadpoles.

== Reproduction ==
A. trilineatus is oviparous. Eggs are laid in March, May and August, and clutch size is three to five eggs.
