= Atractus nigricauda =

Scientific classification
- Kingdom: Animalia
- Phylum: Chordata
- Class: Reptilia
- Order: Squamata
- Suborder: Serpentes
- Family: Colubridae
- Genus: Atractus
- Species: A. nigricauda

Binomial name
- Atractus nigricauda Schmidt & Walker, 1943

Species of snake

Atractus nigricauda, the black-headed ground snake, is a species of snake in the family Colubridae. The species can be found in Peru.
