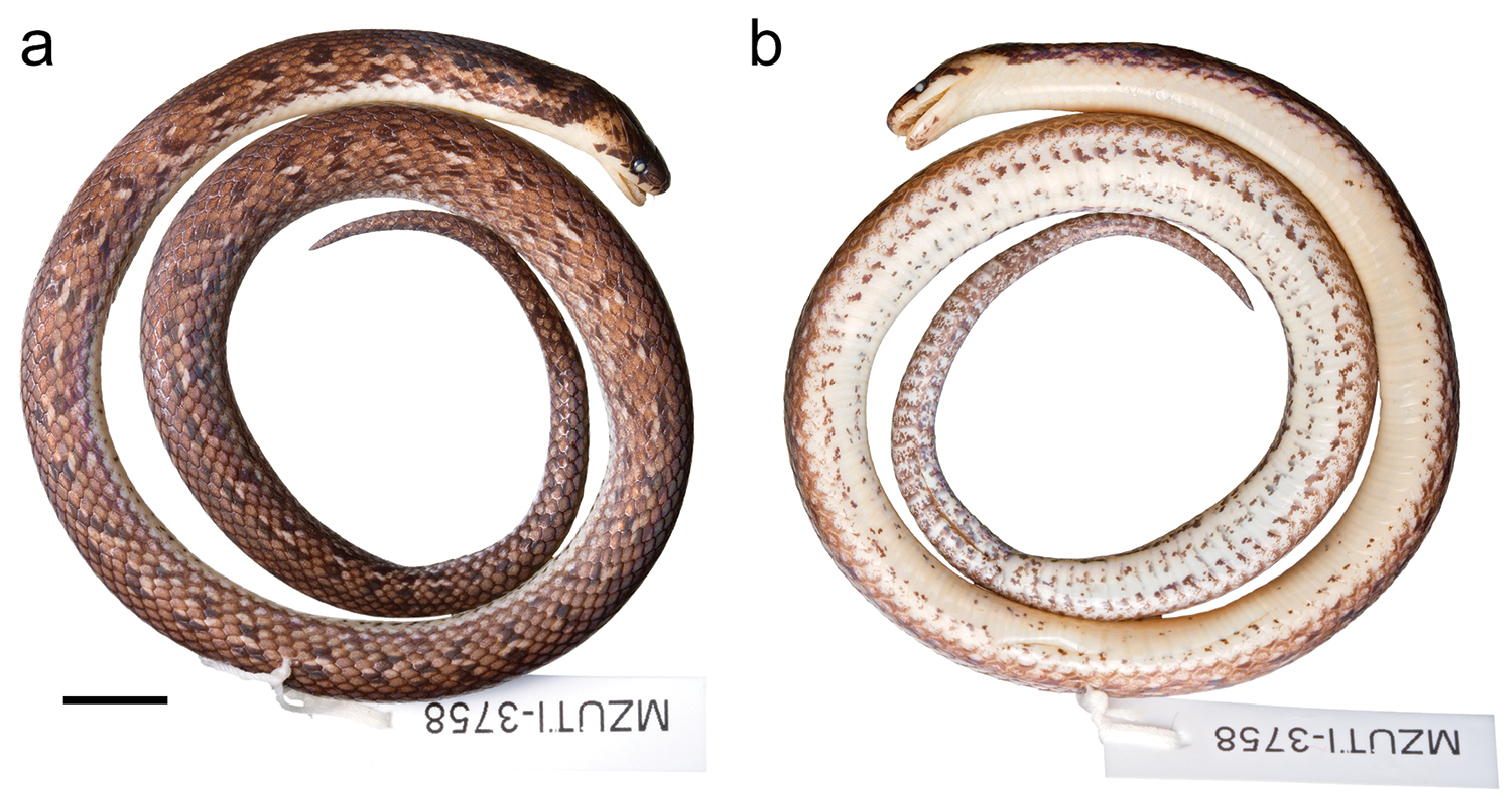

Scientific classification
- Kingdom: Animalia
- Phylum: Chordata
- Class: Reptilia
- Order: Squamata
- Suborder: Serpentes
- Family: Colubridae
- Genus: Atractus
- Species: A. esepe

Binomial name
- Atractus esepe Arteaga, Mebert, Valenci, Cisneros-Heredia, Peñafiel, Reyes-Puig, Vieira-Fernandes, Guayasamin, 2017

= Atractus esepe =

Species of snake

Atractus esepe, the indistinct ground snake, is a species of snake in the family Colubridae. The species can be found in Ecuador. It is oviparous.
