= Manuel Ángel González-Sponga =

Manuel Ángel González Sponga
- Born: April 30, 1929; Guatire, Miranda, Venezuela
- Died: March 1, 2009 (aged 79); Caracas, Venezuela
- Known for: Arachnids of Venezuela
- Scientific career
- Fields: Biology, Arachnology, Education
- Author abbrev. (zoology): González-Sponga

Manuel Ángel González Sponga (April 30, 1929 – March 1, 2009) was a Venezuelan zoologist devoted to the systematic and taxonomic study of the arachnids of Venezuela. He was also a biologist, arachnologist, and educator.

== Biography ==
Manuel Ángel González Sponga was born in Guatire, Miranda, Venezuela on April 30, 1929. A teacher by profession, he began his educational career around 1954 at the Liceo Dr. Ramón Alfonso Blanco, where he taught biology until 1964. That same year, he started teaching and research work at the then Instituto Pedagógico de Caracas (now Libertador Experimental Pedagogical University), where he remained as a professor until his retirement in 1991.

In 1970, he began a research project titled “Systematics of the Arachnids of Venezuela,” starting with his first publication: “I. Record of the genus Microtityus for Venezuela. II. Microtityus biordi (Scorpionida: Buthidae), a new species for the coastal mountain system of Venezuela.” Over the next 37 years of uninterrupted research, he published five books and more than 99 scientific papers on Venezuelan arachnological fauna as well as other regional fauna.

In 1992, he became a full member of the Academy of Physical, Mathematical and Natural Sciences of Venezuela, presenting the work titled “Arachnids of Venezuela. Opiliones Laniatores II, Family Cosmetidae.”

He later served as:

- Full Member, Academy of Physical, Mathematical and Natural Sciences of Venezuela.
- Professor Emeritus, Libertador Experimental Pedagogical University, Caracas, Venezuela.
- Visiting Collaborator, Cellular Neuropharmacology Laboratory, Venezuelan Institute for Scientific Research (IVIC).

== Honors and recognition ==
- Full Member, Academy of Physical, Mathematical and Natural Sciences of Venezuela.
- National Corresponding Member, Multidisciplinary Academy of Mérida, Mérida, Venezuela.
- Professor Emeritus, Libertador Experimental Pedagogical University, Caracas.
- In 1969, in his honor, a group of citizens from his hometown of Guatire founded the Centro Excursionista "Manuel Ángel González" (CEMAG).
- Named "Illustrious Son of Guatire," Miranda State, Venezuela.
- A species of the genus Broteochactas was named in his honor: Broteochactas gonzalezspongai Lourenço, 1983.
- A salamander species was named in his honor: Bolitoglossa spongai Barrios Amorós & Fuentes Ramos, 1999.
- A scorpion species of the genus Tityus was named in his honor: Tityus gonzalespongai Quiroga, De Sousa, Parrilla Alvares & Manzanilla, 2004.
- A schizomid species of the genus Wayuuzomus was named in his honor: Wayuuzomus gonzalezspongai Armas & Colmenares, 2006.
- In 2008, he was awarded the Santa Cruz de Pacairigua Order by the Municipality of Zamora, Guatire, for his scientific achievements.
- In 2009, Professor Sergio Foghin-Pillin published a biography of the distinguished researcher titled M. A. González-Sponga. Aracnólogo de Venezuela. (Caracas: Vice-rectorate of Research and Postgraduate Studies, UPEL).
