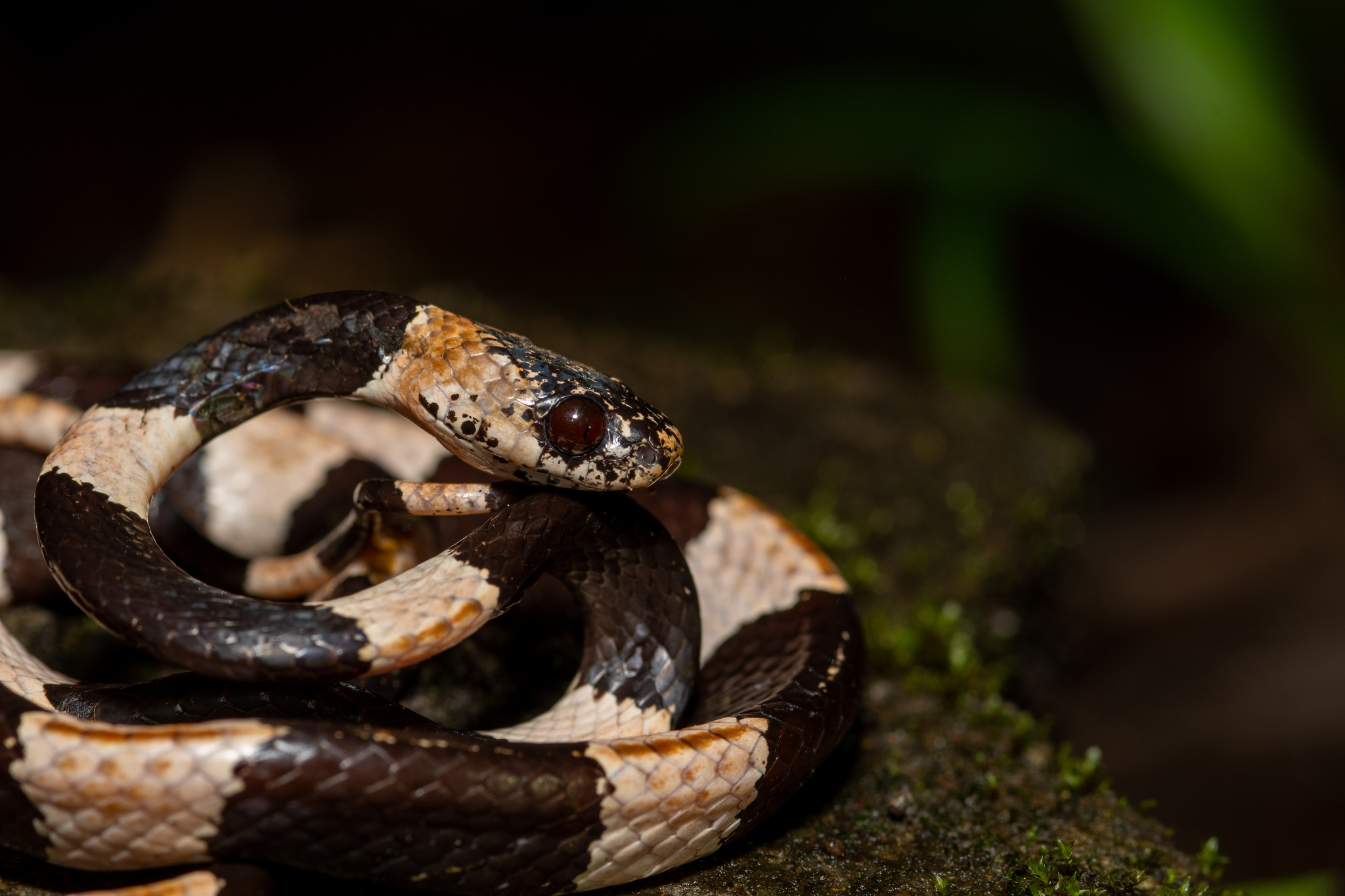

Conservation status
- Least Concern (IUCN 3.1)

Scientific classification
- Kingdom: Animalia
- Phylum: Chordata
- Class: Reptilia
- Order: Squamata
- Suborder: Serpentes
- Family: Colubridae
- Genus: Dipsas
- Species: D. articulata

Binomial name
- Dipsas articulata (Cope, 1868)

= Dipsas articulata =

American snail-eater

Species of snake

Dipsas articulata, commonly known as the American snail-eater, is a non-venomous species of snake found in Nicaragua, Costa Rica and Panama.

== Common names ==
D. articulata is known by a few names including the American snail-eater, but also the red-striped thirst snake and the Central American snail-eater.

== Distribution and habitat ==
The distribution of this species extends from the lowlands of southeastern Nicaragua to northwestern Panama. It has been identified mostly in parks, reserves, and other natural areas, like the Tirimbina Biological Reserve in Costa Rica and Portobelo National Park in Panama. The first record in Nicaragua was in 2002 during a herpetofaunal survey in Refugio Bartola when a male individual was found coiled up partially obscured by a vine on a tree trunk. A new record in Coclé, Panama in 2014 in a mid-elevation cloud forest extended its known geographic range slightly.

This arboreal species of snake has been found in lowland tropical wet forests. It is commonly found perched on trees or in vegetation low to the ground, likely searching for its main diet of terrestrial snails. There is a record of an individual found in a bromeliad attached to a fallen tree in Trinidad.

== Description ==
This species has a dorsal ground color of white with 14-17 reddish-brown to black bands that are approximately equal in length throughout the body. It is considered a coral snake mimic based on its pattern of light and dark rings. D. articulata resembles other Dipsas species with large eyes, but also has several small black spots on the head and lacks the classic mental groove characteristic of other species in this genus. This species is unique in that the sublabial scales usually are adjacent to the third pair of chin shields and the preventral scales or ventral scales.

Individuals of this species can range in body length from 460 to 483 mm (18.1 to 19.0 in), but a large male specimen was documented to have a 501 mm (19.7 in) snout-vent-length with 218 mm (8.6 in) tail length that weighed 16 g (0.035 lb). In 2011, this became the longest known record of this species, exceeding the previously published record of 712 mm (28.0 in) total length.

Many of the Dipsas snakes are very similar in appearance, and scientists have attempted to describe the main differences between them, especially between D. articulata, and D. viguieri, D. gracilis, D. brevifacies, and D. tenuisima. These species are strikingly similar to the eye and there is debate about their taxonomy and evolutionary relationship to each other. Because of this, there appears to be an "articulata group" of Dipsas in which multiple species fall, not to be confused with the distinct species D. articulata. These species within the articulata group include D. articulata, D. bicolor, D. brevifacies, D. gaigae, D. gracilis, D. maxillaris, D. tenuissima, and D. viguieri, and are considered a monophyletic group within the genus Dipsas.

== Diet and behavior ==
Dipsas articulata is considered a relatively rare, nocturnal snake. Like other Dipsas and as its name suggests, this snake primarily eats snails, especially land snails.

In terms of behavior, other members of the genus Dipsas are known for relatively docile defensive behaviors, but can range from a particular posturing to mimicry of some vipers through head triangulation and body orientation. Defensive behavior of an adult D. articulata after capture was recorded in 2004 and involved engaging in a balling defensive behavior, as it retracted into a ball, concealed its head, and remained in this state without moving for several minutes. The snake also flattened its neck and created neck coils when it was being handled.
