= Neotropical snail-eater =

The following species of snake are named neotropical snail-eater:

- Dipsas bucephala
- Dipsas cisticeps
- Dipsas indica
