= Jan's snail-eater =

There are two species of snake named Jan's snail-eater:

- Dipsas alternans
- Dipsas incerta
