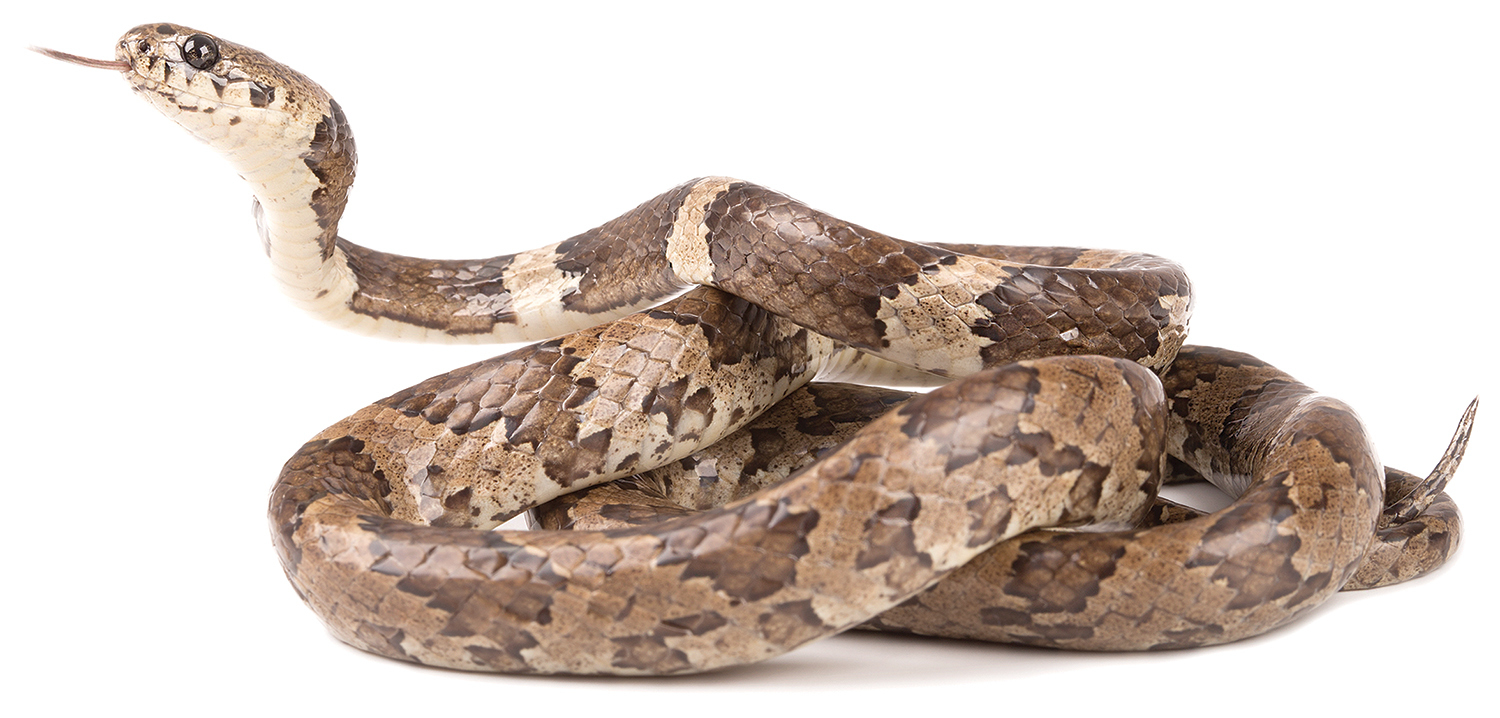

Scientific classification
- Kingdom: Animalia
- Phylum: Chordata
- Class: Reptilia
- Order: Squamata
- Suborder: Serpentes
- Family: Colubridae
- Genus: Dipsas
- Species: D. oswaldobaezi

Binomial name
- Dipsas oswaldobaezi Arteaga, Salazar-Valenzuela, Mebert, Peñafiel, Aguiar, Sánchez-Nivicela, Pyron, Colston, Cisneros-Heredia, Yánez-Muñoz, Venegas, Guayasamin, & Torres-Carvajal, 2018

= Dipsas oswaldobaezi =

Species of snake

Dipsas oswaldobaezi, Oswaldo Báez's snail-eater, is a non-venomous snake found in Ecuador and Peru.
