= Dipsas pakaraima =

Conservation status
- Least Concern (IUCN 3.1)

Scientific classification
- Kingdom: Animalia
- Phylum: Chordata
- Class: Reptilia
- Order: Squamata
- Suborder: Serpentes
- Family: Colubridae
- Genus: Dipsas
- Species: D. pakaraima

Binomial name
- Dipsas pakaraima MacCulloch & Lathrop, 2004

Species of snake

Dipsas pakaraima is an arboreal snake of the family Dipsadidae. It has been placed in the Dipsas temporalis group. It is native to medium and higher elevations in west-central Guyana. It has been collected in Kaieteur National Park and Mount Ayanganna. Its food probably consists of snails and slugs.
