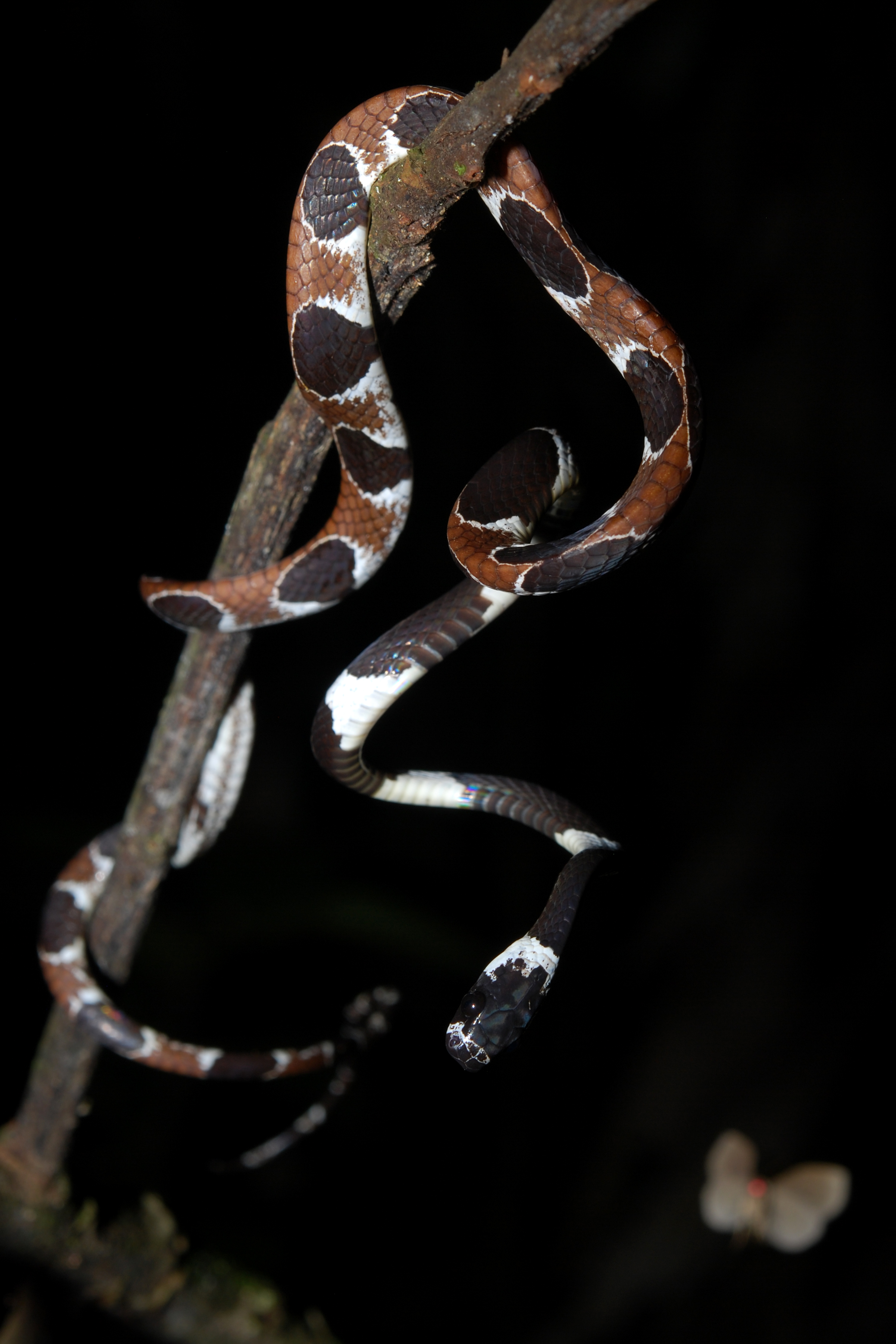
- Dipsas catesbyi in Ecuador

Scientific classification
- Kingdom: Animalia
- Phylum: Chordata
- Class: Reptilia
- Order: Squamata
- Suborder: Serpentes
- Family: Colubridae
- Subfamily: Dipsadinae
- Genus: Dipsas; Laurenti, 1768

= Dipsas =

Genus of snakes

Dipsas is a genus of nonvenomous New World snakes in the subfamily Dipsadinae of the family Colubridae. The genus Sibynomorphus has been moved here. Species of the genus Dipsas are known as snail-eaters.

== Taxonomy ==
The genus Dipsas includes over 50 distinct species. The following species are recognized as being valid.

- Dipsas albifrons (Sauvage, 1884) – Sauvage's snail-eater
- Dipsas alternans (Fischer, 1885) – Jan's snail-eater
- Dipsas andiana (Boulenger, 1896)
- Dipsas aparatiritos (Ray, Sánchez-Martínez, Batista, Mulcahy, Sheehy, E.N. Smith, Pyron & Arteaga, 2023)
- Dipsas articulata (Cope, 1868) – American snail-eater
- Dipsas baliomelas Harvey, 2008
- Dipsas bicolor (Günther, 1895) – two-colored snail-eater
- Dipsas bobridgelyi Arteaga et al., 2018 – Bob Ridgely's snail-eater
- Dipsas bothropoides Mebert, Passos, Fernandes, Entiauspe-Neto, Queiroz-Alvez, Machado & Lopes, 2020
- Dipsas brevifacies (Cope, 1866) – snail-eating thirst snake, short-faced snail-eater
- Dipsas bucephala (Shaw, 1802) – neotropical snail-eater
- Dipsas catesbyi (Sentzen, 1796) – Catesby's snail-eater
- Dipsas chaparensis Reynolds & Foster, 1992
- Dipsas cisticeps (Boettger, 1885) – neotropical snail-eater
- Dipsas copei (Günther, 1872)
- Dipsas elegans (Boulenger, 1896)
- Dipsas ellipsifera (Boulenger, 1898)
- Dipsas gaigeae (Oliver, 1937) – Gaige's thirst snail-eater, Gaige's thirst snake, zicatlinán
- Dipsas georgejetti Arteaga et al., 2018 – George Jett's snail-eater
- Dipsas gracilis (Boulenger, 1902) – graceful snail-eater
- Dipsas incerta (Jan, 1863) – Jan's snail-eater
- Dipsas indica Laurenti, 1768 – neotropical snail-eater
- Dipsas jamespetersi Orcés & Almendáriz, 1989
- Dipsas klebbai Arteaga et al., 2018 – Klebba's snail-eate
- Dipsas latifrontalis (Boulenger, 1905) – broad-fronted snail-eater, Venezuela snail-eater
- Dipsas lavillai Scrocchi, Porto & Rey, 1993
- Dipsas maxillaris (F. Werner, 1910) – Werner's thirst snake
- Dipsas mikanii (Schlegel, 1837)
- Dipsas neuwiedi (Ihering, 1911) – Neuwied's tree snake
- Dipsas nicholsi (Dunn, 1933)
- Dipsas oligozonata Orcés & Almendáriz, 1989
- Dipsas oneilli Rossman & Thomas, 1979 – O'Neill's tree snake
- Dipsas oreas (Cope, 1868) – Ecuador snail-eater
- Dipsas oswaldobaezi Arteaga et al., 2018 – Oswaldo Báez's snail-eater
- Dipsas pakaraima MacCulloch & Lathrop, 2004
- Dipsas palmeri (Boulenger, 1912) – Palmer's snail-eater
- Dipsas pavonina Schlegel, 1837 – northern snail-eater
- Dipsas peruana (Boettger, 1898) – Peruvian snail-eater, Peru snail-eater
- Dipsas praeornata (F. Werner, 1909)
- Dipsas pratti (Boulenger, 1897) – Pratt's snail-eater
- Dipsas sanctijoannis (Boulenger, 1911) – tropical snail-eater
- Dipsas sazimai Fernandes, Marques & Argôlo, 2010
- Dipsas schunkii (Boulenger, 1908) – Schunk's snail-eater
- Dipsas temporalis (F. Werner, 1909) – temporal snail-eater
- Dipsas tenuissima Taylor, 1954 – Taylor's snail-eater
- Dipsas trinitatis Parker, 1926 – Trinidad snail-eater
- Dipsas turgida (Cope, 1868) – Bolivian tree snake
- Dipsas vagrans (Dunn, 1923) – Dunn's tree snake
- Dipsas vagus (Jan, 1863) – Jan's tree snake
- Dipsas variegata (A.M.C. Duméril, Bibron & A.H.A. Duméril, 1854) – variegated snail-eater
- Dipsas ventrimaculata (Boulenger, 1885) – Boulenger's tree snake
- Dipsas vermiculata J.A. Peters, 1960 – vermiculate snail-eater
- Dipsas viguieri (Bocourt, 1884) – Bocourt's snail-eater
- Dipsas welborni Arteaga & Batista, 2023
- Dipsas williamsi Carillo de Espinoza, 1974 – Williams's tree snake

Nota bene: A binomial authority in parentheses indicates that the species was originally described in a genus other than Dipsas.

== Description ==
Dipsas species are slender, small to medium-sized snakes, often no longer than 60 cm (24 in), and rarely longer than 100 cm (39 in). Coloration and color pattern may vary, but often consist of black and brown, frequently with alternating rings separated by white.

== Distribution and habitat ==
Species in the genus Dipsas are found from southern Mexico through Central America and South America, as far as Argentina and Paraguay.

== Behavior and diet ==
Species in the genus Dipsas are mostly arboreal snakes that mainly feed on land snails and slugs.
