= Dipsas welborni =

Scientific classification
- Kingdom: Animalia
- Phylum: Chordata
- Class: Reptilia
- Order: Squamata
- Suborder: Serpentes
- Family: Colubridae
- Genus: Dipsas
- Species: D. welborni

Binomial name
- Dipsas welborni Arteaga & Batista, 2023

Species of snake

Dipsas welborni is a non-venomous species of snake in the subfamily Dipsadinae. It is found in 26 localities along the Cordillera del Cóndor in south-eastern Ecuador (provinces Morona Santiago and Zamora Chinchipe) and northern Peru (Amazonas department). The species occurs over an estimated area of 10,521 km2 and has been recorded at elevations 853–1843 m above sea level.

== Taxonomy ==
Dipsas welborni was formally described in 2023 based on an adult male specimen collected from the Maycu Reserve in the Zamora-Chinchipe Province, Ecuador. The species is named after David Welborn, a conservationist who served as the chairman of Nature and Culture International, a non-profit organization that has conserved more than 9 million hectares in Latin America, including key habitat in the Maycu Reserve. The species has the English common name Welborn's snail-eating snake and the Spanish common name Culebra caracolera de Welborn.

== Description ==
Males have a snout–vent length of 491–542 mm and tail length of 190–279 mm. Females have a snout–vent length of 321–595 mm and tail length of 132–281 mm. The dorsum has 21–26 dark brown to blackish body blotches separated from each other by narrow pale brown interspaces that become white towards the lower lateral side. The ventral surfaces are white, with encroachment from the dorsal dark brown blotches and with smaller brownish marks in-between the blotches. The dorsal aspect of the head is dark reddish-brown with light brown reticulations in adults and fine bright yellow reticulations in juveniles. The throat is white and the iris is pale brown.

== Distribution and habitat ==
Dipsas welborni is known from 26 localities along the Cordillera del Cóndor in southeastern Ecuador, in the provinces of Morona-Santiago and Zamora-Chinchipe, and northern Peru, in the Department of Amazonas. The species occurs over an estimated area of 10,521 km^{2} and has been recorded at elevations 853–1843 m above sea level. Specimens have been found foraging on vegetation 20–350 cm above the ground in evergreen montane forests, both old-growth and moderately disturbed. These snakes are non-aggressive, resorting to defensive measures when threatened, including body flattening, head expansion to form a triangular shape, and emitting a musky, unpalatable odor.

== Conservation ==
Dipsas welborni has not been assessed by the IUCN, but the authors of the study describing the species recommended that the species be considered near-threatened due to its extensive range over a portion of the Amazonian slopes of the Andes that are still fairly unspoiled. Around 76% of the species' habitat in Ecuador is still forested. However, much of the Cordillera del Cóndor, especially in Ecuador, is being deforested for large-scale opencast mining operations.
