= Dipsas aparatiritos =

Scientific classification
- Kingdom: Animalia
- Phylum: Chordata
- Class: Reptilia
- Order: Squamata
- Suborder: Serpentes
- Family: Colubridae
- Genus: Dipsas
- Species: D. aparatiritos

Binomial name
- Dipsas aparatiritos Ray, Sánchez-Martínez, Batista, Mulcahy, Sheehy, Smith, Pyron, Arteaga, 2023

Species of snake

Dipsas aparatiritos, also known as the hidden snail-eating snake, is a non-venomous snake found in Panama. Formally described in 2023, its name is derived from a Greek word meaning 'unnoticed', referring to the species occurring at a well-studied herpetological study site for over 40 years before being discovered.

It is found on both the Atlantic and Pacific slopes of the Cordillera Central in western Panama, with an additional population in Chagres National Park. It inhabits inhabit mid-elevation, premontane cloud-forest and has been recorded at elevations of 597–1002 m. It feeds on snails and oligochaetes. The authors of the study describing the species recommended that the species be considered near-threatened due to its rather limited range that suffers from high levels of deforestation.

== Taxonomy ==
Dipsas aparatiritos was formally described in 2023 based on an adult female specimen collected near El Copé de La Pintada in Coclé Province, Panama. The specific epithet is derived from the Greek word aparatíritos (απαρατήρητος), meaning 'unnoticed'. It refers to the snake's presence at a well-studied herpetological study site for over 40 years without being identified as a distinct species. The species has the English common name hidden snail-eating snake and the Spanish common name Caracolera Escondida.

== Description ==
Dipsas aparatiritos can be distinguished from similar species by a number of characteristics. It has 15 dorsal scale rows, one upper preocular scale, two or three postocular scales, 1+2 temporal scales, and seven or eight supralabial scales with the fourth and fifth contacting the orbit. There are eight or nine infralabial scales, with no infralabials in contact behind the mental scale, and a moderately enlarged vertebral row. Males have 191–196 ventral scales and 129–136 subcaudals. Females have 177–197 ventral scales and 111–131 subcaudals. Alternating dark brown and tan brown bands run the length of the body, including the tail.

== Distribution and habitat ==
Dipsas aparatiritos is found on both the Atlantic and Pacific slopes of the Cordillera Central in western Panama, with an additional population in Chagres National Park. The species occurs over an estimated area of 9,630 km^{2} and has been recorded at elevations of 597–1002 m, which makes it the most widespread species of Dipsas in Panama. Individuals collected from General de División Omar Torrijos Herrera National Park inhabit mid-elevation, premontane cloud-forest with mature secondary forest, permeated by many streams branching from Guabal River. As Donoso in Colón Province, and Quebrada Las Tres Honeras in Panamá Province are in valleys 134–197 m above sea level, a much lower elevation than all other localities, it is likely that the specimens collected there were actually found in the neighboring mountain ridges.

The species is known to feed on snails and oligochaetes. Specimens have been found in vegetation, at times over one meter in height, but at other times just centimeters off the ground camouflaged with the leaf litter. Gravid females have been found in all months except February, March, October, and December, with the highest frequency in June and July. Females had either one or two ova.

== Conservation ==
Dipsas aparatiritos has not been assessed by the IUCN, but the authors of the study describing the species recommended that the species be considered near-threatened due to its rather limited range that suffers from high levels of deforestation. Although the species inhabits the Santa Fe, General de División Omar Torrijos Herrera, Altos de Campana, and Chagres National Parks, 44% of its range has been deforested. The snake is probably highly dependent on old-growth forests.
