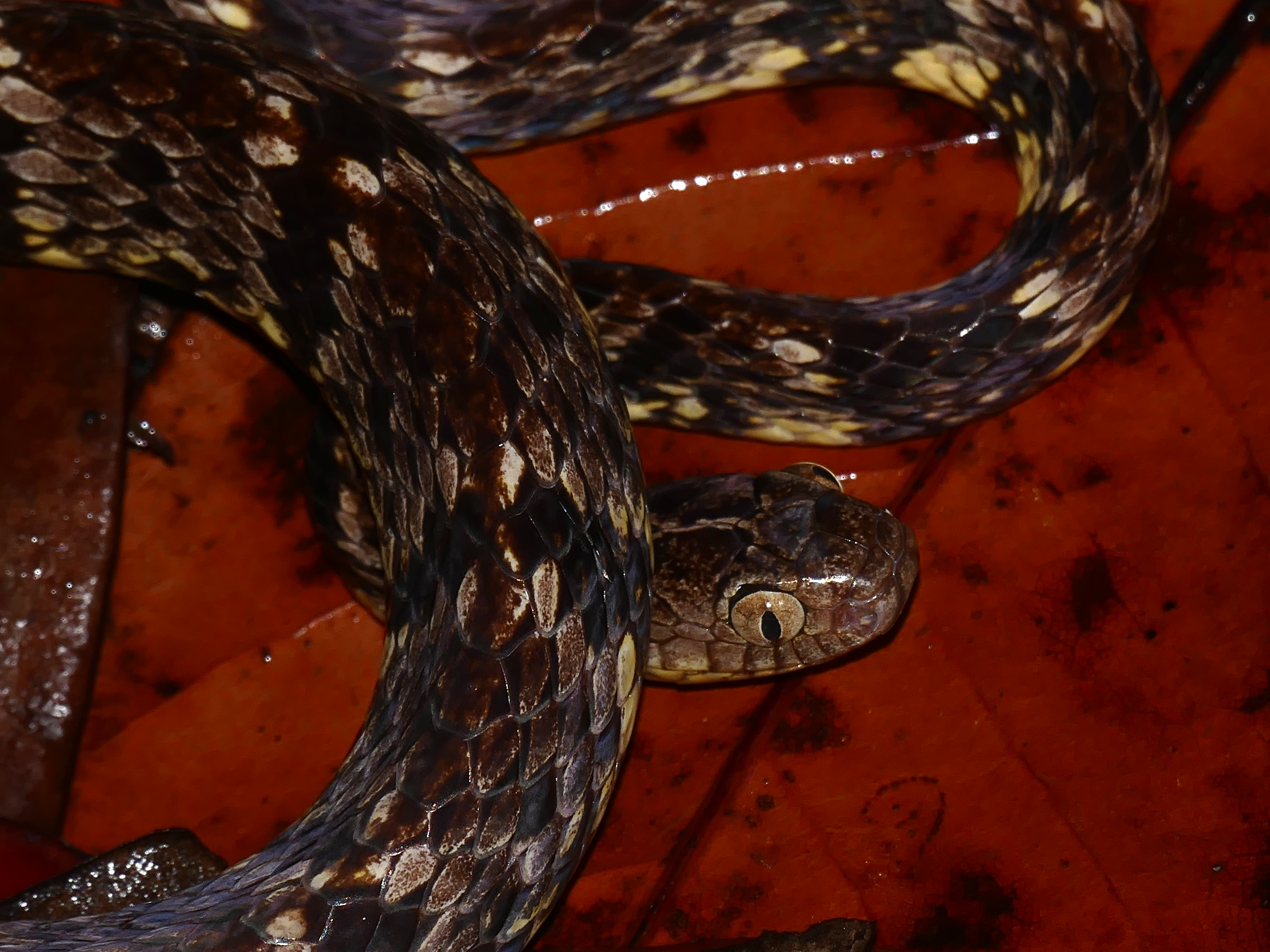

Conservation status
- Least Concern (IUCN 3.1)

Scientific classification
- Domain: Eukaryota
- Kingdom: Animalia
- Phylum: Chordata
- Class: Reptilia
- Order: Squamata
- Suborder: Serpentes
- Family: Colubridae
- Genus: Dipsas
- Species: D. variegata

Binomial name
- Dipsas variegata (Duméril, Bibron, & Duméril, 1854)

Synonyms
- Leptognathus variegatus Duméril, Bibron & Duméril, 1854

= Dipsas variegata =

Species of snake

Dipsas variegata, the variegated snail-eater, is a snake found in South America. It is reported to feed almost exclusively on tree snails and slugs.

Dipsas trinitatis, the Trinidad snail-eater from Trinidad and Tobago, has sometimes been considered a subspecies of Dipsas variegata (Dipsas variegata trinitatis).

== Reproduction ==
- Oviparous
