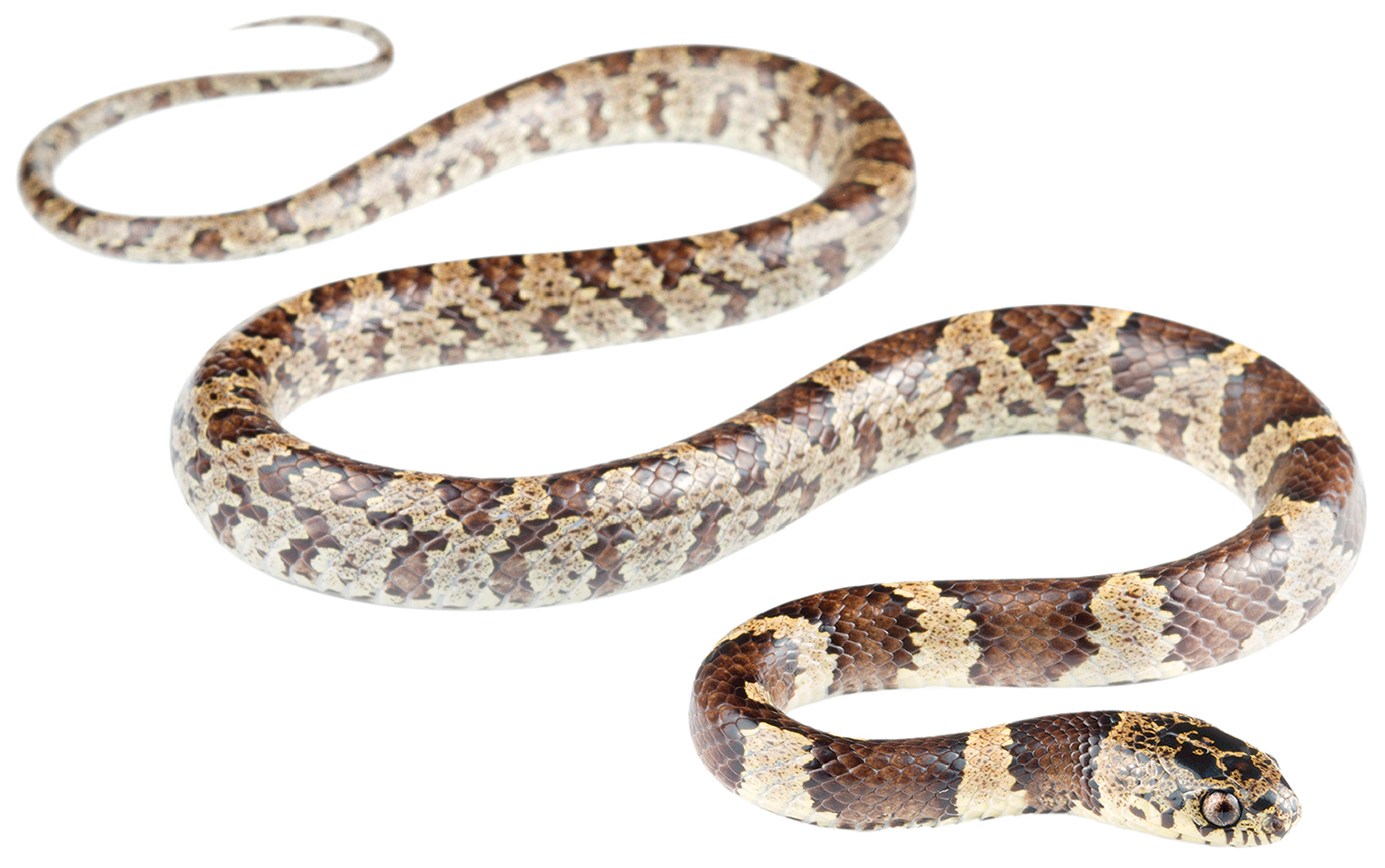

Scientific classification
- Kingdom: Animalia
- Phylum: Chordata
- Class: Reptilia
- Order: Squamata
- Suborder: Serpentes
- Family: Colubridae
- Genus: Dipsas
- Species: D. georgejetti

Binomial name
- Dipsas georgejetti Arteaga, Salazar-Valenzuela, Mebert, Peñafiel, Aguiar, Sánchez-Nivicela, Pyron, Colston, Cisneros-Heredia, Yánez-Muñoz, Venegas, Guayasamin, & Torres-Carvajal, 2018

= Dipsas georgejetti =

Species of snake

Dipsas georgejetti, George Jett's snail-eater, is a non-venomous snake found in Ecuador.
