= Dipsas vagus =

Conservation status
- Data Deficient (IUCN 3.1)

Scientific classification
- Kingdom: Animalia
- Phylum: Chordata
- Class: Reptilia
- Order: Squamata
- Suborder: Serpentes
- Family: Colubridae
- Genus: Dipsas
- Species: D. vagus

Binomial name
- Dipsas vagus (Jan, 1863)

Species of snake

Dipsas vagus, Jan's tree snake, is a non-venomous snake found in Peru.
