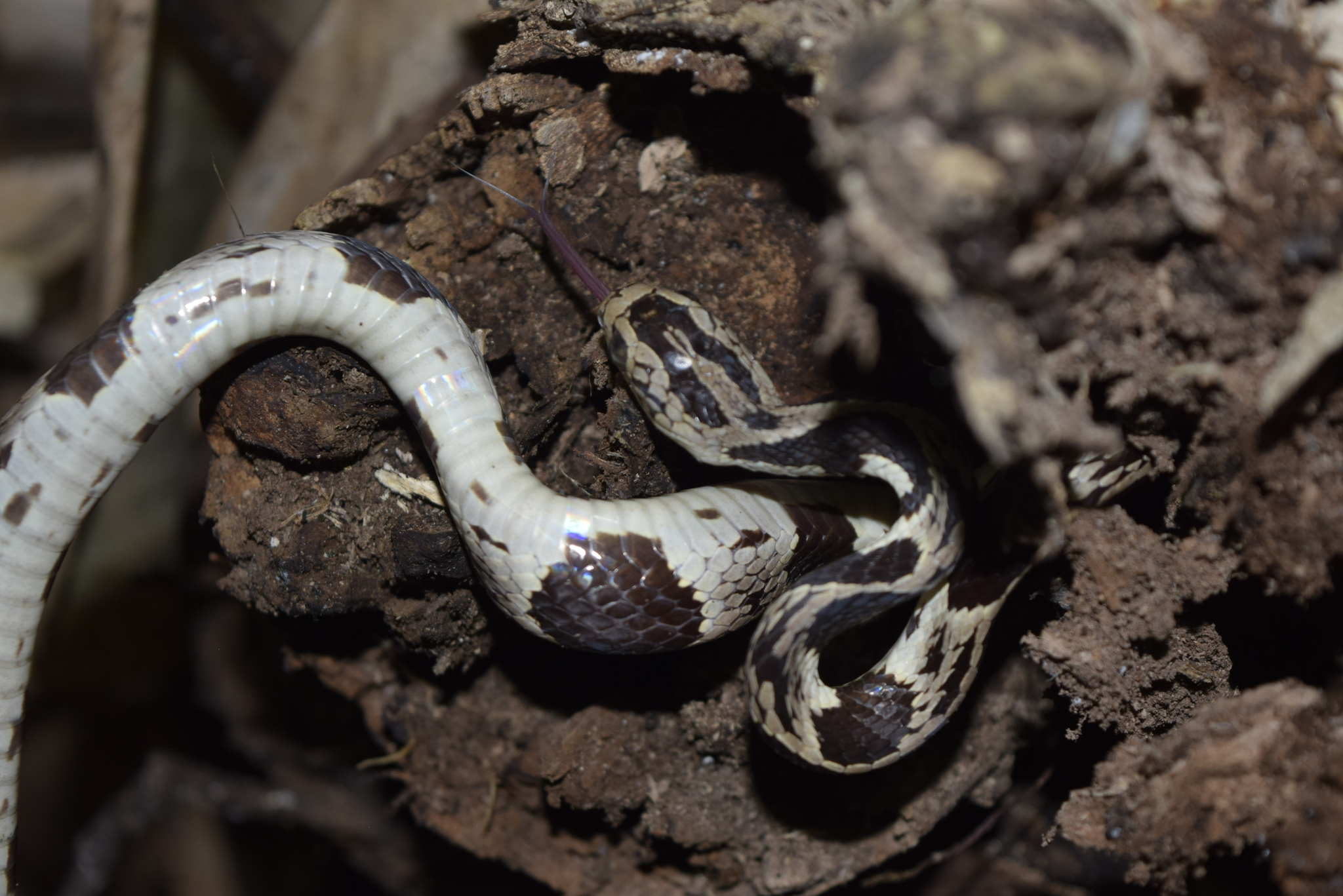

Conservation status
- Near Threatened (IUCN 3.1)

Scientific classification
- Kingdom: Animalia
- Phylum: Chordata
- Class: Reptilia
- Order: Squamata
- Suborder: Serpentes
- Family: Colubridae
- Genus: Dipsas
- Species: D. andiana

Binomial name
- Dipsas andiana (Boulenger, 1896)

= Dipsas andiana =

Species of snake

Dipsas andiana is a non-venomous snake found in Ecuador.

== Diet ==
Dipsas andiana eats snails.
