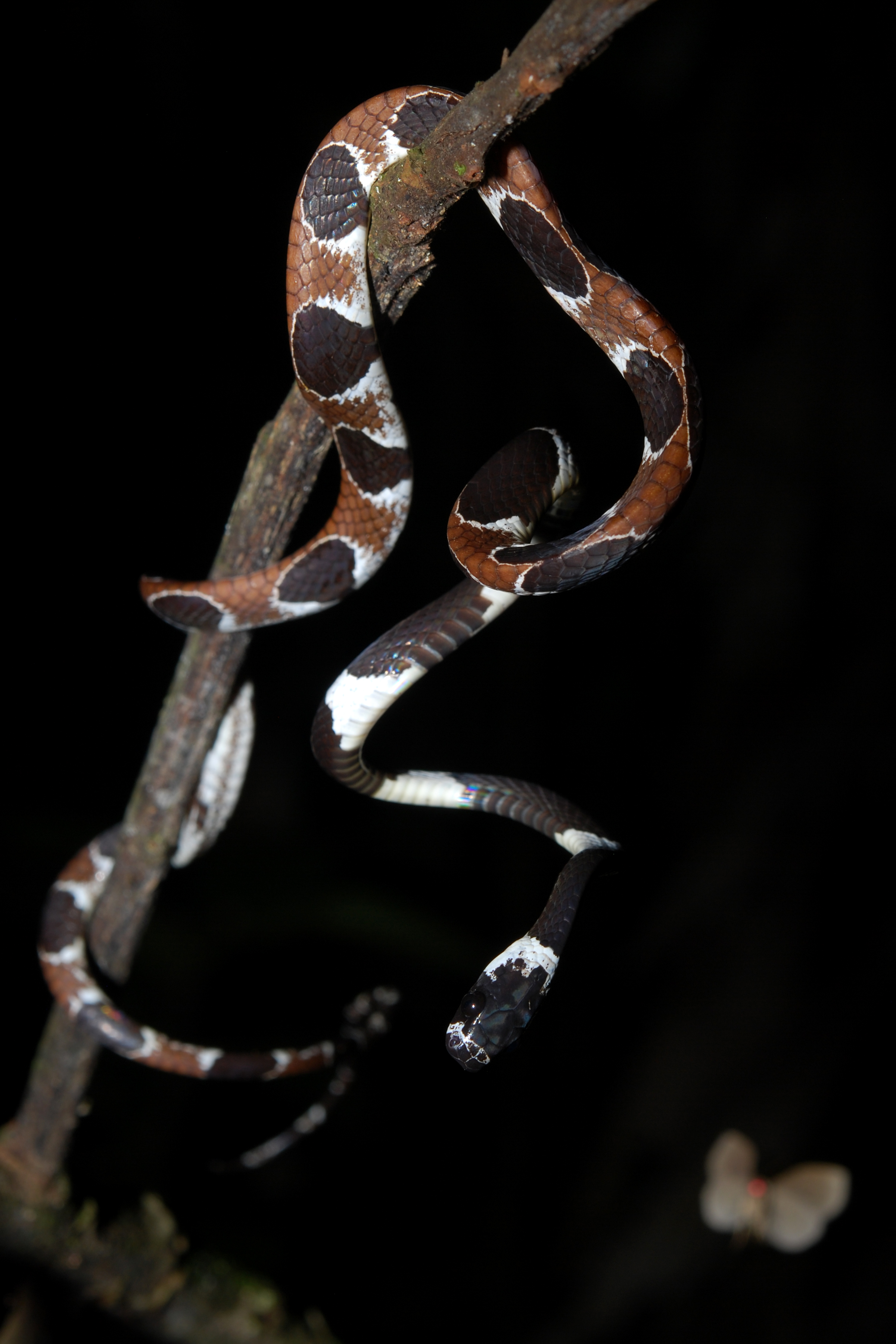

Conservation status
- Least Concern (IUCN 3.1)

Scientific classification
- Kingdom: Animalia
- Phylum: Chordata
- Class: Reptilia
- Order: Squamata
- Suborder: Serpentes
- Family: Colubridae
- Genus: Dipsas
- Species: D. catesbyi

Binomial name
- Dipsas catesbyi (Sentzen, 1796)

Synonyms
- Coluber catesbeji [sic] Sentzen, 1796; Dipsas catesbyi — F. Boie, 1827; Stremmatognathus catesbyi — A.M.C. Duméril, Bibron & A.H.A. Duméril, 1854; Leptognathus catesbyi — Günther, 1858; Leptognathus catisbyi [sic] W. Peters, 1871; Cochliophagus catesbyi — Berg, 1901; Sibynomorphus catesbeji — Barbour & Noble, 1920; Sibynomorphus catesbyi — Amaral, 1926; Sibynomorphus catesbyei [sic] Amaral, 1929; Dipsas catesbyi — J. Peters, 1956

= Catesby's snail-eater =

Species of snake

Catesby's snail-eater (Dipsas catesbyi), also commonly known as Catesby's snail sucker, is a nocturnal species of non-venomous snake in the family Colubridae. The species is native to northern South America.

In June 2021 upon manipulation, a snake of this species presented vocalization, a duration of 0.06 seconds, reaching 3036 Hz in its peak frequency with a modulated note, emitted through exhalation of air through the larynx, being the first record of a snake call in South America.

== Etymology ==
The specific name, catesbyi, is in honor of English naturalist Mark Catesby.

== Distribution ==
D. catesbyi is found in Bolivia, Brazil, Guyana, Colombia, Ecuador, French Guiana, Peru, Suriname, and Venezuela.

== Description ==
D.catesbyi has a thin body, with the maximum recorded length sitting at 598 mm (23.5 in) for males and 585 mm (23.0 in) for females. The number of ventral scales have been recorded to vary from 164 to 220 for males and from 167 to 200 for females, while the number of subcaudal scales have been recorded to vary from 70 to 120 for males and 60 to 102 for females. A D.catesbyi has between 10 to 40 dark brown to black blotches, usually with white outlines, along the length of a brown to reddish-brown. The blotches are longer than the spacing separating one blotch from the next, and some blotches are connected at the snake's midline. The snake's belly is white, and usually has rectangular spots similar in colouration to the blotches on their backs. The positions of the rectangular spots and the spaces between the blotches tend to correspond.

== Habitat ==
D. catesbyi lives at altitudes of up to 1,500 m (4,900 ft), in mountainous regions, tropical forests, and lowlands.

== Diet ==
D. catesbyi, like all species in the genus Dipsas, preys on arboreal land snails and slugs.

== Reproduction ==
D. catesbyi is oviparous.
