= Dipsas latifrontalis =

Scientific classification
- Domain: Eukaryota
- Kingdom: Animalia
- Phylum: Chordata
- Class: Reptilia
- Order: Squamata
- Suborder: Serpentes
- Family: Colubridae
- Genus: Dipsas
- Species: D. latifrontalis

Binomial name
- Dipsas latifrontalis (Boulenger, 1905)

Species of snake

Dipsas latifrontalis, the broad-fronted snail-eater or Venezuela snail-eater, is a non-venomous snake found in Venezuela and Colombia.
