= Dipsas oneilli =

Conservation status
- Least Concern (IUCN 3.1)

Scientific classification
- Kingdom: Animalia
- Phylum: Chordata
- Class: Reptilia
- Order: Squamata
- Suborder: Serpentes
- Family: Colubridae
- Genus: Dipsas
- Species: D. oneilli

Binomial name
- Dipsas oneilli (Rossman & Thomas, 1979)

Synonyms
- Sibynomorphus oneilli Rossman & Thomas, 1979

Species of snake

Dipsas oneilli, also known commonly as O'Neill's tree snake, is a species of snake in the subfamily Dipsadinae of the family Colubridae. The species is endemic to Peru.

== Etymology ==
The specific name, oneilli, is in honor of American ornithologist John P. O'Neill.

== Geographic distribution ==
Dipsas oneilli is found in the Andes of northwestern Peru, on both the Pacific slope and the Amazonian slope, at elevations of 1,646–3,500 m (5,400–11,483 ft).

== Behavior ==
Dipsas oneilli is arboreal.

== Diet ==
Dipsas oneilli preys predominately upon mollusks.

== Reproduction ==
Dipsas oneilli is oviparous.
