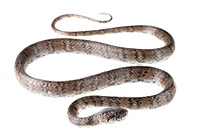

Conservation status
- Vulnerable (IUCN 3.1)

Scientific classification
- Kingdom: Animalia
- Phylum: Chordata
- Class: Reptilia
- Order: Squamata
- Suborder: Serpentes
- Family: Colubridae
- Genus: Dipsas
- Species: D. elegans

Binomial name
- Dipsas elegans (Boulenger, 1896)

= Dipsas elegans =

Species of snake

Dipsas elegans is a non-venomous snake found in Ecuador.
