= Dipsas oreas =

Conservation status
- Near Threatened (IUCN 3.1)

Scientific classification
- Kingdom: Animalia
- Phylum: Chordata
- Class: Reptilia
- Order: Squamata
- Suborder: Serpentes
- Family: Colubridae
- Genus: Dipsas
- Species: D. oreas

Binomial name
- Dipsas oreas (Cope, 1868)

Species of snake

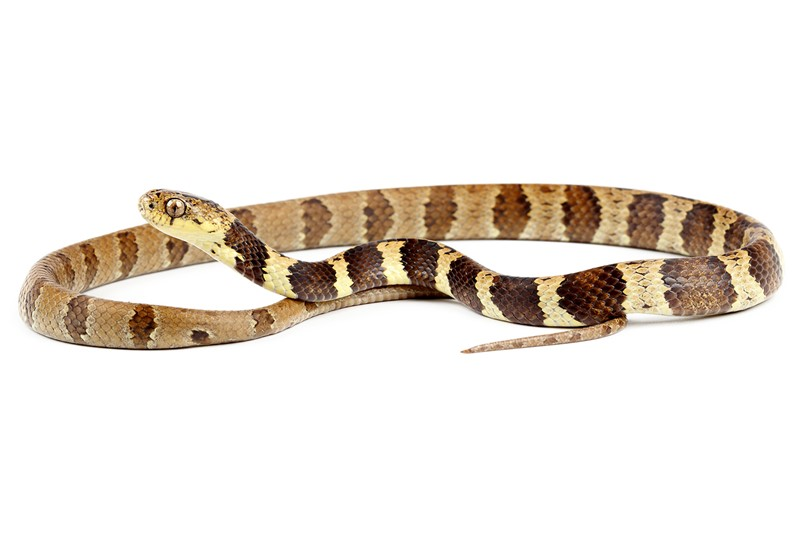
Dipsas oreas

The Ecuador snail-eater (Dipsas oreas) is a non-venomous snake found in Ecuador.
