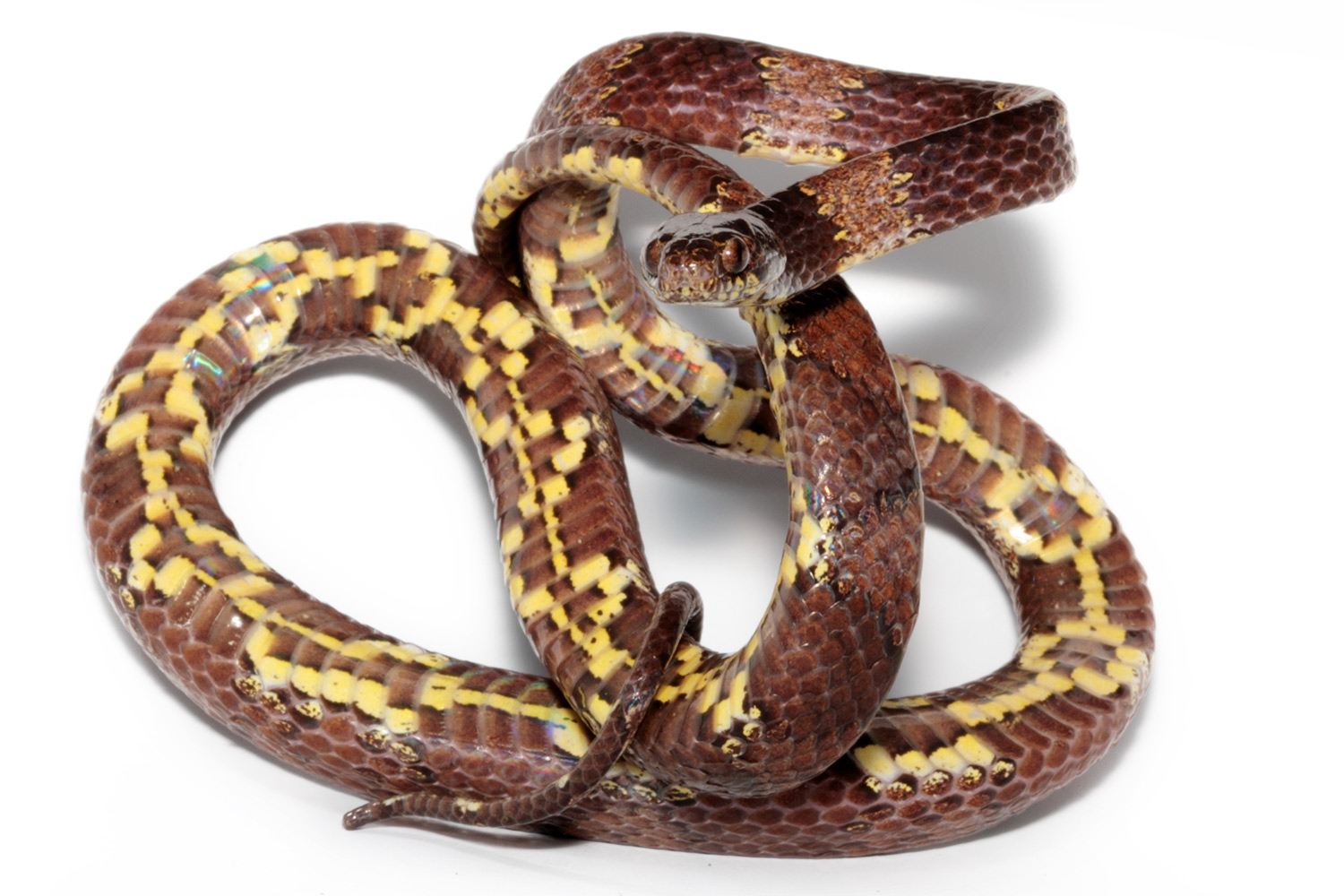

Conservation status
- Least Concern (IUCN 3.1)

Scientific classification
- Kingdom: Animalia
- Phylum: Chordata
- Class: Reptilia
- Order: Squamata
- Suborder: Serpentes
- Family: Colubridae
- Genus: Dipsas
- Species: D. vermiculata

Binomial name
- Dipsas vermiculata J. A. Peters, 1960

= Dipsas vermiculata =

Species of snake

Dipsas vermiculata, the vermiculate snail-eater, is a non-venomous snake found in Ecuador, Peru, and Colombia.
