= Dipsas vagrans =

Conservation status
- Least Concern (IUCN 3.1)

Scientific classification
- Kingdom: Animalia
- Phylum: Chordata
- Class: Reptilia
- Order: Squamata
- Suborder: Serpentes
- Family: Colubridae
- Genus: Dipsas
- Species: D. vagrans

Binomial name
- Dipsas vagrans (Dunn, 1923)

Species of snake

Dipsas vagrans, Dunn's tree snake, is a non-venomous snake found in Peru.
