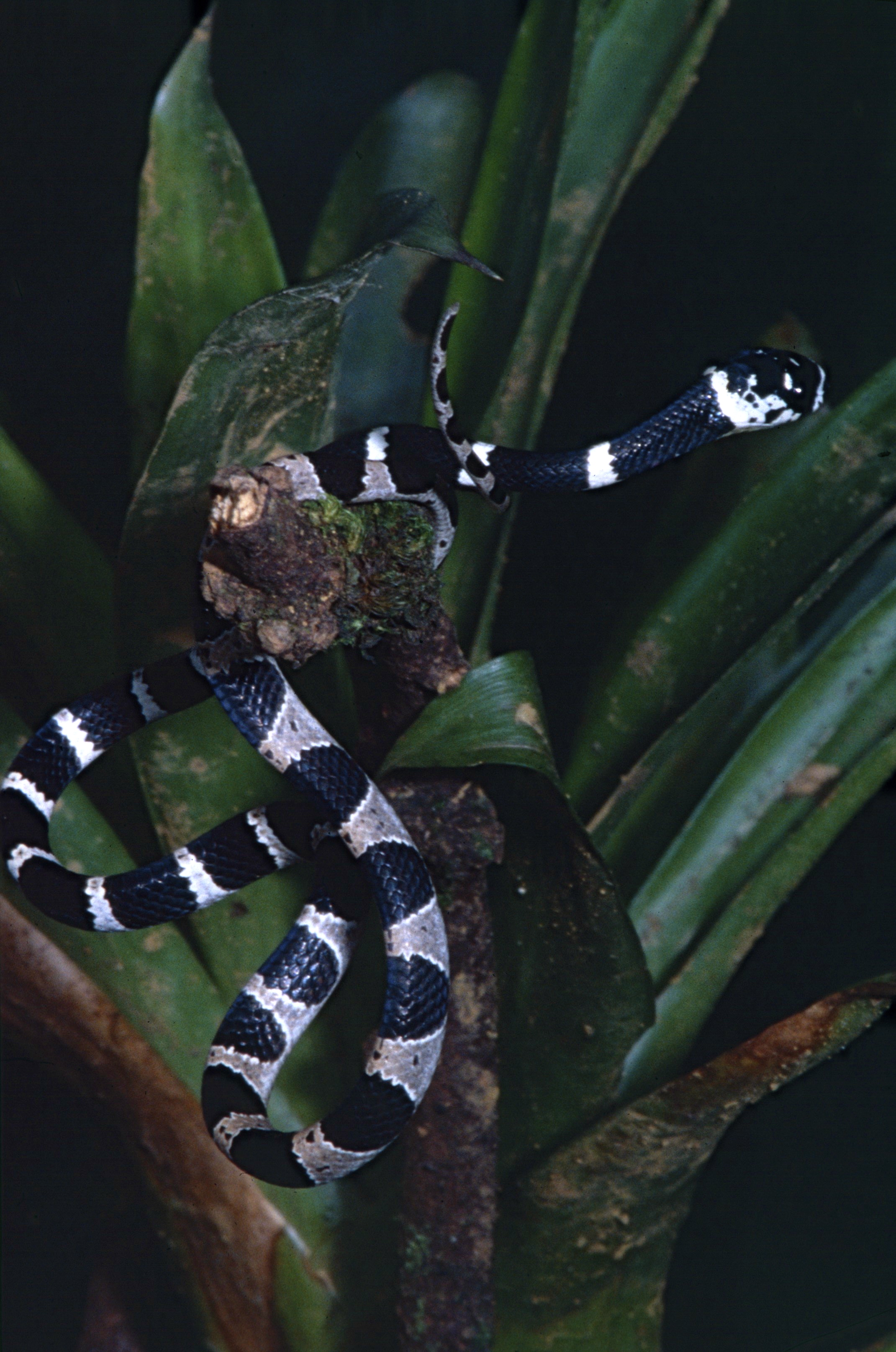

Conservation status
- Least Concern (IUCN 3.1)

Scientific classification
- Domain: Eukaryota
- Kingdom: Animalia
- Phylum: Chordata
- Class: Reptilia
- Order: Squamata
- Suborder: Serpentes
- Family: Colubridae
- Genus: Dipsas
- Species: D. pavonina

Binomial name
- Dipsas pavonina Schlegel, 1837

= Dipsas pavonina =

Species of snake

Dipsas pavonina, the northern snail-eater, is a non-venomous snake found in Guyana, Suriname, French Guiana, Venezuela, Brazil, Colombia, Bolivia, Ecuador, and Peru.
