= Dipsas peruana =

Conservation status
- Least Concern (IUCN 3.1)

Scientific classification
- Domain: Eukaryota
- Kingdom: Animalia
- Phylum: Chordata
- Class: Reptilia
- Order: Squamata
- Suborder: Serpentes
- Family: Colubridae
- Genus: Dipsas
- Species: D. peruana

Binomial name
- Dipsas peruana (Boettger, 1898)

Species of snake

Dipsas peruana, the Peruvian snail-eater or Peru snail-eater, is a non-venomous snake found in Peru, Venezuela, and Colombia, Ecuador, and Bolivia.
