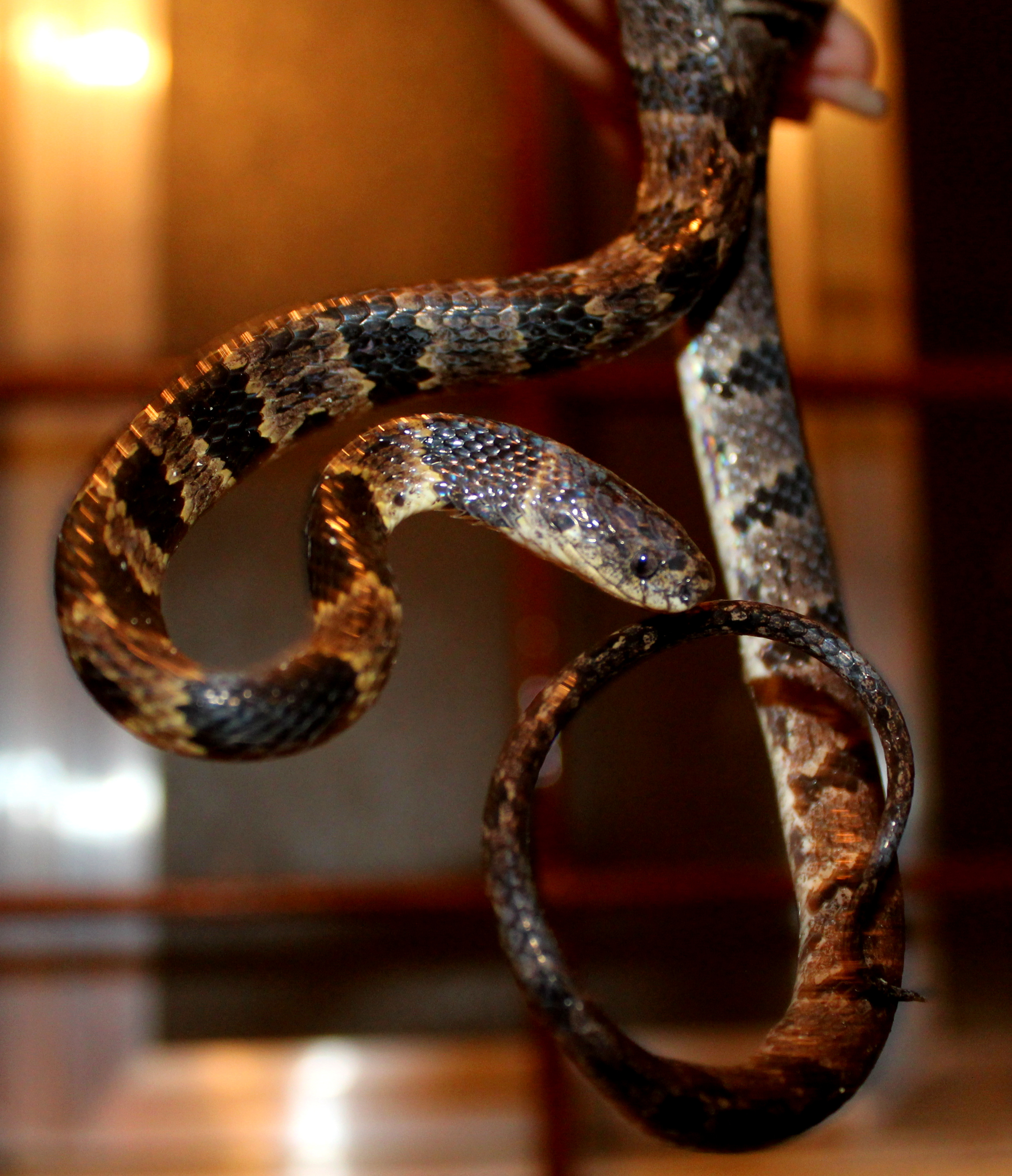

Conservation status
- Least Concern (IUCN 3.1)

Scientific classification
- Kingdom: Animalia
- Phylum: Chordata
- Class: Reptilia
- Order: Squamata
- Suborder: Serpentes
- Family: Colubridae
- Genus: Dipsas
- Species: D. neuwiedi

Binomial name
- Dipsas neuwiedi (Ihering, 1911)

Synonyms
- Cochliophagus mikani neuwiedi Ihering, 1911; Sibynomorphus neuwiedi (Ihering, 1911); Sibynomorphus mikanii fasciatus Amaral, 1930

= Dipsas neuwiedi =

Species of snake

Dipsas neuwiedi, also known commonly as Neuwied's tree snake and dormideira-cinzenta (gray sleepyhead) in Brazilian Portuguese, is a species of snake in the subfamily Dipsadinae of the family Colubridae. The species is endemic to Brazil.

== Etymology ==
The specific name, neuwiedi, is in honor of German naturalist Prince Maximilian of Wied-Neuwied.

== Description ==
A medium-sized species of snake, Dipsas neuwiedi may attain a snout-to-vent length (SVL) of 66 cm (26 in).

== Geographic distribution ==
Dipsas neuwiedi is found in southeastern Brazil.

== Habitat ==
The preferred natural habitats of Dipsas neuwiedi are forest and savanna, at elevations from sea level to 1,450 m (4,760 ft).

== Behavior ==
Dipsas neuwiedi is arboreal and nocturnal.

== Diet ==
Dipsas neuwiedi preys upon snails and slugs.

== Reproduction ==
Dipsas neuwiedi is oviparous. Clutch size is about eight eggs.
