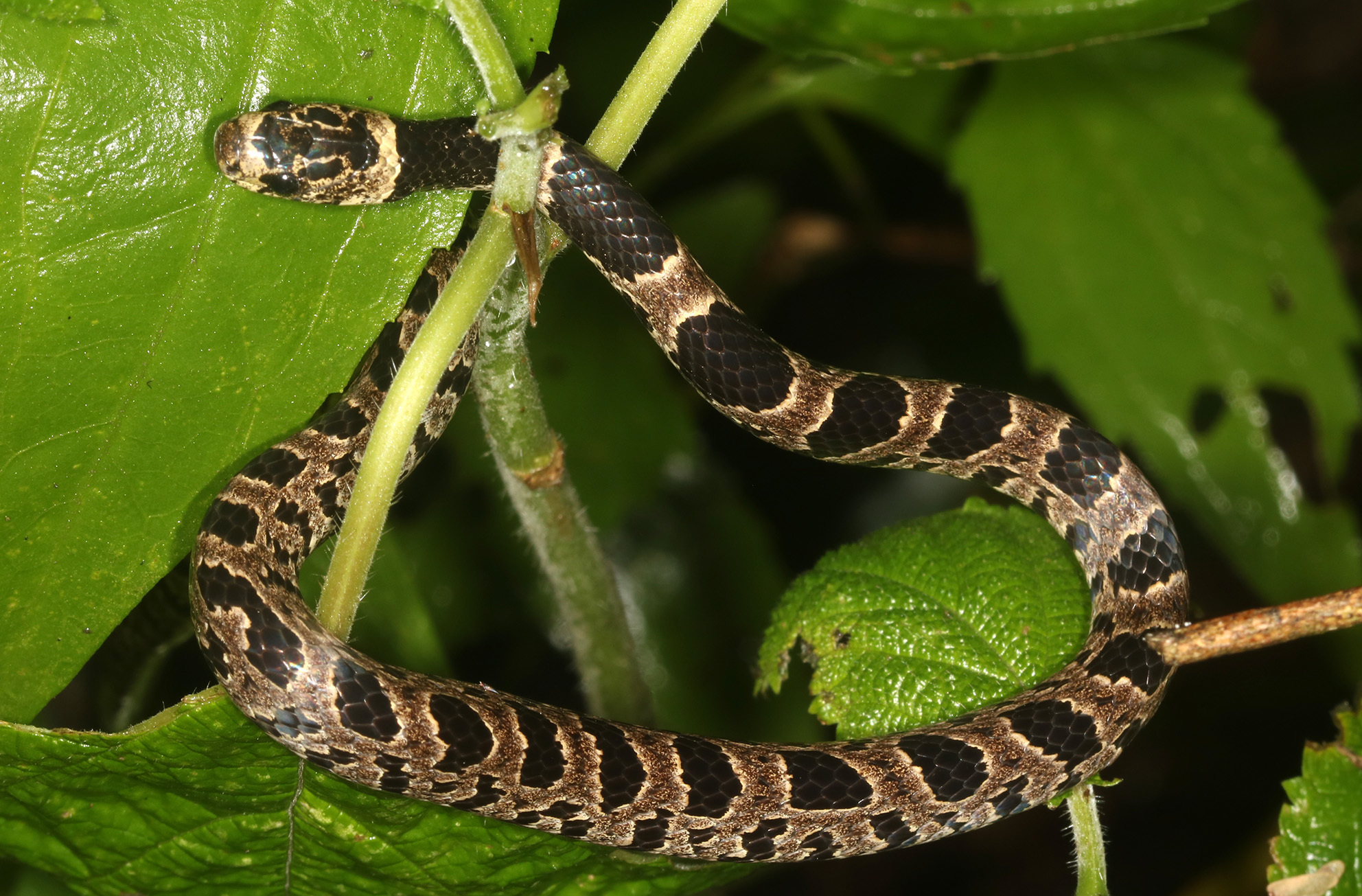

Conservation status
- Least Concern (IUCN 3.1)

Scientific classification
- Domain: Eukaryota
- Kingdom: Animalia
- Phylum: Chordata
- Class: Reptilia
- Order: Squamata
- Suborder: Serpentes
- Family: Colubridae
- Genus: Dipsas
- Species: D. turgida

Binomial name
- Dipsas turgida (Cope, 1868)

= Dipsas turgida =

Species of snake

Dipsas turgida, the Bolivian tree snake, is a species of non-venomous snake found in Paraguay, Uruguay, Bolivia, and Brazil.
