= Dipsas bothropoides =

Scientific classification
- Kingdom: Animalia
- Phylum: Chordata
- Class: Reptilia
- Order: Squamata
- Suborder: Serpentes
- Family: Colubridae
- Genus: Dipsas
- Species: D. bothropoides

Binomial name
- Dipsas bothropoides Mebert, Passos, Fernandes, Entiauspe-Neto, Queiroz-Alvez, Machado, & Lopes, 2020

Species of snake

Dipsas bothropoides is a non-venomous snake found in Brazil.
