= Dipsas lavillai =

Conservation status
- Least Concern (IUCN 3.1)

Scientific classification
- Kingdom: Animalia
- Phylum: Chordata
- Class: Reptilia
- Order: Squamata
- Suborder: Serpentes
- Family: Colubridae
- Genus: Dipsas
- Species: D. lavillai

Binomial name
- Dipsas lavillai (Scrocchi, Porto & Rey, 1993)

Synonyms
- Sibynomorphus lavillai Scrocchi, Porto & Rey, 1993

Species of snake

Dipsas lavillai, also known commonly as the neotropical tree snake and dormideira in Brazilian Portuguese, is a species of non-venomous snake in the subfamily Dipsadinae of the family Colubridae. The species is native to central South America.

== Etymology ==
The specific name, lavillai, is in honor of Argentinian herpetologist Esteban Orlando Lavilla.

== Geographic range ==
D. lavillai is found in Argentina, Bolivia, Brazil, and Paraguay.

== Habitat ==
The preferred natural habitat of D. lavillai is forest, at altitudes of 2,800–4,100 m (9,200–13,500 ft).

== Description ==
The head of D. lavillai is only slightly distinct from the neck. The eye is not visible from below. The body is cylindrical to subcylindrical in cross-section. The dorsal scales are arranged in 15 rows throughout the length of the body. The anal plate is entire (undivided). The subcaudals are paired (divided).

== Behavior ==
D. lavillai is arboreal.

== Diet ==
D. lavillai preys predominately on molluscs (slugs and snails).

== Reproduction ==
D. lavillai is oviparous.
