= Dipsas nicholsi =

Conservation status
- Least Concern (IUCN 3.1)

Scientific classification
- Domain: Eukaryota
- Kingdom: Animalia
- Phylum: Chordata
- Class: Reptilia
- Order: Squamata
- Suborder: Serpentes
- Family: Colubridae
- Genus: Dipsas
- Species: D. nicholsi

Binomial name
- Dipsas nicholsi (Dunn, 1933)

Species of snake

Dipsas nicholsi is a non-venomous snake found in Panama and Peru. It is of the family Colubridae and genus Dipsas.

== Appearance ==
Dipsas nicholsi is pale brown with black or dark brown elliptical patterns on its back and a 'V' shaped line on its head.
