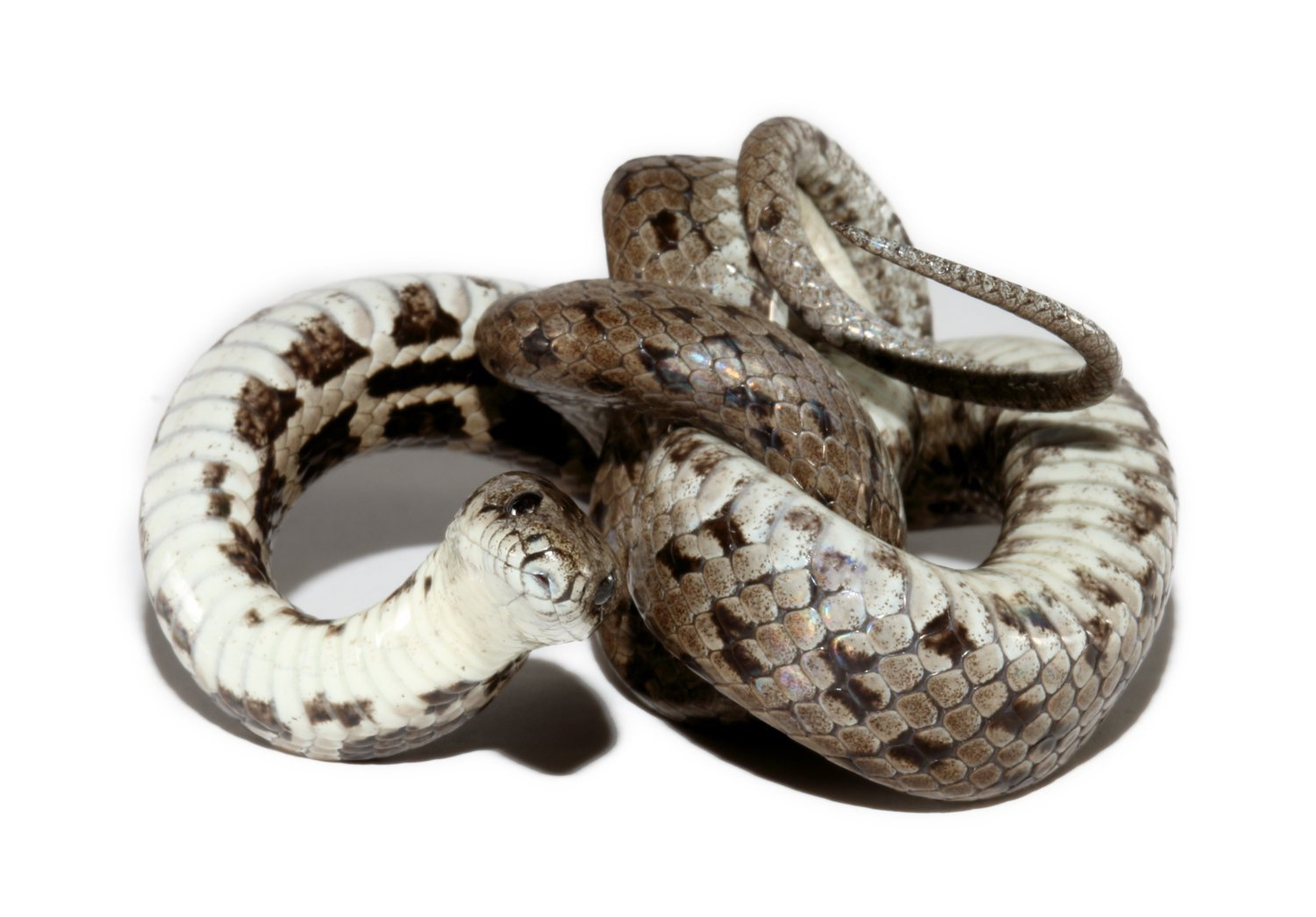

Conservation status
- Vulnerable (IUCN 3.1)

Scientific classification
- Kingdom: Animalia
- Phylum: Chordata
- Class: Reptilia
- Order: Squamata
- Suborder: Serpentes
- Family: Colubridae
- Genus: Dipsas
- Species: D. oligozonata

Binomial name
- Dipsas oligozonata (Orcés & Almendáriz, 1989)

= Dipsas oligozonata =

Species of snake

Dipsas oligozonata is a non-venomous snake found in Ecuador.
