= Dipsas copei =

Conservation status
- Least Concern (IUCN 3.1)

Scientific classification
- Domain: Eukaryota
- Kingdom: Animalia
- Phylum: Chordata
- Class: Reptilia
- Order: Squamata
- Suborder: Serpentes
- Family: Colubridae
- Genus: Dipsas
- Species: D. copei

Binomial name
- Dipsas copei (Günther, 1872)

Species of snake

Dipsas copei is a non-venomous snake found in Guyana, Suriname, French Guiana, and Venezuela.
