= Dipsas palmeri =

Scientific classification
- Domain: Eukaryota
- Kingdom: Animalia
- Phylum: Chordata
- Class: Reptilia
- Order: Squamata
- Suborder: Serpentes
- Family: Colubridae
- Genus: Dipsas
- Species: D. palmeri

Binomial name
- Dipsas palmeri (Boulenger, 1912)

Species of snake

Dipsas palmeri, Palmer's snail-eater, is a non-venomous snake found in Ecuador and Peru.
