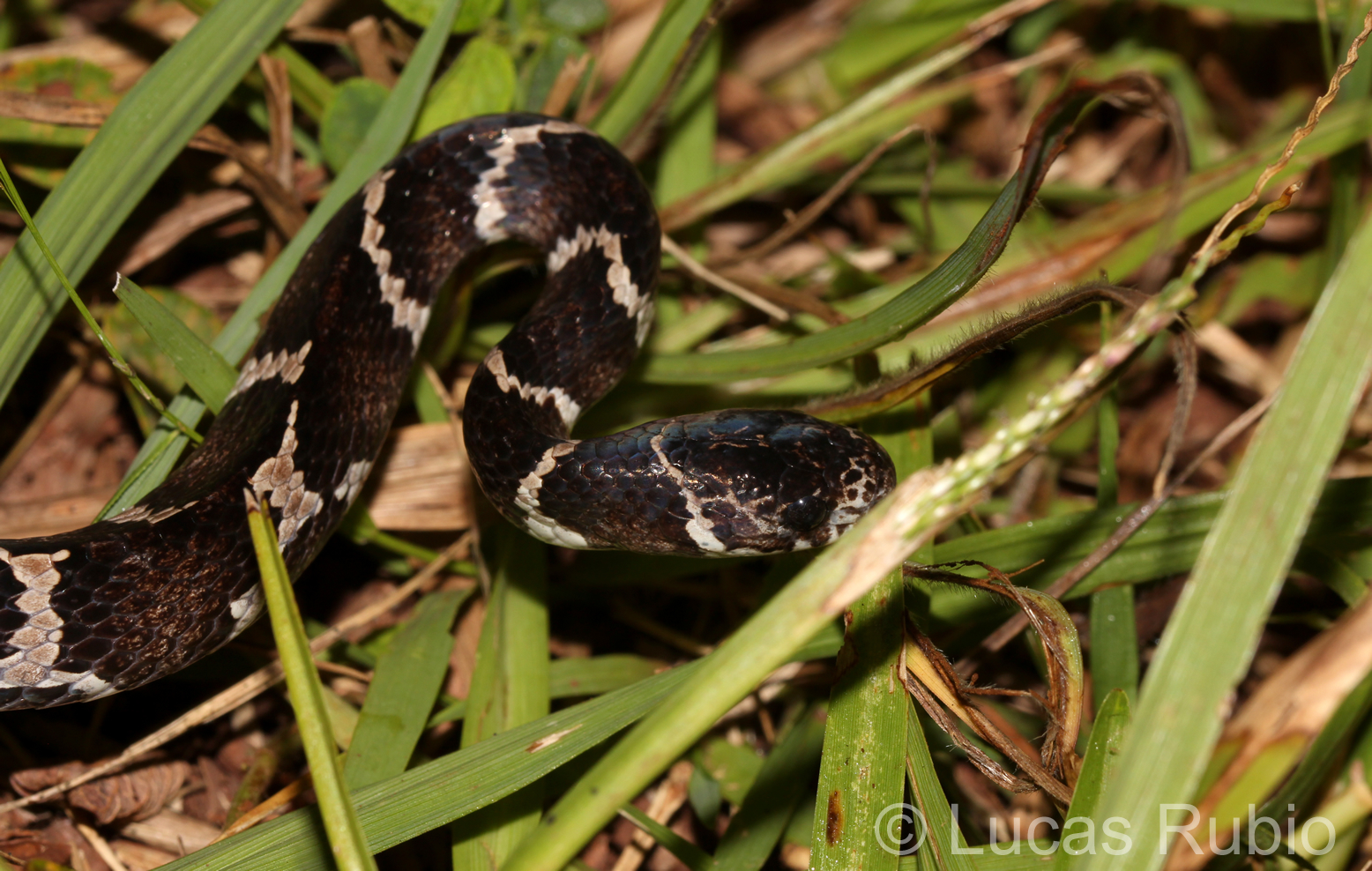

Conservation status
- Least Concern (IUCN 3.1)

Scientific classification
- Domain: Eukaryota
- Kingdom: Animalia
- Phylum: Chordata
- Class: Reptilia
- Order: Squamata
- Suborder: Serpentes
- Family: Colubridae
- Genus: Dipsas
- Species: D. ventrimaculata

Binomial name
- Dipsas ventrimaculata (Boulenger, 1885)

= Dipsas ventrimaculata =

Species of snake

Dipsas ventrimaculata, Boulenger's tree snake, is a non-venomous snake found in Paraguay, Argentina, and Brazil.
