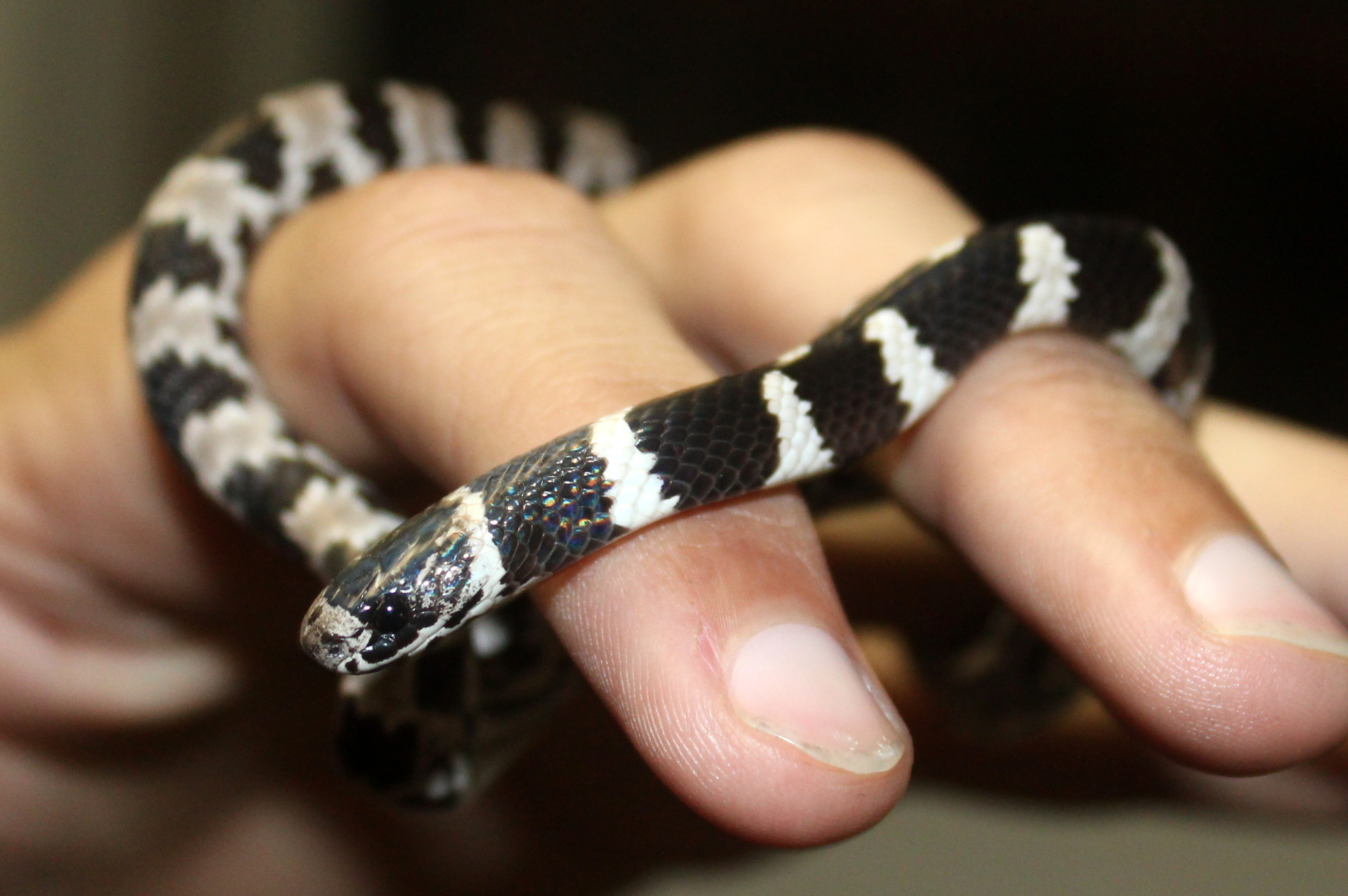

Conservation status
- Least Concern (IUCN 3.1)

Scientific classification
- Kingdom: Animalia
- Phylum: Chordata
- Class: Reptilia
- Order: Squamata
- Suborder: Serpentes
- Family: Colubridae
- Genus: Dipsas
- Species: D. mikanii

Binomial name
- Dipsas mikanii Schlegel, 1837

Synonyms
- Anholodon mikanii (Schlegel, 1837); Cochliophagus mikani (Schlegel, 1837); Leptognathus mikanii (Schlegel, 1837); Sibynomorphus mikanii (Schlegel, 1837); Leptognathus garmani Cope, 1887; Sibynomorphus garmani (Cope, 1887)

= Dipsas mikanii =

Species of snake

Dipsas mikanii is a species of snake in the subfamily Dipsadinae of the family Colubridae. The species is native to eastern South America.

== Etymology ==
The specific name, mikanii, is in honor of German biologist Johann Christian Mikan.

== Geographic distribution ==
Dipsas mikanii is found in Argentina, eastern Brazil, and Paraguay.

== Habitat ==
The preferred natural habitats of Dipsas mikanii are forest and savanna, at elevations from sea level to 1,350 m (4,430 ft).

== Behavior ==
Dipsas mikanii is terrestrial, semiarboreal, and nocturnal.

== Diet ==
Dipsas mikanii preys predominately upon mollusks, slugs, and snails.

== Reproduction ==
Dipsas mikanii is oviparous. Females lay eggs in communal nests.
