= Dipsas praeornata =

Scientific classification
- Kingdom: Animalia
- Phylum: Chordata
- Class: Reptilia
- Order: Squamata
- Suborder: Serpentes
- Family: Colubridae
- Genus: Dipsas
- Species: D. praeornata

Binomial name
- Dipsas praeornata (Werner, 1909)

Species of snake

Dipsas praeornata is a non-venomous snake found in Venezuela.
