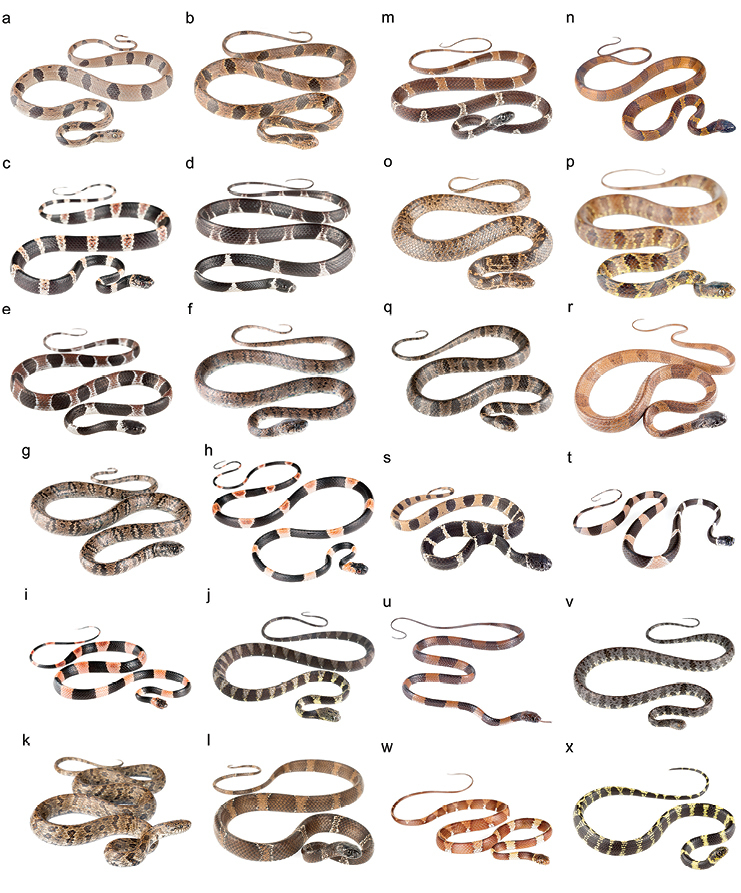
- Species of Dipsas

Conservation status
- Endangered (IUCN 3.1)

Scientific classification
- Domain: Eukaryota
- Kingdom: Animalia
- Phylum: Chordata
- Class: Reptilia
- Order: Squamata
- Suborder: Serpentes
- Family: Colubridae
- Genus: Dipsas
- Species: D. ellipsifera

Binomial name
- Dipsas ellipsifera (Boulenger, 1898)

= Dipsas ellipsifera =

Species of snake

Dipsas ellipsifera is a non-venomous snake found in Ecuador and Colombia.
