= Dipsas sazimai =

Conservation status
- Least Concern (IUCN 3.1)

Scientific classification
- Kingdom: Animalia
- Phylum: Chordata
- Class: Reptilia
- Order: Squamata
- Suborder: Serpentes
- Family: Colubridae
- Genus: Dipsas
- Species: D. sazimai

Binomial name
- Dipsas sazimai Fernandes, Marques, & Argôlo, 2010

Species of snake

Dipsas sazimai is a non-venomous snake found in Brazil.
