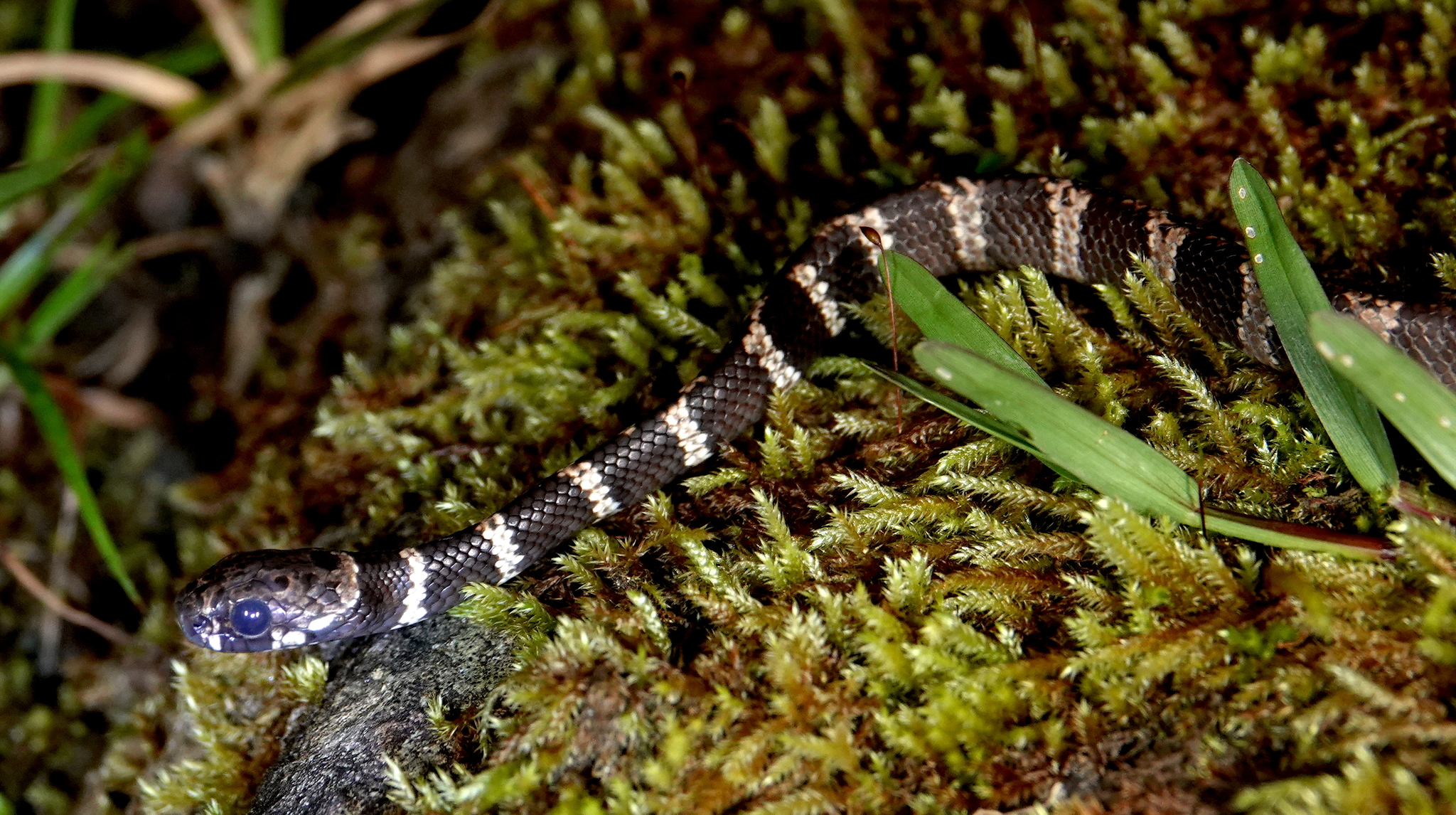

Conservation status
- Least Concern (IUCN 3.1)

Scientific classification
- Kingdom: Animalia
- Phylum: Chordata
- Class: Reptilia
- Order: Squamata
- Suborder: Serpentes
- Family: Colubridae
- Genus: Dipsas
- Species: D. sanctijoannis

Binomial name
- Dipsas sanctijoannis (Boulenger, 1911)

= Dipsas sanctijoannis =

Species of snake

Dipsas sanctijoannis, the tropical snail-eater, is a non-venomous snake found in Colombia.
