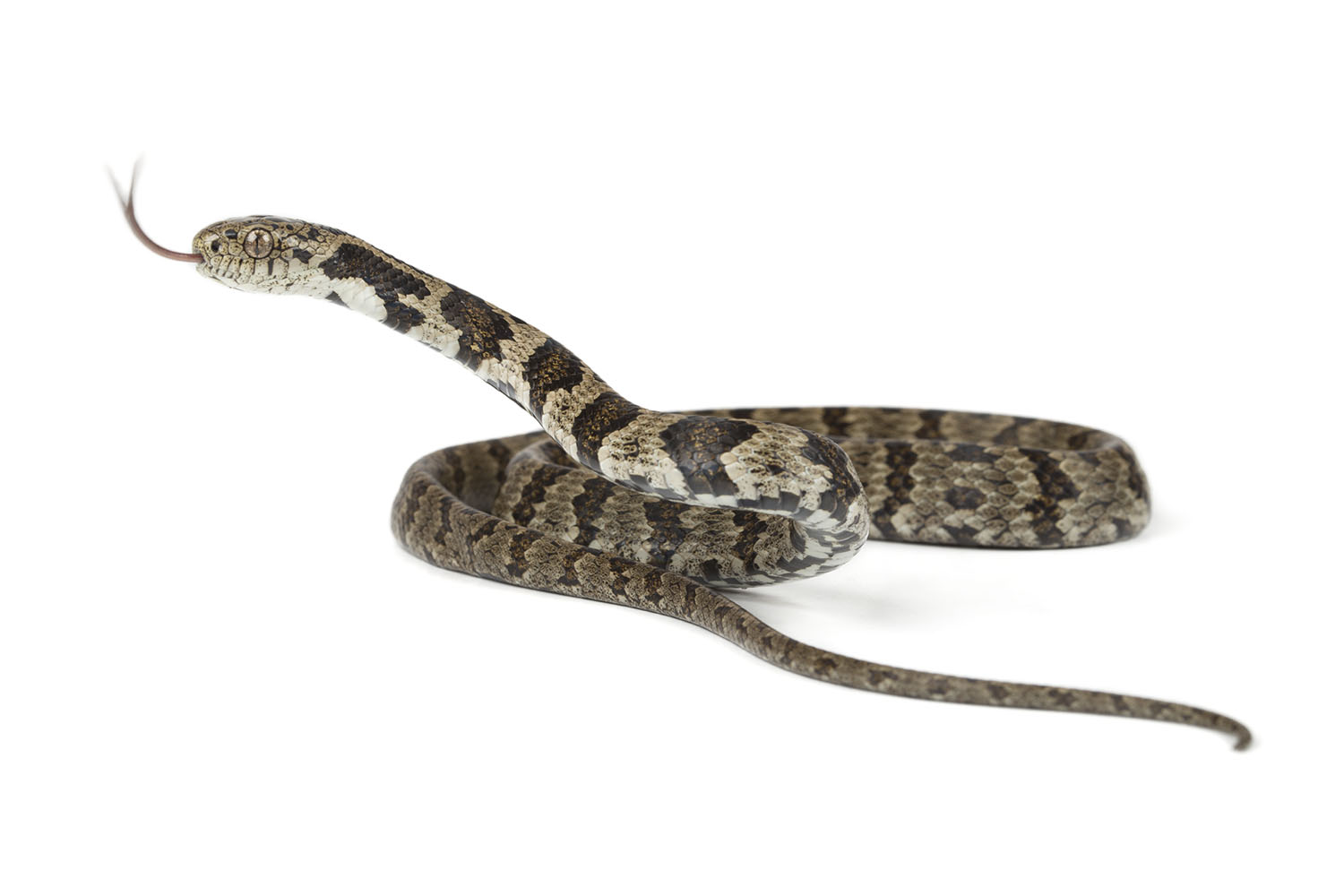

Conservation status
- Least Concern (IUCN 3.1)

Scientific classification
- Kingdom: Animalia
- Phylum: Chordata
- Class: Reptilia
- Order: Squamata
- Suborder: Serpentes
- Family: Colubridae
- Genus: Dipsas
- Species: D. jamespetersi

Binomial name
- Dipsas jamespetersi (Orcés & Almendáriz, 1989)

Synonyms
- Sibynomorphus petersi Orcés & Almendáriz, 1989

= Dipsas jamespetersi =

Species of snake

Dipsas jamespetersi is a species of non-venomous snake in the subfamily Dipsadinae of the family Colubridae. The species is native to northwestern South America.

== Etymology ==
The specific name, jamespetersi, is in honor of American herpetologist James A. Peters.

== Description ==
Large for its genus, Dipsas jamespetersi may attain a total length (tail included) of 77 cm (30 in).

== Geographic distribution ==
Dipsas jamespetersi is found in on the western slopes of the Andes in southwestern Ecuador and northern Peru.

== Habitat ==
Dipsas jamespetersi is found in a variety of habitats, including forest, savanna, shrubland, and grassland, at elevations of 1,250–3,120 m (4,100–10,240 ft).

== Behavior ==
Dipsas jamespetersi is mainly arboreal.

== Diet ==
Dipsas jamespetersi preys predominately upon mollusks such as slugs and land snails.

== Reproduction ==
Dipsas jamespetersi is oviparous.
