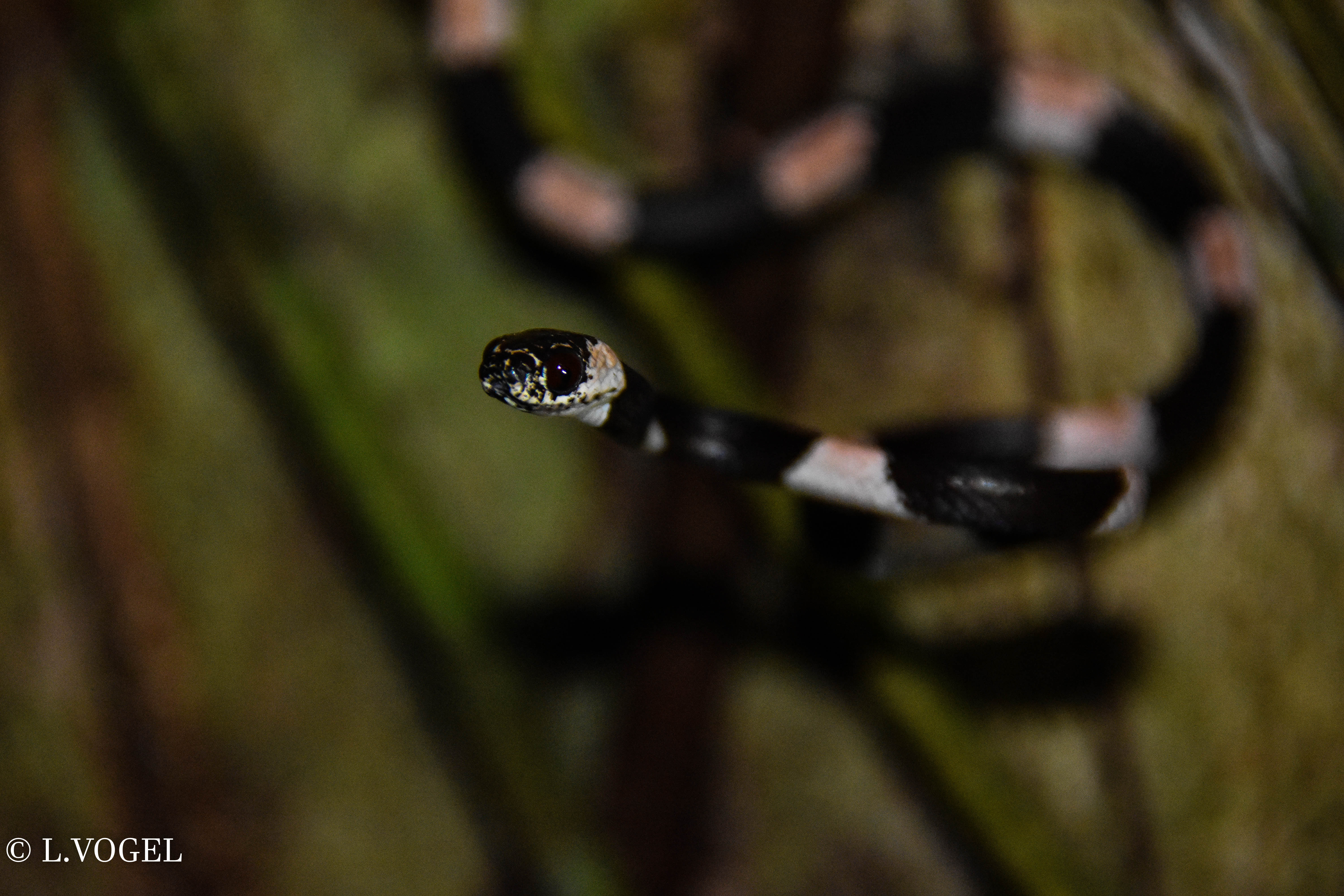

Conservation status
- Least Concern (IUCN 3.1)

Scientific classification
- Domain: Eukaryota
- Kingdom: Animalia
- Phylum: Chordata
- Class: Reptilia
- Order: Squamata
- Suborder: Serpentes
- Family: Colubridae
- Genus: Dipsas
- Species: D. bicolor

Binomial name
- Dipsas bicolor (Günther, 1895)

= Dipsas bicolor =

Species of snake

Dipsas bicolor, the two-colored snail-eater, is a non-venomous snake found in Honduras, Nicaragua, and Costa Rica.
