= Dipsas maxillaris =

Conservation status
- Data Deficient (IUCN 3.1)

Scientific classification
- Domain: Eukaryota
- Kingdom: Animalia
- Phylum: Chordata
- Class: Reptilia
- Order: Squamata
- Suborder: Serpentes
- Family: Colubridae
- Genus: Dipsas
- Species: D. maxillaris

Binomial name
- Dipsas maxillaris (Werner, 1910)

Species of snake

Dipsas maxillaris, Werner's thirst snake, is a non-venomous snake found in Mexico.
