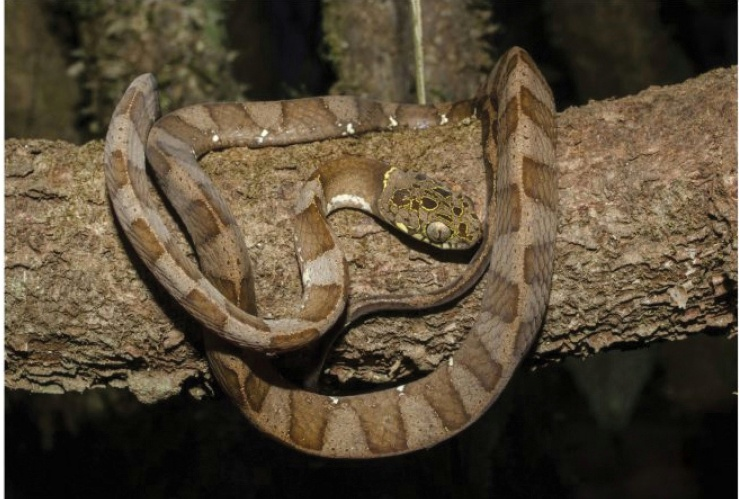

Conservation status
- Least Concern (IUCN 3.1)

Scientific classification
- Kingdom: Animalia
- Phylum: Chordata
- Class: Reptilia
- Order: Squamata
- Suborder: Serpentes
- Family: Colubridae
- Genus: Dipsas
- Species: D. indica

Binomial name
- Dipsas indica Laurenti, 1768

= Dipsas indica =

Species of snake

Dipsas indica, also known commonly as the neotropical snail-eater, is a species of snake in the subfamily Dipsadinae of the family Colubridae. The species is native to South America. There are three recognized subspecies.

== Geographic distribution ==
Dipsas indica is found in Bolivia, Brazil, Colombia, Ecuador, French Guiana, Guyana, Peru, Suriname, and Venezuela.

== Habitat ==
The preferred natural habitat of Dipsas indica is forest, at elevations from near sea level to 800 m (2,600 ft).

== Behavior ==
Dipsas indica is nocturnal and arboreal.

== Diet ==
Dipsas indica preys on slugs and land snails. The snake can extract snails from their shells using its slender jaw.

== Reproduction ==
Dipsas indica is oviparous.

== Subspecies ==
There are three subspecies that are recognized as being valid, including the nominotypical subspecies.

- Dipsas indica indica Laurenti, 1768
- Dipsas indica ecuadoriensis J. Peters, 1960 – Amazonian piedmont of Ecuador
- Dipsas indica petersi Hoge & Romano-Hoge, 1975 – Atlantic slopes of the coastal range of southeastern Brazil

== Etymology ==
The subspecific name, petersi, is in honor of American herpetologist James A. Peters.
