= Dipsas viguieri =

Conservation status
- Least Concern (IUCN 3.1)

Scientific classification
- Domain: Eukaryota
- Kingdom: Animalia
- Phylum: Chordata
- Class: Reptilia
- Order: Squamata
- Suborder: Serpentes
- Family: Colubridae
- Genus: Dipsas
- Species: D. viguieri

Binomial name
- Dipsas viguieri (Bocourt, 1884)

Species of snake

Dipsas viguieri, Bocourt's snail-eater, is a non-venomous snake found in Panama, and Colombia.
