= Dipsas alternans =

Conservation status
- Least Concern (IUCN 3.1)

Scientific classification
- Kingdom: Animalia
- Phylum: Chordata
- Class: Reptilia
- Order: Squamata
- Suborder: Serpentes
- Family: Colubridae
- Genus: Dipsas
- Species: D. alternans

Binomial name
- Dipsas alternans (Fischer, 1885)

Species of snake

Dipsas alternans, Jan's snail-eater, is a non-venomous snake found in Brazil.
