= Dipsas trinitatis =

Conservation status
- Least Concern (IUCN 3.1)

Scientific classification
- Domain: Eukaryota
- Kingdom: Animalia
- Phylum: Chordata
- Class: Reptilia
- Order: Squamata
- Suborder: Serpentes
- Family: Colubridae
- Genus: Dipsas
- Species: D. trinitatis

Binomial name
- Dipsas trinitatis Parker, 1926

Species of snake

Dipsas trinitatis, the Trinidad snail-eater, is a non-venomous snake found in Trinidad.
