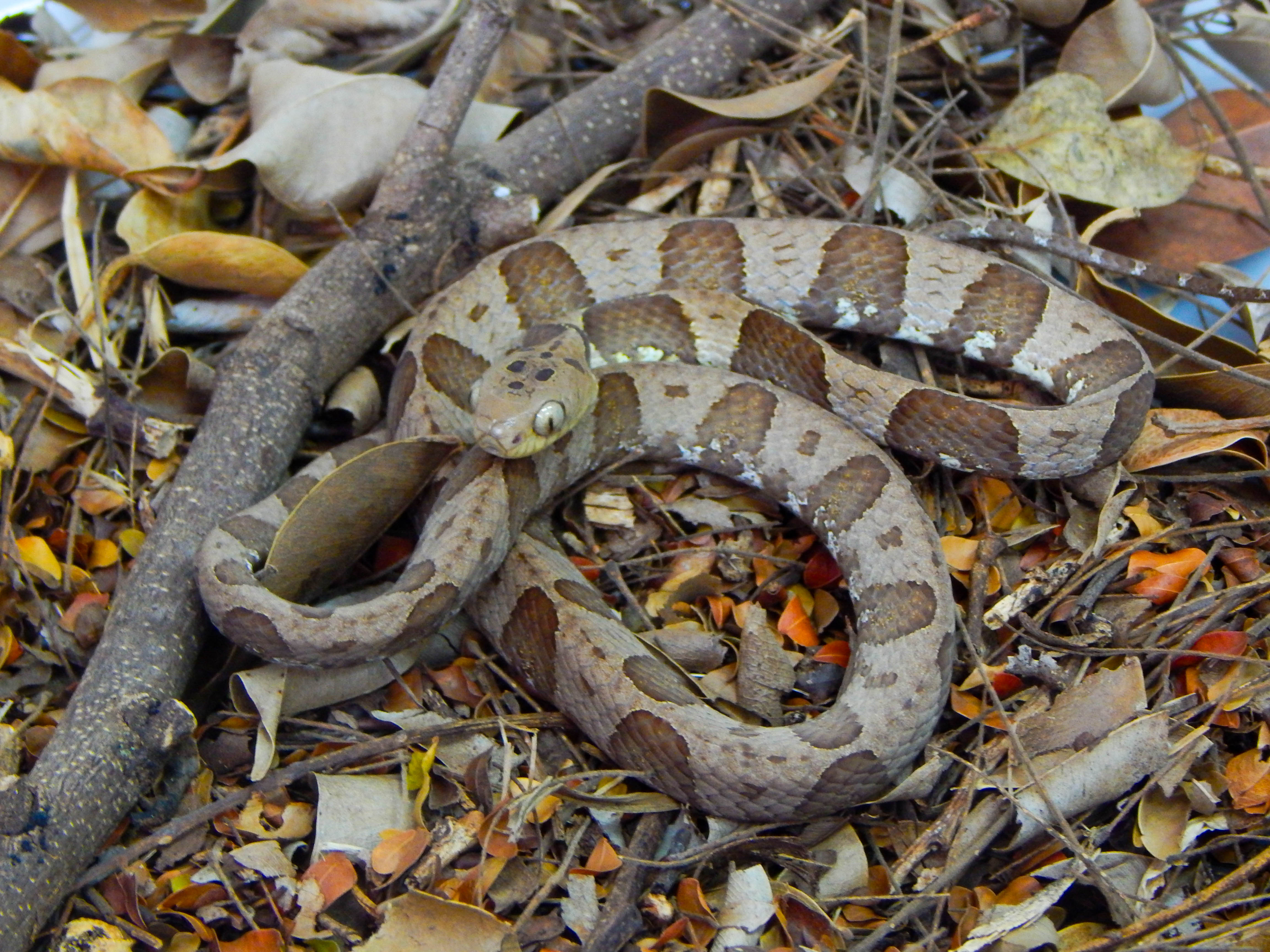

Conservation status
- Least Concern (IUCN 3.1)

Scientific classification
- Kingdom: Animalia
- Phylum: Chordata
- Class: Reptilia
- Order: Squamata
- Suborder: Serpentes
- Family: Colubridae
- Genus: Dipsas
- Species: D. bucephala

Binomial name
- Dipsas bucephala (Shaw, 1802)

= Dipsas bucephala =

Species of snake

Dipsas bucephala, the neotropical snail-eater, is a non-venomous snake found in Brazil, Paraguay, Bolivia, and Argentina.
