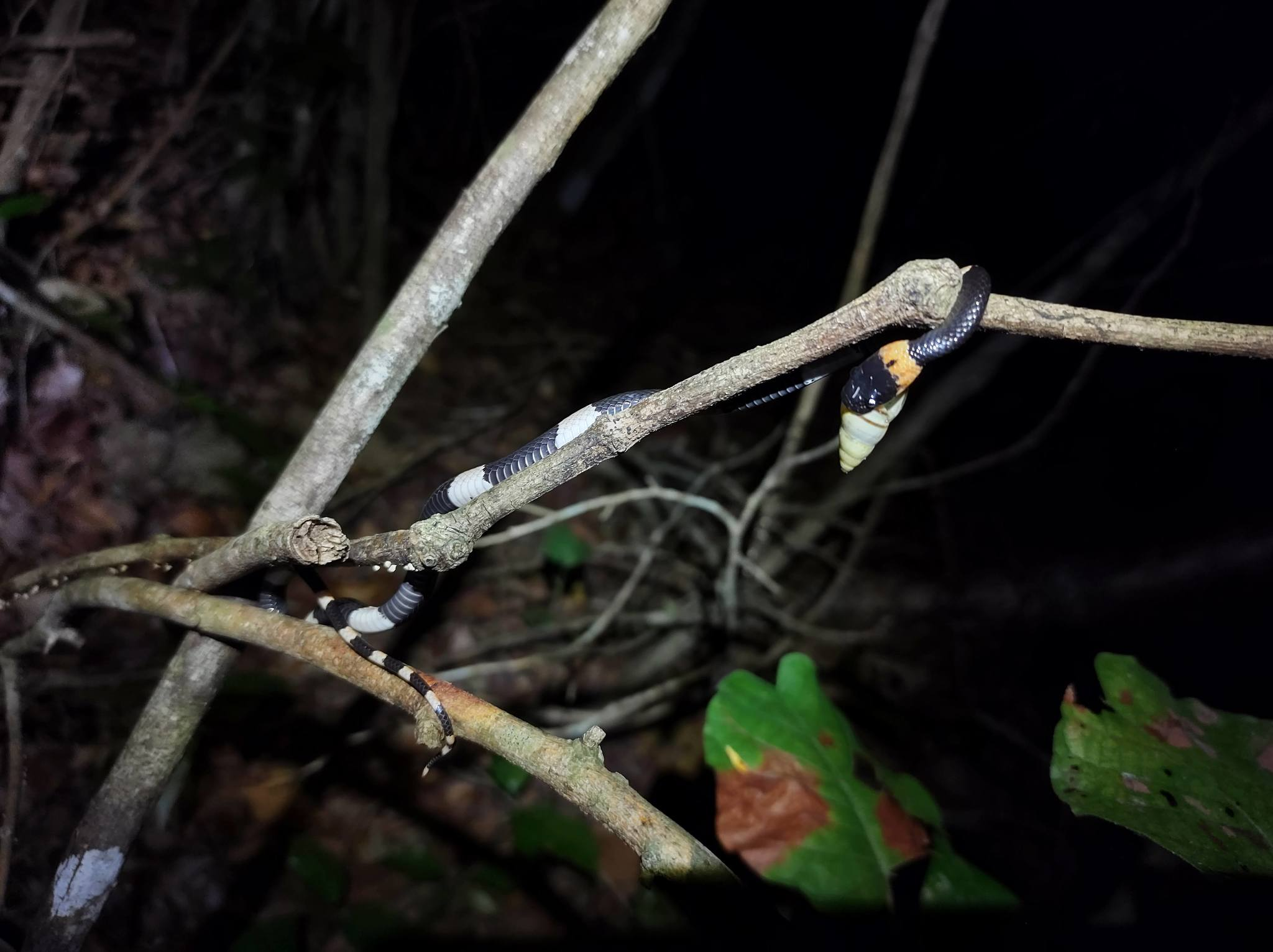
- Eating Mesembrinus tropicalis

Conservation status
- Least Concern (IUCN 3.1)

Scientific classification
- Domain: Eukaryota
- Kingdom: Animalia
- Phylum: Chordata
- Class: Reptilia
- Order: Squamata
- Suborder: Serpentes
- Family: Colubridae
- Subfamily: Dipsadinae
- Genus: Dipsas
- Species: D. brevifacies

Binomial name
- Dipsas brevifacies (Cope, 1866)

Synonyms
- Tropidodipsas brevifacies (Cope, 1866)

= Dipsas brevifacies =

Species of snake

Dipsas brevifacies, the snail-eating thirst snake or short-faced snail-eater, is a non-venomous snake found in Mexico, Belize and Guatemala. Its length for male is approximately 373 mm and for female 357 mm, (minimum 131 mm). They are oviparous in nature.

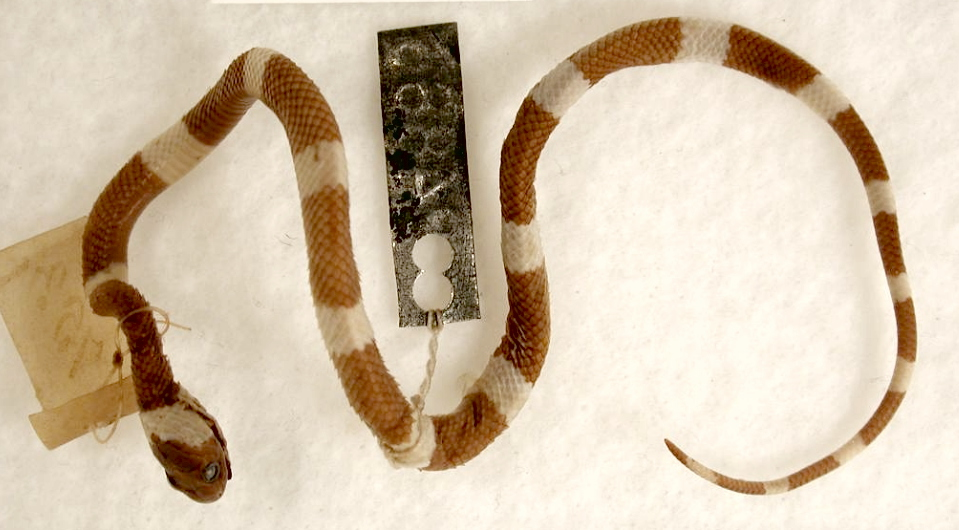
Holotype, at the Smithsonian Institution
