= Dipsas incerta =

Conservation status
- Data Deficient (IUCN 3.1)

Scientific classification
- Domain: Eukaryota
- Kingdom: Animalia
- Phylum: Chordata
- Class: Reptilia
- Order: Squamata
- Suborder: Serpentes
- Family: Colubridae
- Genus: Dipsas
- Species: D. incerta

Binomial name
- Dipsas incerta (Jan, 1863)

Species of snake

Dipsas incerta, Jan's snail-eater, is a non-venomous snake found in French Guiana, Suriname, Guiana, and Brazil.
