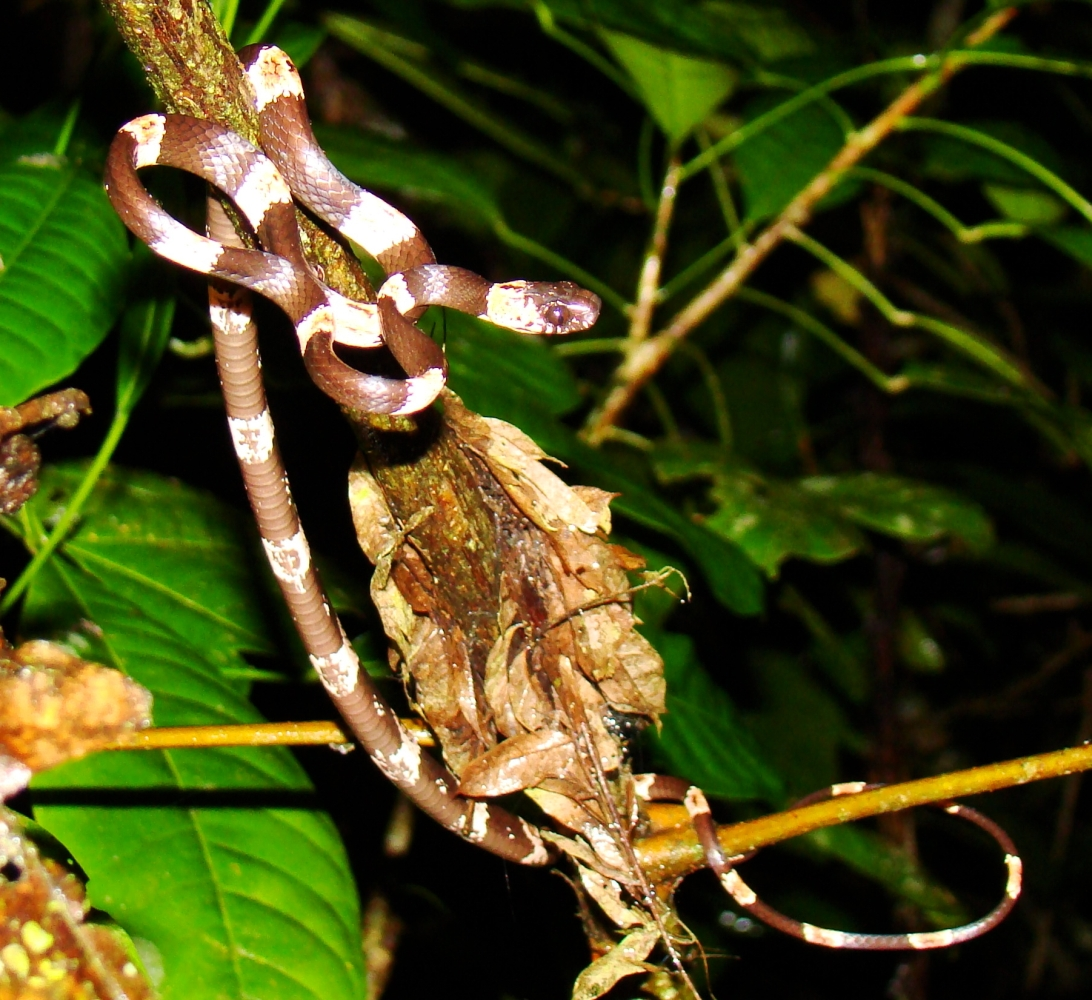

Conservation status
- Least Concern (IUCN 3.1)

Scientific classification
- Domain: Eukaryota
- Kingdom: Animalia
- Phylum: Chordata
- Class: Reptilia
- Order: Squamata
- Suborder: Serpentes
- Family: Colubridae
- Genus: Dipsas
- Species: D. gracilis

Binomial name
- Dipsas gracilis (Boulenger, 1902)

Synonyms
- Leptognathus gracilis Boulenger, 1902; Leptognathus hammondii Boulenger, 1920; Sibynomorphus macrostomus Amaral, 1925

= Dipsas gracilis =

Species of snake

Dipsas gracilis, the graceful snail-eater, is a non-venomous snake found in the northern part of South America (NW Ecuador, Peru, and Colombia). No subspecies are currently recognized.
