= Dipsas cisticeps =

Conservation status
- Least Concern (IUCN 3.1)

Scientific classification
- Domain: Eukaryota
- Kingdom: Animalia
- Phylum: Chordata
- Class: Reptilia
- Order: Squamata
- Suborder: Serpentes
- Family: Colubridae
- Genus: Dipsas
- Species: D. cisticeps

Binomial name
- Dipsas cisticeps (Boettger, 1885)

Species of snake

Dipsas cisticeps, the neotropical snail-eater, is a non-venomous snake found in Bolivia, Argentina, and Paraguay.
