= Dipsas gaigeae =

Conservation status
- Least Concern (IUCN 3.1)

Scientific classification
- Kingdom: Animalia
- Phylum: Chordata
- Class: Reptilia
- Order: Squamata
- Suborder: Serpentes
- Family: Colubridae
- Genus: Dipsas
- Species: D. gaigeae

Binomial name
- Dipsas gaigeae (Oliver, 1937)

Synonyms
- Sibynomorphus gaigeae Oliver, 1937; Dipsas gaigeae — Liner, 1994

Species of snake

Dipsas gaigeae, also known commonly as Gaige's thirst snail-eater, Gaige's thirst snake, and zicatlinán in Mexican Spanish, is a species of non-venomous snake in the family Colubridae. The species is endemic to Mexico.

== Etymology ==
The specific name, gaigeae, is in honor of American herpetologist Helen Beulah Thompson Gaige.

== Geographic range ==
D. gaigeae is found in western Mexico, in the states of Colima, Guerrero, and Jalisco.

== Habitat ==
The preferred natural habitat of D. gaigeae, is forest.

== Behavior ==
D. gaigeae is fully arboreal.

== Reproduction ==
D. gaigeae is oviparous.
