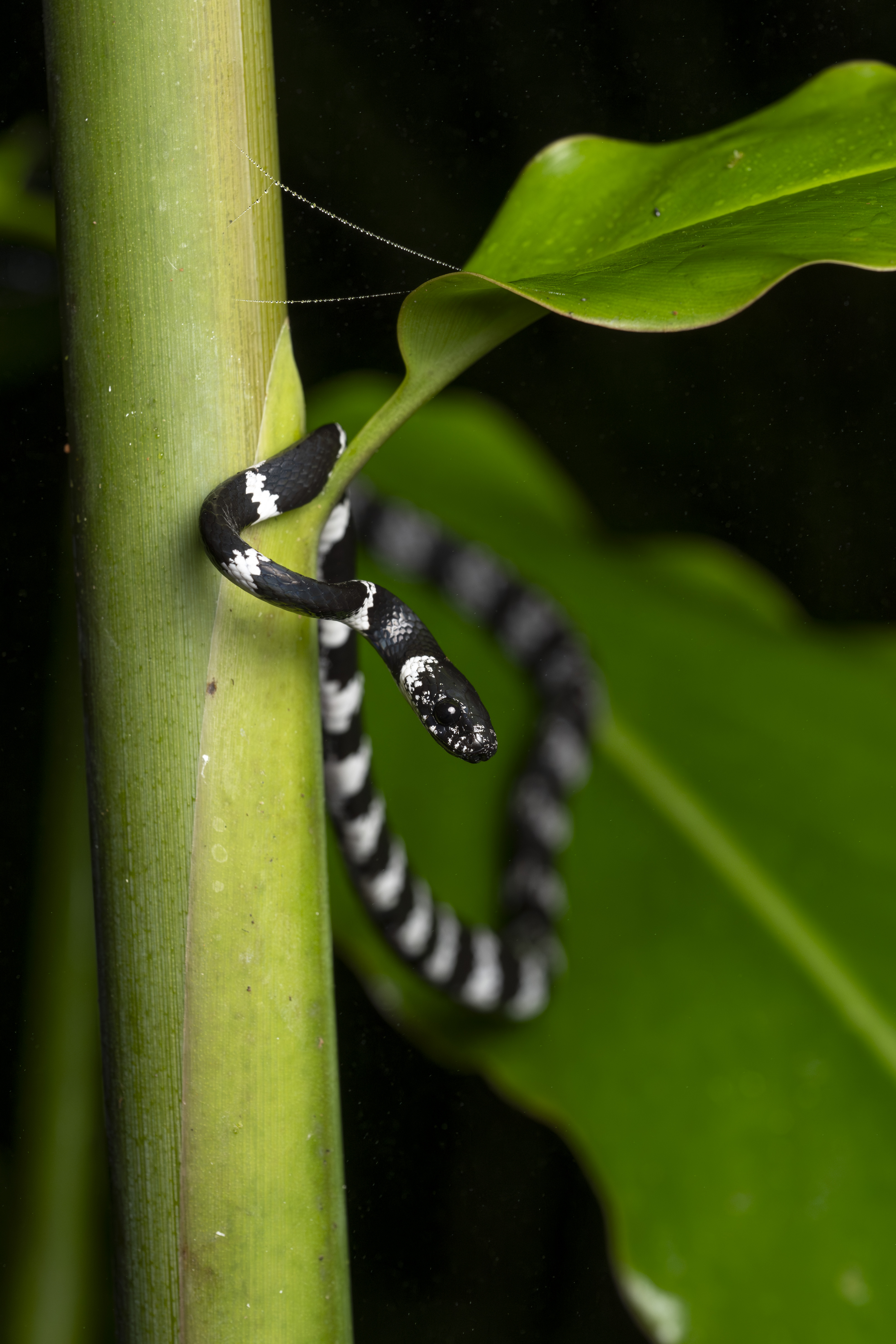

Conservation status
- Near Threatened (IUCN 3.1)

Scientific classification
- Domain: Eukaryota
- Kingdom: Animalia
- Phylum: Chordata
- Class: Reptilia
- Order: Squamata
- Suborder: Serpentes
- Family: Colubridae
- Genus: Dipsas
- Species: D. tenuissima

Binomial name
- Dipsas tenuissima Taylor, 1954

= Dipsas tenuissima =

Species of snake

Dipsas tenuissima, Taylor's snail-eater, is a non-venomous snake found in Panama and Costa Rica.
