= Mercedes S. Foster =

Zoologist and botanist

Mercedes Suarez Foster
- Born: August 16, 1942 (age 84); Oakland, California
- Education: University of California, Berkeley; University of South Florida
- Scientific career
- Fields: Vertebrate Biology, Birds
- Workplaces: University of South Florida; University of California, Berkeley; US Fish and Wildlife Service; National Museum of Natural History
- Author abbrev. (botany): Merc.S.Foster
- Author abbrev. (zoology): M. Foster, M.S. Foster

Mercedes Suarez Foster (born August 16, 1942) is an American zoologist who researched the evolution of lek behavior in birds, bird-plant interactions, and male-male cooperation in reproduction. She is very active in conservation efforts, including training workshops, being a Scientific Advisor for the National Bio-inventory Program of Paraguay, as a Founding Director of the American Bird Conservancy, and as a Founder and Co-coordinator of the Latin American Library Enhancement Program. She is also the Director and Editor of a program to publish handbooks giving "standard methods for measuring and monitoring the biodiversity of different groups of organisms".

== Life and career ==
Foster was born in Oakland, California on August 16, 1942. She was not born into an outdoorsy family and so did not have much interaction with wildlife and the outdoors until her senior year of college at the University of California, Berkeley. She took a vertebrate natural history course and decided to study biology in graduate school instead of going into medical school. She graduated with a BA in zoology in 1963. She completed her MA in zoology with a minor in Botany in 1965 also from the University of California, Berkeley, where she was also a Curatorial Assistant in 1964. She was a Curatorial Assistant at the Los Angeles County Museum of Natural History in 1966. She then went on to the University of South Florida in Tampa for her PhD in biology, where she graduated in 1974.

From 1975 to 1977 she was a Curatorial Associate in Ornithology at the Museum of Vertebrate Zoology at the University of California, Berkeley. She was a research associate there until 1980. In 1980 she became the Curator of Birds for the National Ecology Research Center of the U.S. Fish and Wildlife Service at the National Museum of Natural History. She then worked for the National Biological Service at the museum as a curator of Birds from 1993 to 1995. From 1995 onward she has been the Curator of Birds for the U.S. Geological Survey Putuxent Wildlife Research Center at the museum, becoming curator in charge in 2003. She was also a research associate at the Department of Vertebrate Zoology at the Smithsonian Institution from 1984 to 1990 and at the Natural History Museum of Los Angeles County from 1979 to 1982.

She is a research zoologist and Curator-in-Charge of the Bird Section at the National Museum of Natural History as well as being the Director and editor of the Standard Methods for Measuring and Monitoring Biological Diversity Project since 1990. This project aims to develop and publish standard methods for measuring and monitoring biological diversity.

== Honors and awards ==
Foster was elected into the Washington Biologist's Field Club in 1995. She was the club's first female member.

She has won a number of awards including the Alexander Skutch Medal for Excellence in Tropical Ornithology in 2006 by the Association of Field Ornithologists, The Outstanding Service Award in 1997 by the Cocha Cashu Biological Station, the Scientific Achievement Award in 1996 by the USGS Biological Resources Division, the Outstanding Performance Award in 1994 by the National Biological Service, Outstanding Performance Awards by the Fish and Wildlife Service in 1980, 1981, 1982, 1983, 1984, and 1985, and the Brazier Howell Award in 1967 by the Cooper Ornithological Society. She is an honorary member of the Sociedad Antioqueña de Ornitología, Colombia and the Museo Nacional Historia Natural, Paraguay. She is a Fellow of the American Association for the Advancement of Science and an elective member in 1976 and Fellow in 1980 of the American Ornithologists' Union. She was the 26th Paul L. Errington Memorial lecturer at Iowa State University and the 10th Pelican lecturer at Wooster College.

She is also a member of a number of societies including the Cooper Ornithological Society where she was President, on the council and in two committees and the Neotropical Ornithological Society where she was the chair of a committee. She has also been on other committees and boards and served as an advisor for the National Bio-Inventory Program of Paraguay and the National Museum of Natural History, Paraguay.

She was also honored in a synonym of the Sierra de Lema flycatcher (Mionectes roraimae (Chubb, C), 1919) which was published as Mionectes roraimae mercedesfosterae Dickerman & Phelps, WH Jr 1987.
