= Alejandro Arteaga =

Ecuadorian-Venezuelan biologist

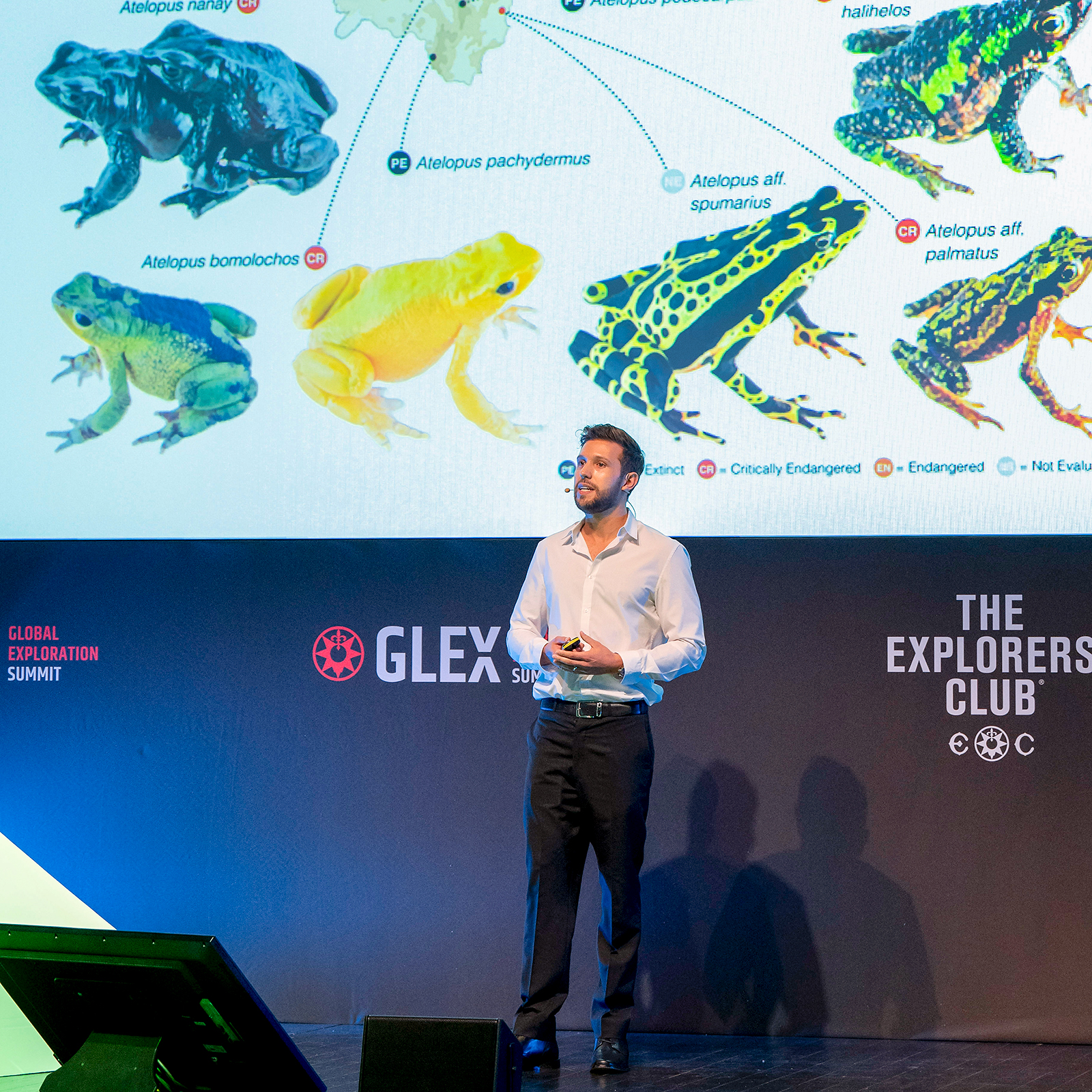
Alejandro Arteaga shares the story about the extinctions of the harlequin toads (genus Atelopus) during the Global Exploration Summit (GLEX) in the Azores in 2023.

Alejandro Arteaga (born September 16, 1991) is an Ecuadorian-Venezuelan herpetologist and explorer known as the author of several books on reptiles and amphibians of Ecuador and as the discoverer of 42 new species. He co-founded the Arteaga Species Discovery Fund in collaboration with former President of Ecuador Rosalía Arteaga. He is also known for his wildlife photography, and as a co-founder of Tropical Herping, a wildlife tourism agency.

== Early life ==
Arteaga was born on September 16, 1991, in Caracas, Venezuela, and later moved to Quito, Ecuador, where he obtained his BSc in biology from the Pontificia Universidad Católica del Ecuador (PUCE). He discovered his first species new to science, Pristimantis bambu, at age 17, and published a scientific description of it at age 19.

== Career ==
While still a student in 2009, Arteaga co-founded Tropical Herping, a tour agency offering nature photography trips and herpetological tours throughout the world's tropics. After serving as president of Tropical Herping until 2022, he founded Khamai Foundation in 2023, where he is its CEO. As of early 2026, Arteaga was the author of 31 research articles, primarily on systematics and biogeography of amphibians and reptiles. In 2023, in collaboration with former president of Ecuador Rosalía Arteaga, he created the world's first fund devoted exclusively towards the discovery of new species.

While Arteaga has become a prominent figure in South American herpetology, the author's rapid and unorthodox methodology in describing new species has invited debate with some curatorial circles The Arteaga Species Discovery Fund has named several species in honor of its funding patrons, including the actor Leonardo DiCaprio and the businessman and spiritual leader Shah Rahim al-Husseini (a.k.a. Aga Khan V), which some have criticized as potentially compromising scientific rigor in favor of attracting attention and donations. At about age 20 he left PUCE’s zoology museum after philosophical differences with the curator. In 2020, his Tropical Herping tour agency was criticised for its white background photography methods. He acknowledged some of the problems with the tour agency, before founding the Khamai Foundation in 2023. Some of his reported discoveries of new species were characterized as exhibiting "taxonomic inflation". While acknowledging some problems, Arteaga responded that some of his critics have had selfish motives, including wanting to stifle competition and take credit for his discoveries, and says that the need to discover species is too urgent to justify moving more slowly. In a less publicized manuscript, Arteaga puts forth the thesis that most of these criticisms are a direct consequence of the “Gollum Effect.” In taxonomic and curatorial circles, the Gollum effect describes the possessive and territorial behavior of researchers or curators who obstruct access to specimens or research topics to prevent others from publishing on them.

== Books ==
- Arteaga, Alejandro; Bustamante, Lucas M.; and Guayasamin, Juan M. The Amphibians and Reptiles of Mindo: Life in the Cloudforest (2013) Ecco Bella Beauty. ISBN 978-9942-13-496-7, a field guide with photographs of 48 species of Ecuador.
- Arteaga, Alejandro; Bustamante, Lucas M.; Vieira, Jose; Tapia, Washington; and Guayasamin, Juan M. Reptiles of the Galápagos (2019) Tropical Herping. ISBN 978-9942-36-547-7.
- Arteaga, Alejandro; Bustamante, Lucas; and Vieira, Jose. Reptiles of Ecuador (2024) Khamai Foundation & Tropical Herping. ISBN 978-9942-7249-0-8. DOI 10.47051/MNHT9360.

== See also ==
- Category:Taxa named by Alejandro Arteaga
