= List of anomalepidid species and subspecies =

This is a list of all genera, species and subspecies of the family Anomalepididae, otherwise referred to as primitive blind snakes, or anomalepidids. It follows the taxonomy currently provided by ITIS, which is based on the continuing work of Dr. Roy McDiarmid.

- Anomalepis
  - Anomalepis aspinosus
  - Anomalepis colombia
  - Anomalepis flavapices
  - Anomalepis mexicana
- Helminthophis
  - Helminthophis flavoterminatus
  - Helminthophis frontalis
  - Helminthophis praeocularis
- Liotyphlops
  - Liotyphlops albirostris
  - Liotyphlops anops
  - Liotyphlops argaleus
  - Liotyphlops beui
  - Liotyphlops schubarti
  - Liotyphlops ternetzii
  - Liotyphlops wilderi
- Typhlophis
  - Typhlophis squamosus
