= List of snakes of Trinidad and Tobago =

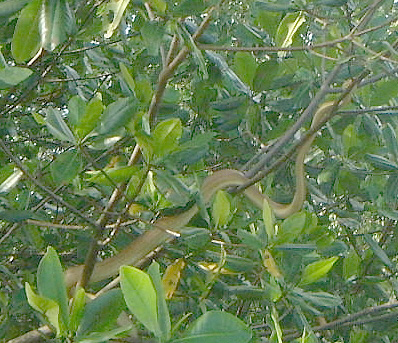
Cascabel dormillon or Cook's tree boa (Corallus ruschenbergerii), Caroni Swamp, Trinidad

Forty-seven species of snake have been recorded in Trinidad and Tobago, making the snake population of this area the most diverse in the Caribbean. Forty-four of these snake species are found in Trinidad and twenty-one in Tobago. Many of these species are South American, most of which are present in Venezuela. Trinidad and Tobago consists of two main islands, Trinidad and Tobago, and several smaller islands. The Bocas Islands, which lie between Trinidad and Venezuela, in the Bocas del Dragón (Dragon's Mouths), consist of Chacachacare, Monos, Huevos and Gaspar Grande. Several smaller islands lie off Trinidad, but snakes have been recorded on only one of them, Caledonia Island. Snakes have been recorded on one island off Tobago, Little Tobago. Four species are venomous: two coral snake species (Micrurus spp. (Note: The abbreviation "sp." indicates a single species and the abbreviation "spp." indicates multiple species.)), the fer-de-lance (Bothrops atrox) and the South American bushmaster (Lachesis muta). The common coral (Micrurus fulvius) is found on at least two of the Bocas Islands: Gaspar Grande and Monos. No venomous snakes inhabit Tobago.

== Anomalepididae ==
Anomalepididae is a family of nonvenomous snakes native to Central and South America. They are similar to Typhlopidae, except that some species possess a single tooth in the lower jaw. One possible species has been recorded in Trinidad and Tobago.

Anomalepididae
Species	Common name	Trinidad	Tobago	Bocas Is.	Other
Helminthophis cf. flavoterminatus (Note: Helminthophis sp. is known from a single collection. It may represent an undescribed species since none of the three described species are known from adjacent portions of Venezuela)	Yellow-headed ground puppy; Trinidadian dawn blind snake	Yes	No	No	No

== Leptotyphlopidae ==
Leptotyphlopidae is a family of snakes found in North and South America, Africa, and Asia. All are fossorial and adapted to burrowing, feeding on ants and termites. One species has been recorded in Trinidad and Tobago.

Leptotyphlopidae
Species	Common name	Trinidad	Tobago	Bocas Is.	Other
Epictia tenella	Ground puppy	Yes	No	No	No

== Typhlopidae ==
Typhlopidae is a family of blind snakes found mostly in the tropical regions of Africa, Asia and the Americas. Two species have been recorded in Trinidad and Tobago.

Typhlopidae
Species	Common name	Trinidad	Tobago	Bocas Is.	Other
Amerotyphlops brongersmianus	Brongersma's worm snake	Yes	No	No	No
Amerotyphlops trinitatus (Note: Typhlops trinitatus is endemic to Trinidad and Tobago.)	Trinidad burrowing snake	Yes	Yes	No	No

== Aniliidae ==
Aniliidae is a monotypic family created for the monotypic genus Anilius, which means that there is only one species in the entire family. This species is A. scytale, found in South America.

Aniliidae
Species	Common name	Trinidad	Tobago	Bocas Is.	Other
Anilus scytale scytale (Note: Anilus scytale scytale is only known in Trinidad and Tobago from a single collection.)	Burrowing false coral; rouleau	Yes	No	No	No

== Boidae ==
Boidae is a family of non-venomous snakes found in America, Africa, Europe, Asia and some Pacific Islands, containing the boas. Four species have been recorded in Trinidad and Tobago.

Boidae
Species	Common name	Trinidad	Tobago	Bocas Is.	Other
Boa constrictor constrictor	Macajuel, boa constrictor	Yes	Yes	Yes (Note: Boa constrictor constrictor has been recorded from the islands of Monos and Gaspar Grande.)	No
Corallus ruschenbergerii	Cascabel dormillon; Cook's tree boa	Yes	Yes	No	No
Epicrates cenchria maurus	Rainbow boa	Yes	Yes	Yes (Note: Epicrates cenchria maurus has been recorded from the island of Chacachacare, but the report has not been confirmed with a specimen.)	No
Eunectes murinus gigas	Green anaconda	Yes	No	No	No

== Family Colubridae ==
Colubridae is a family of snakes comprising about two thirds of all snake species on earth. Colubrid species are found on every continent, except Antarctica. Species from three subfamilies are found in Trinidad and Tobago.

=== Subfamily Xenodontinae ===
Xenodontinae is a subfamily of snakes within the family Colubridae that includes mud snakes and New World hognose snakes.

Xenodontinae
Species	Common name	Trinidad	Tobago	Bocas Is.	Other
Liophis cobellus cobellus	Mangrove snake, mangrove mapepire	Yes	No	No	No
Liophis melanotus nesos (Note: Liophis melanotus nesos has been recorded from the island of Chacachacare and is only known in Trinidad and Tobago from a single collection.)	Beh belle chemin, doctor snake	Yes	Yes	Yes	No
Liophis reginae zweifeli	High woods coral	Yes	Yes	No	No
Oxyrhopus petola petola	False coral	Yes	Yes	No	No
Pseudoboa neuwiedii	Ratonel	Yes	Yes	Yes (Note: Pseudoboa neuwiedii has been recorded from the island of Chacachacare.)	No
Siphlophis cervinus	Checkerbelly	Yes	No	No	No
Siphlophis compressus	Mapepire de fe, false coral	Yes	No	No	No
Thamnodynastes ramonriveroi	Striped swamp snake	Yes	No	No	No

=== Subfamily Dipsadinae ===
Dipsadinae is a subfamily of snakes within the family Colubridae that includes cat-eyed snakes, night snakes, and black-striped snakes.

Dipsadinae
Species	Common name	Trinidad	Tobago	Bocas Is.	Other
Atractus fuliginosus	Hallowell's ground snake	No	Yes	No	No
Atractus trilineatus	Three-lined ground snake	Yes	Yes	? (Note: Atractus trilineatus has been reported from the island of Huevos, but Boos (2001) considered this record to be doubtful.)	No
Atractus cf. univittatus (Note: Atractus cf. univittatus is known from a single collection in Tobago. It has affinities with A. univittatus, but may be an undescribed species.)	Tobago one-lined snake	No	Yes	No	No
Clelia clelia clelia	Black cribo, mussurana	Yes	No	Yes (Note: Clelia clelia clelia has been recorded from the island of Chacachacare, but the report has not been confirmed with a specimen.)	No
Dipsas variegata trinitatis (Note: Dipsas variegata trinitatis is only known in Trinidad and Tobago from a single collection.)	Snail-eating snake	Yes	No	No	No
Erythrolamprus aesculapii (Note: Erythrolamprus aesculapii is only known in Trinidad and Tobago from a single collection.)	False coral	Yes	No	No	No
Erythrolamprus bizona (Note: Erythrolamprus bizona is only known in Trinidad and Tobago from a single collection.)	False coral	Yes	No	No	No
Erythrolamprus cobella	Mangrove snake	Yes	No	No	No
Erythrolamprus melanotus	Black-backed snake	Yes	Yes	No	No
Erythrolamprus ocellatus (Note: Erythrolamprus ocellatus is only known in Trinidad and Tobago from a single collection.)	Tobago false coral, red snake	No	Yes	No	No
Erythrolamprus pseudoreginae	Tobago stream snake	No	Yes	No	No
Erythrolamprus zweifeli	Zweifel's ground snake	Yes	No	No	No
Helicops angulatus	Water mapepire, brown-banded water snake	Yes	No	No	No
Hydrops triangularis neglectus	Water coral	Yes	No	No	No
Imantodes cenchoa cenchoa	Mapepire corde violon, fiddle-string snake	Yes	Yes	No	No
Leptodeira annulata ashmeadi	False mapepire, cat-eyed night snake	Yes	Yes	Yes (Note: Leptodeira annulata ashmeadi has been recorded from the islands of Gaspar Grande and Huevos.)	No
Ninia atrata	Red-nape snake, ring neck snake	Yes	Yes	No	No
Ninia franciscoi	Trinidad coffeesnake	Yes	No	No	No
Sibon nebulata nebulata	Clouded snake	Yes	Yes	Yes (Note: Sibon nebulata nebulata has been recorded from the island of Huevos.)	No

=== Subfamily Colubrinae ===
Colubrinae is the largest subfamily of colubrids, and includes rat snakes, king snakes, milk snakes, vine snakes and indigo snakes.

Colubrinae
Species	Common name	Trinidad	Tobago	Bocas Is.	Other
Chironius carinatus carinatus	Machete savane, yellow machete	Yes	No	No	No
Chironius multiventris septentrionalis	Long-tailed machete savane	Yes	No	No	No
Chironius scurrulus (Note: Chironius scurrulus is only known in Trinidad and Tobago from a single collection.)	Smooth machete savane	Yes	No	No	No
Drymarchon corais corais	Yellow-tailed cribo	Yes	Yes	Yes (Note: Drymarchon corais corais has been recorded from the island of Monos.)	No
Leptophis ahaetulla coeruleodorus	Lora, parrot snake	Yes	Yes	No	No
Leptophis stimsoni (Note: Leptophis stimsoni is only known in Trinidad and Tobago from a single collection.)	Grey lora	Yes	No	No	No
Mastigodryas amarali	Amaral's tropical racer	Yes	Yes	No	No
Mastigodryas boddaerti boddaerti	Machete couesse	Yes	No	Yes (Note: Mastigodryas boddaerti boddaerti has been recorded from the islands of Monos, Gaspar Grande, Chacachacare, Huevos, and Caledonia.)	Yes
Mastigodryas boddaerti dunni (Note: Mastigodryas boddaerti dunni has been recorded from the island of Little Tobago and is only known in Trinidad and Tobago from a single collection.)	Machete couesse	No	Yes	No	Yes
Oxybelis rutherfordi	Horsewhip	Yes	Yes	Yes (Note: Oxybelis aeneus has been recorded from the islands of Chacachacare and Huevos.)	No
Phrynonax polylepis	Olivaceous bird snake, cutlah	Yes	No	No	No
Pseustes poecilonotus polylepis	Dos cocorite	Yes	No	No	No
Pseustes sulphureus sulphureus	Yellow-bellied puffing snake	Yes	No	No	No
Spilotes pullatus pullatus	Tigre, chicken snake	Yes	Yes	No	No
Tantilla melanocephala	Black-headed snake	Yes	Yes	Yes (Note: Tantilla melanocephala has been recorded from the island of Huevos.)	No

== Family Elapidae ==
Elapidae is a family of venomous snakes found in tropical and subtropical regions around the world, including the Indian Ocean and the Pacific. Two species are found in Trinidad and Tobago.

Elapidae
Species	Common name	Trinidad	Tobago	Bocas Is.	Other
Micrurus diutius	Trinidad ribbon coral snake	Yes	No	No	No
Micrurus circinalis	Large coral snake	Yes	No	Yes (Note: Micrurus circinalis has been recorded from the islands of Gaspar Grande (Boos 2001) and Monos (Charles & Smith 2009).)	No

== Family Viperidae ==
Viperidae is a family of venomous snakes found all over the world, except for Australia, New Zealand, Ireland, Madagascar, Hawaii and the Arctic Circle. All have relatively long hinged fangs that permit deep penetration and injection of venom. Two species are found in Trinidad and Tobago.

Species	Common name	Trinidad	Tobago	Bocas Is.	Other
Bothrops atrox	Mapepire balsain, fer-de-lance	Yes	No	No	No
Lachesis muta muta	Mapepire zanana, mapepire z'ananas, bushmaster	Yes	No	No	No

== See also ==
- Environment of Trinidad and Tobago
- List of birds of Trinidad and Tobago
- List of butterflies of Trinidad and Tobago
- List of reptiles of Trinidad and Tobago

== Bibliography ==
- Boos, Hans E.A. (2001). The snakes of Trinidad and Tobago. Texas A&M University Press, College Station, TX. ISBN 1-58544-116-3.
