= Machete Savane =

Machete Savane may refer to the following snake:

- Long-tailed Machete Savane or Chironius multiventris, a colubrid snake
- Smooth Machete Savane or Chironius scurrulus, a colubrid snake
- Chironius carinatus, also known as machete savane
- Leptodeira annulata, also known as machete savane
