= South American sipo =

There are two species of snake named South American sipo:

- Chironius foveatus
- Chironius septentrionalis
