= Central sipo =

There are two species of snake named central sipo:

- Chironius maculoventris
- Chironius quadricarinatus
