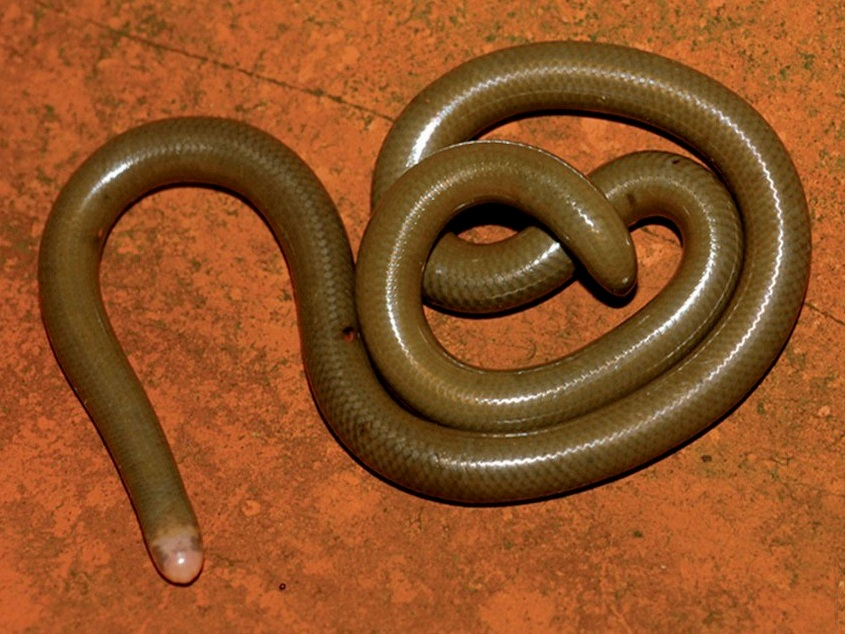

Conservation status
- Least Concern (IUCN 3.1)

Scientific classification
- Kingdom: Animalia
- Phylum: Chordata
- Class: Reptilia
- Order: Squamata
- Suborder: Serpentes
- Family: Anomalepididae
- Genus: Liotyphlops
- Species: L. ternetzii
- Subspecies: L. t. beui

Trinomial name
- Liotyphlops ternetzii beui (Amaral, 1924)

Synonyms
- Helminthophis beui Amaral, 1924; Liotyphlops beui — Dixon & Kofron, 1984

= Liotyphlops ternetzii beui =

Species of snake

Liotyphlops ternetzii beui is a species of nonvenomous snake in the family Anomalepididae. The species is native to northeastern Argentina, eastern Paraguay, and central-western, southeastern, and southern Brazil; the Reptile Database restricts its range to Brazil. It is locally common in Brazil. It is sometimes known as the pale-headed blindsnake.

== Etymology ==
The subspecific name, beui, is in honor of "T. Beu" who collected the type specimen.

== Geographic range ==
According to the IUCN, L. ternetzii beui is found in northeastern Argentina, eastern Paraguay, and in the Goiás, Mato Grosso, Minas Gerais, Paraná, and São Paulo states of Brazil. According to the Reptile Database, it is only found in the Brazilian states of Espírito Santo, Goiás, Minas Gerais, Paraná, Rio Grande do Sul, and São Paulo.

The type locality is Butantan, in São Paulo, Brazil.

== Habitat and behavior ==
L. ternetzii beui is a fossorial snake that is found in Cerrado savanna as well as in evergreen and semi-deciduous forests. Based on snakes brought to the Instituto Butantan (São Paulo), it is most active during the rainy season. Captive specimens are active on the surface of the ground mostly during early dark hours of night.

== Reproduction ==
L. ternetzii beui is oviparous.
