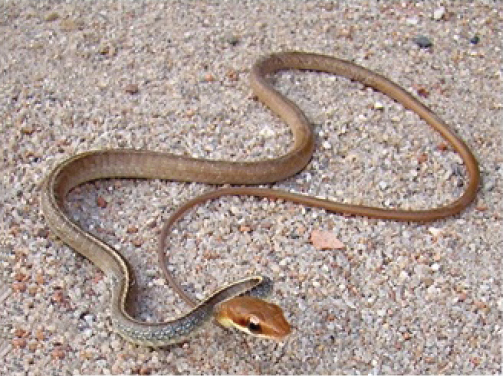

Conservation status
- Least Concern (IUCN 3.1)

Scientific classification
- Kingdom: Animalia
- Phylum: Chordata
- Class: Reptilia
- Order: Squamata
- Suborder: Serpentes
- Family: Colubridae
- Genus: Chironius
- Species: C. flavolineatus

Binomial name
- Chironius flavolineatus (Jan, 1863)
- Predominant distribution of Boettger's sipo

= Chironius flavolineatus =

Species of vine snake

Chironius flavolineatus, also known as Boettger's sipo, is a vine snake species in the family Colubridae, endemic to savannas and semiarboreal biomes in Brazil, and much of South America. It is listed as least concern on the IUCN Red List since 2014. It is a member of the Genus Chironius which is composed of twenty-two other described snake species. It is nonvenomous, using camouflage or burrowing as a form of defense.

== Description ==
The Chironius flavolineatus's distinguishing trait is a yellow or cream white vertebral stripe that extends for nearly the entire length of the snake's body. On either side of the stripe, black sides that begin after the first row of scales lie anteriorly. The back of the Chironius flavolineatus's head ranges in color from tan to brown and is distinct from the superior third of the body, which is black or dark gray. The Chironius flavolineatus usually has a single posterior temporalis muscle, a divided cloacal shield, and white, unpigmented ventral and subcaudal scales. Chironinus flavolineatus also features 0-4 rows of keeled dorsal scales in its midbody and a static color pattern throughout its lifetime

Studies indicate that Chironius flavolineatus is sexually dimorphic. Adult females tend to be larger than males, with an average weight around 81 g (2.9 oz) and an approximate total length of about 1.16 m (3 ft 10 in). Adult males weigh approximately 60 g (2.1 oz) and reach a total length of around 1.10 m (3 ft 7 in). Males tend to have long tails and larger eyes than their female counterparts, while no dimorphism is seen in the head size of the sexes. The smaller size of males indicates that there is limited male to male combat for mating. The differences in eye diameter, which has been observed in other members of the Chironius genus that live in the Atlantic Forests, is often linked to male-exclusive activities such as searching for females. Females members of the Chironius flavolineatus only begin to reproduce when their body is large enough to carry their eggs. This likely creates the selective pressure that leads to females being larger than males throughout the species. The thin body and long tails of the Chironius flavolineatus indicate that they have arboreal tendencies when in savanna environments. This speculation has been reinforced in natural studies, which show Chironius flavolineatus members foraging on the ground before resting at night in above-ground vegetation.

== Distribution & habitat ==
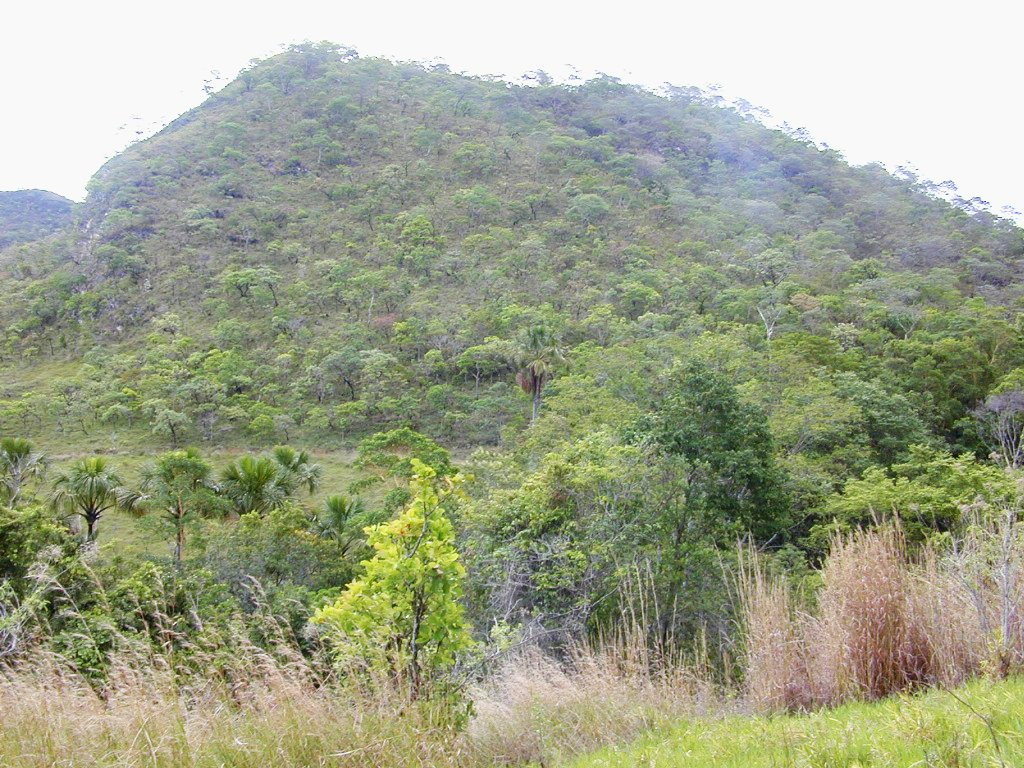
The Cerrado (Tropical Savanna)

Chironius flavolineatus has no specific locality and has been reported in São Paulo, Amazonas, Rio Grande do Sul, Pernambuco, Rio Grande do Norte and many other regions in South America. It is found predominantly in Brazil, but is also found in Paraguay, Bolivia and Peru. Chironius flavolineatus is commonly found in areas that are between 100 and 400 meters above sea level in biomes such as semiarboreal forests and grass steppes.

== Behavior and ecology ==
Chironius flavolineatus has various defense mechanisms that prevent itself from being killed or harmed by predators and utilizes camouflage. The main defensive behaviours that these snakes use are cryptic coloration, camouflage, and mimicry. For example, this species will submerge themselves in a pile of decaying foliage matter where it is not able to be detected until the threat or predator can no longer be observed. Chironius flavolineatus have been found to rest in said decaying matter roughly 2 meters above ground during nighttime, indicating a preference for arboreal resting spaces, contrasting its active ground-foraging behavior during the day.Another unique escape tactic the snake uses rarely is diving; there are several semi-aquatic snakes that regularly use the water as a defense however C. flavolineatus, an arboreal species normally would not. But when foraging near a river, it dived in as an attempt to escape.

=== Diet ===
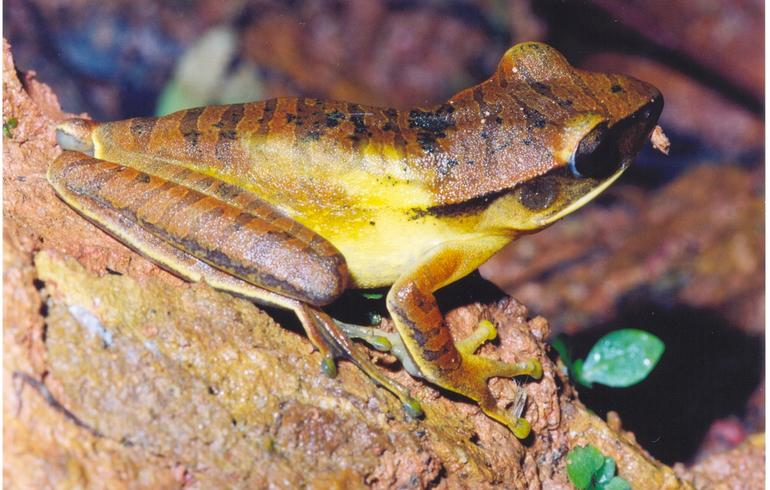
Hypsiboas albopunctatus (Common prey)

The diet of C. flavolineatus like other snakes in the Chironius genus consists fairly exclusively on frogs. The specific frog family preferred by these snakes is Hylidae which consists of a wide range of tree frogs. C. flavolineatus also have a taste for various small prey that they may find around their environment. These snakes are very active foragers as they roam the ground or arboreal substrates to acquire most of their diet. Likewise, their diet is also composed of nocturnal prey considering they are diurnal active foragers. Some examples of their prey include: hypsiboas albopunctatus, hypsiboas bishofi, scinax cf. fuscovarius, etc. When eating, these snakes will more often consume their prey by swallowing headfirst. After a meal, C. flavolineatus will use their surroundings vegetation to rest in while their slow metabolism digests their meal.

=== Reproduction ===
The Chironius flavolineatus males reach sexual maturity when they have enlarged testes and opaque deferens ductus (this is where its sperm is stored) and females reach maturity when they either have ovarian follicles and or oviduct eggs. Female snakes exhibit a seasonal reproductive cycle, during the months of a rainy season which is when vitellogenic follicles and oviduct eggs are most abundant for fertilization. C. flavolineatus eggs lay around 21 eggs and have an average diameter of 34.4 ± 6.4mm; with a range of 25.1–51.3 mm (0.99–2.02 in). Male snakes, however, have continuous sperm production (in the testes) and storage (in the deferens ductus). The females of C. flavolineatus are typically larger than males because of the strong preference males have for a large snout-vent length in females.

Courtship behavior was recorded in October during the rainy season, and data shows that mating in Chironius occurs at least in two periods of the year. As oviparous species, these snakes will develop eggs inside their bodies and will be laid in an entire clutch (N=21) at once. These eggs will need to be incubated at the proper temperature around 19 to 32 °C (66 to 90 °F) and humidity level for embryonic development before hatching. Once hatched, the snakes are called hatchlings or neonate snakes and will continue to grow to maturity.
