= Helminthophis frontalis =

Scientific classification
- Domain: Eukaryota
- Kingdom: Animalia
- Phylum: Chordata
- Class: Reptilia
- Order: Squamata
- Suborder: Serpentes
- Family: Anomalepididae
- Genus: Helminthophis
- Species: H. frontalis

Binomial name
- Helminthophis frontalis (Peters, 1860)

Species of snake

Helminthophis frontalis is a species of nonvenomous snake in the family Anomalepididae. It is endemic to Costa Rica and Panama.
