= Chironius diamantina =

Scientific classification
- Kingdom: Animalia
- Phylum: Chordata
- Class: Reptilia
- Order: Squamata
- Suborder: Serpentes
- Family: Colubridae
- Genus: Chironius
- Species: C. diamantina

Binomial name
- Chironius diamantina Fernandes & Hamdan, 2014

Species of snake

Chironius diamantina is a species of snake in the family Colubridae. The species is endemic to Brazil, in the state of Bahia.
