= Anomalepis mexicana =

Scientific classification
- Kingdom: Animalia
- Phylum: Chordata
- Class: Reptilia
- Order: Squamata
- Suborder: Serpentes
- Family: Anomalepididae
- Genus: Anomalepis
- Species: A. mexicana

Binomial name
- Anomalepis mexicana Jan, 1860

Species of snake

Anomalepis mexicana is a species of snake in the Anomalepididae family.

== Geographic range ==
It is endemic to Nicaragua, Costa Rica, Panama, and Peru.

== Description ==
Rounded snout, moderately prominent; nostrils lateral; rostral rather small; prefrontals and frontal subequal, the former forming a median suture; supraoculars well developed; eye distinguishable under the ocular; two superposed preoculars, the lower in contact with the labials; two small suboculars; two upper labials. Total length 32 times diameter of body; tail rounded, broader than long. 22 scales around body; a pair of enlarged preanals. Reddish brown, lighter ventrally, scales with a yellowish-white border. 130 mm (inches) in total length.
