= Liotyphlops argaleus =

Conservation status
- Data Deficient (IUCN 3.1)

Scientific classification
- Kingdom: Animalia
- Phylum: Chordata
- Order: Squamata
- Suborder: Serpentes
- Family: Anomalepididae
- Genus: Liotyphlops
- Species: L. argaleus

Binomial name
- Liotyphlops argaleus Dixon & Kofron, 1984

Species of snake

Liotyphlops argaleus is a species of snakes in the family Anomalepididae. It is endemic to Colombia.
