= Chironius laevicollis =

Conservation status
- Least Concern (IUCN 3.1)

Scientific classification
- Kingdom: Animalia
- Phylum: Chordata
- Class: Reptilia
- Order: Squamata
- Suborder: Serpentes
- Family: Colubridae
- Genus: Chironius
- Species: C. laevicollis

Binomial name
- Chironius laevicollis Wied-Neuwied, 1824

Species of snake

Chironius laevicollis, the Brazilian sipo, is a species of colubrid snake from Brazil. This species is endemic to the Atlantic Forest along the country's southeast coast, and is common and widespread throughout its range.
