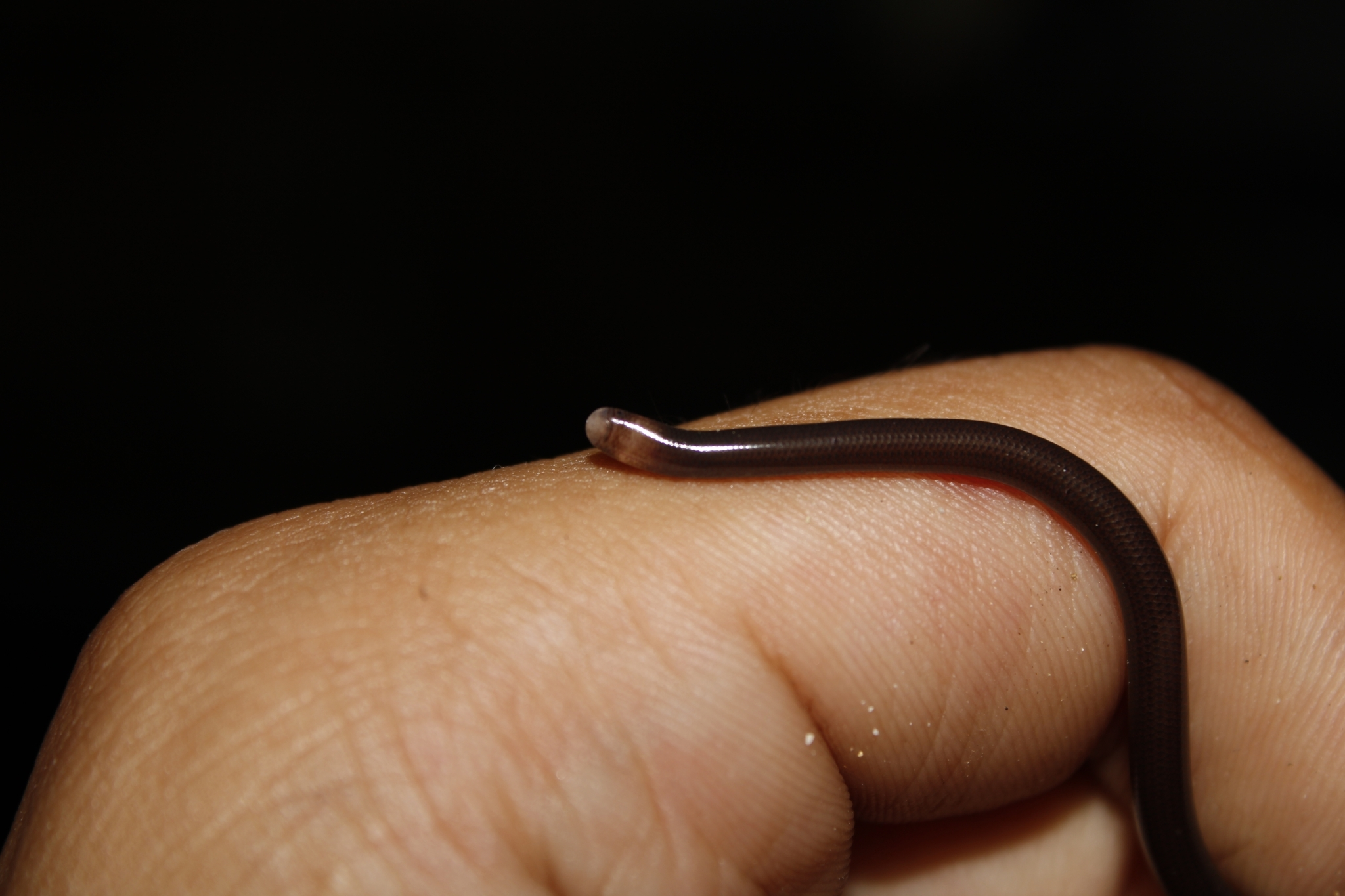

Scientific classification
- Kingdom: Animalia
- Phylum: Chordata
- Class: Reptilia
- Order: Squamata
- Suborder: Serpentes
- Family: Anomalepididae
- Genus: Liotyphlops
- Species: L. albirostris

Binomial name
- Liotyphlops albirostris (Peters, 1857)

= Liotyphlops albirostris =

Species of snake

Liotyphlops albirostris (common name Whitenose blind snake) is a species of snake in the family Anomalepididae. It is endemic to Central America. The snake has been reported from Colombia, Curaçao, Panama and Venezuela.
