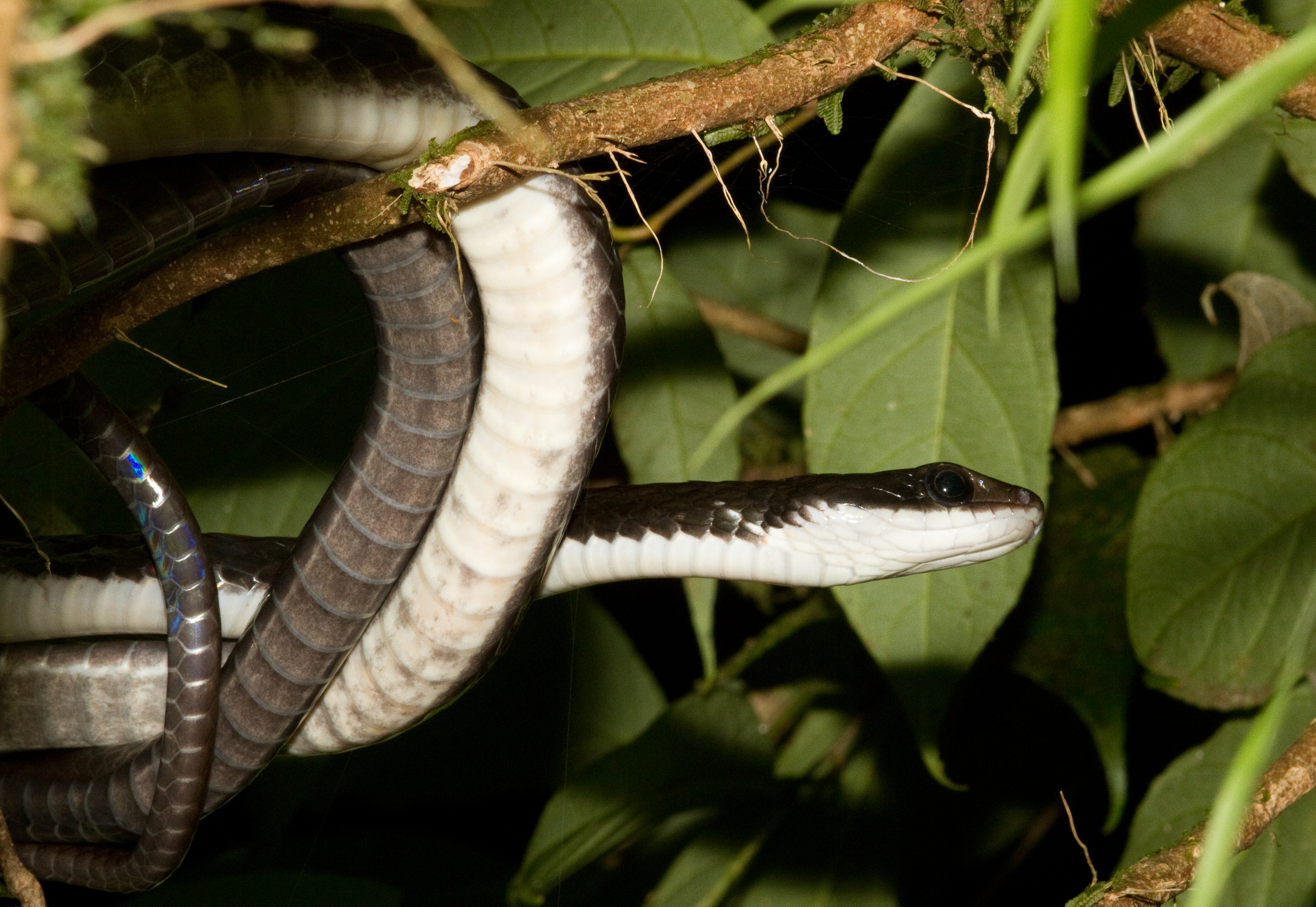

Conservation status
- Least Concern (IUCN 3.1)

Scientific classification
- Kingdom: Animalia
- Phylum: Chordata
- Class: Reptilia
- Order: Squamata
- Suborder: Serpentes
- Family: Colubridae
- Genus: Chironius
- Species: C. grandisquamis

Binomial name
- Chironius grandisquamis (Peters, 1869)

= Chironius grandisquamis =

Species of snake

Chironius grandisquamis, the Ecuador sipo, is a species of snake in the family Colubridae. The species is found in Honduras, El Salvador, Nicaragua, Costa Rica, Panama, Ecuador, Peru, Bolivia, and Colombia.
