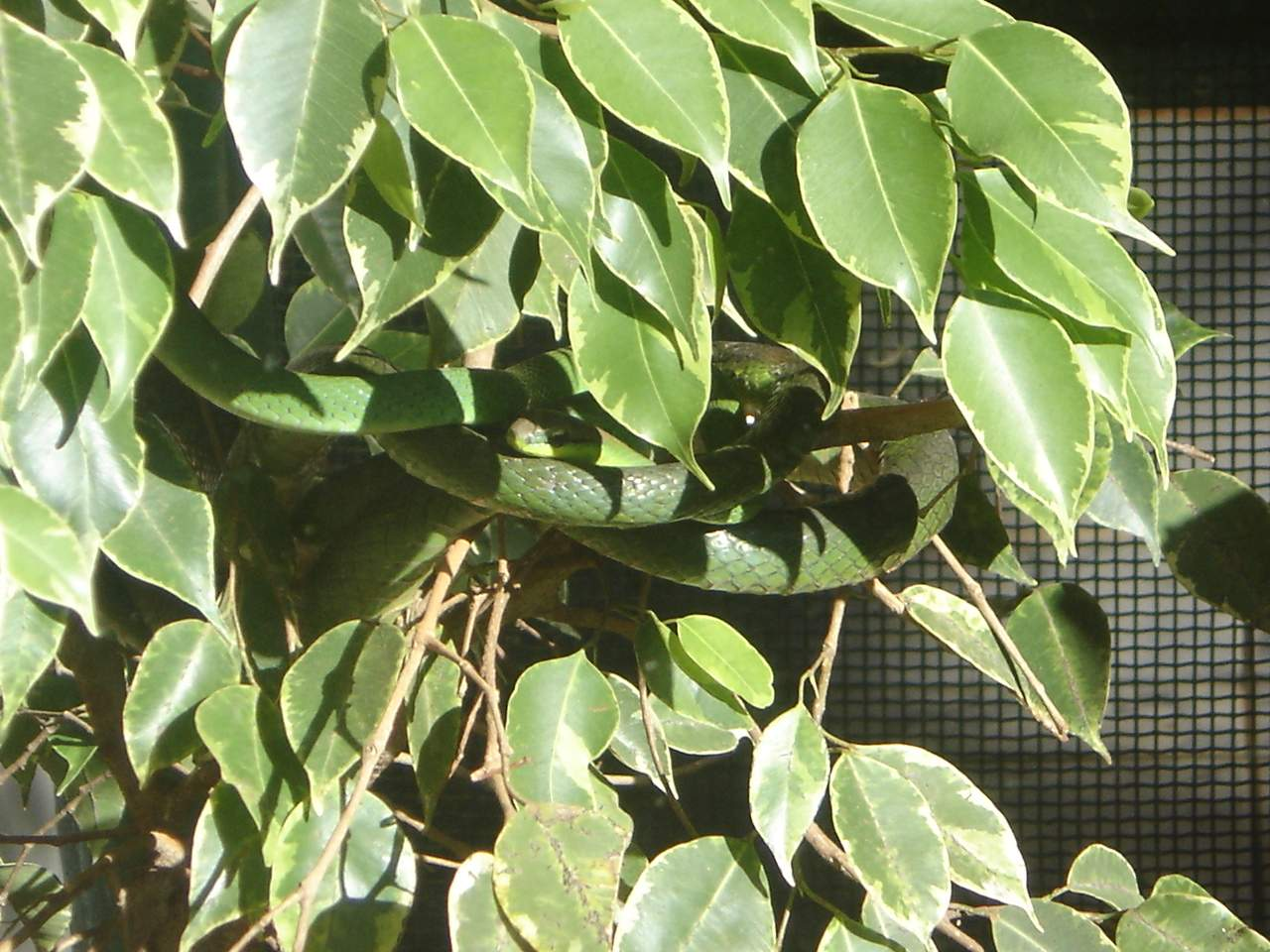

Conservation status
- Least Concern (IUCN 3.1)

Scientific classification
- Kingdom: Animalia
- Phylum: Chordata
- Class: Reptilia
- Order: Squamata
- Suborder: Serpentes
- Family: Colubridae
- Genus: Chironius
- Species: C. bicarinatus

Binomial name
- Chironius bicarinatus Wied-Neuwied, 1820

= Chironius bicarinatus =

Species of snake

Chironius bicarinatus, the two-headed sipo, is a species of snake in the family Colubridae. The species is found in Brazil, Argentina, Uruguay, and Paraguay.
