= Anomalepis flavapices =

Scientific classification
- Kingdom: Animalia
- Phylum: Chordata
- Class: Reptilia
- Order: Squamata
- Suborder: Serpentes
- Family: Anomalepididae
- Genus: Anomalepis
- Species: A. flavapices

Binomial name
- Anomalepis flavapices J.A. Peters, 1957

Species of snake

Anomalepis flavapices is a species of snake in the family Anomalepididae. The species is endemic to Ecuador.
