= Chironius leucometapus =

Conservation status
- Least Concern (IUCN 3.1)

Scientific classification
- Kingdom: Animalia
- Phylum: Chordata
- Class: Reptilia
- Order: Squamata
- Suborder: Serpentes
- Family: Colubridae
- Genus: Chironius
- Species: C. leucometapus

Binomial name
- Chironius leucometapus Dixon, Wiest & Cei, 1993

Species of snake

Chironius leucometapus, the yellow-headed sipo, is a species of nonvenomous snake in the family Colubridae. The species is found in Ecuador and Peru.
