= Chironius challenger =

Conservation status
- Least Concern (IUCN 3.1)

Scientific classification
- Kingdom: Animalia
- Phylum: Chordata
- Class: Reptilia
- Order: Squamata
- Suborder: Serpentes
- Family: Colubridae
- Genus: Chironius
- Species: C. challenger

Binomial name
- Chironius challenger Kok, 2010

Species of snake

Chironius challenger is a species of snake in the family Colubridae. The species is found in Guyana and Venezuela.
