= Liotyphlops schubarti =

Conservation status
- Data Deficient (IUCN 3.1)

Scientific classification
- Kingdom: Animalia
- Phylum: Chordata
- Class: Reptilia
- Order: Squamata
- Suborder: Serpentes
- Family: Anomalepididae
- Genus: Liotyphlops
- Species: L. schubarti

Binomial name
- Liotyphlops schubarti Vanzolini, 1948

Species of snake

Liotyphlops schubarti is a species of snake in the family Anomalepididae. The species is endemic to Brazil.

== Etymology ==
The specific name, schubarti, is in honor of German-born Brazilian zoologist Otto Schubart.

== Geographic range ==
L. schubarti is found in the Brazilian state of São Paulo.

== Habitat ==
The preferred natural habitat of L. schubarti is forest.

== Reproduction ==
L. schubarti is oviparous.
