= Chironius spixii =

Conservation status
- Least Concern (IUCN 3.1)

Scientific classification
- Kingdom: Animalia
- Phylum: Chordata
- Class: Reptilia
- Order: Squamata
- Suborder: Serpentes
- Family: Colubridae
- Genus: Chironius
- Species: C. spixii

Binomial name
- Chironius spixii (Hallowell, 1845)

Synonyms
- Coluber spixii Hallowell, 1845; Coluber pickeringii Hallowell, 1845; Chironius carinatus spixii (Hallowell, 1845)

Species of snake

Chironius spixii is a species of nonvenomous snake in the subfamily Colubrinae of the family Colubridae. The species is native to northwestern South America.

== Etymology ==
The specific name, spixii, is in honor of German biologist Johann Baptist von Spix.

== Description ==
C. spixii may attain a total length (including tail) of 1.75 m (5.7 ft).

== Geographic range ==
C. spixii is found in Colombia and Venezuela.

== Habitat ==
The preferred natural habitat of C. spixii is forest or savanna at altitudes from near sea level to 800 m (2,600 ft), but it has also been found in plantations and pastures.

== Behavior ==
C. spixii is semi-arboreal.

== Diet ==
C. spixii preys predominately upon amphibians and lizards, but it may also eat small mammals.

== Reproduction ==
C. spixii is oviparous.
