= Anomalepis colombia =

Scientific classification
- Kingdom: Animalia
- Phylum: Chordata
- Class: Reptilia
- Order: Squamata
- Suborder: Serpentes
- Family: Anomalepididae
- Genus: Anomalepis
- Species: A. colombia

Binomial name
- Anomalepis colombia Marx, 1953

Species of snake

Anomalepis colombia is a species of snake in the family Anomalepididae. It is endemic to Colombia and only known from the holotype collected in Caldas.

Based on the reexamined holotype and two additional species, the Anomalepis colombia unique combination of 28-30/28-30/25-27 scales rows around the body, a rounded snout at the dorsal view, which moderately tapers in lateral view, has a total length of 170–193 mm (10 subcaudal scales, 4 supralabial and infralabial scales, 363-410 middorsal scales, and 357-402 midventral scales), uniform light brown color on dorsal, and creamish white color at ventral. This distinguishes Anomalepis colombia from the other species in the Anomalepis genus (A. mexicans, A. aspinous, and A. flavapices (Vanegas-Guerrero et al. 2019)).
