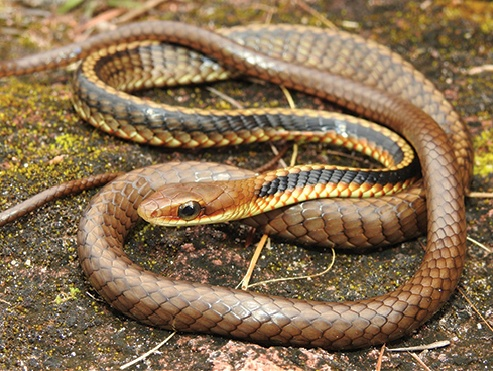

Scientific classification
- Kingdom: Animalia
- Phylum: Chordata
- Class: Reptilia
- Order: Squamata
- Suborder: Serpentes
- Family: Colubridae
- Genus: Chironius
- Species: C. brazili

Binomial name
- Chironius brazili Hamdan & Fernandes, 2015

= Chironius brazili =

Species of snake

Chironius brazili is a species of snake in the subfamily Colubrinae of the family Colubridae. The species is endemic to Brazil.

== Etymology ==
The specific name, brazili, is in honor of Brazilian herpetologist Vital Brazil.
