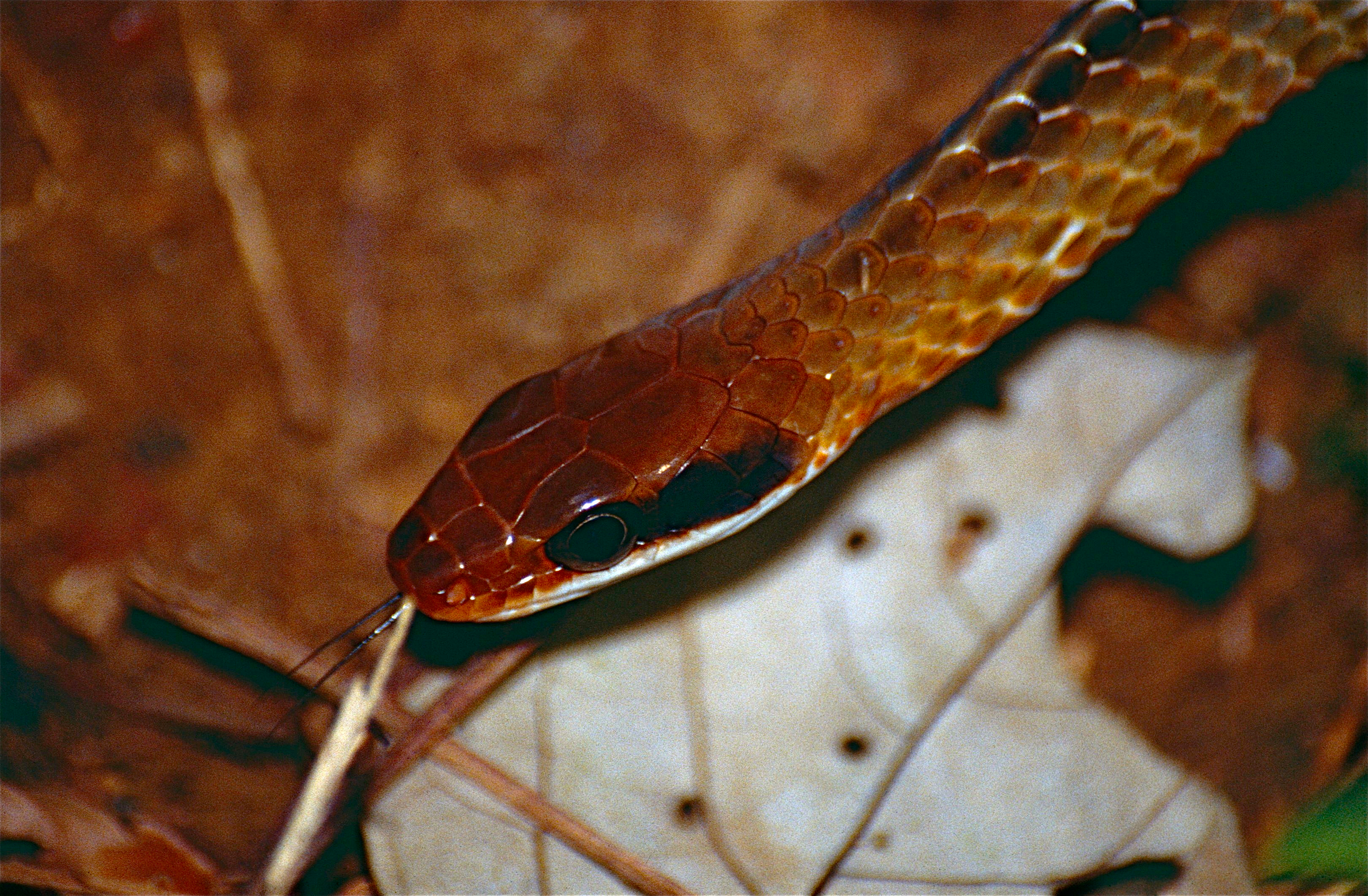

Conservation status
- Least Concern (IUCN 3.1)

Scientific classification
- Kingdom: Animalia
- Phylum: Chordata
- Class: Reptilia
- Order: Squamata
- Suborder: Serpentes
- Family: Colubridae
- Genus: Chironius
- Species: C. fuscus

Binomial name
- Chironius fuscus (Linnaeus, 1758)

= Brown sipo =

Species of snake

The brown sipo (Chironius fuscus) is a species of snake of the family Colubridae.

== Geographic range ==
The snake is found in South America and Central America.
