= Helminthophis praeocularis =

Scientific classification
- Kingdom: Animalia
- Phylum: Chordata
- Class: Reptilia
- Order: Squamata
- Suborder: Serpentes
- Family: Anomalepididae
- Genus: Helminthophis
- Species: H. praeocularis

Binomial name
- Helminthophis praeocularis Amaral, 1924

Species of snake

Helminthophis praeocularis is a species of snake in the Anomalepididae family. It is endemic to Colombia.
