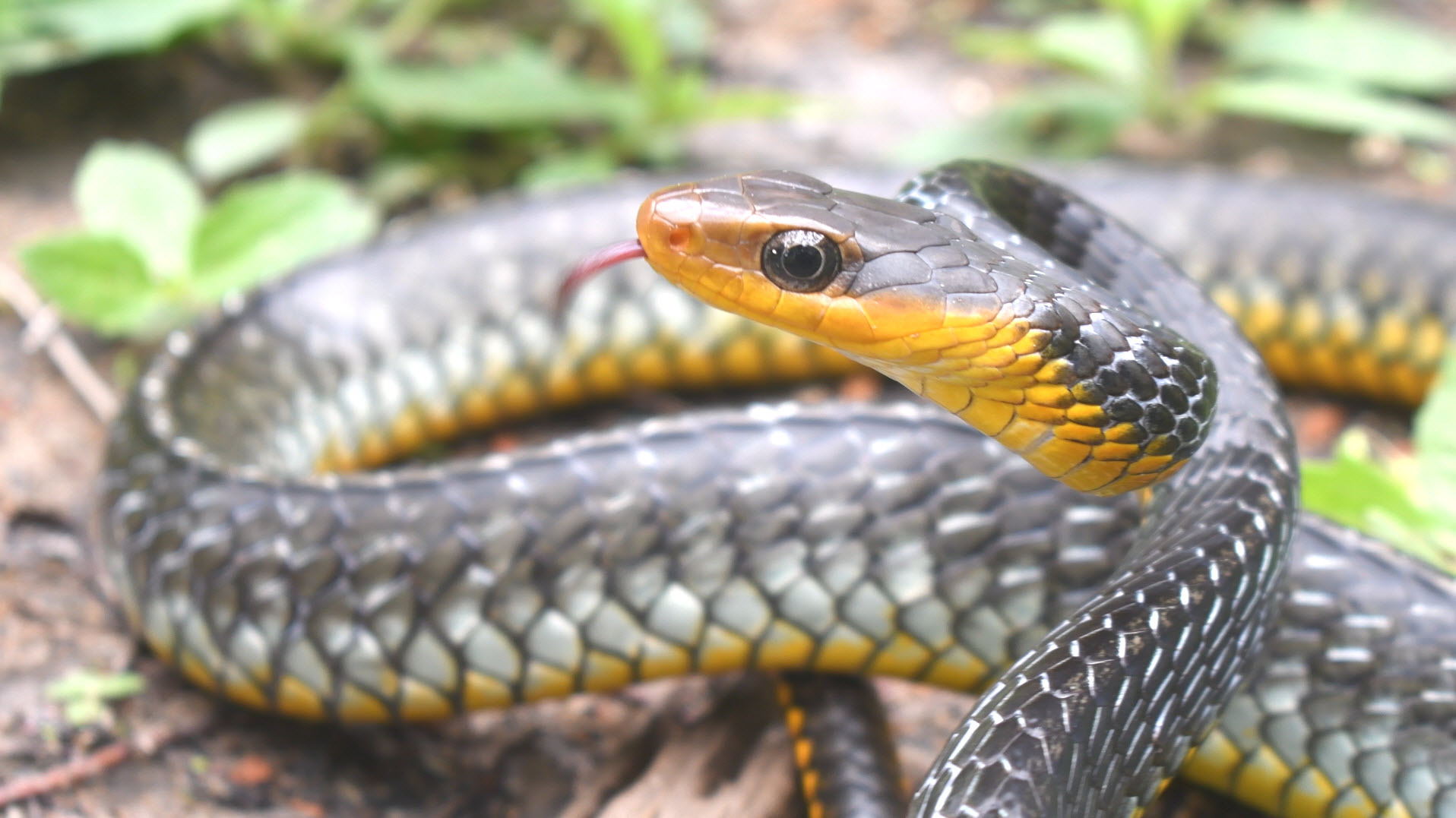
- Chironius carinatus
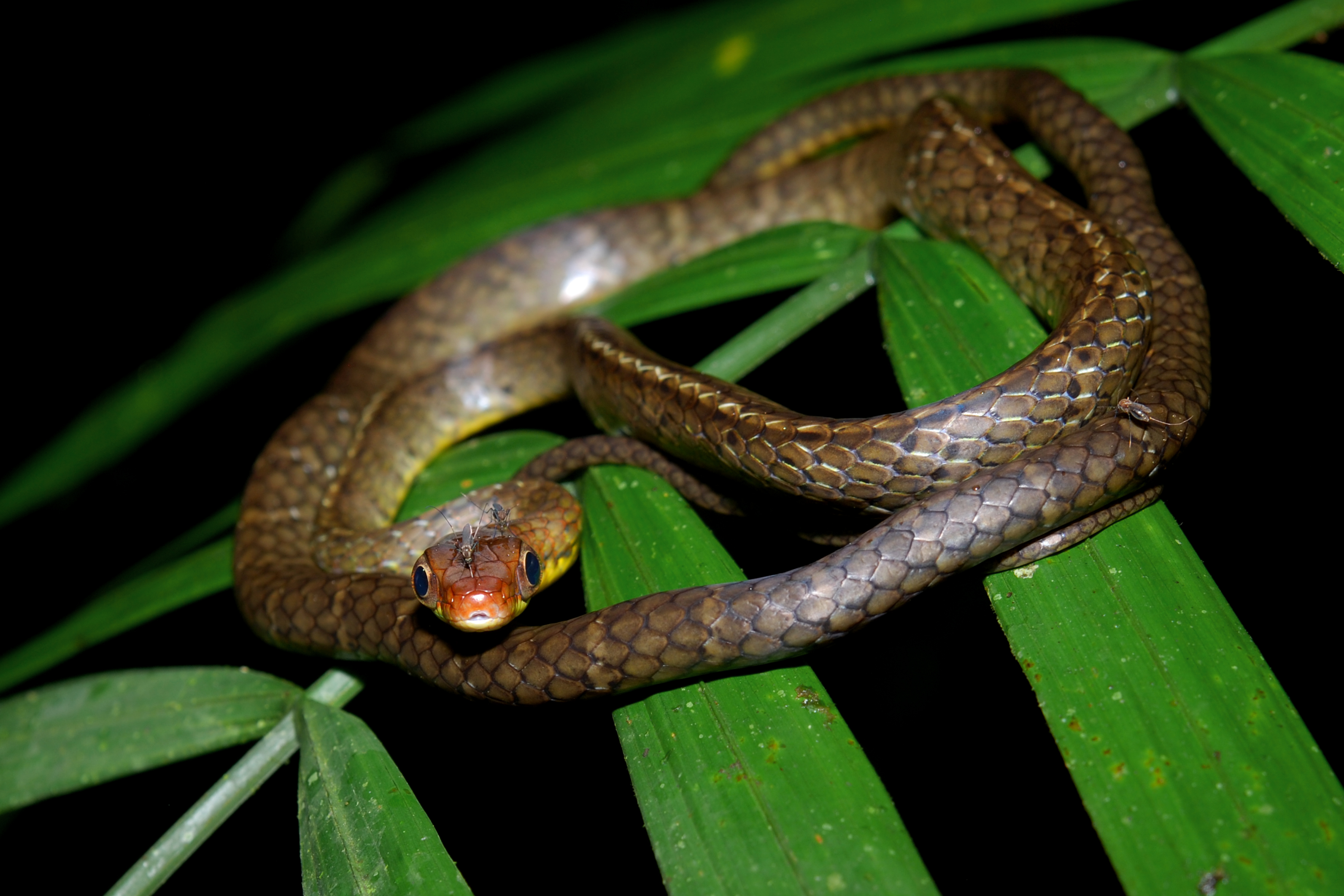
- Chironius scurrulus

Scientific classification
- Kingdom: Animalia
- Phylum: Chordata
- Class: Reptilia
- Order: Squamata
- Suborder: Serpentes
- Family: Colubridae
- Subfamily: Colubrinae
- Genus: Chironius; Fitzinger, 1826

Species
- 23, See text.

= Chironius =

Genus of snakes

Chironius is a genus of New World colubrid snakes, commonly called sipos (from the Portuguese word cipó for liana), savanes, or sometimes vine snakes. There are 23 described species in this genus.

== Species ==
The following 23 species are recognized as being valid.

- Chironius bicarinatus (Wied, 1820) – two-headed sipo
- Chironius brazili Hamdan & Fernandes, 2015
- Chironius carinatus (Linnaeus, 1758) – Amazon coachwhip
- Chironius challenger Kok, 2010
- Chironius diamantina Fernandes & Hamdan, 2014
- Chironius exoletus (Linnaeus, 1758) – Linnaeus's sipo
- Chironius flavolineatus (Boettger, 1885) – Boettger's sipo
- Chironius flavopictus (F. Werner, 1909)
- Chironius foveatus Bailey, 1955 – South American sipo
- Chironius fuscus (Linnaeus, 1758) – brown sipo
- Chironius gouveai Entiauspe-Neto, Lúcio-Lyra, Koch, Marques-Quintela, Diesel-Abegg & Loebmann, 2020 – Gouvea's sipo
- Chironius grandisquamis (W. Peters, 1869) – Ecuador sipo
- Chironius laevicollis (Wied, 1824) – Brazilian sipo
- Chironius laurenti Dixon, Wiest & Cei, 1993
- Chironius leucometapus Dixon, Wiest & Cei, 1993 – yellow-headed sipo
- Chironius maculoventris Dixon, Wiest & Cei, 1993 – central sipo
- Chironius monticola Roze, 1952 – mountain sipo
- Chironius multiventris Schmidt & Walker, 1943 – long-tailed machete savane
- Chironius quadricarinatus (F. Boie, 1827) – central sipo
- Chironius scurrulus (Wagler, 1824) – Wagler's sipo, smooth machete savane
- Chironius septentrionalis Dixon, Wiest & Cei, 1993 – South American sipo
- Chironius spixii (Hallowell, 1845)
- Chironius vincenti (Boulenger, 1891) – St. Vincent blacksnake

Nota bene: A binomial authority in parentheses indicates that the species was originally described in a genus other than Chironius.

== Conservation status ==
The St. Vincent Blacksnake, Chironius vincenti, is listed as critically endangered by the IUCN Red List due to its extremely limited range on the Island of St. Vincent.
