= Chironius gouveai =

Gouvea's sipo

Scientific classification
- Kingdom: Animalia
- Phylum: Chordata
- Class: Reptilia
- Order: Squamata
- Suborder: Serpentes
- Family: Colubridae
- Genus: Chironius
- Species: C. gouveai

Binomial name
- Chironius gouveai Entiauspe-Neto, Lúcio-Lyra, Koch, Marques-Quintela, Diesel-Abegg, & Loebmann, 2020

Species of snake

Chironius gouveai, Gouvea's sipo, is a species of snake in the family Colubridae. The species is endemic to Brazil, in the state of Rio Grande do Sul.
