= Liotyphlops anops =

Scientific classification
- Domain: Eukaryota
- Kingdom: Animalia
- Phylum: Chordata
- Class: Reptilia
- Order: Squamata
- Suborder: Serpentes
- Family: Anomalepididae
- Genus: Liotyphlops
- Species: L. anops

Binomial name
- Liotyphlops anops (Cope, 1899)

Species of snake

Liotyphlops anops is a species of snake in the family Anomalepididae. It is endemic to Colombia.
