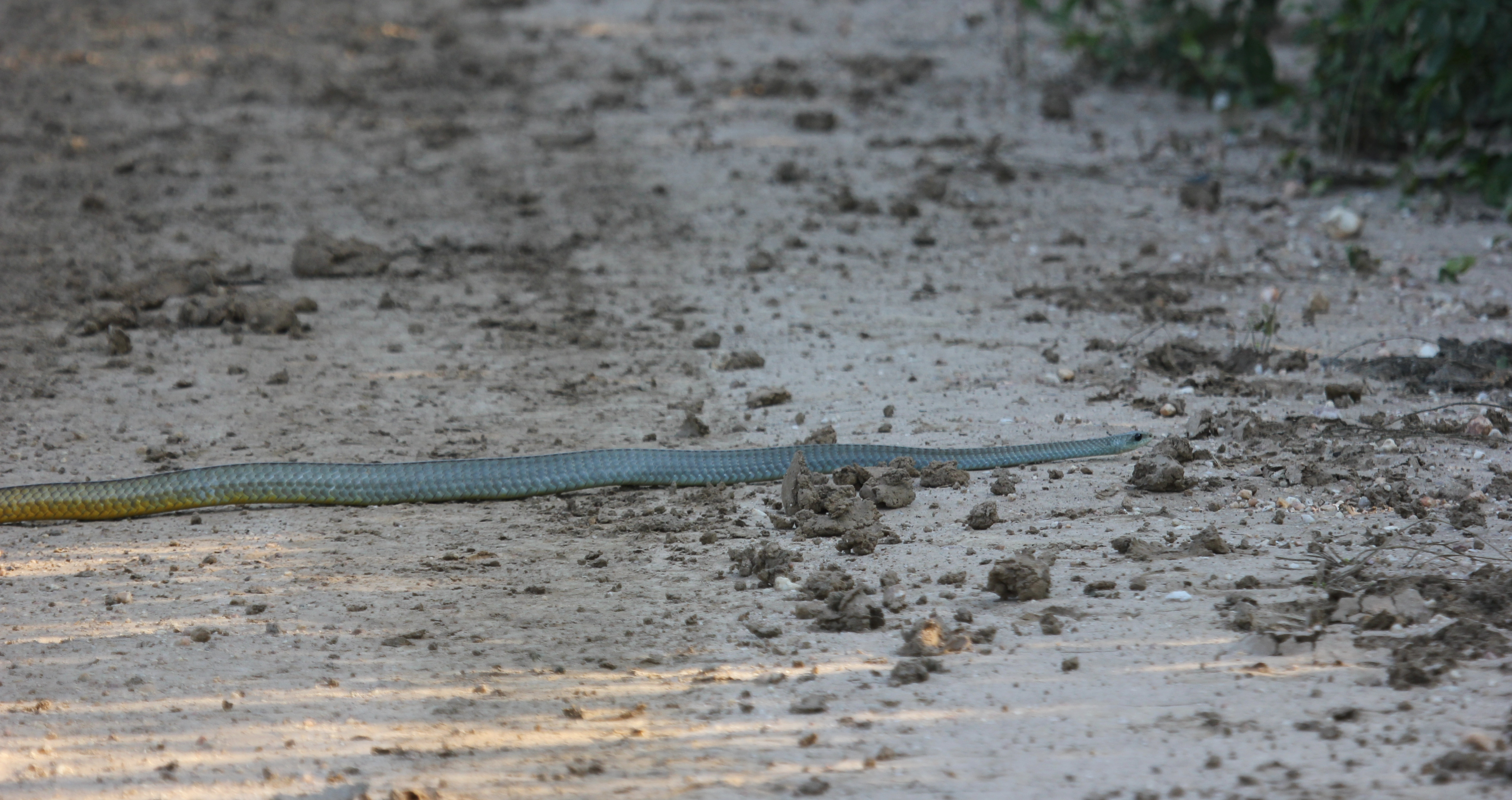
- Chironius laurenti in the Pantanal wetlands of Mato Grosso, Brazil

Conservation status
- Least Concern (IUCN 3.1)

Scientific classification
- Kingdom: Animalia
- Phylum: Chordata
- Class: Reptilia
- Order: Squamata
- Suborder: Serpentes
- Family: Colubridae
- Genus: Chironius
- Species: C. laurenti

Binomial name
- Chironius laurenti Dixon, Wiest & Cei, 1993

= Chironius laurenti =

Species of snake

Chironius laurenti is a species of nonvenomous snake in the family Colubridae. The species is native to Bolivia and Brazil. The species was named in honor of Raymond Laurent.

== Taxonomy ==
C. laurenti belongs to the genus Chironius (commonly known as sipos or savanes) in the subfamily Colubrinae of the family Colubridae. The species was first described in 1993 by the herpetologists James R. Dixon, John A. Wiest, Jr., and José M. Cei. The type specimens were recovered from the Mamoré River of Beni, Bolivia. The species is named after Belgian herpetologist Raymond Laurent.

== Description ==
C. laurenti is a large snake. The longest male and female found had a total length (including tail) of 2.15 and 1.78 m (7.1 and 5.8 ft) respectively. The head (top, sides, upper portion of the rostral scales and upper portions of the supralabial scales) of adults is olive, grayish or gray-brown in color. 32 to 36 maxillary teeth are present.

The upper (dorsal) coloration varies between grayish, gray-olive, brown-olive, brown and olive. The anterior end of the dorsum is usually grayish, whereas the posterior two thirds of body and tail are brownish. The subcaudal scales (scales below the tail) are immaculate yellow in color. There are 2 to 10 scale rows in males and 2 to 6 in females which are keeled, with a maximum of 12 scale rows at midbody. The ventral (belly) scales number from 163 to 181. A longitudinal ridge (keel) is present along the backs of females.

Subadults and some adults have faint whitish crossbands, which are remnants of the juvenile pattern, on the body and the tail.

== Geographic range ==
The known distribution of C. laurenti is restricted to Beni, Cochabamba and Santa Cruz in Bolivia and Mato Grosso in Brazil.
