= Chironius flavopictus =

Conservation status
- Data Deficient (IUCN 3.1)

Scientific classification
- Kingdom: Animalia
- Phylum: Chordata
- Class: Reptilia
- Order: Squamata
- Suborder: Serpentes
- Family: Colubridae
- Genus: Chironius
- Species: C. flavopictus

Binomial name
- Chironius flavopictus (Werner, 1909)

Species of snake

Chironius flavopictus is a species of snake in the family Colubridae. The species is found in Panama, Costa Rica, Colombia, and Ecuador.
