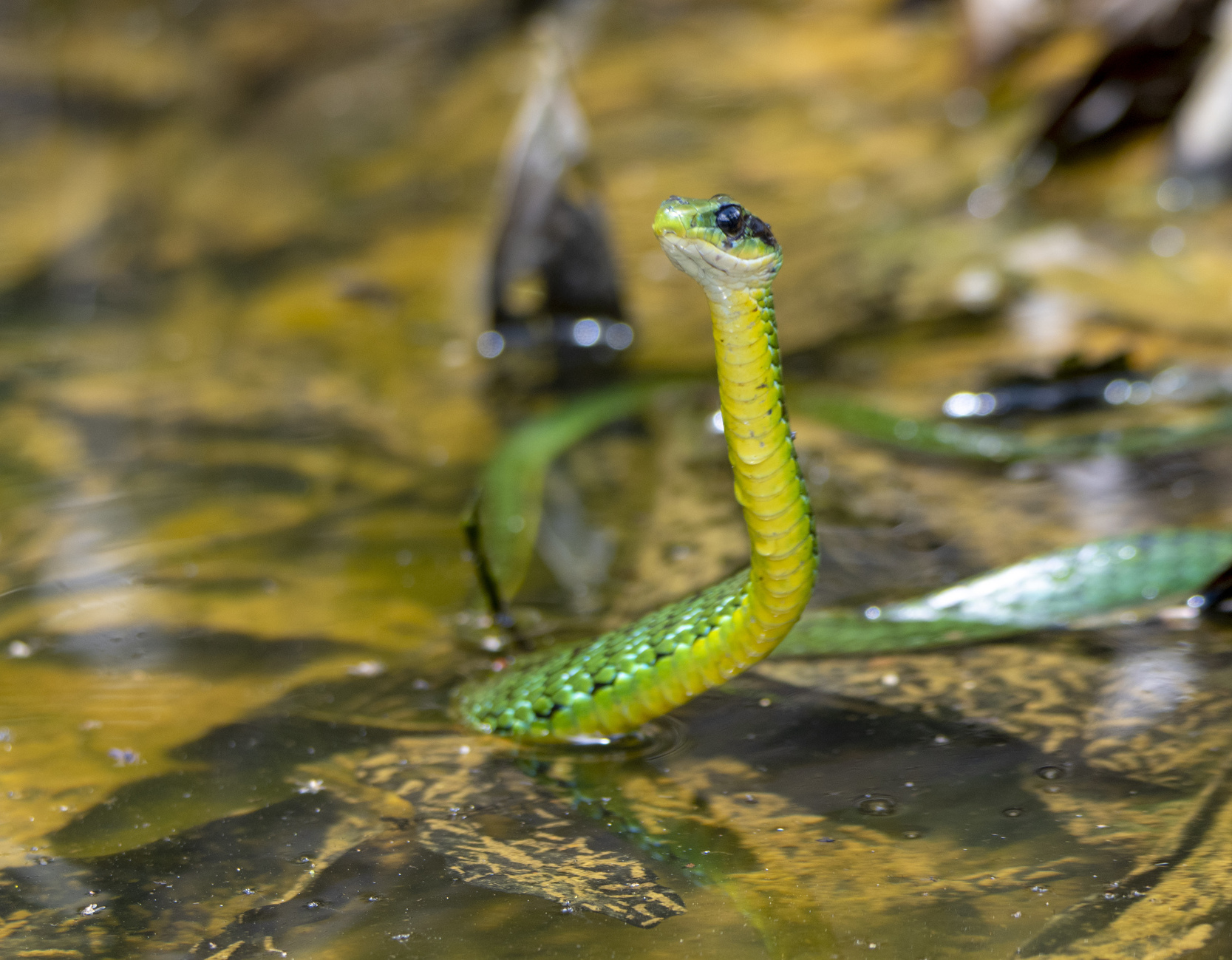

Conservation status
- Least Concern (IUCN 3.1)

Scientific classification
- Kingdom: Animalia
- Phylum: Chordata
- Class: Reptilia
- Order: Squamata
- Suborder: Serpentes
- Family: Colubridae
- Genus: Chironius
- Species: C. monticola

Binomial name
- Chironius monticola Roze, 1952

= Chironius monticola =

Species of snake

Chironius monticola, the mountain sipo, is a species of nonvenomous snake in the family Colubridae. The species is found in Venezuela, Ecuador, Bolivia, and Peru.
