= Anomalepis aspinosus =

Scientific classification
- Kingdom: Animalia
- Phylum: Chordata
- Class: Reptilia
- Order: Squamata
- Suborder: Serpentes
- Family: Anomalepididae
- Genus: Anomalepis
- Species: A. aspinosus

Binomial name
- Anomalepis aspinosus Taylor, 1939

Species of snake

The Taylor's Peru Blind Snake (Anomalepis aspinosus) is a species of snake in the Anomalepididae family. It is endemic to Peru, being seen once in history, in 1939 by Edward Harrison Taylor.
