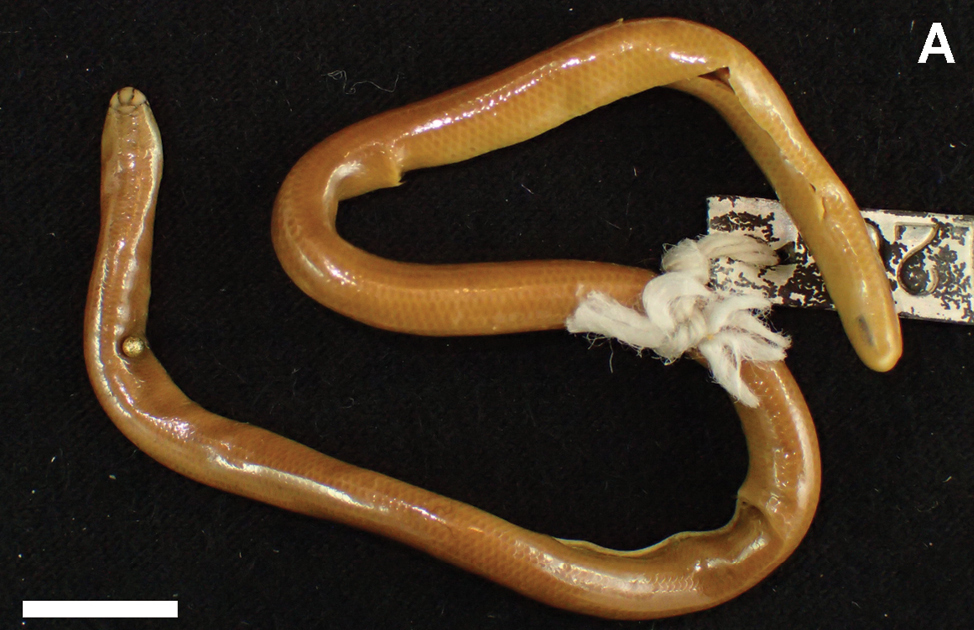
- syntype

Conservation status
- Least Concern (IUCN 3.1)

Scientific classification
- Kingdom: Animalia
- Phylum: Chordata
- Class: Reptilia
- Order: Squamata
- Suborder: Serpentes
- Family: Anomalepididae
- Genus: Liotyphlops
- Species: L. wilderi

Binomial name
- Liotyphlops wilderi (Garman, 1883)

Synonyms
- Typhlops wilderi Garman, 1883; Helminthophis guentheri Boulenger, 1889; Helminthophis wilderi Hammar, 1908; Liotyphlops wilderi Vanzolini, 1948

= Liotyphlops wilderi =

Species of snake

Liotyphlops wilderi, also known as Wilder's blind snake, is a species of snake in the family Anomalepididae. The species is endemic to Brazil.

== Etymology ==
The specific name, wilderi, is in honor of Burt Green Wilder, who was an American comparative anatomist and naturalist.

== Distribution and habitat ==
L. wilderi is found in southeastern Brazil, in the Brazilian states of Minas Gerais and Rio de Janeiro.

The preferred natural habitats of L. wilderi are forest and savanna.

== Reproduction ==
L. wilderi is oviparous.
