= Saint Vincent blacksnake =

Conservation status
- Critically Endangered (IUCN 3.1)

Scientific classification
- Kingdom: Animalia
- Phylum: Chordata
- Class: Reptilia
- Order: Squamata
- Suborder: Serpentes
- Family: Colubridae
- Genus: Chironius
- Species: C. vincenti

Binomial name
- Chironius vincenti (Boulenger, 1891)

Synonyms
- Herpetodryas carinatus var. vincenti Boulenger, 1891; Herpetodryas vincenti — Barbour, 1914; Chironius vincenti — Schwartz & Thomas, 1975

Species of snake

The Saint Vincent blacksnake (Chironius vincenti), also commonly known as the Saint Vincent coachwhip, the San Vincent racer, and Vincent's sipo, is a species of snake in the family Colubridae.

== Geographic range ==
C. vincenti is endemic to Saint Vincent, an island in the Caribbean Lesser Antilles that is part of Saint Vincent and the Grenadines.

== Etymology ==
The specific name, vincenti, refers to the island of Saint Vincent.

== Description ==
C. vincenti can grow to lengths in excess of a meter (40 inches). It is slate black, with a paler mouth and ventral surface.

== Habitat ==
The preferred natural habitat of C. vincenti is forest, at elevations of 275–600 m (902–1,969 ft).
