= Anomalepis =

Scientific classification
- Kingdom: Animalia
- Phylum: Chordata
- Class: Reptilia
- Order: Squamata
- Suborder: Serpentes
- Family: Anomalepididae
- Genus: Anomalepis; Jan, 1860

Synonyms
- Anomalepis - Jan In Jan & Sordelli, 1860; Anomalepis - Jan, 1861; Anomalloepis - Günther, 1885

Genus of snakes

Anomalepis is a genus of nonvenomous blind snakes found in Central and South America. Currently, 4 monotypic species are recognized.

== Geographic range ==
Found from southern Central America in Nicaragua, Costa Rica and Panama, to northwestern South America in Colombia, Ecuador and Peru.

== Species ==
Species	Taxon author	Common name	Geographic range
Anomalepis aspinosus	Taylor, 1939		Peru.
Anomalepis colombia	Marx, 1953		Colombia.
Anomalepis flavapices	Peters, 1957		Northwestern Ecuador.
Anomalepis mexicana^{T}	Jan, 1860		Nicaragua, Costa Rica, Panama, and Peru.

(^{T}) Type species.
