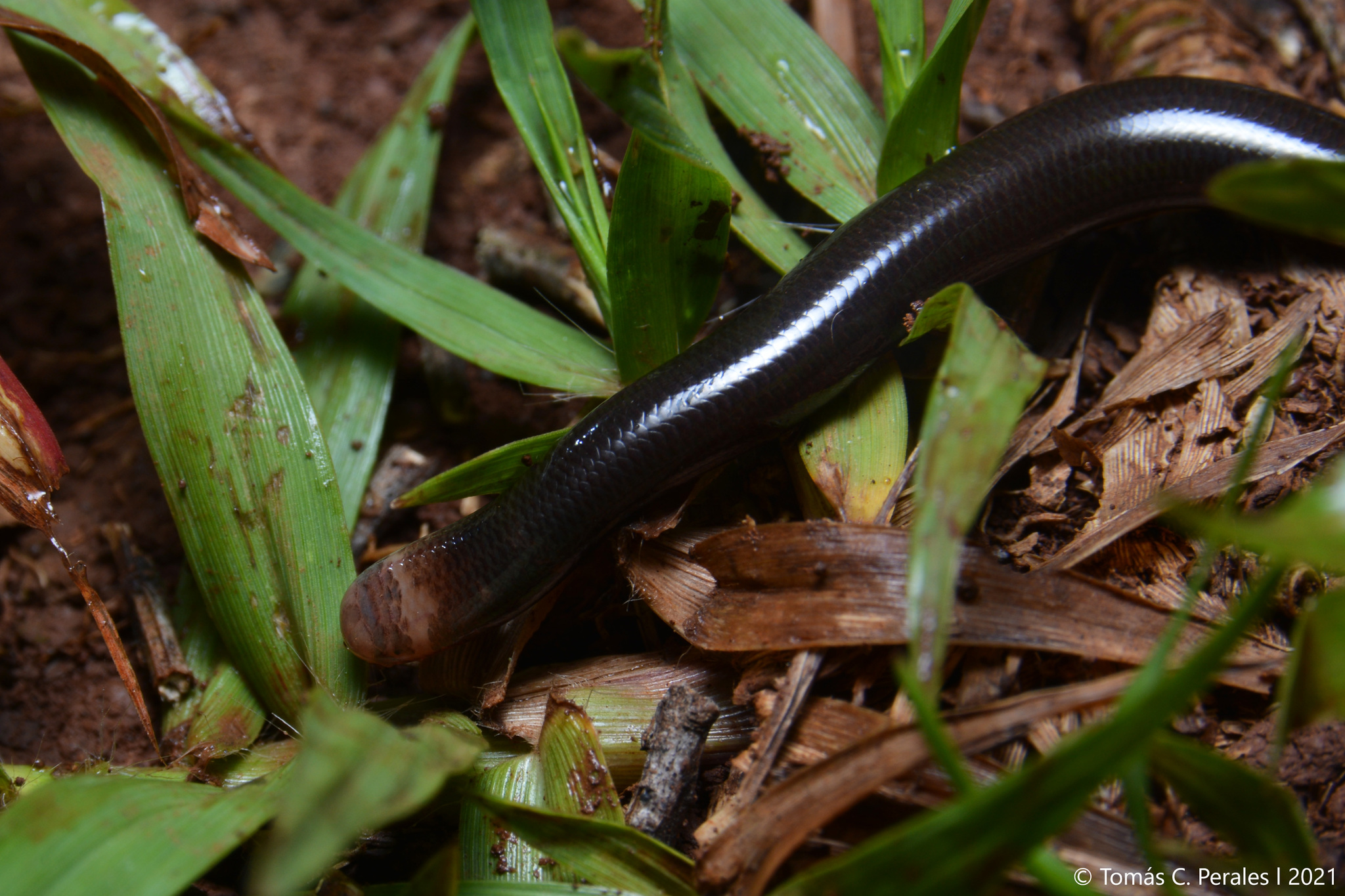

Conservation status
- Least Concern (IUCN 3.1)

Scientific classification
- Kingdom: Animalia
- Phylum: Chordata
- Class: Reptilia
- Order: Squamata
- Suborder: Serpentes
- Family: Anomalepididae
- Genus: Liotyphlops
- Species: L. ternetzii

Binomial name
- Liotyphlops ternetzii (Boulenger, 1896)

Synonyms
- Helminthophis ternetzii Boulenger, 1896; Helminthophis incertus Amaral, 1924; Helminthophis beui Amaral, 1924; Helminthophis collenettei Parker, 1928; Liotyphlops incertus – Vanzolini, 1948; Liotyphlops ternetzi [sic] – H.M. Smith & Grant, 1958; Liotyphlops ternetzii — J. Peters & Orejas-Miranda, 1970; Liotyphlops ternetzii – Dixon & Kofron, 1983

= Liotyphlops ternetzii =

Species of snake

Liotyphlops ternetzii, also known commonly as Ternetz's blind snake, is a species of snake in the family Anomalepididae. The species is endemic to South America.

== Etymology ==
The specific name, ternetzii, is in honor of ichthyologist Carl Ternetz (born 1870).

== Geographic range ==
L. ternetzii is found in northern Argentina, Paraguay, Uruguay, and Brazil. The record from Suriname (as Liotyphlops incertus) is questionable.

== Habitat and ecology ==
The natural habitats of L. ternetzii are grassland, savanna, and gallery forest, at altitudes of 200–1,000 m (660–3,280 ft). It is a fossorial species that preys predominantly upon insects, particularly ants and termites.

== Description ==
L. ternetzii measure 88–413 mm (3.5–16.3 in) in total length (including tail).

== Reproduction ==
L. ternetzii is oviparous. An adult female may lay a clutch of 2–7 eggs.
