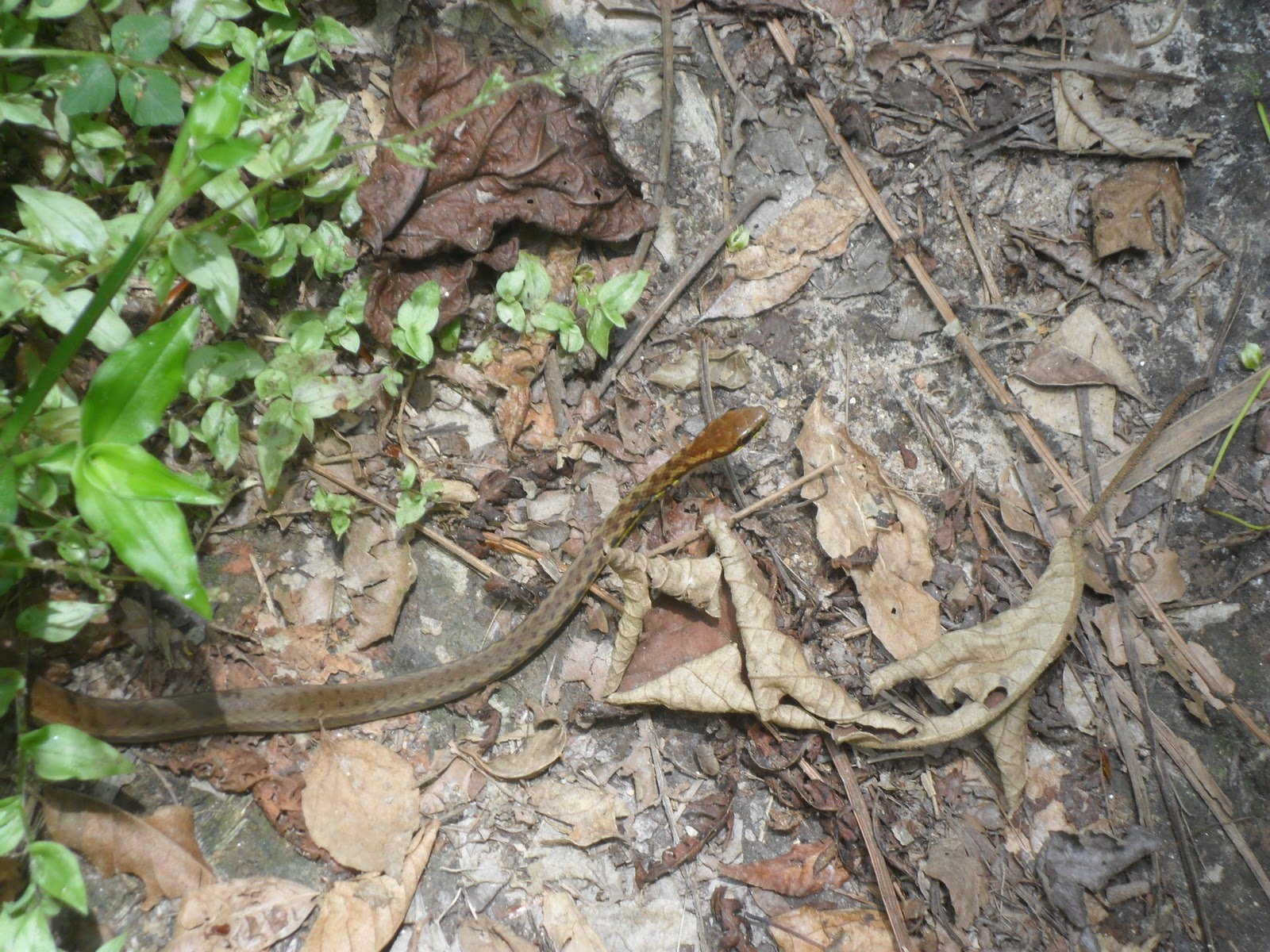

Conservation status
- Least Concern (IUCN 3.1)

Scientific classification
- Kingdom: Animalia
- Phylum: Chordata
- Class: Reptilia
- Order: Squamata
- Suborder: Serpentes
- Family: Colubridae
- Genus: Chironius
- Species: C. quadricarinatus

Binomial name
- Chironius quadricarinatus (Boie, 1827)

= Chironius quadricarinatus =

Species of snake

Chironius quadricarinatus, the central sipo, is a species of nonvenomous snake in the family Colubridae. The species is found in Brazil, Paraguay, and Bolivia.
