= Environment of Trinidad and Tobago =

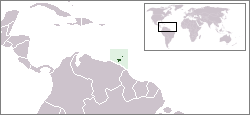
Trinidad and Tobago is in the Lesser Antilles.

The environment of Trinidad and Tobago reflects the interaction between its biotic diversity, high population density, and industrialised economy.

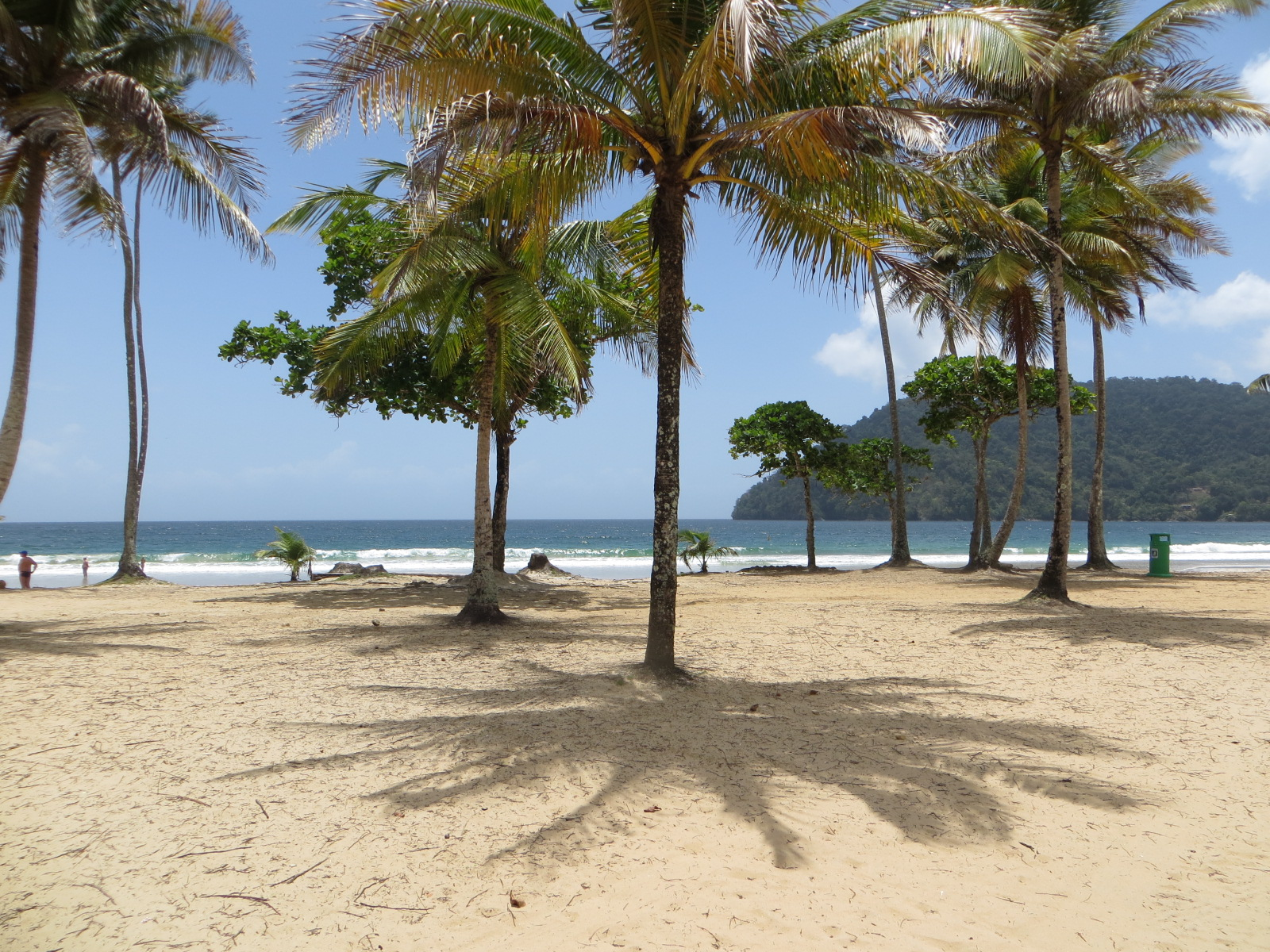
Beach area of Port of Spain, Trinidad

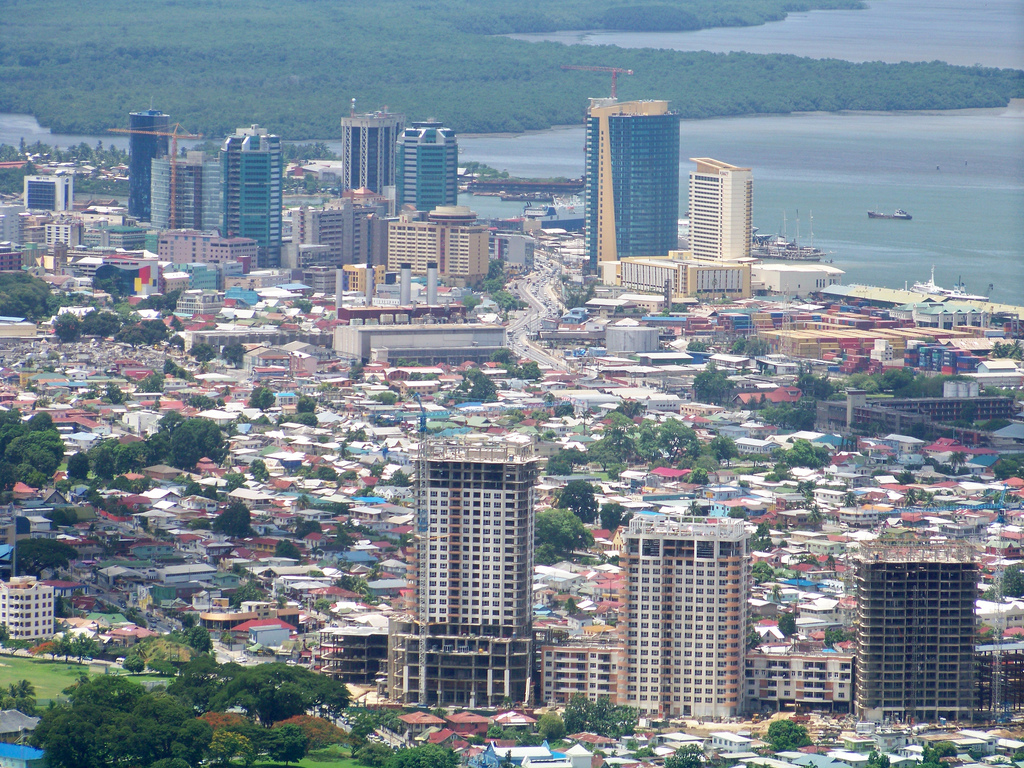
Port of Spain urban area

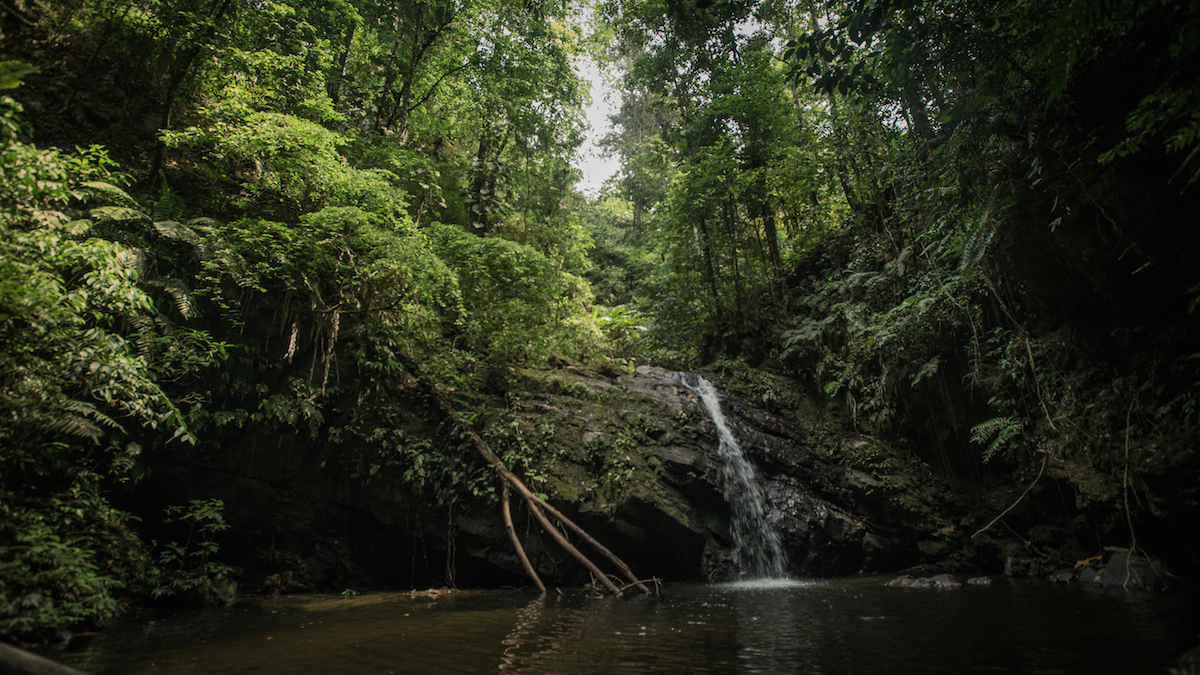
Grande Riviere, in a moist forest region

== Environment of Trinidad and Tobago ==
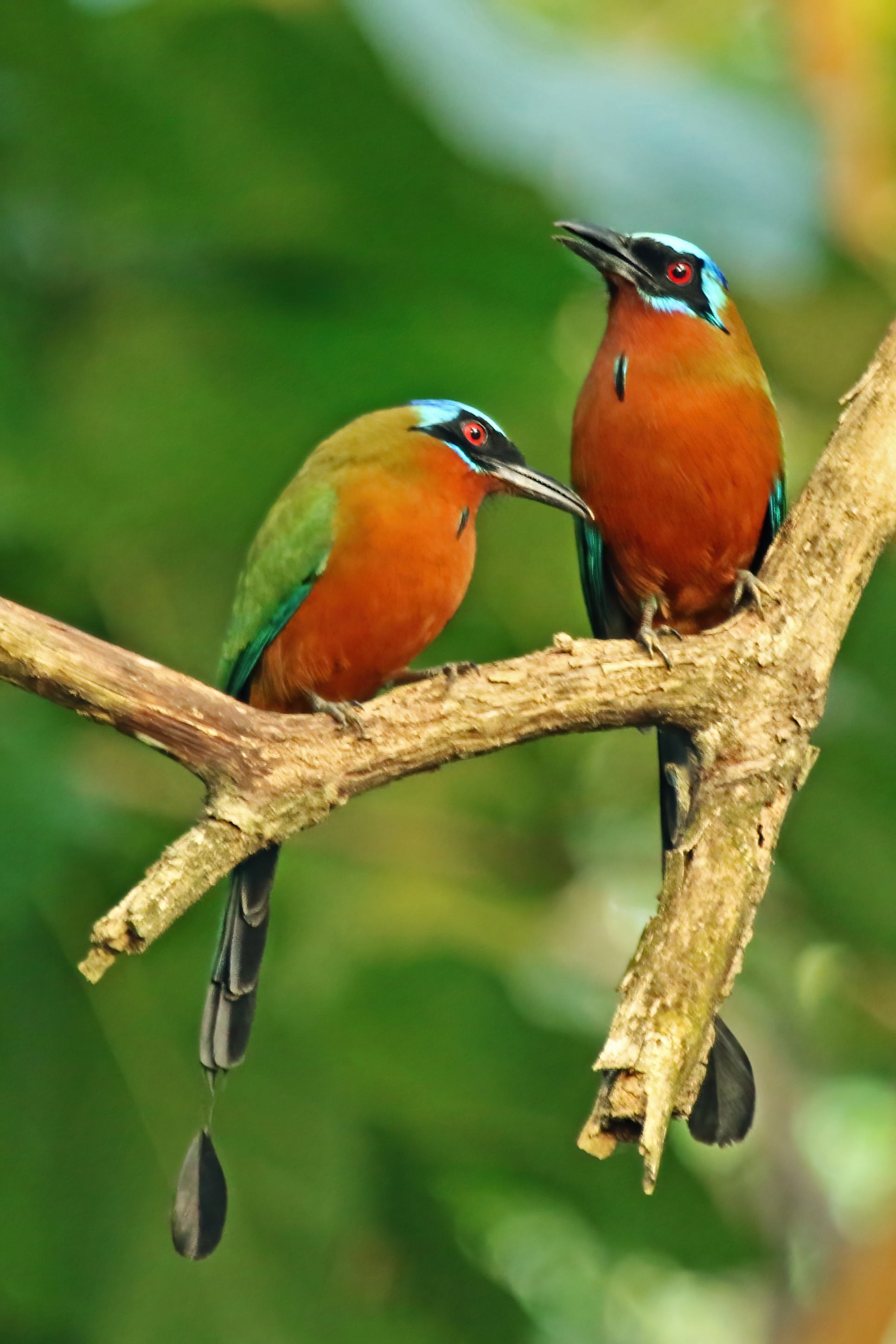
Trinidad Motmots

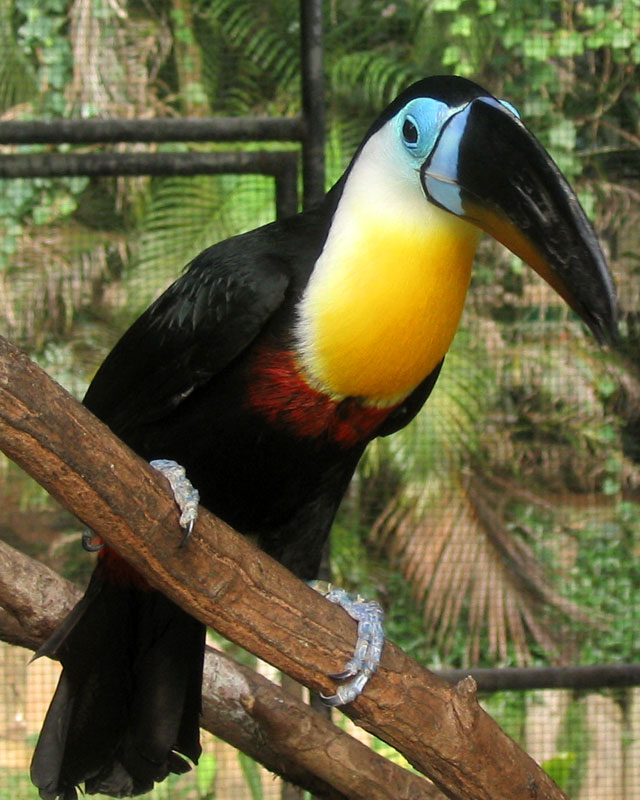
Channel-billed toucan, Trinidad

=== Biota/Fauna ===
The flora of Trinidad and Tobago is believed to include about 2,500 species of vascular plants. There are about 50 species of freshwater fish (plus 30 marine species which are occasionally found in freshwater) 400–500 marine fish species, 30 amphibian species, about 90 reptiles, 469 species of birds, and 98 mammal species.

== Environmental policy and law ==
Trinidad and Tobago is a signatory to a number of treaties and international agreements:

Biodiversity, Climate Change, Kyoto Protocol, Endangered species, Hazardous waste, Law of the sea, Comprehensive Nuclear-Test-Ban Treaty, Montreal Protocol, International Tropical Timber Agreements, Wetlands

== Environmental issues ==
Environmental issues are water pollution from agricultural chemicals, industrial wastes, and raw sewage; oil pollution of beaches; deforestation; soil erosion.

Trinidad and Tobago had a 2018 Forest Landscape Integrity Index mean score of 6.62/10, ranking it 69th globally out of 172 countries.

== See also ==
- List of environmental issues
