= Helminthophis flavoterminatus =

Scientific classification
- Domain: Eukaryota
- Kingdom: Animalia
- Phylum: Chordata
- Class: Reptilia
- Order: Squamata
- Suborder: Serpentes
- Family: Anomalepididae
- Genus: Helminthophis
- Species: H. flavoterminatus

Binomial name
- Helminthophis flavoterminatus (Peters, 1857)

Species of snake

Helminthophis flavoterminatus is a species of snake in the Anomalepididae family. It is endemic to Colombia and Venezuela.
