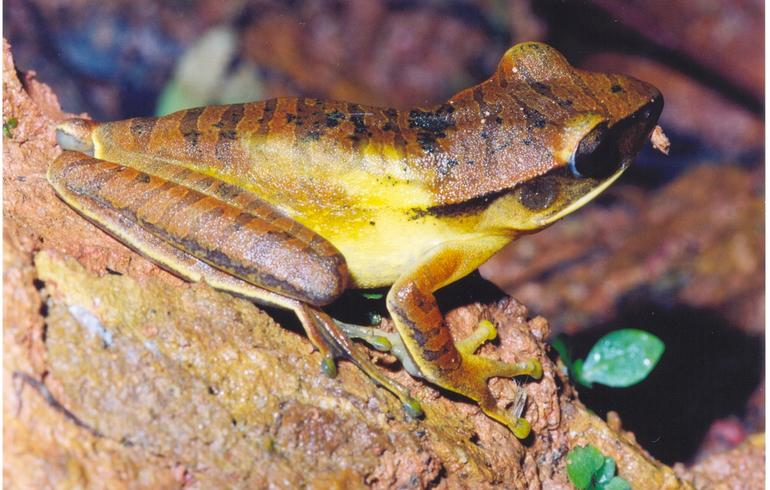

Conservation status
- Least Concern (IUCN 3.1)

Scientific classification
- Domain: Eukaryota
- Kingdom: Animalia
- Phylum: Chordata
- Class: Amphibia
- Order: Anura
- Family: Hylidae
- Genus: Boana
- Species: B. albopunctata

Binomial name
- Boana albopunctata (Spix, 1824)

Synonyms
- Hypsiboas albopunctatus (Spix, 1824)

= White-spotted tree frog =

Species of amphibian

The white-spotted tree frog (Boana albopunctata) is a species of frog in the family Hylidae found in Argentina, Bolivia, Brazil, Paraguay, and Uruguay. Its natural habitats are moist savanna, subtropical or tropical moist shrubland, subtropical or tropical high-altitude shrubland, intermittent rivers, intermittent freshwater lakes, freshwater marshes, intermittent freshwater marshes, and urban areas.
