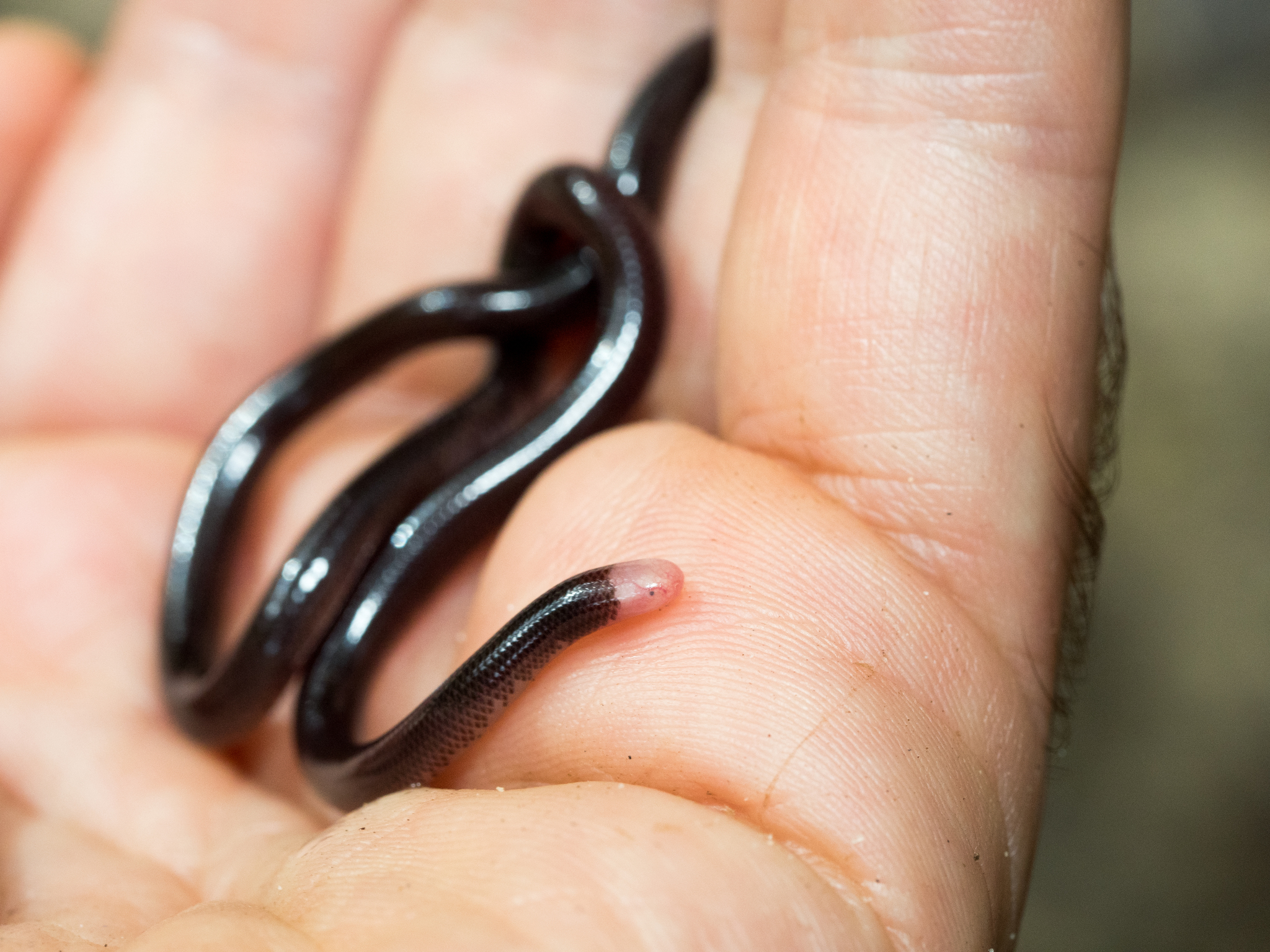

Scientific classification
- Domain: Eukaryota
- Kingdom: Animalia
- Phylum: Chordata
- Class: Reptilia
- Order: Squamata
- Suborder: Serpentes
- Family: Anomalepididae
- Genus: Typhlophis; Fitzinger, 1843
- Species: T. squamosus

Binomial name
- Typhlophis squamosus (Schlegel, 1839)

Synonyms
- Typhlophis Fitzinger, 1843; Cephalolepis A.M.C. Duméril & Bibron, 1844; Typhlops squamosus Schlegel, 1839; Cephalolepis leucocephalus A.M.C. Duméril & Bibron, 1844; Typhlops squammosus [sic] A.M.C. Duméril & Bibron, 1844 (ex errore); Anilios (?) squamosus — Gray, 1845; Cephalolepis squamosus — Jan & Sordelli, 1860; Typhlophis squamosus — Boulenger, 1893; Typhlophis ayarzaguenai Señaris, 1998; Typhlophis squamosus McDiarmid, Campbell & Touré, 1999

= Typhlophis =

Genus of snakes

Common names: (none).

Typhlophis is a monotypic genus created for the blind snake species, Typhlophis squamosus, found along the Atlantic coast of South America from the Guianas to Pará in Brazil, as well as in Trinidad. No subspecies are currently recognized.

== Geographic range ==
Typhlophis squamosus is found in the Atlantic coastal lowlands of South America in Guyana, Suriname and French Guiana as far south as the state of Pará in Brazil. It is also found on the island of Trinidad. The type locality given is "Cayenne" (French Guiana).

== Description ==
The head of T. squamosus is covered with small scales, which are indistinguishable from the body scales.

== Etymology ==
The synonym, Typhlophis ayarzaguenai, was named in honor of Venezuelan herpetologist José Ayarzagüena.
