= Chironius maculoventris =

Conservation status
- Least Concern (IUCN 3.1)

Scientific classification
- Kingdom: Animalia
- Phylum: Chordata
- Class: Reptilia
- Order: Squamata
- Suborder: Serpentes
- Family: Colubridae
- Genus: Chironius
- Species: C. maculoventris

Binomial name
- Chironius maculoventris Dixon, Wiest & Cei, 1993

Species of snake

Chironius maculoventris, the central sipo, is a species of nonvenomous snake in the family Colubridae. The species is found in Argentina, Paraguay, Bolivia, and Brazil.
