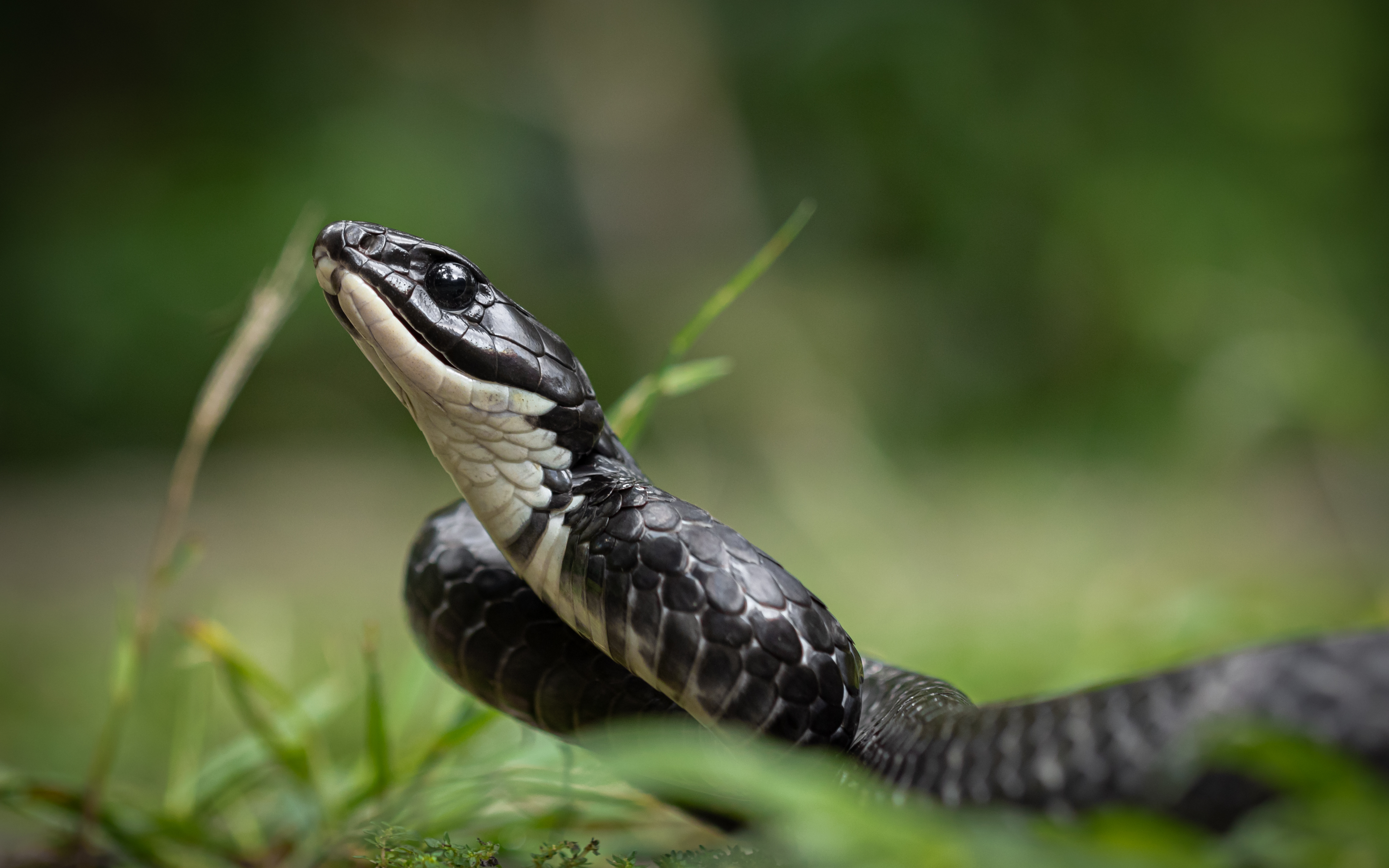

Conservation status
- Least Concern (IUCN 3.1)

Scientific classification
- Kingdom: Animalia
- Phylum: Chordata
- Class: Reptilia
- Order: Squamata
- Suborder: Serpentes
- Family: Colubridae
- Genus: Chironius
- Species: C. foveatus

Binomial name
- Chironius foveatus Bailey, 1955

= Chironius foveatus =

Species of snake

Chironius foveatus, the South American or coastal sipo, is a semi-arboreal (Harrington et al. 2018) species of non-venomous snake in the family Colubridae, found in Brazil. It primarily inhabits the southern and eastern coastal regions of the country, such as the states of Bahia, Santa Catarina, Espírito Santo and Rio de Janeiro, as well as the municipalities of Rio Fortuna and Ilhéus. It has also been observed on Ilha Grande.

Local Portuguese names include cipó, cobra-cipó, cobra-cipó verde, cobra verde, caninana, caninana-verde-de-cabeça-preta, cobra-espada and serra-velha (English: 'vine', 'vine-snake', 'green vine-snake', 'green snake', 'cane', 'black-headed green cane', 'sword-snake' and 'mountain-man').
