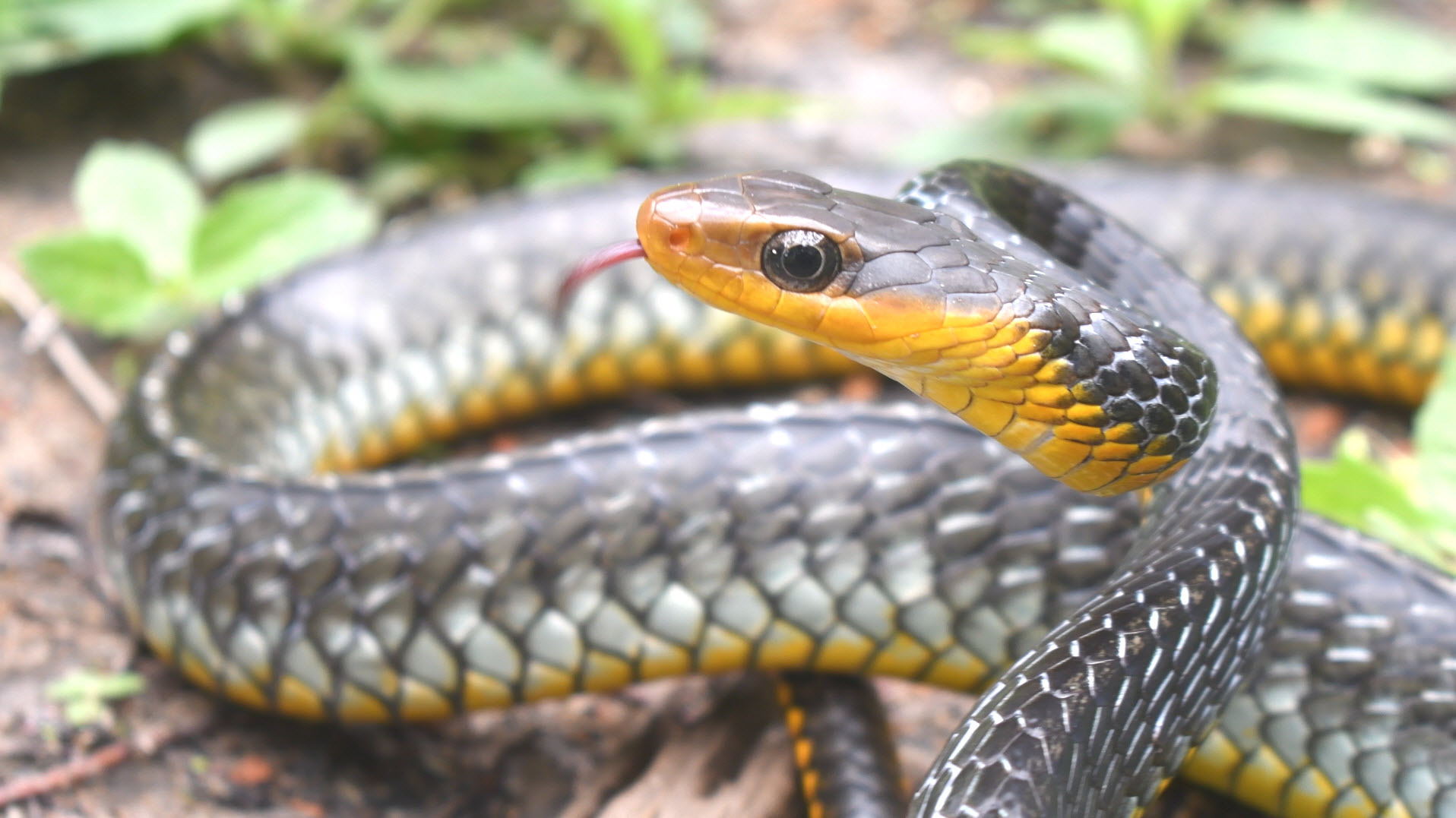
- In Brazil

Conservation status
- Least Concern (IUCN 3.1)

Scientific classification
- Kingdom: Animalia
- Phylum: Chordata
- Class: Reptilia
- Order: Squamata
- Suborder: Serpentes
- Family: Colubridae
- Genus: Chironius
- Species: C. carinatus

Binomial name
- Chironius carinatus (Linnaeus, 1758)

Synonyms
- Coluber carinatus Linnaeus, 1758; Herpetodryas carinatus Boulenger, 1894

= Chironius carinatus =

Species of snake

Chironius carinatus, commonly known as the Amazon coachwhip, is a long and slender, nonvenomous colubrid snake.

== Geographic range ==
It is endemic to the regions of Colombia, northern Brazil, Costa Rica, eastern Venezuela, northern Suriname, Guyana and Trinidad and Tobago.

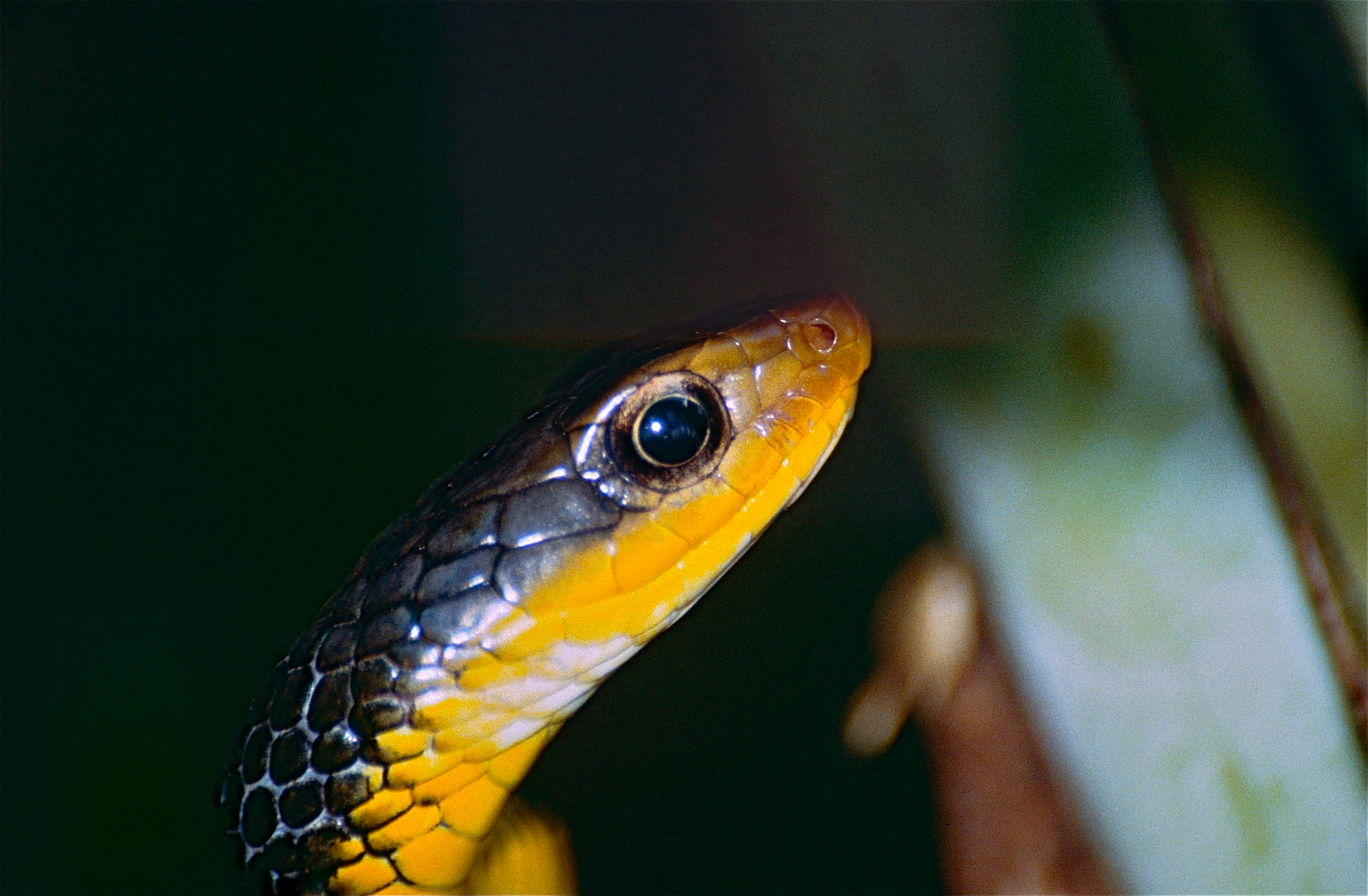
French Guiana

== Description ==
Chironius carinatus may grow to 3 meters (9.8 feet) in length. Their body color can range from brown to deep yellow or gold, with the tail being generally darker than the body. The belly is often a bright shade of yellow or orange. In most specimens, body scales have lightly colored centers with darker edges. A light colored stripe runs down the length of the body, fading at the tail. The dorsal scales are in 12 rows.

== Diet ==
It feeds on frogs (especially hylids), lizards, mice and birds.
