= Helminthophis =

Scientific classification
- Domain: Eukaryota
- Kingdom: Animalia
- Phylum: Chordata
- Class: Reptilia
- Order: Squamata
- Suborder: Serpentes
- Family: Anomalepididae
- Genus: Helminthophis; Peters, 1860

Synonyms
- Helminthophis - Peters, 1860; Idiotyphlops - Jan In Jan & Sordelli, 1860

Genus of snakes

Common names: (none).

Helminthophis is a genus of non-venomous blind snakes found in southern Central America and northwestern South America. Currently, 3 monotypic species are recognized.

== Geographic range ==
Found in southern Central America and northwestern South America in Costa Rica, Panama, Peru, Colombia and Venezuela. According to Hahn (1980), one species has possibly been introduced in Mauritius.

== Species ==
Species	Taxon author	Common name	Geographic range
Helminthophis flavoterminatus	(Peters, 1857)		South America in Colombia and Venezuela. Possibly introduced in Mauritius.
Helminthophis frontalis^{T}	(Peters, 1860)		Central America: Costa Rica and Panama.
Helminthophis praeocularis	Amaral, 1924		South America: northern Colombia in the inter-Andean areas of Tolima, Santander and Norte de Santander provinces.

^{T}) Type species.
