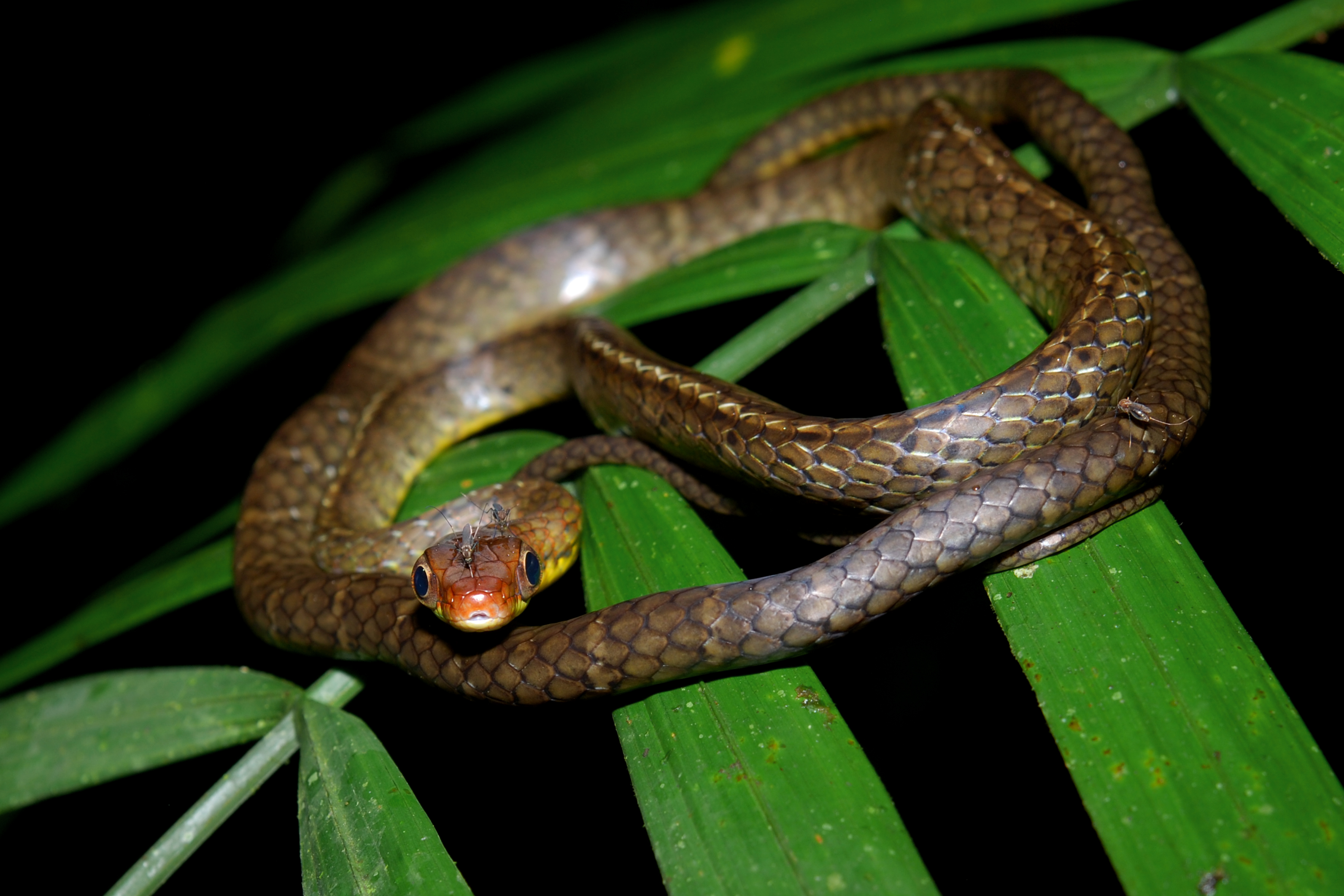

Conservation status
- Least Concern (IUCN 3.1)

Scientific classification
- Kingdom: Animalia
- Phylum: Chordata
- Class: Reptilia
- Order: Squamata
- Suborder: Serpentes
- Family: Colubridae
- Genus: Chironius
- Species: C. scurrulus

Binomial name
- Chironius scurrulus Wagler, 1824

Synonyms
- Natrix scurrula Wagler, 1824; Coluber scurrula - Wagler, 1830; Herpetodryas carinatus var. scurrula - Jan, 1863; Chironius scurrulus - Hoge, 1964

= Chironius scurrulus =

Smooth machete savane

Species of snake

Chironius scurrulus, commonly known as the smooth machete savane, is a large slender colubrid snake. It is also known as Wagler's sipo.

== Geographic range ==
It is found in tropical rainforests of the Brazilian Amazon, Southeastern Colombia, northern Bolivia, Ecuador, east of Venezuela, Peru, Trinidad and Tobago, Guyana, Suriname, French Guiana.

== Description ==
The dorsal scales are in only 10 rows.

== Habitat and biology ==
It feeds on frogs and lizards. They are diurnal. They live in primary and secondary forest habitats, on the ground or small trees, or in shrubs and bushes.
