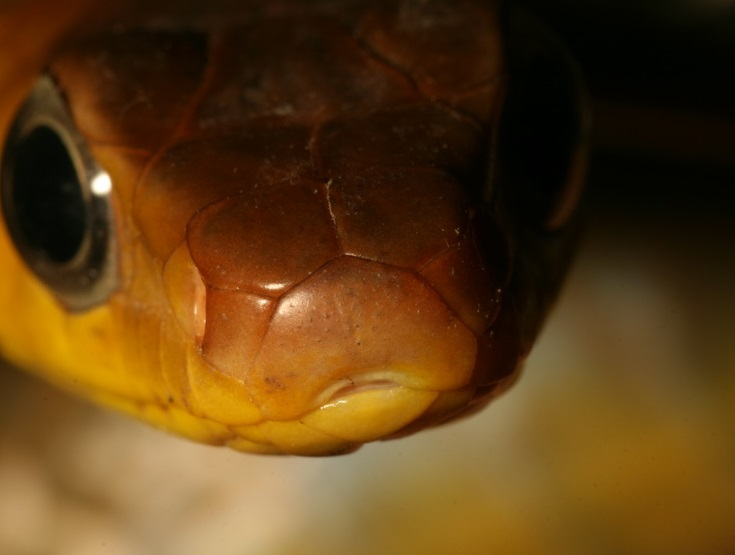

Conservation status
- Least Concern (IUCN 3.1)

Scientific classification
- Kingdom: Animalia
- Phylum: Chordata
- Class: Reptilia
- Order: Squamata
- Suborder: Serpentes
- Family: Colubridae
- Genus: Chironius
- Species: C. multiventris

Binomial name
- Chironius multiventris Schmidt & Walker, 1943

= Chironius multiventris =

Species of snake

Chironius multiventris, commonly known as the long-tailed machete savane, is species of colubrid snake.

== Geographic range ==
It is found in Peru, northern Venezuela, Colombia in the Guainía and Trinidad and Tobago.

== Description ==
The body is elongate, and strongly laterally compressed. The tail is long, as the common name implies. The dorsum is olive to light brown. There is a narrow whitish, black-edged, vertebral stripe. The upper labials and the ventrum are yellowish.

The ventrals are 178–183, and the subcaudals are 172–202. (Both these counts are higher than in C. carinatus.) The dorsal scales are arranged in 12 rows anteriorly and at midbody, in 10 rows posteriorly. (C. carinatus has 8 rows posteriorly.)

Adults may attain a total length of 136 cm (4 ft 6 in), with a tail 56 cm (22 in) long.

== Diet ==
Chironius multiventris feeds on frogs.
