= Liotyphlops =

Scientific classification
- Kingdom: Animalia
- Phylum: Chordata
- Class: Reptilia
- Order: Squamata
- Suborder: Serpentes
- Family: Anomalepididae
- Genus: Liotyphlops; W. Peters, 1881

Synonyms
- Rhinotyphlops (W. Peters, 1857) * Liotyphlops (W. Peters, 1881)

Genus of blind snakes

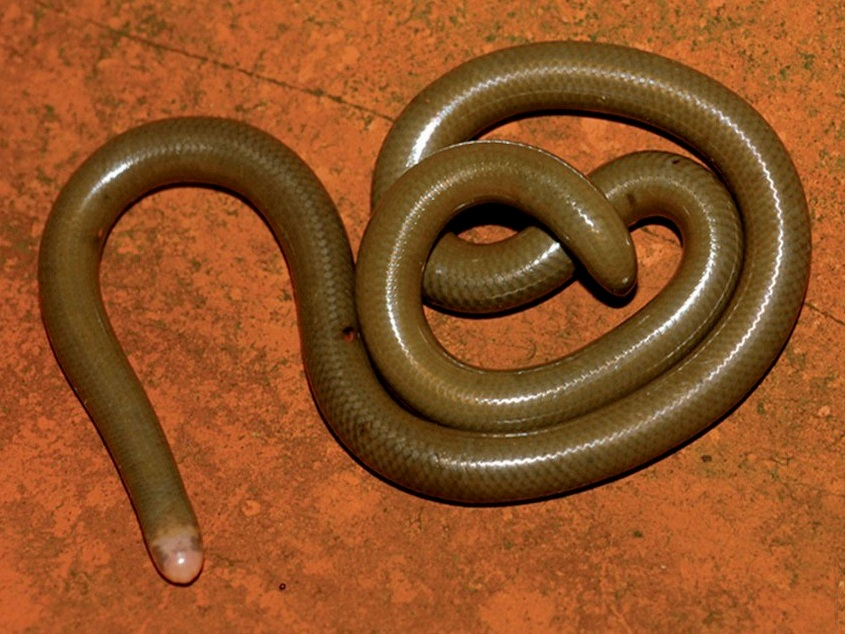
Liotyphlops beui

Liotyphlops is a genus of blind snakes in the family Anomalepididae. The genus is native to Central America and South America. Currently, 12 species are recognized as valid.

== Geographic range ==
Species of Liotyphlops occur in Central America and South America, from Costa Rica southward to Paraguay.

== Taxonomy ==
Head scutellation characters are important for the identification of Liotyphlops species based on external morphology. The genus is characterized by fossorial and cryptozooic habits and is primarily nocturnal.

== Species ==
The following species are recognized as valid within the genus Liotyphlops.

Species	Taxon author	Common name	Geographic range
Liotyphlops albirostris ^{T}	(W. Peters, 1857)	—	Southern Central America (including Costa Rica and Panama) and northern South America (Colombia, Ecuador, and north-central Venezuela). Also found on Curaçao.
Liotyphlops anops	(Cope, 1899)	—	Colombia (departments of Meta, Santander, and Cundinamarca).
Liotyphlops argaleus	Dixon & Kofron, 1984	—	Colombia (Cundinamarca Department).
Liotyphlops bondensis	(Griffin, 1916)	Armando’s blindsnake	Colombia
Liotyphlops caissara	Centeno, Sawaya & Germano, 2010	—	Brazil
Liotyphlops haadi	Silva-Haad, Franco & Maldonado, 2008	—	Colombia
Liotyphlops palauophis	Marra Santos, 2023	—	Colombia
Liotyphlops schubarti	Vanzolini, 1948	—	Brazil (Pirassununga, São Paulo).
Liotyphlops taylori	Marra-Santos & Reis, 2018	—	Brazil (Mato Grosso).
Liotyphlops ternetzii	(Boulenger, 1896)	—	Brazil (Pará, Goiás, São Paulo, and Mato Grosso), Paraguay, and Uruguay.
Liotyphlops trefauti	Freire, Caramasche & Suzart Argôlo, 2007	—	Brazil
Liotyphlops wilderi	(Garman, 1883)	—	Brazil (Minas Gerais and Rio de Janeiro).

^{T} = Type species

Nota bene: A taxon author in parentheses indicates that the species was originally described in a genus other than Liotyphlops.
