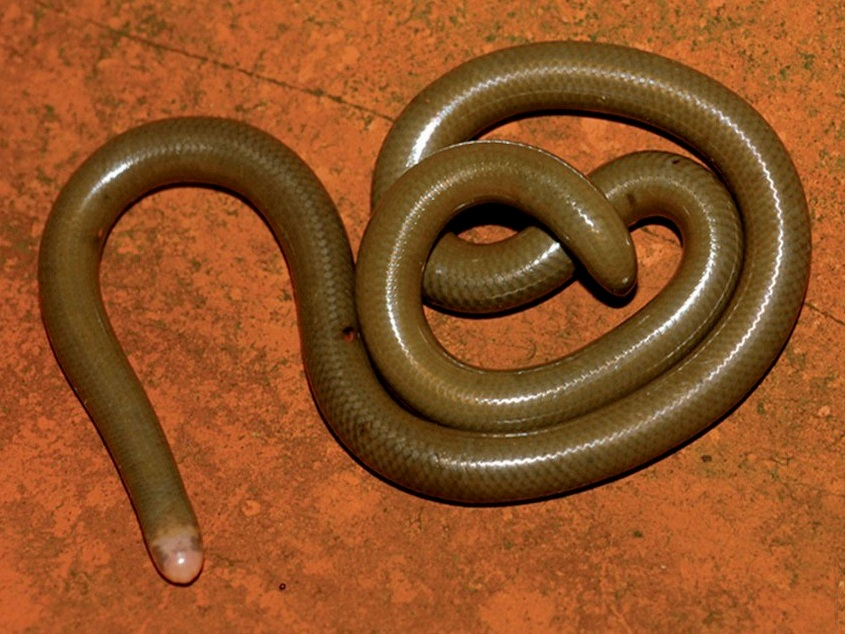
- Pale-headed blindsnake (Liotyphlops beui)

Scientific classification
- Kingdom: Animalia
- Phylum: Chordata
- Class: Reptilia
- Order: Squamata
- Suborder: Serpentes
- Infraorder: Scolecophidia
- Family: Anomalepididae; Taylor, 1939

Synonyms
- Anomalepidae Taylor, 1939; Anomalepidinae Amaral, 1954; Anomalepididae Robb & H.M. Smith, 1966

= Anomalepididae =

Family of snakes

The Anomalepididae are a family of nonvenomous snakes, native to Central and South America. They are similar to Typhlopidae, except that some species possess a single tooth in the lower jaw. Currently, four genera and 15 species are recognized. Common names include primitive blind snake and dawn blind snake.

== Description ==
Species in the family Anomalepididae are small snakes, in total length (including tail) usually less than 30 cm (12 in), with blunt heads and short, blunt tails. They are mainly burrowing snakes, and due to their life style their eyes are vestigial.

== Geographic range ==
The family Anomalepididae is found from Southern Central America to north-western South America. Disjunct populations occur in north-eastern and south-eastern South America.

== Genera ==
| Genus | Taxon author | Species | Common name | Geographic range |
|---|---|---|---|---|
| Anomalepis^{T} | Jan, 1860 | 4 | | From southern Central America in Nicaragua, Costa Rica and Panama, to north-western South America in Colombia, Ecuador and Peru. |
| Helminthophis | W. Peters, 1860 | 3 | | From southern Central America in Costa Rica and Panama, to northwestern South America in Colombia and Venezuela. Possibly, one species has been introduced in Mauritius. |
| Liotyphlops | W. Peters, 1881 | 12 | | Central and South America from Costa Rica south to Paraguay. |
| Typhlophis | Fitzinger, 1843 | 1 | | Along the Atlantic coast of South America from the Guyanas to Pará state in northern Brazil. Also on the island of Trinidad. |

^{T}) Type genus.
