= List of snakes of Colombia =

The nearly 300 species of snake found in Colombia represent nine of the eighteen families. Six families (Aniliidae, Boidae, Colubridae, Elapidae, Tropidophiidae, Viperidae) are within the infraorder Alethinophidia (advanced snakes) and three families (Anomalepididae, Leptotyphlopidae, Typhlopidae) are within the infraorder Scolecophidia (blind snakes).

The largest snake ever known, Titanoboa, was discovered as a fossil in northeastern Colombia.

== Aniliidae ==
Pipe Snakes
Scientific name	Common name	Distribution	Status
Anilius scytale	Red Pipe Snake	Amazon basin	

== Boidae ==
Boas
Scientific name	Common name	Distribution	Status
Boa constrictor	Boa Constrictor	Throughout; mostly rainforest	Endemic
Corallus annulatus	Annulated Tree Boa	Pacific region	
Corallus batesii	Amazon Basin Emerald Tree Boa	Amazon basin	
Corallus hortulanus	Amazon Tree Boa	Amazon basin	
Corallus ruschenbergerii	Ruschenberger Tree Boa	Caribbean lowlands & Orinoquia region	
Epicrates cenchria	Brazilian Rainbow Boa	Amazon & Orinoquia regions	Endemic
Epicrates maurus	Colombian Rainbow Boa	Caribbean region; dry forest	Native
Eunectes murinus	Green Anaconda	Amazon & Orinoquia regions	

== Colubridae ==
Colubrid Snakes
Scientific name	Common name	Distribution	Status
Amastridium veliferum	Rusty-headed Snake	Northwest Colombia	
Apostolepis niceforoi	Amazon Burrowing Snake	Amazon basin	
Atractus andinus	Andean Ground Snake	Andes (Antioquia)	Endemic
Atractus apophis	Huila Spindle Snake	East slope of Central Andes (Huila), 1640 m	Endemic
Atractus arangoi	Putumayo Spindle Snake	Southern Colombia (Putumayo)	Endemic
Atractus atratus	Dark-belled Spindle Snake	East slope of Central Andes (Huila), 1700–2000 m	Endemic
Atractus attenuates	Slender Spindle Snake	Central Andes (Antioquia), 1000 m	Endemic
Atractus avernus	Caquetá Spindle Snake	Colombia (Caquetá)	Endemic
Atractus badius	French Guyana Ground Snake	Caribbean lowlands	
Atractus biseriatus	Two-lined Ground Snake	Central Andes (Caldas)	Endemic
Atractus bocourti	Bocourt's Ground Snake	West slopes of Andes (2000–3130 m)	
Atractus boulengerii	Boulenger's Ground Snake	Pacific lowlands (Valle del Cauca)	Endemic
Atractus charitoae	Vaupés Spindle Snake	Amazon basin (Vaupés)	
Atractus chthonius	Finca Meremburg Spindle Snake	East slope of Central Andes (Cauca, Huila), 1500–2400 m	Endemic
Atractus clarki	Clark's Ground Snake	Northwest Colombia (Darién)	
Atractus collaris	Collared Ground Snake	Amazon basin (Amazonas, Caquetá)	
Atractus crassicaudatus	Thickhead Ground Snake	East Andes (Boyacá & Cundinamarca), 2000–3200 m	Endemic
Atractus echidna	Nariño Spindle Snake	Southern Pacific lowlands (Nariño)	
Atractus elaps	Black Ground Snake	Amazon basin	
Atractus erythromelas	Red-black Ground Snake	Eastern Colombia along border with Venezuela	
Atractus franciscopaivai	La Pedrera Spindle Snake	Amazon basin	
Atractus guentheri	Günther's Ground Snake	Amazon basin	
Atractus heliobelluomini	La Chorrera Spindle Snake	Amazon basin	
Atractus indistinctus	Indistinct Ground Snake	Northern Colombia (Norte de Santander)	Endemic
Atractus iridescens	Iridescent Ground Snake	Pacific lowlands (Chocó)	Endemic
Atractus lasallei	Lasalle's Ground Snake	Northern Colombia (Antioquia)	Endemic
Atractus latifrons	Broadhead Ground Snake	Amazon basin	
Atractus lehmanni	Lehmann's Ground Snake	Southwest Colombia (Cauca)	
Atractus limitaneus	Limitan Ground Snake	Amazon basin	Endemic
Atractus loveridgei	Loveridge's Ground Snake	Northern Colombia (Antioquia)	Endemic
Atractus macondo	Macondo Spindle Snake	Northern Colombia (Magdalena)	Endemic
Atractus major	Brown Ground Snake	Amazon slope of East Andes (Caquetá), to 3000 m	
Atractus manizalesensis	Villamaria Spindle Snake	Central Andes (Caldas)	Endemic
Atractus medusa	Gorgona Spindle Snake	Gorgona Island	Endemic ?
Atractus melanogaster	Blackbelly Ground Snake	Central Andes (Tolima, Antioquia)	Endemic
Atractus melas	Dark Ground Snake	Pacific lowlands (Chocó, Valle del Cauca), 80–300 m	Endemic
Atractus multicinctus	Banded Ground Snake	Pacific lowlands (Valle del Cauca, Cauca, Nariño)	
Atractus nasutus	Sharp-nosed Spindle Snake	Central Andes (Antioquia), 2600 m	Endemic
Atractus natans	Mamirauá Spindle Snake	Amazon basin	
Atractus nicefori	Northern Ground Snake	West & Central Andes (Antioquia), 2000–2500 m	Endemic; Vulnerable
Atractus nigriventris	Black-vented Ground Snake	East Andes (Santander)	Endemic
Atractus obesus	Fat Ground Snake	West Andes (Antioquia, Valle del Cauca)	Endemic
Atractus obtusirostris	Bignose Ground Snake	Central Andes (Tolima, Caldas)	Endemic
Atractus occipitoalbus	Gray Ground Snake	Amazon slope of Andes (Putumayo), 775–850 m	
Atractus oculotemporalis	Hispanic Ground Snake	Northern Colombia (Antioquia)	Endemic
Atractus orcesi	Orellana Spindle Snake	Amazon slope of Andes (Cauca, Huila, Putumayo), 500–3000 m	
Atractus paisa	Sonsón Spindle Snake	Central Andes (Antioquia), 2600 m	Endemic
Atractus pamplonensis	Pamplona Ground Snake	Eastern Colombia (Norte de Santander)	
Atractus poeppigi	Basin Ground Snake	Amazon basin	
Atractus punctiventris	Pointed Ground Snake	Central Colombia (Meta)	Endemic
Atractus reticulatus	Reticulated Ground Snake	Amazon basin	
Atractus sanctaemartae	Santa Marta Ground Snake	Santa Marta Mountains	Endemic
Atractus sanguineus	Bloody Ground Snake	Central Andes (Antioquia)	Endemic
Atractus snethlageae	Gurupi River Spindle Snake	Amazon basin	
Atractus titanicus	Titan Spindle Snake	Central Andes (Antioquia, Valle del Cauca), 1800–2400 m	Endemic
Atractus torquatus	Neckbanded Ground Snake	Amazon basin	
Atractus trivittatus	Three-banded Ground Snake	East Andes (Santander)	Endemic
Atractus typhon	Typhon Spindle Snake	Pacific slope of West Andes (Nariño)	
Atractus univittatus	One-banded Ground Snake	Eastern Colombia (Meta)	
Atractus variegatus	Variegated Ground Snake	East Andes (Boyacá)	Endemic
Atractus vertebrolineatus	Striped Ground Snake	East Andes (Santander)	Endemic
Atractus wagleri	Wagler's Ground Snake	East Andes (Boyacá)	Endemic
Atractus werneri	Werner's Ground Snake	West slope of East Andes (Cundinamarca), 1200–1800 m	Endemic
Atractus zidoki	Zidok's Ground Snake	Amazon basin	
Chironius carinatus	Machete Savane or Sipo	Throughout	
Chironius exoletus	Linnaeus' Sipo	Amazon basin, Pacific lowlands?	
Chironius fuscus	Brown Sipo	Amazon basin	
Chironius grandisquamis	Ecuador Sipo	Pacific lowlands	
Chironius monticola	Mountain Sipo	Andes, 2100–3000 m	
Chironius multiventris	South American Sipo	Amazon & Orinoquia regions	
Chironius scurrulus	Wagler's Sipo	Amazon basin	
Chlorosoma viridissimum	Common Green Racer	Amazon basin	
Clelia clelia	Mussurana	Throughout	
Clelia equatoriana	Equatorial Mussurana	Pacific slope of West Andes, 1000–2000 m	
Clelia scytalina	Highland Mussurana	Northwest Colombia ?	
Coluber mentovarius	Neotropical Whip Snake	Caribbean region	
Coniophanes andresensis	San Andrés Island Snake	San Andrés Island	Endemic
Coniophanes fissidens	Yellowbelly Snake	Pacific lowlands	
Dendrophidion bivittatus	Forest Racer	West Colombia, to 1600 m	
Dendrophidion boshelli	Hoshell's Forest Racer	Magdalena River Valley (Cundinamarca), 250 m	Endemic
Dendrophidion dendrophis	Olive Forest Racer	Amazon basin	
Dendrophidion nuchale	Pink-tailed Forest Racer	North & West Colombia - lowlands and foothills	
Dendrophidion percarinatus	South American Forest Racer	North & West Colombia lowlands	
Diaphorolepis laevis	Colombian Frog-eating Snake	Pacific slope of West Andes	Endemic
Diaphorolepis wagneri	Ecuador Frog-eating Snake	Pacific lowlands	
Dipsas baliomelas	Macarena Mountains Snail-eater	Macarena Mountains (Meta)	Endemic
Dipsas catesbyi	Catesby's Snail-eater	Amazon basin	
Dipsas ellipsifera	Ibarra Snail-eater	Southwest Colombia	
Dipsas gracilis	Graceful Snail-eater	Pacific slope of West Andes, to 1250 m	
Dipsas indica	Neotropical Snail-eater	East slope of East Andes, to 750 m	
Dipsas pavonina	Northern Snail-eater	Amazon basin	
Dipsas peruana	Peruvian Snail-eater	East slope of East Andes, 500–3000 m	
Dipsas pratti	Pratt's Snail-eater	Andes (Antioquia)	
Dipsas sanctijoannis	Tropical Snail-eater	West & Central Andes (Caldas, Quindio, Valle del Cauca, Cauca), above 1000 m	Endemic
Dipsas temporalis	Temporal Snail-eater	Pacific lowlands	
Dipsas viguieri	Bocourt's Snail-eater	Pacific lowlands	
Drepanoides anomalus	Black-collared Snake	Amazon basin	
Drymarchon caudomaculatus	Spot-tailed Cribo	Northeast Colombia	
Drymarchon corais	Black-tailed Indigo Snake	West of the Andes, to 2630 m	
Drymarchon melanurus	Black-tailed Cribo	Western Colombia	
Drymobius margaritiferus	Speckled Racer	Caribbean lowlands	
Drymobius rhombifer	Esmerald Racer	Caribbean lowlands & Amazon basin	
Drymoluber dichrous	Northern Woodland Racer	Amazon basin	
Echinanthera undulata	Undulated Leaf-litter Snake	Amazon basin	
Enuliophis sclateri	Colombian Long-tailed Snake	Northern Colombia, to 1285 m	
Enulius flavitorques	Pacific Long-tailed Snake	North & West Colombia lowlands	
Erythrolamprus aesculapii	Aesculapian False Coral Snake	Amazon basin	
Erythrolamprus bizona	False Coral Snake	Throughout, to 2600 m	
Erythrolamprus breviceps	Short Ground Snake	Amazon basin	
Erythrocamprus cobella	Mangrove Snake	Lowlands throughout	
Erythrolamprus epinephelus	Sabanera Snake	Throughout	
Erythrolamprus melanotus	Black-backed Snake	Northern Colombia	
Erythrolamprus miliaris	Military Ground Snake	Amazon basin	
Erythrolamprus mimus	Mimic False Coral Snake	Pacific lowlands	
Erythrolamprus pseudocorallus	False Coral Snake	Central & East Colombia, 100–2300 m	
Erythrolamprus pyburni	Pyburn's Tropical Forest Snake	Central Colombia (Meta)	Endemic
Erythrolamprus pygmaeus	Amazon Tropical Forest Snake	Amazon basin	
Erythrolamprus reginae	Royal Ground Snake	Amazon basin	
Erythrolamprus taeniogaster	Ground Snake	Amazon basin	
Erythrolamprus taeniurus	Thin Ground Snake	Amazon slope of Andes, 840–3825 m	
Erythrolamprus typhlus	Velvet Swamp Snake	Amazon basin	
Erythrolamprus vitti	Maldonado's Snake	Pacific slope of West Andes	
Geophis betaniensis	Betanien Earth Snake	East slope of West Andes (Valle del Cauca), 1000–1750 m	Endemic
Geophis hoffmanni	Hoffmann's Earth Snake	Northwest Colombia ?	
Geophis nigroalbus	Colombian Earth Snake	Andes (Antioquia, Santander, Valle del Cauca), 900–1700 m	Endemic
Helicops angulatus	Mountains Keelback	East of Andes	
Helicops carinicauda	Wied's Keelback	Southeast Colombia	
Helicops danieli	Daniel's Keelback	Northwest Colombia lowlands	Endemic
Helicops hagmanni	Hagmann's Keelback	Amazon basin	
Helicops leopardinus	Leopard Keelback	Amazon basin ??	
Helicops pastazae	Shreve's Keelback	Amazon basin	
Helicops polylepis	Norman's Keelback	Amazon basin	
Helicops scalaris	Ladder Keelback	Caribbean lowlands	
Hydrodynastes bicinctus	Herrmann's Water Snake	Amazon basin	
Hydromorphus concolor	Costa Rica Water Snake	Pacific lowlands	
Hydrops martii	Amazon Water Snake	Amazon basin	
Hydrops triangularis	Triangle Water Snake	Amazon basin	
Imantodes cenchoa	Blunthead Tree Snake	Throughout	
Imantodes gemmistratus	Central American Tree Snake	Northwest Colombia	
Imantodes inornatus	Plain Tree Snake	Pacific lowlands	
Imantodes lentiferus	Amazon Basin Tree Snake	Amazon basin	
Lampropeltis triangulum	Milksnake	Throughout, to 2600 m	
Leptodeira annulata	Banded Cat-eyed Snake	Throughout, to 1950 m	
Leptodeira septentrionalis	Northern Cat-eyed Snake	Throughout	
Leptophis ahaetulla	Parrot Snake	Throughout	
Leptophis cupreus	Copper Parrot Snake	Pacific & Amazon regions (Chocó, Meta)	
Leptophis depressirostris	Cope's Parrot Snake	Pacific lowlands	
Leptophis riveti	Despax's Parrot Snake	North & West Colombia lowlands	
Leptophis santamartensis	Santa Marta Parrot Snake	Santa Marta Mountains;	Endemic
Lygophis lineatus	Lined Ground Snake	North & West Colombia	
Mastigodryas bifossatus	Swamp Racer	East of Andes	
Mastigodryas boddaerti	Boddaert's Tropical Racer	East of Andes	
Mastigodryas danieli	Daniel's Tropical Racer	Northern Colombia (Antioquia)	
Mastigodryas melanolomus	Salmon-bellied Racer	Northwest Colombia	
Mastigodryas pleei	Plee's Tropical Racer	Caribbean lowlands	
Mastigodryas pulchriceps	Cope's Tropical Racer	Pacific region & Inter-Andean valleys, to 2800 m	
Ninia atrata	Red-naped Snake	Throughout	
Nothopsis rugosus	Rough Coffee Snake	Pacific region	
Oxybelis aeneus	Brown Vine Snake	Throughout	
Oxybelis brevirostris	Cope's Vine Snake	Pacific lowlands	
Oxybelis fulgidus	Green Vine Snake	Lowlands throughout	
Oxyrhopus formosus	Yellow-headed Calico Snake	East of Andes	
Oxyrhopus leucomelas	Werner's False Coral Snake	East slope of East Andes	
Oxyrhopus melanogenys	Tschudi's False Coral Snake	Amazon basin	
Oxyrhopus occipitalis	Northern Calico Snake	Amazon basin	
Oxyrhopus petolarius	Forest Flame Snake	Lowlands east and west of Andes	
Oxyrhopus vanidicus	Leticia Calico Snake	Amazon basin	
Phylodryas argentea	Striped Sharpnose Snake	Amazon basin	
Philodryas olfersii	Lichtenstein's Green Racer	Amazon basin	
Phimophis guianensis	Troschel's Pampas Snake	Caribbean lowlands	
Phrynonax sexcarinatus	Wagler's Puffing Snake	Amazon basin	
Plesiodipsas perijanensis	Alemán's Snail-eater	East Andes (Santander) & Perijá Mountains	
Pliocercus euryzonus	Black Halloween Snake	Pacific lowlands & foothills	
Pseudoboa coronata	Crowned False Boa	Amazon basin	
Pseudoboa neuwiedii	Neuwied's False Boa	Northern lowlands	
Pseudoeryx plicatilis	South American Pond Snake	Amazon basin	
Pseustes poecilonotus	Puffing Snake	Pacific & Caribbean lowlands	
Pseustes shropshirei	Shropshire's Puffing Snake	Pacific lowlands	
Rhadinaea decorata	Adorned Graceful Brown Snake	Northwest Colombia	
Rhinobothryum bovallii	False Tree Coral	Pacific & Caribbean lowlands	
Rhinobothryum lentiginosum	Amazon Banded Snake	Amazon & Orinoquia regions	
Saphenophis antioquiensis	Dunn's Saphenophis Snake	Antioquia, 2560 m	
Saphenophis boursieri	Bourcier's Saphenophis Snake	Pacific foothills of West Andes	
Saphenophis sneiderni	Saphenophis Snake	West Andes (Cauca)	Endemic
Saphenophis tristriatus	Three-striped Smooth Ground Snake	West Andes (Cauca)	Endemic
Scaphiodontophis annulatus	Neck-banded Snake	Northwest Colombia	
Scaphiodontophis venustissimus	Common Neck-banded Snake	Pacific lowlands	
Sibon nebulata	Cloudy Snail-eating Snake	Caribbean lowlands	
Siphlophis cervinus	Checkerbelly	Amazon basin	
Siphlophis compressus	Tropical Flat Snake	Pacific lowlands	
Spilotes pullatus	Yellow Rat Snake	Throughout	
Spilotes sulphureus	Amazon Puffing Snake	Amazon basin	
Stenorrhina degenhardtii	Degenhardt's Scorpion-eating Snake	Pacific & Caribbean lowlands, Andes	
Synophis bicolor	Two-colored Fishing Snake	Amazon basin	
Synophis lasallei	Lasalle's Fishing Snake	Amazon basin	
Synophis plectovertebralis	Braided Shadow Snake	Pacific slope of West Andes (Valle del Cauca)	Endemic
Taeniophallus brevirostris	Short-nosed Ground Snake	Amazon basin	
Taeniophallus occipitalis	Bahia Leaf Litter Snake	Amazon basin	
Tantilla alticola	Boulenger's Centipede Snake	Northwest Colombia	
Tantilla melanocephala	Black-headed Snake	Throughout	
Tantilla nigra	Black Centipede Snake	Pacific lowlands (Chocó)	Endemic
Tantilla reticulata	Reticulate Centipede Snake	Northwest Colombia	
Tantilla semicincta	Ringed Centipede Snake	Caribbean lowlands	
Thamnodynastes gambotensis	Gambote Mock Viper	Caribbean lowlands (Bolivar)	Endemic
Thamnodynastes pallidus	Amazon Coastal House Snake	Amazon & Orinoquia regions	
Tretanorhinus taeniatus	Striped Swamp Snake	Pacific lowlands	
Urotheca decipiens	Pale Ground Snake	Pacific lowlands	
Urotheca dumerilli	Dumeril's Boxtail Snake	Pacific lowlands (Chocó)	Endemic
Urotheca fulviceps	Tawny-headed Glass-tailed Snake	Pacific & Caribbean lowlands	
Urotheca lateristriga	Ribboned Brittle Snake	Pacific lowlands & foothills	
Urotheca multilineata	Many-striped Glass-tailed Snake	Eastern Colombia	
Urotheca pachyura	Thick-tailed Glass-tailed Snake	Pacific lowlands	
Xenodon rabdocephalus	False Fer-de-Lance	Throughout	
Xenodon severus	Amazon False Fer-de-lance	Amazon basin	
Xenopholis scalaris	Wucherer's Ground Snake	Amazon basin	

== Elapidae ==
Coral Snakes & Sea Snake
Scientific name	Common name	Distribution	Status
Micrurus ancoralis	Regal Coral Snake	Pacific lowlands, to 1500 m	
Micrurus bocourti	False Triad Coral Snake	Pacific lowlands	
Micrurus camilae	Camila's Coral Snake	Northern Colombia (Urrá, Córdoba)	Endemic
Micrurus clarki	Clark's Coral Snake	Pacific lowlands, to 500 m	
Micrurus dissoleucus	Pygmy Coral Snake	Northern Colombia, to 500 m	
Micrurus dumerilii	Capuchin Coral Snake	Pacific lowlands, Gorgona Island, Andean region, Santa Marta Mountains	
Micrurus filiformis	Slender Coral Snake	Amazon & Orinoquia regions, to 400 m	
Micrurus hemprichii	Hemprich's Coral Snake	Amazon & Orinoquia regions, to 1200 m	
Micrurus isozonus	Equal-banded Coral Snake	Orinoquia region, to 1400 m	
Micrurus langsdorffi	Confused Coral Snake	Amazon basin, to 500 m	
Micrurus lemniscatus	South American Coral Snake	Amazon & Orinoquia regions, to 1000 m	
Micrurus medemi	Medem's Coral Snake	Central Colombia (Meta)	Endemic
Micrurus mipartitus	Red-tailed Coral Snake	Pacific lowlands, Gorgona Island, Andean region, Santa Marta Mountains	
Micrurus multifasciatus	Many-banded Coral Snake	Pacific lowlands	
Micrurus multiscutatus	Cauca Coral Snake	Pacific slope of West Andes (Cauca), 100–900 m	Native
Micrurus narduccii	Andean Black-backed Coral Snake	Amazon foothills of East Andes (Putumayo), 100–1500 m	
Micrurus nattereri	Natterer's Coral Snake	Amazon & Orinoquia regions, to 600 m	
Micrurus nigrocinctus	Central American Coral Snake	Northwest Colombia (Darién), Providencia Island	Native
Micrurus obscurus	Bolivian Coral Snake	Amazon basin	
Micrurus oligoanellatus	Tambo Coral Snake	Pacific slope of West Andes (Cauca), 1000–1500 m	Endemic
Micrurus ornatissimus	Ornate Coral Snake	Amazon basin	
Micrurus psyches	Carib Coral Snake	Amazon basin	
Micrurus putumayensis	Putumayo Coral Snake	Amazon basin	Native
Micrurus remotus	Neblina Coral Snake	East Colombia (Guainía, Guaviare, Vaupés)	
Micrurus renjifoi	Ringed Slender Coral Snake	East Colombia (Vichada)	Endemic
Micrurus sangilensis	Santander Coral Snake	East Andes (Boyacá, Cundinamarca, Santander), 1000–1700 m	Endemic
Micrurus scutiventris	Pygmy Slender Coral Snake	Amazon basin	
Micrurus spixii	Amazon Coral Snake	Amazon & Orinoquia regions, to 1200 m	
Micrurus spurrelli	Butterfly-head Coral Snake	Pacific lowlands (Chocó), to 400 m	Endemic
Micrurus surinamensis	Aquatic Coral Snake	Amazon & Orinoquia regions, to 600 m	
Pelamis platura	Yellow-bellied Sea Snake	Pacific Ocean, Gorgona Island	

== Tropidophiidae ==
Dwarf Boas
Scientific name	Common name	Distribution	Status
Trachyboa boulengeri	Northern Eyelash Boa	Pacific lowlands	Endemic
Ungaliophis panamensis	Panamanian Dwarf Boa	Pacific lowlands	Endemic

== Viperidae ==
Pit Vipers
Scientific name	Common name	Distribution	Status
Bothriechis schlegelii	Eyelash Viper	Throughout, to 2600 m; dense humid forest (Caldas, Antioquia, Risaralda & Chocó)	Endemic
Bothrocophias campbelli	Ecuadorian Toad-headed Pitviper	Southwest Colombia, 1000–1500 m	
Bothrocophias colombianus	Colombian Toad-headed Pitviper	Western slopes of West Andes (Cauca & Antioquia)	Native
Bothrocophias hyoprora	Amazonian Toad-headed Pitviper	Amazon basin	
Bothrocophias microphthalmus	Small-eyed Toad-headed Pitviper	Western Colombia	
Bothrocophias myersi	Chocoan Toad-headed Pitviper	Pacific lowlands (Cauca & Valle del Cauca), 75–200 m;	Endemic
Bothrocophias myrringae	High-Andean Toad-Headed Pitviper	Throughout, to 2600 m; (Boyacá)	Native
Bothrocophias tulitoi	Unknown	Throughout, to 2600 m; Altiplano cundioboyacense (Boyacá)	Native
Bothrops asper	Fer-de-lance	Throughout, to 1500 m; Gorgona Island	
Bothrops atrox	Common Lancehead	East of Andes	
Bothrops ayerbei	Patian Lancehead	Southwest Colombia (Cauca), 1400m	Endemic
Bothrops bilineatus	Two-striped Forest Pitviper	Amazon basin	Endemic
Bothrops brazili	Brazil's Lancehead	Amazon basin	
Bothrops colombiensis	Colombia Lancehead	Eastern Colombia	Native
Bothrops oligobalius	Unknown	Amazon Basin (Amazonas, Vaupés)	Endemic
Bothrops pulcher	Andean Forest Pitviper	Eastern slopes of Andes, 1000–2000 m	
Bothrops punctatus	Chocoan Forest Pitviper	Pacific region, to 2000 m	
Bothrops rhombeatus	Cauca Valley Yellow Lancehead	Southwest Colombia (Cauca, Valle del Cauca)	Endemic
Bothrops taeniatus	Speckled Forest Pitviper	East of Andes; forest	
Bothrops venezuelensis	Venezuelan Lancehead	East Andes (Norte de Santander & Boyacá)	
Crotalus durissus	South American Rattlesnake	Isolated populations throughout, to 2000 m; usually not forest	Native
Lachesis acrochorda	Chocoan Bushmaster	Pacific region, to 1000 m	Native
Lachesis muta	South American Bushmaster	East of Andes	
Porthidium lansbergii	Lansberg's Hog-nosed Pitviper	Caribbean lowlands	
Porthidium nasutum	Rainforest Hog-nosed Pitviper	Caribbean & Pacific lowland	

== Anomalepidae ==
Primitive Blind Snakes
Scientific name	Common name	Distribution	Status
Anomalepis colombia	Caldas Blind Snake	Central Andes (Caldas), 1700 m	Endemic
Helminthophis flavoterminatus	Yellowtail Blind Snake	Caribbean lowlands	
Helminthophis praeocularis	Preocular Blind Snake	Magdalena River Valley	Endemic
Liotyphlops albirostris	Whitenose Blind Snake	Caribbean lowlands, foothills of East Andes	
Liotyphlops anops	Cope's Blind Snake	East Andes (Santander, Cundinamarca)	Endemic
Liotyphlops argaleus	Vexatious Blind Snake	East Andes (Cundinamarca)	Endemic
Liotyphlops haadi	Haad's Blind Snake	Amazon basin	

== Leptotyphlopidae ==
Slender Blind Snakes
Scientific name	Common name	Distribution	Status
Leptotyphlops macrolepis	Big-scaled Blind Snake	-	

== Typhlopidae ==
Worm Snakes
Scientific name	Common name	Distribution	Status
Typhlops brongersmianus	Brongersma's Worm Snake	East of Andes	
Typhlops minuisquamus	Basin Worm Snake	Amazon basin	
Typhlops reticulatus	Reticulate Worm Snake	East of Andes	

== See also ==
- Fauna of Colombia
- Reptiles of Colombia
- Lizards of Colombia
