= Saphenophis snake =

There is a genus of snake named saphenophis snake:

- Saphenophis

There is also a species of snake named saphenophis snake

- Saphenophis sneiderni
