= Brown ground snake =

There are two species of snake named brown ground snake:

- Atractus major
- Atractus arangoi
