= Bothrocophias myrringae =

Scientific classification
- Kingdom: Animalia
- Phylum: Chordata
- Class: Reptilia
- Order: Squamata
- Suborder: Serpentes
- Family: Viperidae
- Genus: Bothrocophias
- Species: B. myrringae

Binomial name
- Bothrocophias myrringae Angarita-Sierra, Cubides-Cubillos, & Hurtado-Gómez, 2022

Species of snake

Bothrocophias myrringae, also known as the High-Andean Toad-Headed Pitviper, is a species of venomous pit viper found in Colombia. It is named in honour of the philosophical and conceptual advisor of professor Tulio Manuel Angarita Serrano, Angarita-Sierra's mother, Myriam Sierra Guerrero who contributed to the development of the current Colombian education model - 'Myrringa' being a Spanish nickname meaning "pinch" or "small".

== Description ==
Bothrocophias myrringae can be identified by many characters including specific scale counts, as well as the 28 or more dark brown bands or pairs of blotches on its sides which display pale centers, bright red or orange speckles and black spots on the tail, mottled brown creamy yellow underbelly which forms a white-cream stripe interrupted by dark spots and dark brown pigment toward the tail.

B. myrringae exhibits sexual dimorphism. Females display a creamish or pale yellow in the labial and gular scales. In addition, males usually have mottled brown eyes with orange speckles while females have orange-gold eyes with a peppering of brown.

== Behaviour ==
When threatened, Bothrocophias myrringae is known to vibrate its tail, attempt to bite and to secrete a white substance from its cloaca. These reactions are common in other Toad-Headed vipers (Bothrocophias microphthalmus and Bothrocophias hyoprora) as well as the latter two being common in Viperids as a whole.
