= Saphenophis atahuallpae =

Conservation status
- Data Deficient (IUCN 3.1)

Scientific classification
- Kingdom: Animalia
- Phylum: Chordata
- Class: Reptilia
- Order: Squamata
- Suborder: Serpentes
- Family: Colubridae
- Genus: Saphenophis
- Species: S. atahuallpae

Binomial name
- Saphenophis atahuallpae (Steindachner, 1901)

Species of snake

Saphenophis atahuallpae, the Atahuallpa saphenophis snake, is a species of snake in the family Colubridae. It is found in Ecuador.
