= Bothrocophias lojanus =

- Bothrocophias lojanus in Ecuador

Conservation status
- Vulnerable (IUCN 3.1)

Scientific classification
- Kingdom: Animalia
- Phylum: Chordata
- Class: Reptilia
- Order: Squamata
- Suborder: Serpentes
- Family: Viperidae
- Genus: Bothrocophias
- Species: B. lojanus

Binomial name
- Bothrocophias lojanus (Parker, 1930)
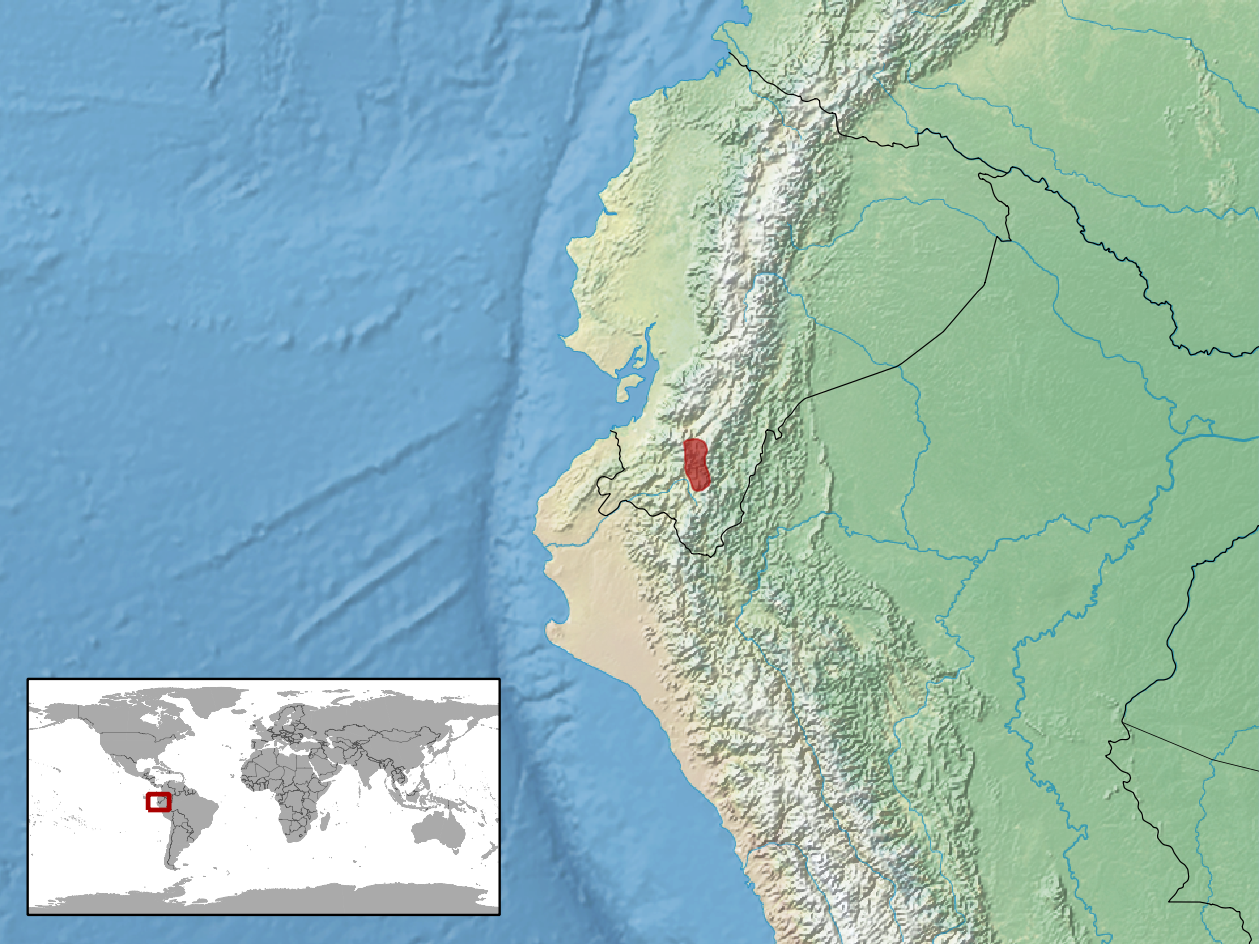

Synonyms
- Bothrops lojana Parker, 1930; Bothrops alticola Parker 1939; Bothriopsis alticola — Welch, 1994; Bothrops lojanus — Welch, 1994; Bothrocophias lojanus — Hamdan et al., 2019; Carrasco et al., 2023

Species of snake

Bothrocophias lojanus, also known commonly as the Lojan lancehead in English, and macanchi or macaucho in Spanish, is a species of venomous pit viper in the subfamily Crotalinae of the family Viperidae. The species is native to northwestern South America.

== Geographic range ==
B. lojanus is found in Ecuador and Peru.

== Habitat ==
The preferred natural habitat of B. lojanus is forest at altitudes of 1,900–3,678 m (6,234–12,067 ft).

== Diet ==
B. lojanus preys upon lizards and small rodents.

== Reproduction ==
B. lojanus is viviparous.
