= Lygophis vanzolinii =

Conservation status
- Near Threatened (IUCN 3.1)

Scientific classification
- Kingdom: Animalia
- Phylum: Chordata
- Class: Reptilia
- Order: Squamata
- Suborder: Serpentes
- Family: Colubridae
- Genus: Lygophis
- Species: L. vanzolinii

Binomial name
- Lygophis vanzolinii (Dixon, 1985)

Species of snake

Lygophis vanzolinii, Vanzolini's ground snake, is a species of snake in the family Colubridae. The species is native to Argentina.
