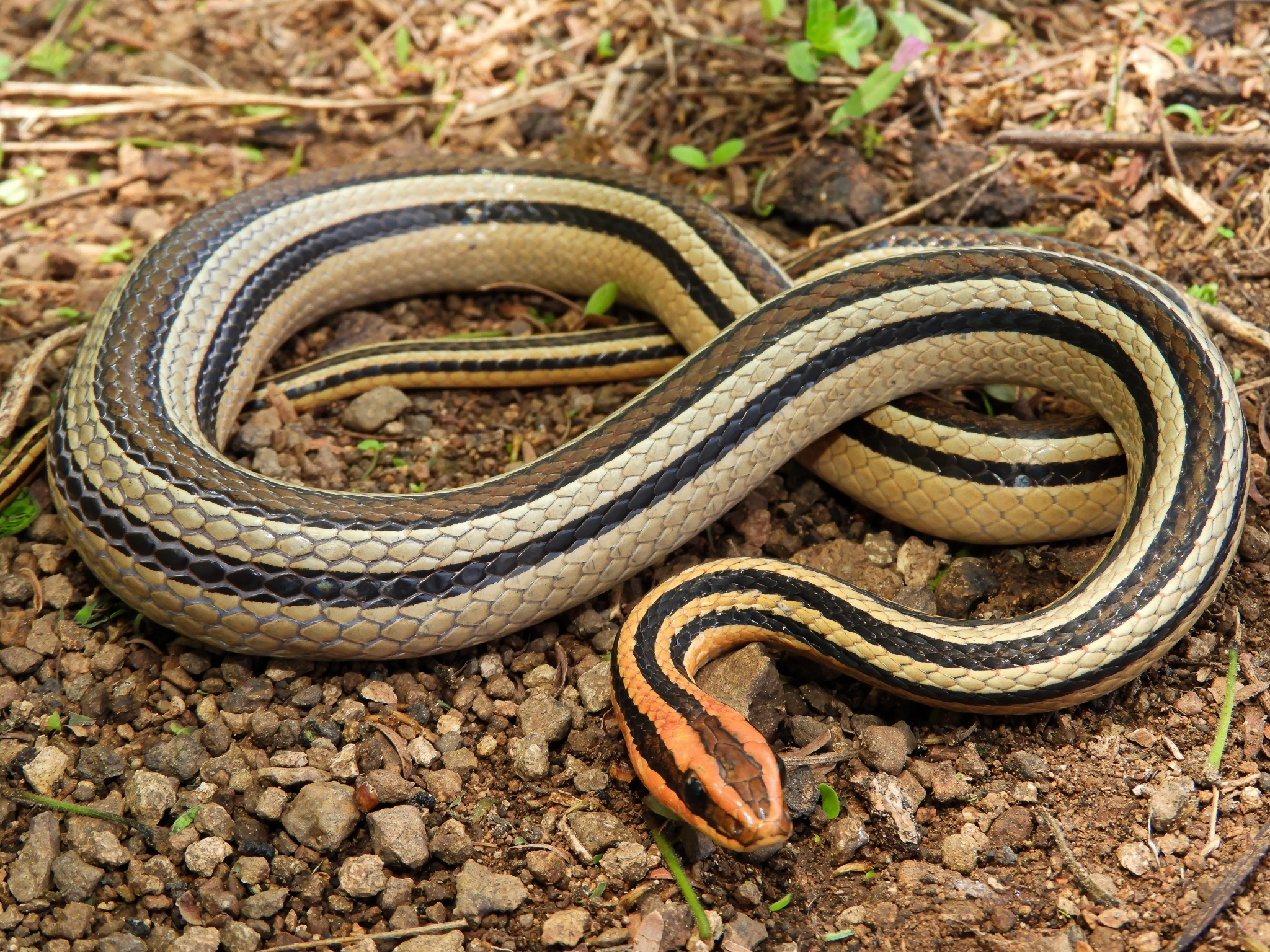
- Lygophis lineatus

Scientific classification
- Kingdom: Animalia
- Phylum: Chordata
- Class: Reptilia
- Order: Squamata
- Suborder: Serpentes
- Family: Colubridae
- Subfamily: Dipsadinae
- Genus: Lygophis; Fitzinger, 1843

= Lygophis =

Genus of snakes

Lygophis is a genus of snakes in the subfamily Dipsadinae of the family Colubridae. The genus is endemic to Panama and South America.

== Species ==
The genus Lygophis contains the following eight species which are recognized as being valid.

- Lygophis anomalus (Günther, 1858)
- Lygophis dilepis Cope, 1862 - Lema's ground snake, Lema’s striped snake
- Lygophis elegantissimus (Koslowsky, 1896)
- Lygophis flavifrenatus Cope, 1862 - fronted ground snake
- Lygophis lineatus (Linnaeus, 1758) - lined ground snake
- Lygophis meridionalis (Schenkel, 1902)
- Lygophis paucidens Hoge, 1953 - Hoge's ground snake
- Lygophis vanzolinii (Dixon, 1985) - Vanzolini's ground snake

Nota bene: A binomial authority in parentheses indicates that the species was originally described in a genus other than Lygophis.
