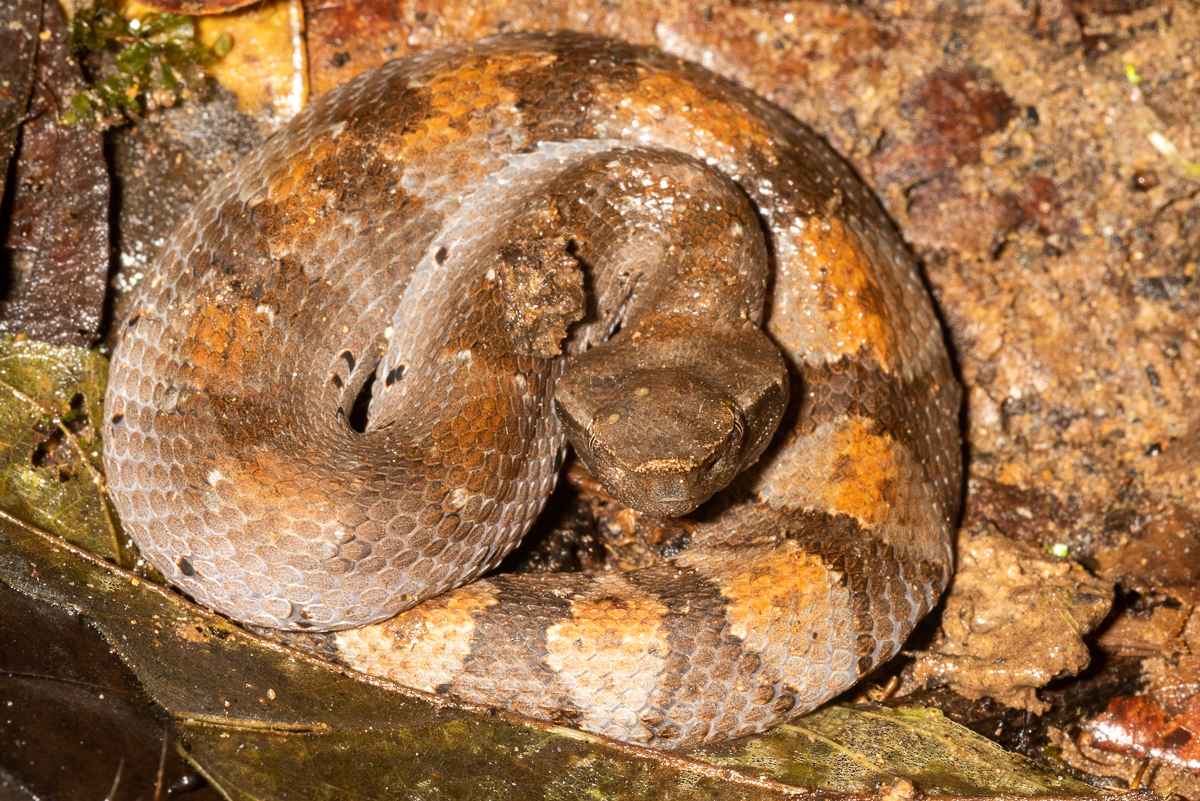
- Bothrocophias hyoprora

Scientific classification
- Kingdom: Animalia
- Phylum: Chordata
- Class: Reptilia
- Order: Squamata
- Suborder: Serpentes
- Family: Viperidae
- Subfamily: Crotalinae
- Genus: Bothrocophias; Gutberlet & Campbell, 2001

= Bothrocophias =

Genus of snakes

Bothrocophias is a genus of pit vipers in the subfamily Crotalinae of the family Viperidae, known by the common name toadheaded pit vipers. The genus is endemic to South America.

== Taxonomy ==
Bothrocophias is a relatively recently identified genus that consists of four to nine species, most of which were traditionally placed in Bothrops.

== Oviparity ==
Recent evidence published by Campbell and Lamar (1989, 2004) suggests that Bothrocophias colombianus may lay eggs rather than give birth to live young. This would make it almost unique among New World pitvipers (but not Asian species). The only other American pitvipers known to lay eggs are the four species of bushmaster (Lachesis).

== Species ==
The following nine species are recognized as being valid.

Image	Species	Common name	Geographic range
	Bothrocophias andianus (Amaral, 1923)		Bolivia and Peru
	Bothrocophias campbelli (Freire-Lascano, 1991)	Campbell's toadheaded viper the Ecuadorian toadheaded pitviper víbora boca de sapo	Ecuador
	Bothrocophias colombianus (Rendahl & Vestergren, 1940)	Colombian toad-headed pitviper	Colombia
	Bothrocophias hyoprora (Amaral, 1935)	Amazonian toad-headed pitviper	Ecuador, Colombia, Brazil, Peru, and Bolivia
	Bothrocophias lojanus (Parker, 1930)	Lojan lancehead macanchi macaucho	Ecuador, Peru
	Bothrocophias microphthalmus (Cope, 1876)	small-eyed toad-headed pit viper	Ecuador, Peru, Bolivia, Colombia and Brazil
	Bothrocophias myersi (Gutberlet & Campbell, 2001)	Myers toadheaded pitviper	Colombia
	Bothrocophias myrringae Angarita-Sierra, Cubides-Cubillos, & Hurtado-Gómez, 2022	High-Andean Toad-Headed Pitviper	Colombia
	Bothrocophias tulitoi Angarita-Sierra, Cubides-Cubillos, & Hurtado-Gómez, 2022		Colombia

Nota bene: A binomial authority in parentheses indicates that the species was originally described in a genus other than Bothrocophias.
