= Lygophis meridionalis =

Conservation status
- Least Concern (IUCN 3.1)

Scientific classification
- Kingdom: Animalia
- Phylum: Chordata
- Class: Reptilia
- Order: Squamata
- Suborder: Serpentes
- Family: Colubridae
- Genus: Lygophis
- Species: L. meridionalis

Binomial name
- Lygophis meridionalis (Schenkel, 1902)

Species of snake

Lygophis meridionalis is a species of snake in the family Colubridae. The species is native to Brazil, Bolivia, and Argentina.
