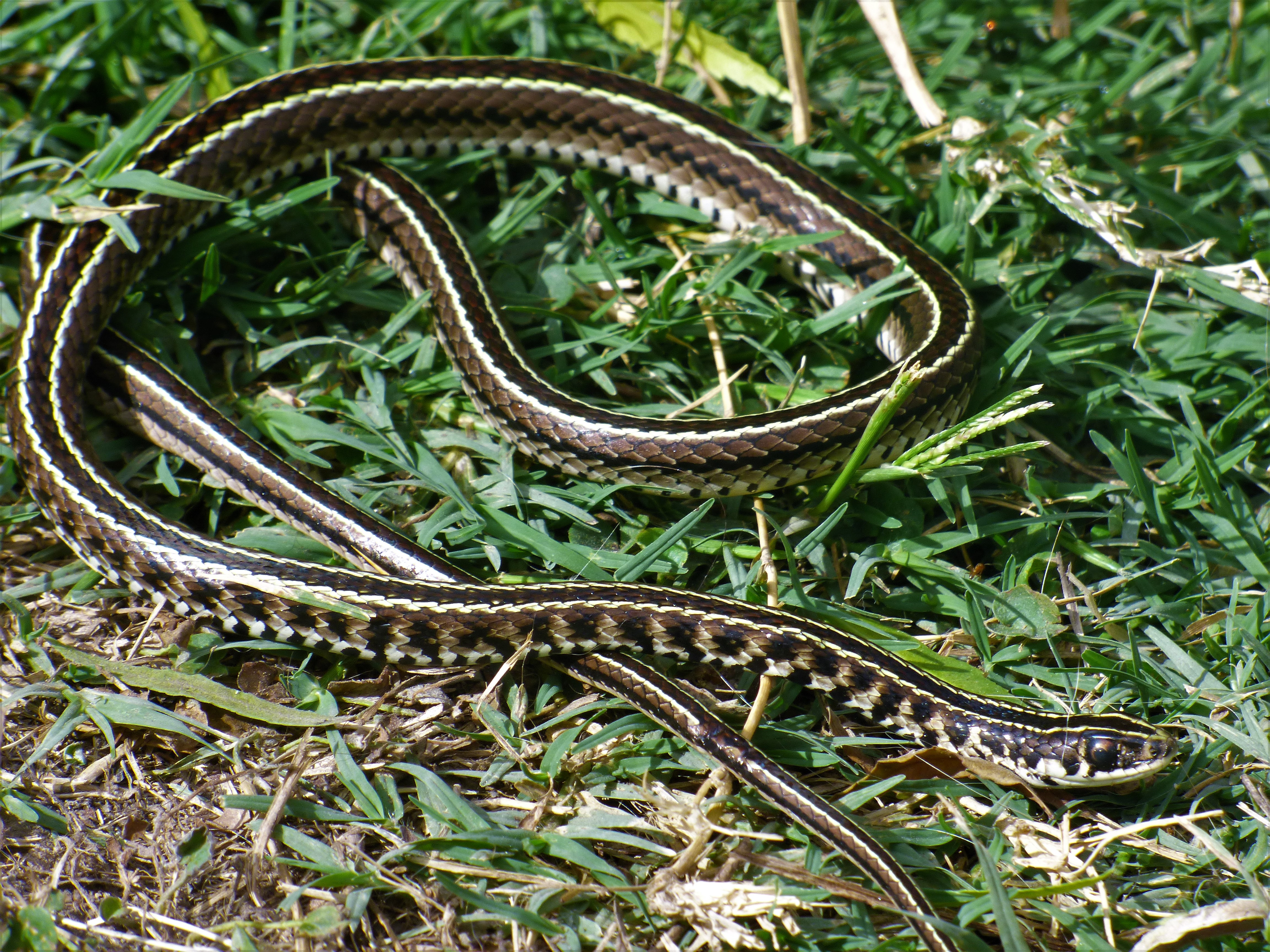

Conservation status
- Least Concern (IUCN 3.1)

Scientific classification
- Kingdom: Animalia
- Phylum: Chordata
- Class: Reptilia
- Order: Squamata
- Suborder: Serpentes
- Family: Colubridae
- Genus: Lygophis
- Species: L. flavifrenatus

Binomial name
- Lygophis flavifrenatus Cope, 1862

= Lygophis flavifrenatus =

Species of snake

Lygophis flavifrenatus, the fronted ground snake, is a species of snake in the family Colubridae. The species is native to Brazil, Uruguay, Paraguay, and Argentina.
