= Bothrops taeniatus lichenosus =

Scientific classification
- Kingdom: Animalia
- Phylum: Chordata
- Class: Reptilia
- Order: Squamata
- Suborder: Serpentes
- Family: Viperidae
- Genus: Bothrops
- Species: B. taeniatus
- Subspecies: B. t. lichenosus

Trinomial name
- Bothrops taeniatus lichenosus (Roze, 1958)

Synonyms
- Bothrops lichenosa Roze, 1958; Bothrops lichenosus – Roze, 1966; Bothrops castelnaudi lichenosus – Hoge & Romano-Hoge, 1981; B[othriechis]. t[aeniata]. lichenosa – Campbell & Lamar, 1989; Bothriechis taeniatus lichenosus – Golay et al., 1993

Subspecies of snake

Common names: (none).

Bothrops taeniatus lichenosus is a venomous pitviper subspecies endemic to South America and known only from one locality in Bolívar State, Venezuela.

== Description ==
Same as for B. t. taeniatus, except that B. t. lichenosus has fewer ventral scales and fewer subcaudal scales.

== Geographic range ==
It is found in South America and known only from the type locality, which is "Chimantá Tepui, Estado Bolívar, Venezuela".
