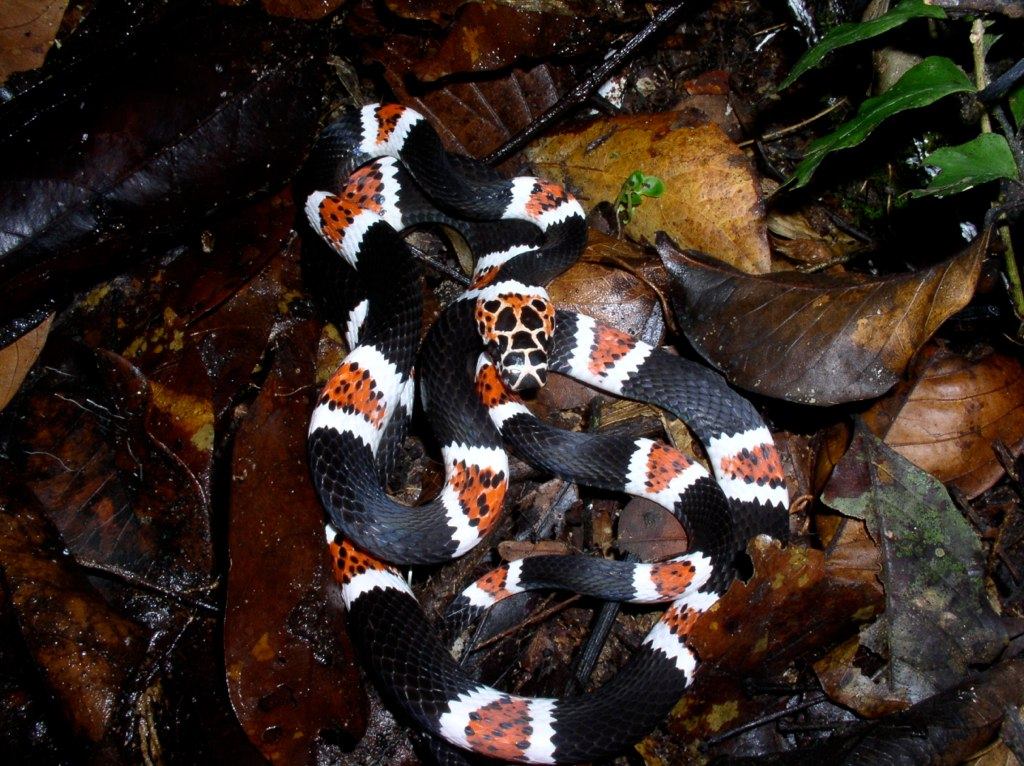
- Rhinobothryum lentiginosum

Scientific classification
- Kingdom: Animalia
- Phylum: Chordata
- Class: Reptilia
- Order: Squamata
- Suborder: Serpentes
- Family: Colubridae
- Subfamily: Colubrinae
- Genus: Rhinobothryum; Wagler, 1830

= Rhinobothryum =

Genus of snakes

Rhinobothryum is a genus of snakes in the family Colubridae.

== Geographic range ==
The genus Rhinobothryum is endemic to Central America and South America.

== Species ==
Two species are recognized as being valid.

- Rhinobothryum bovallii Andersson, 1916
- Rhinobothryum lentiginosum (Scopoli, 1785) - Amazon banded snake
