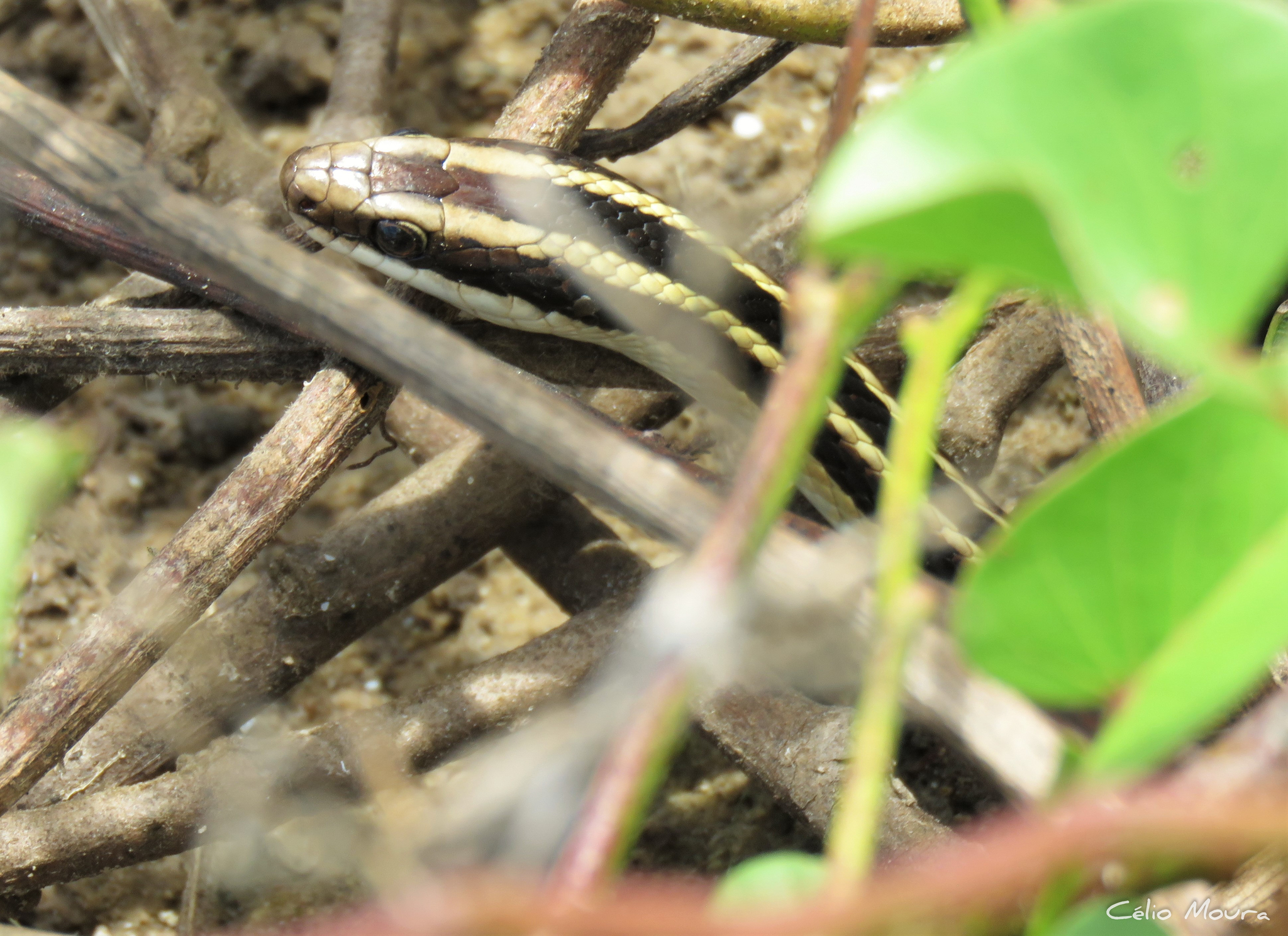

Conservation status
- Least Concern (IUCN 3.1)

Scientific classification
- Kingdom: Animalia
- Phylum: Chordata
- Class: Reptilia
- Order: Squamata
- Suborder: Serpentes
- Family: Colubridae
- Genus: Lygophis
- Species: L. dilepis

Binomial name
- Lygophis dilepis Cope, 1862

= Lygophis dilepis =

Species of snake

Lygophis dilepis, Lema's ground snake or Lema's striped snake, is a species of snake in the family Colubridae. The species is native to Brazil, Bolivia, Paraguay, and Argentina.
