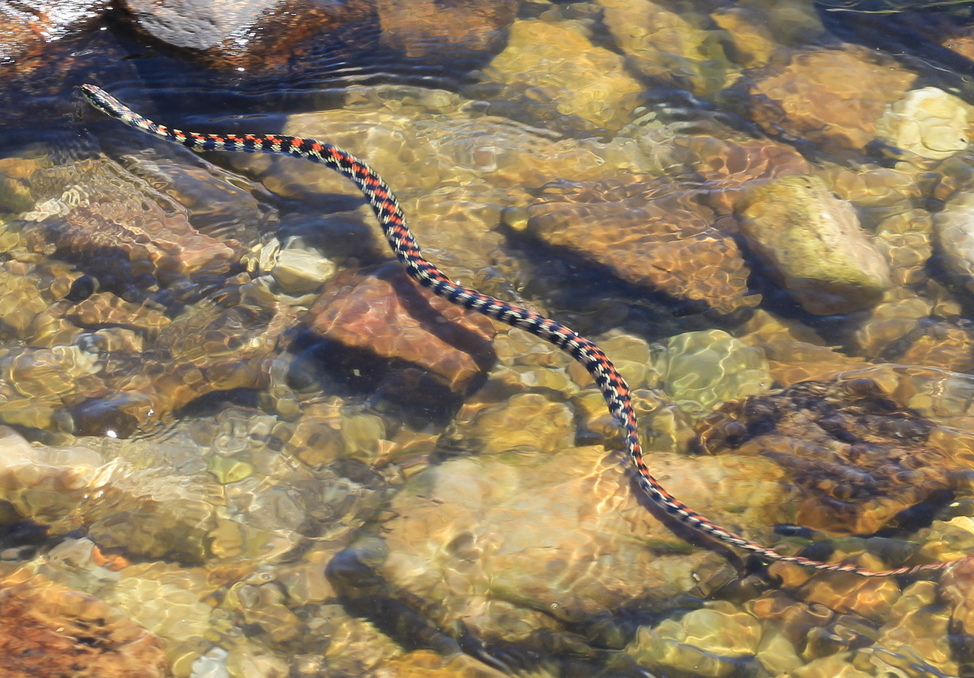

Conservation status
- Vulnerable (IUCN 3.1)

Scientific classification
- Kingdom: Animalia
- Phylum: Chordata
- Class: Reptilia
- Order: Squamata
- Suborder: Serpentes
- Family: Colubridae
- Genus: Lygophis
- Species: L. elegantissimus

Binomial name
- Lygophis elegantissimus (Koslowsky, 1896)

= Lygophis elegantissimus =

Species of snake

Lygophis elegantissimus is a species of snake in the family Colubridae. The species is native to Argentina.
