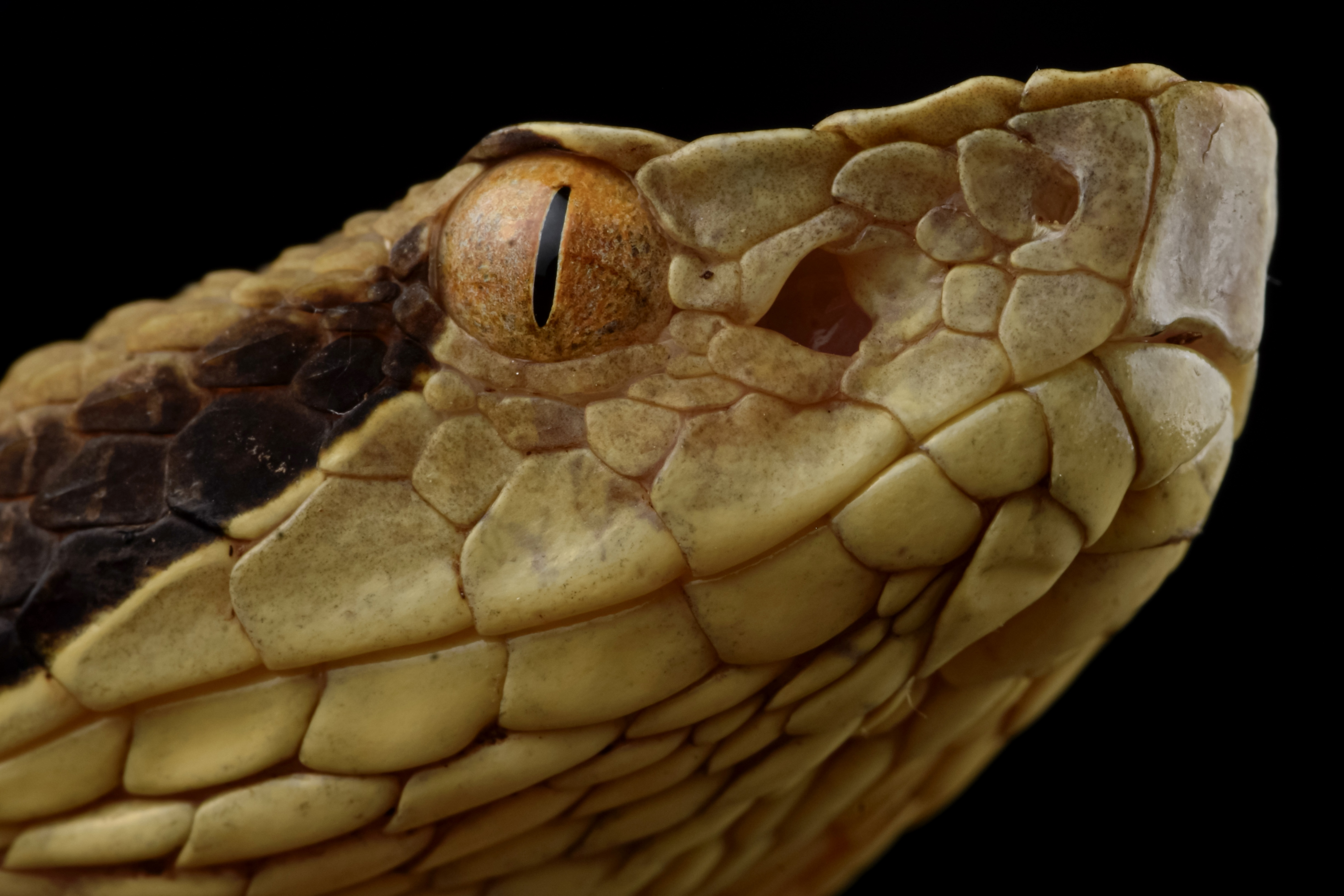
- Bothrocophias andianus head close-up

Scientific classification
- Kingdom: Animalia
- Phylum: Chordata
- Class: Reptilia
- Order: Squamata
- Suborder: Serpentes
- Family: Viperidae
- Genus: Bothrocophias
- Species: B. andianus

Binomial name
- Bothrocophias andianus Amaral, 1923

Synonyms
- Bothrops andiana Amaral, 1923; Bothrops andianus — Klemmer, 1963; Bothrocophias andianus — Carrasco et al., 2012

= Bothrocophias andianus =

Species of snake

Common names: Andean lancehead.

Bothrocophias andianus is a venomous pit viper species endemic to the Andes in South America. No subspecies are currently recognized.

== Description ==
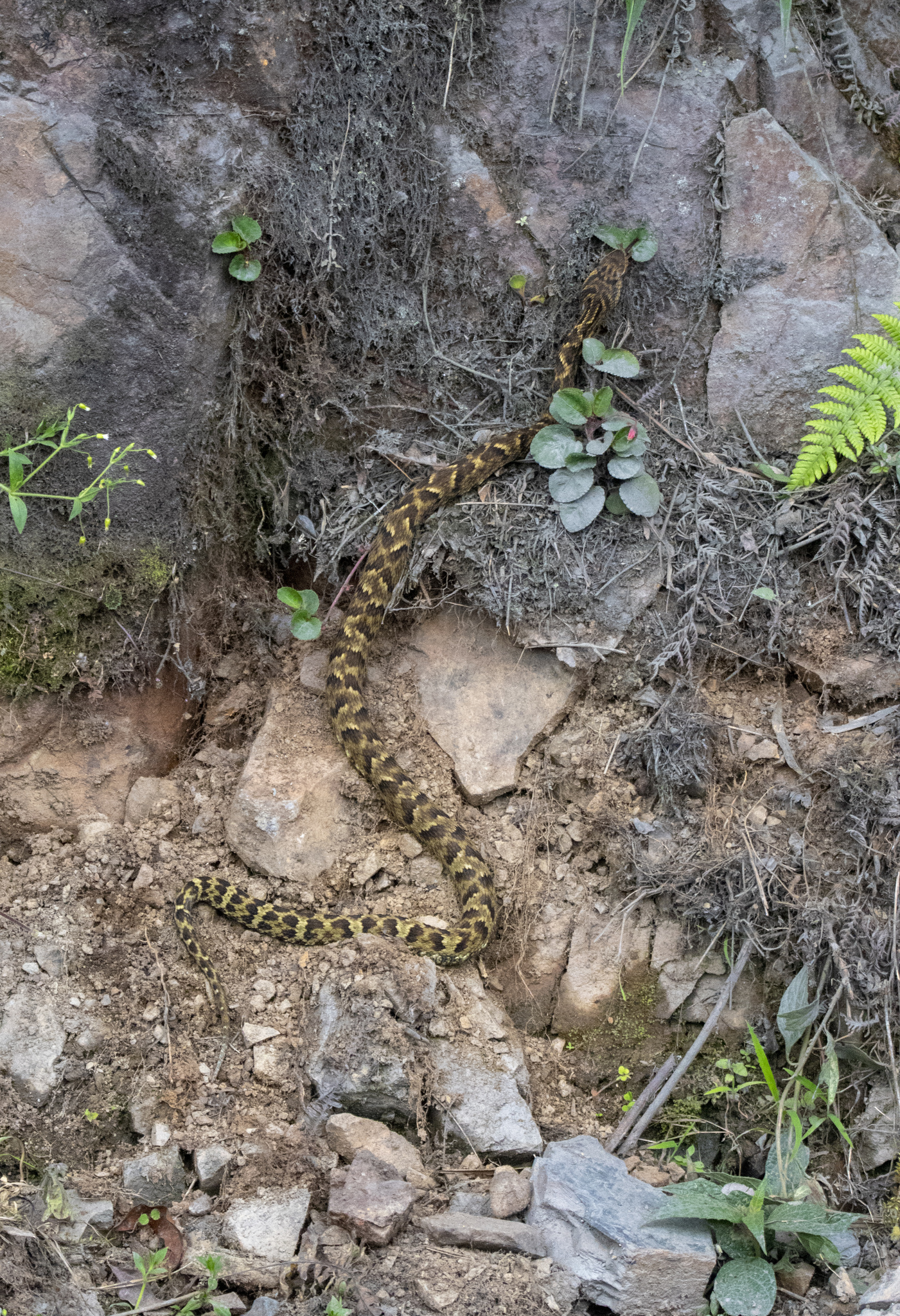
Bothrocophias andianus in Peru

A terrestrial species, adults usually grow to 60–70 cm (about 24-28 inches) in total length with a maximum of 125.8 cm (49.5 in).

The scalation includes 21-25 (usually 21-23) rows of dorsal scales at midbody, 157-174/169-179 ventral scales in males/females and 52-63/49-58 mostly divided subcaudal scales. On the head, the rostral scale is usually a little higher (up to 50%) than it is wide, the loreal scale is rectangular and wider than it is high, there are 3-10 keeled intersupraoculars, 7 supralabial scales with the second usually fused with the prelacunal to form a lacunolabial, and 8-11 sublabial scales.

The color pattern consists of an olive gray to brown ground color, which is occasionally darker anteriorly, overlaid with a series of 18-25 dark dorsolateral blotches that usually oppose middorsally, but may alternate. These markings are triangular, or in the shape of a headphone, and have black edges followed by a peripheral pale border. The belly is cream to yellow with heavy dark gray, brown or black mottling. On the head, the canthus and supralabials are a lighter than the overall ground color while the dorsum is darker. A well-defined postorbital stripe is present that is dark chocolate brown or black in color.

== Geographic range ==
Found in South America in the southern mountains of Peru in the departments of Cuzco and Puno at elevations of 1,800–3,300 m (5,900–10,800 ft). The type locality given is "Machu Picchu, Department of Cuzco, Peru, about 9,000-10,000 ft. altitude" (2,743-3,048 m).
