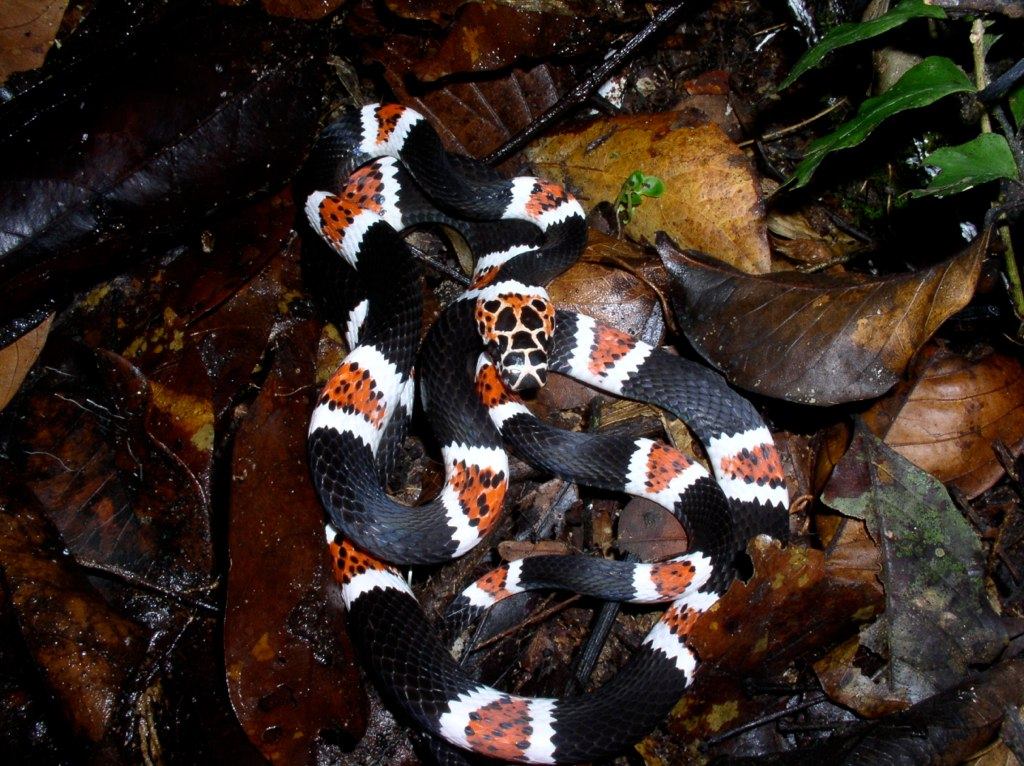

Conservation status
- Least Concern (IUCN 3.1)

Scientific classification
- Kingdom: Animalia
- Phylum: Chordata
- Class: Reptilia
- Order: Squamata
- Suborder: Serpentes
- Family: Colubridae
- Genus: Rhinobothryum
- Species: R. lentiginosum

Binomial name
- Rhinobothryum lentiginosum (Scopoli, 1785)

Synonyms
- Coluber lentiginosus Scopoli, 1785; Coluber macrorhinus Wagler, 1830; Rhinobothryum lentiginosum — A.M.C. Duméril, Bibron & A.H.A. Duméril, 1854

= Rhinobothryum lentiginosum =

Species of snake

Rhinobothryum lentiginosum, commonly known as the Amazon banded snake, is a species of snake in the family Colubridae. The species is endemic to South America.

== Geographic range ==
R. lentiginosum is found in Bolivia, Brazil, Colombia, Ecuador, French Guiana, Guyana, Paraguay, Peru, and Venezuela.
