= Bothrocophias tulitoi =

Scientific classification
- Kingdom: Animalia
- Phylum: Chordata
- Class: Reptilia
- Order: Squamata
- Suborder: Serpentes
- Family: Viperidae
- Genus: Bothrocophias
- Species: B. tulitoi

Binomial name
- Bothrocophias tulitoi Angarita-Sierra, Cubides-Cubillos, & Hurtado-Gómez, 2022

Species of snake

Bothrocophias tulitoi is a species of venomous pit viper found in Colombia. It is named in honour of Professor Tulio Manuel Angarita Serrano, father of Angarita-Sierra and advocate for rights in education in Colombia, known as Tulito by his colleagues, friends, and relatives.

== Description ==
Bothrocophias tulitoi can be distinguished by its specific scale counts, 27 or less dark brown bands and/or blotches with pale centers as well as its bright red or orange speckles and black spots on its tail. It also displays a creamy white or pale yellow underbelly, with darkly pigmented edges and spots on the sides turning heavily mottled with dark brown pigment toward the darkly pigmented tail.

B. tulitoi exhibits sexual dimorphism. This is displayed in their specific scale counts as well as their colouring - with males displaying more melanism while females display more cream-coloured head markings.

B. tulitoi also changes depending on its age - neonates and juveniles display pale yellow underbellies with conspicuous banded markings, these markings fade towards the head in adult specimens.

== Venom ==
Bites from Bothrocophias tulitoi may cause symptoms such as oedema, pain, erythema, ecchymosis, paresthesia, phlyctens, paresthesia, bruises, sickness, vomiting, vertigo, bradycardia, gingivorrhea, muscular weakness, hematuria, hypotension, abdominal pain and altered vision.
