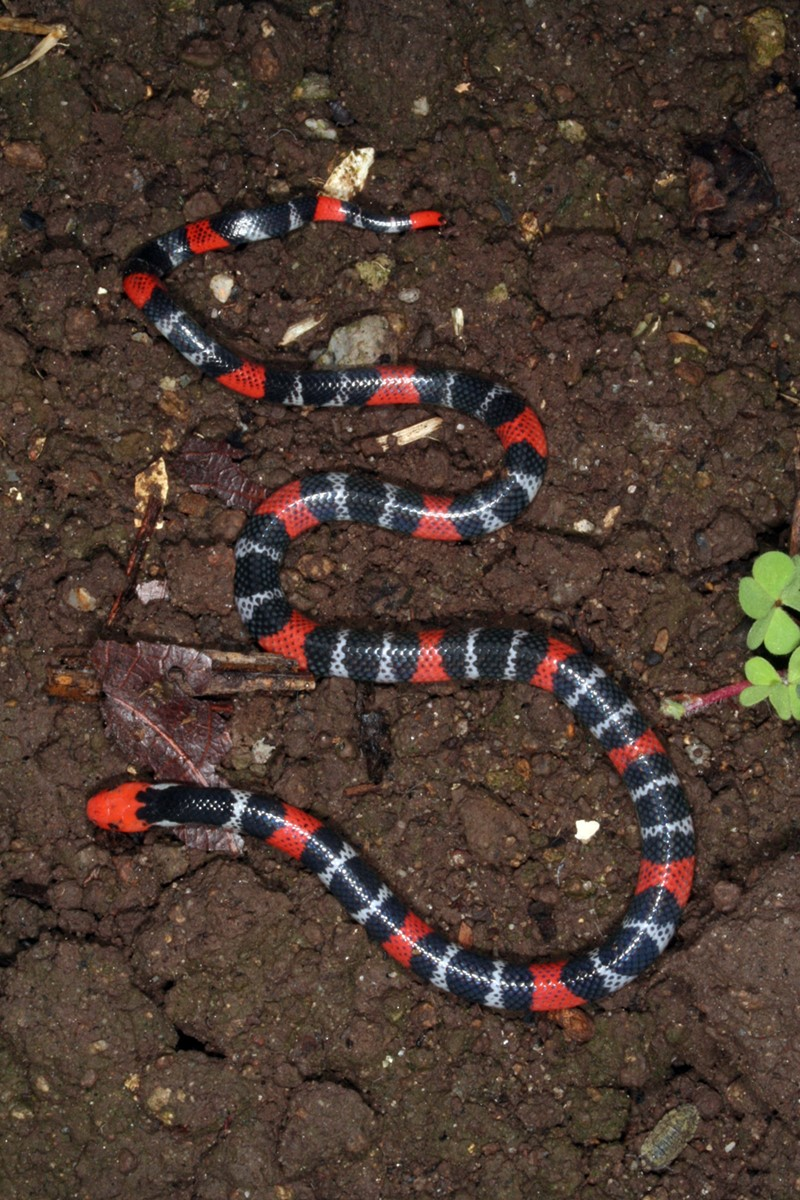

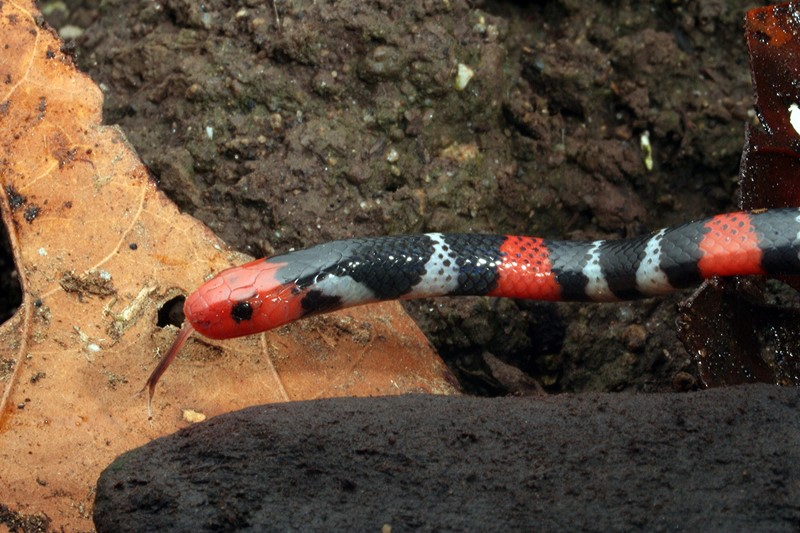

Conservation status
- Least Concern (IUCN 3.1)

Scientific classification
- Kingdom: Animalia
- Phylum: Chordata
- Class: Reptilia
- Order: Squamata
- Suborder: Serpentes
- Family: Elapidae
- Genus: Micrurus
- Species: M. ancoralis

Binomial name
- Micrurus ancoralis (Jan, 1872)
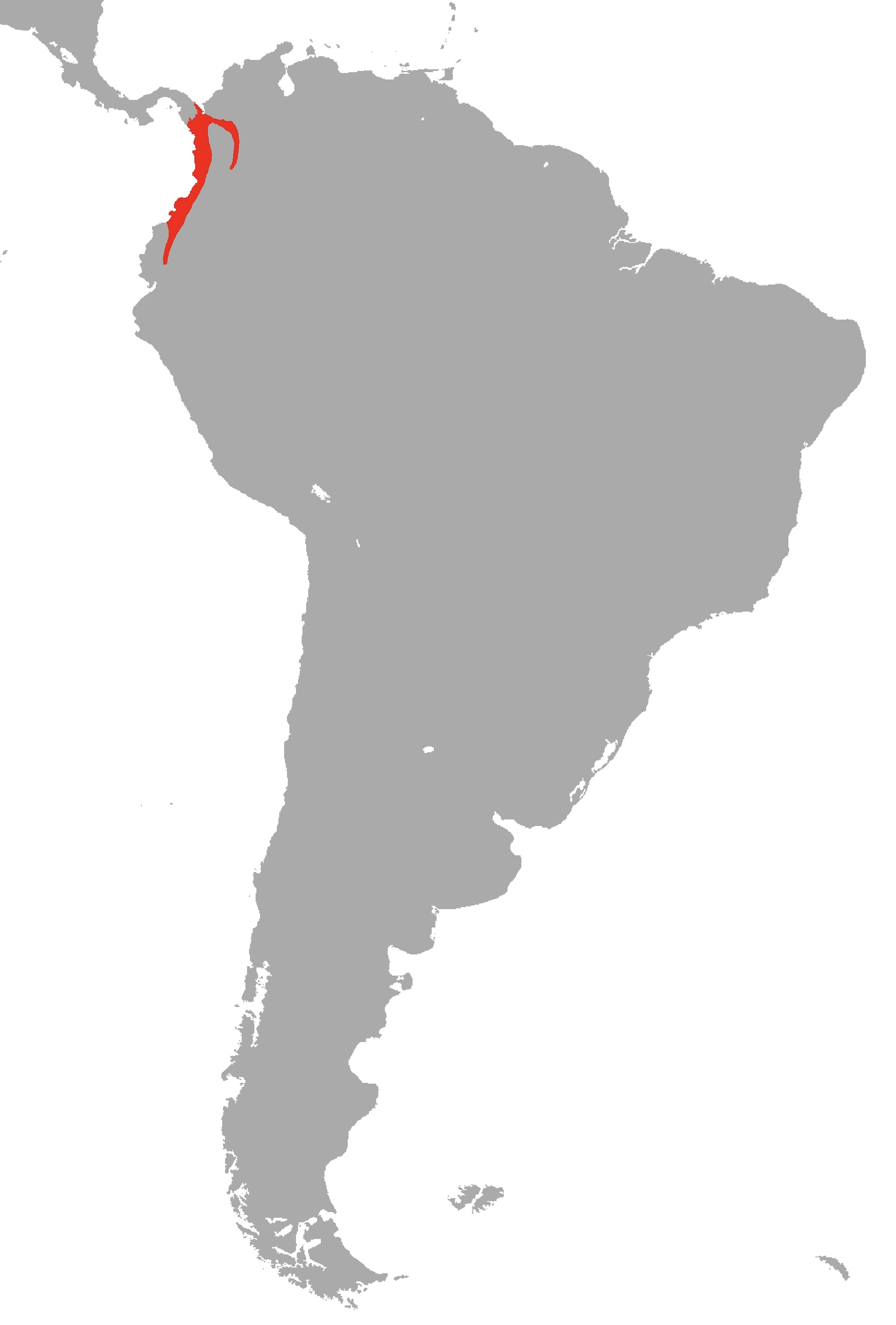

Synonyms
- Elaps Marcgravi var. ancoralis Jan, 1872; Elaps ancoralis Jan, 1872; Elaps rosenbergi Boulenger, 1898

= Micrurus ancoralis =

Species of snake

Micrurus ancoralis, also known commonly as the anchor coral snake and the regal coral snake, is a species of venomous snake in the family Elapidae. The species is native to extreme southeastern Central America and adjacent northwestern South America. There are two recognized subspecies.

== Description ==
Dorsally, Micrurus ancoralis has a red head, followed by a black anchor-shaped marking on the neck. The body color pattern consists of black, white, and red rings. The black rings are in triads enclosing white rings, and the triads are separated by red rings.

The ventrals number 248–266 in males and 271–290 in females.

Long and heavy-bodied for its genus, as an adult M. ancoralis is usually 0.90 m (3.0 ft) in total length (tail included), but the maximum recorded total length is 1.486 m (4.88 ft).

== Geographic distribution ==
Micrurus ancoralis is found in southeastern Panama, western Colombia, and western Ecuador.

== Habitat ==
The preferred natural habitat of Micrurus ancoralis is forest, at elevations from sea level to 1,500 m (4,900 ft), but it has also been found in artificial habitats such as banana plantations.

== Behavior ==
Micrurus ancoralis is terrestrial and semifossorial.

== Diet ==
Micrurus ancoralis preys on amphisbaenians, such as Amphisbaena fuliginosa, and small snakes, such as Ninia atrata.

== Reproduction ==
Micrurus ancoralis is oviparous.

== Subspecies ==
Two subspecies are recognized as being valid, including the nominotypical subspecies.

- Micrurus ancoralis ancoralis (Jan, 1872)
- Micrurus ancoralis jani Schmidt, 1936

Nota bene: A trinomial authority in parentheses indicates that the subspecies was originally described in a genus other than Micrurus.

== Etymology ==
The subspecific name, jani, is in honor of Italian herpetologist Giorgio Jan.
