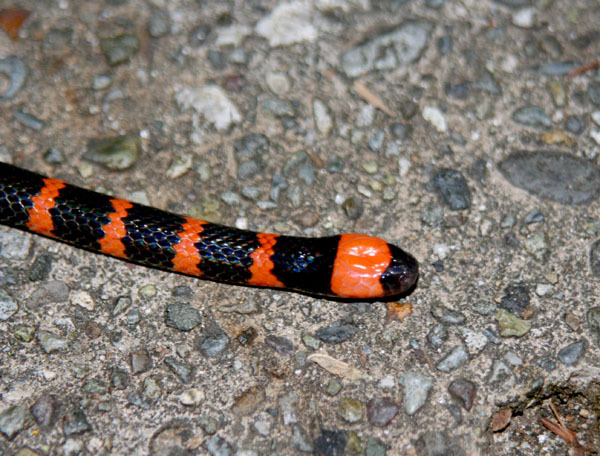
- Micrurus multifasciatus in Panama

Conservation status
- Least Concern (IUCN 3.1)

Scientific classification
- Kingdom: Animalia
- Phylum: Chordata
- Class: Reptilia
- Order: Squamata
- Suborder: Serpentes
- Family: Elapidae
- Genus: Micrurus
- Species: M. multifasciatus

Binomial name
- Micrurus multifasciatus (Jan, 1858)
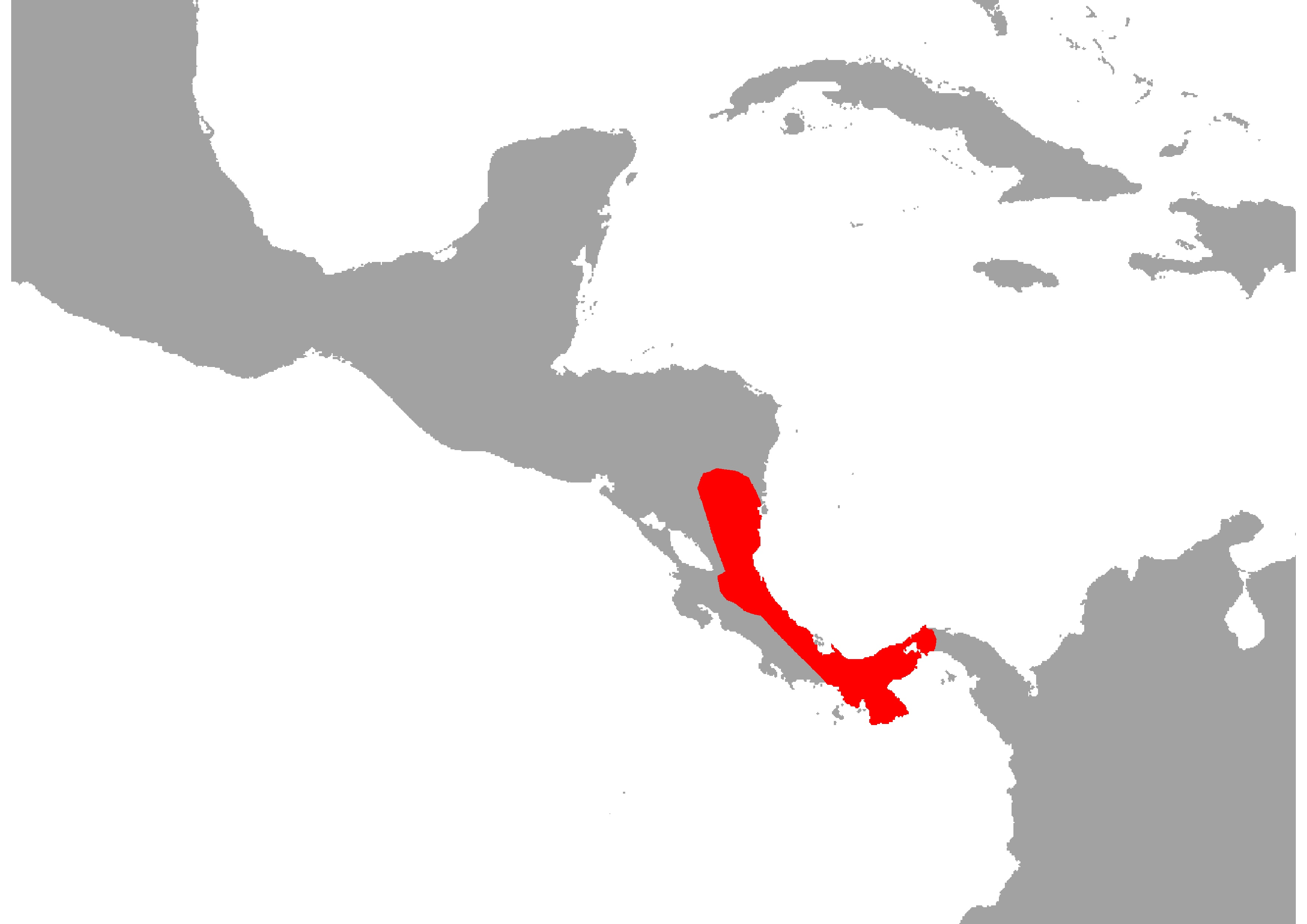

Synonyms
- Elaps multifasciatus Jan, 1858; Micrurus mipartitus multifasciatus (Jan. 1858)

= Micrurus multifasciatus =

Species of snake

Micrurus multifasciatus, also known commonly as the gargantilla and the many-banded coral snake, is a species of venomous snake in the family Elapidae. The species is native to Central America and northwestern South America. There are two recognized subspecies.

== Description ==
Micrurus multifasciatus is a medium to large species for its genus. Adults usually have a total length (tail included) of 50–80 cm (20–31 in). However, the maximum recorded total length is 113 cm (44 in).

Unusual for its genus, M. multifasciatus is bicolored. Its color pattern consists of alternating rings of only red and black, with no white or yellow being present. On the body, the red rings are narrower than the black rings; but on the tail, the red rings are wider than the black rings. There are 40–73 black rings on the body, and 2–5 black rings on the tail

== Geographic distribution ==
Micrurus multifasciatus is found in Colombia, Costa Rica, Nicaragua, and Panama.

== Habitat ==
The preferred natural habitat of Micrurus multifasciatus is forest, at elevations from near sea level to 1,600 m (5,200 ft).

== Behavior ==
Micrurus multifasciatus is terrestrial.

== Diet ==
Like other New World coral snakes, Micrurus multifasciatus preys on limbless poikilotherms such as caecilians and snakes.

== Reproduction ==
Micrurus multifasciatus is oviparous.

== Venom ==
When specimens of Micrurus multifasciatus were "milked" of their venom by a team of scientists at the Instituto Clodomiro Picado in Costa Rica, the average venom yield was 12 mg (dry weight). This amount is approximately twice the estimated lethal dose for an adult human, which the scientists estimated to be 5–7 mg.

== Subspecies ==
Two subspecies are recognized as being valid, including the nominotypical subspecies.

- Micrurus multifasciatus hertwigi (F. Werner, 1896) – Costa Rican gargantilla
- Micrurus multifasciatus multifasciatus (Jan, 1858) – Panama gargantilla

Nota bene: A trinomial authority in parentheses indicates that the subspecies was originally described in a genus other than Micrurus.
