= Saphenophis boursieri =

Conservation status
- Near Threatened (IUCN 3.1)

Scientific classification
- Kingdom: Animalia
- Phylum: Chordata
- Class: Reptilia
- Order: Squamata
- Suborder: Serpentes
- Family: Colubridae
- Genus: Saphenophis
- Species: S. boursieri

Binomial name
- Saphenophis boursieri (Jan, 1867)

Species of snake

Saphenophis boursieri is a species of snake in the family Colubridae. It is found in Colombia and Ecuador.
