= Saphenophis =

Scientific classification
- Kingdom: Animalia
- Phylum: Chordata
- Class: Reptilia
- Order: Squamata
- Suborder: Serpentes
- Family: Colubridae
- Subfamily: Dipsadinae
- Genus: Saphenophis; Myers, 1973

Genus of snakes

Saphenophis is a genus of snakes in the subfamily Dipsadinae of the family Colubridae. The genus is native to northwestern South America.

== Geographic range ==
Species in the genus Saphenophis are found in Colombia and Ecuador.

== Species ==
Five species are recognized as being valid.

- Saphenophis antioquiensis (Dunn, 1943) - Dunn's saphenophis snake
- Saphenophis atahuallpae (Steindachner, 1901) - Atahuallpa saphenophis snake
- Saphenophis boursieri (Jan, 1867)
- Saphenophis sneiderni Myers, 1973 - saphenophis snake
- Saphenophis tristriatus (Rendahl & Vestergren, 1941)

Nota bene: A binomial authority in parentheses indicates that the species was originally described in a genus other than Saphenophis.

== Etymology ==
The specific name, boursieri, is in honor of French ornithologist Jules Bourcier.

The specific name, sneiderni, is in honor of Swedish taxidermist Kjell von Sneidern (1910–2000), who collected natural history specimens in Colombia.
