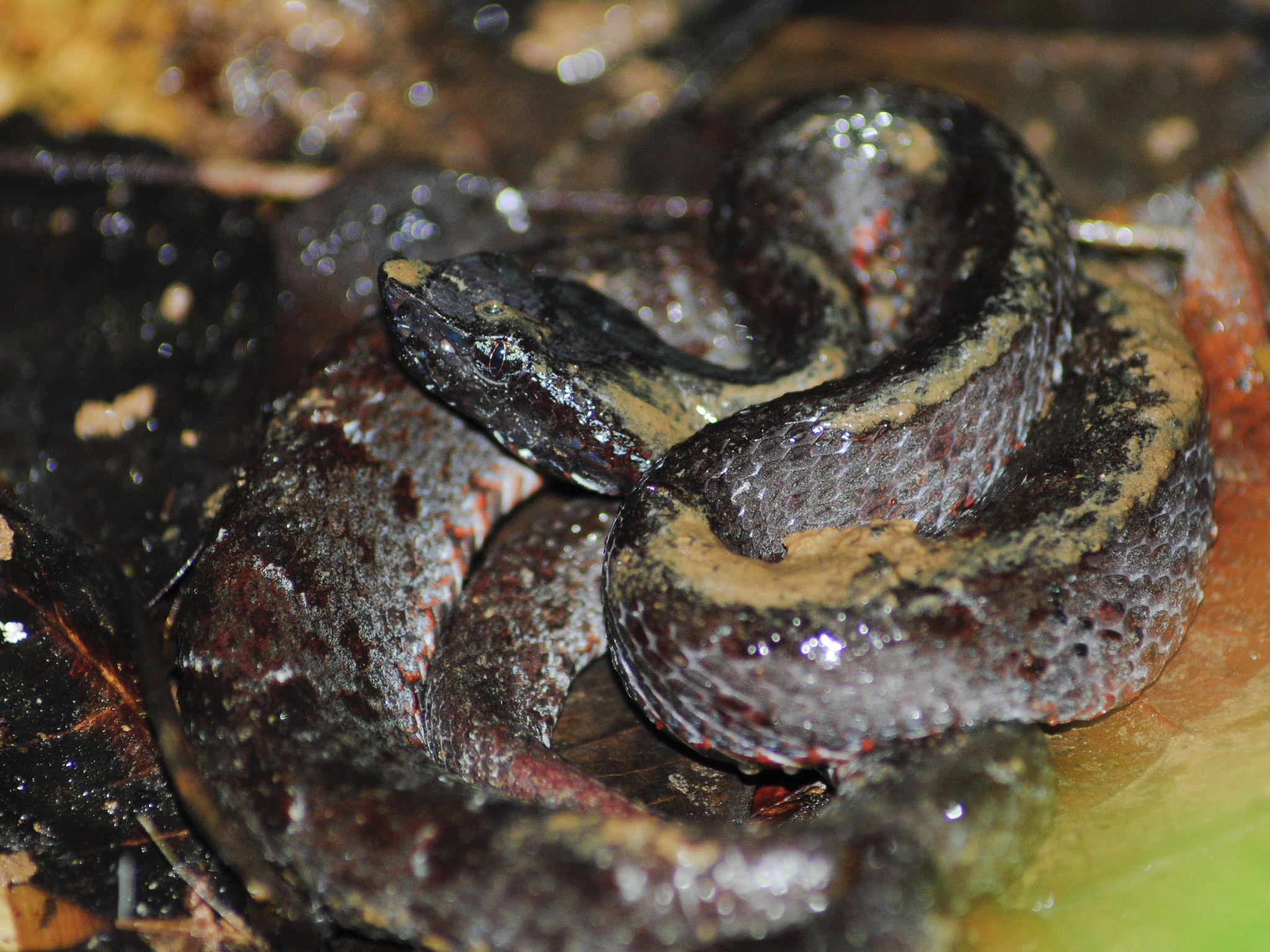

Conservation status
- Near Threatened (IUCN 3.1)

Scientific classification
- Kingdom: Animalia
- Phylum: Chordata
- Class: Reptilia
- Order: Squamata
- Suborder: Serpentes
- Family: Viperidae
- Genus: Bothrocophias
- Species: B. myersi

Binomial name
- Bothrocophias myersi Gutberlet & Campbell, 2001

= Bothrocophias myersi =

Species of snake

Bothrocophias myersi, commonly known as the cheeked snake, the Chocoan toadheaded pitviper, the Chocoan toad-headed viper, and the equis red snake, is a species of venomous pit viper in the subfamily Crotalinae of the family Viperidae. The species is endemic to Colombia.

== Geographic distribution ==
Bothrocophias myersi is present in the Pacific departments of Cauca and Valle del Cauca in Colombia. It occurs at elevations of 75–200 m (246–656 ft).

== Habitat ==
The preferred natural habitat of Bothrocophias myersi is forest.

== Behavior ==
Bothrocophias myersi is terrestrial.

== Reproduction ==
Bothrocophias myersi is ovoviviparous.

== Etymology ==
The specific name, myersi, is in honor of American herpetologist Charles William Myers.
