= Bothrocophias colombianus =

Scientific classification
- Kingdom: Animalia
- Phylum: Chordata
- Class: Reptilia
- Order: Squamata
- Suborder: Serpentes
- Family: Viperidae
- Genus: Bothrocophias
- Species: B. colombianus

Binomial name
- Bothrocophias colombianus Rendahl & Vestergren, 1940

Synonyms
- Bothrops microphthalmus colombianus Rendahl & Vestergren, 1940; Trimeresurus microphthalmus – Schmidt & Walker, 1943; Porthidium colombianum – Golay, et al., 1993; Bothrops colombianus – McDiarmid, Campbell & Touré, 1999; Bothrocophias colombianus – Campbell & Lamar, 2004

Species of snake

Bothrocophias colombianus, commonly known as the Colombian toad-headed pitviper, is a species of venomous snake in the family Viperidae. It is endemic to South America.

== Geographic range ==
It is found in western Colombia in the departments of Antioquia and Cauca.

== Description ==
In coloration and pattern Bothrocophias colombianus closely resembles its North American "cousin" Agkistrodon contortrix mokasen, commonly known as the northern copperhead.
