= Saphenophis antioquiensis =

Conservation status
- Data Deficient (IUCN 3.1)

Scientific classification
- Kingdom: Animalia
- Phylum: Chordata
- Class: Reptilia
- Order: Squamata
- Suborder: Serpentes
- Family: Colubridae
- Genus: Saphenophis
- Species: S. antioquiensis

Binomial name
- Saphenophis antioquiensis (Dunn, 1943)

Species of snake

Saphenophis antioquiensis, Dunn's saphenophis snake, is a species of snake in the family Colubridae. It is found in Colombia.
