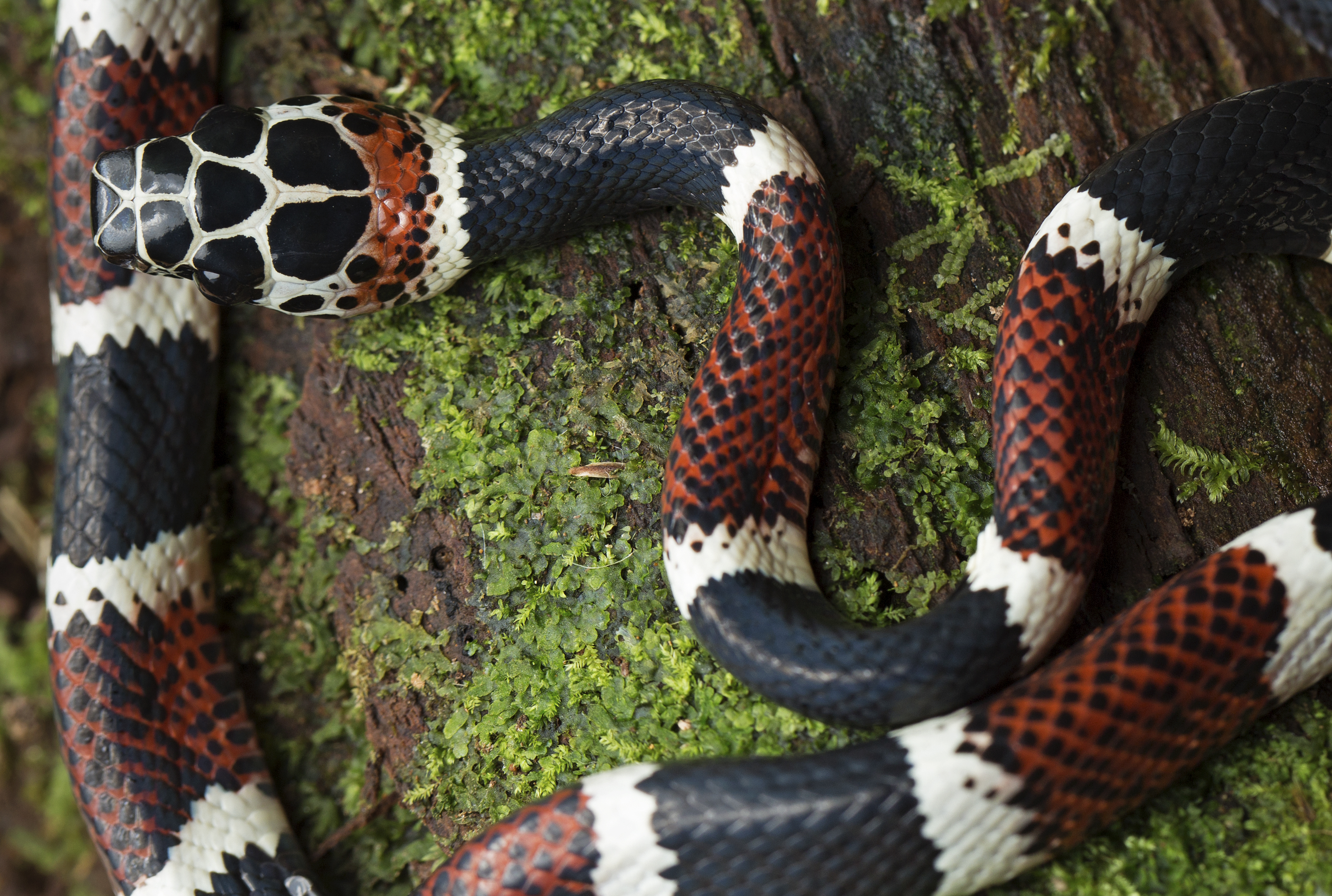

Conservation status
- Least Concern (IUCN 3.1)

Scientific classification
- Kingdom: Animalia
- Phylum: Chordata
- Class: Reptilia
- Order: Squamata
- Suborder: Serpentes
- Family: Colubridae
- Genus: Rhinobothryum
- Species: R. bovallii

Binomial name
- Rhinobothryum bovallii (Andersson, 1916)

Synonyms
- Rhinobothrium [sic] bovallii Andersson, 1916; Rhinobothryum [sic] bovalli — J. Peters, 1960

= Rhinobothryum bovallii =

Species of snake

Rhinobothryum bovallii, commonly known as the coral mimic snake or the false tree coral, is a species of snake in the family Colubridae. The species is native to Central America and northwestern South America.

== Etymology ==
The specific name, bovallii, is in honor of Swedish biologist Carl Bovallius.

== Geographic range ==
R. bovallii is found in Honduras, Nicaragua, Costa Rica, Panama, Colombia, Venezuela, and Ecuador.

== Habitat ==
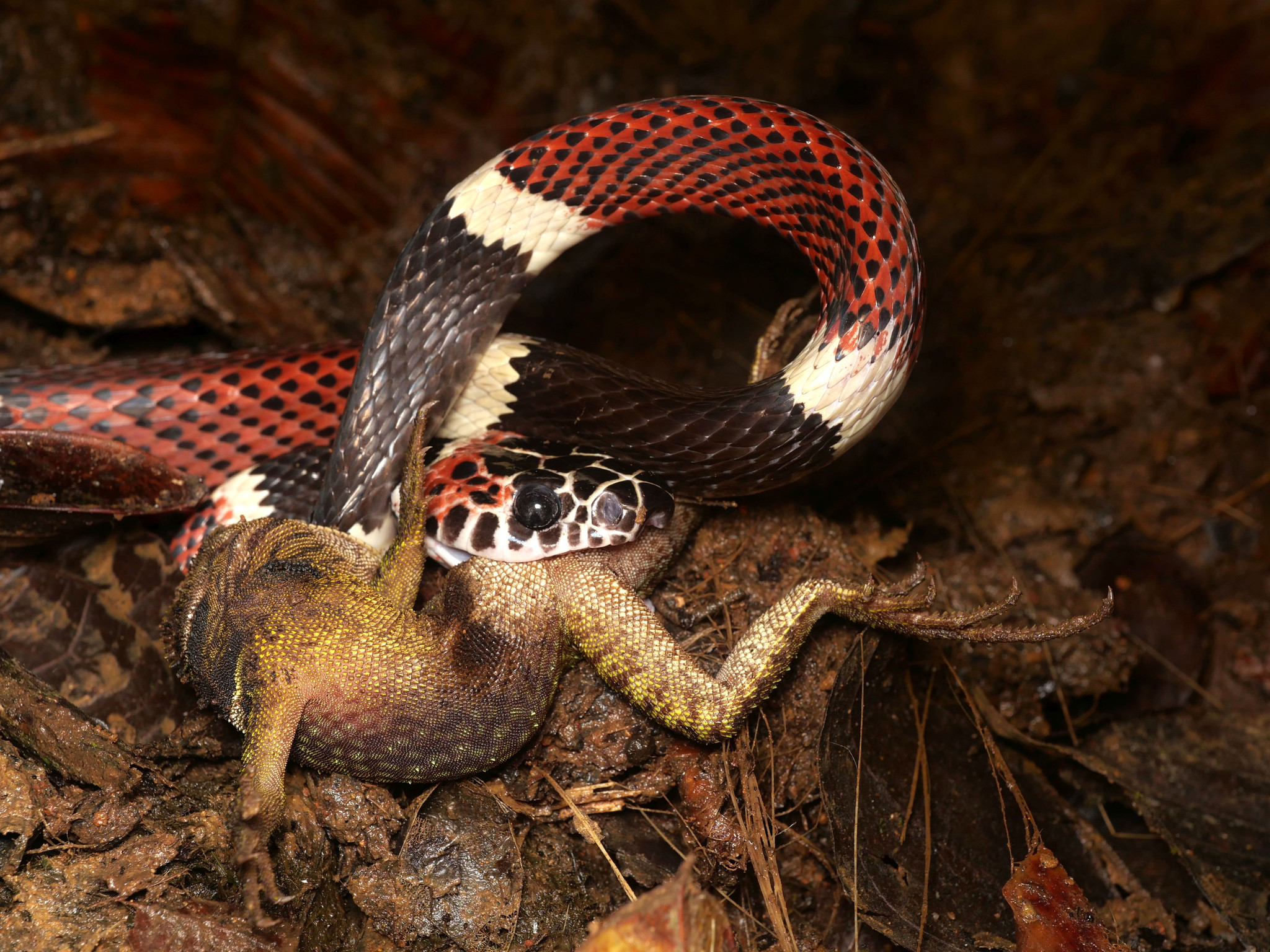
Eating Bocourt's dwarf iguana.

The preferred natural habitat of R. bovallii is forest, at altitudes from sea level to 900 m (3,000 ft).

== Reproduction ==
R. bovallii is oviparous.

== Mimicry ==
R. bovallii mimics two sympatric species of venomous snakes, Micrurus alleni and Micrurus nigrocinctus.
