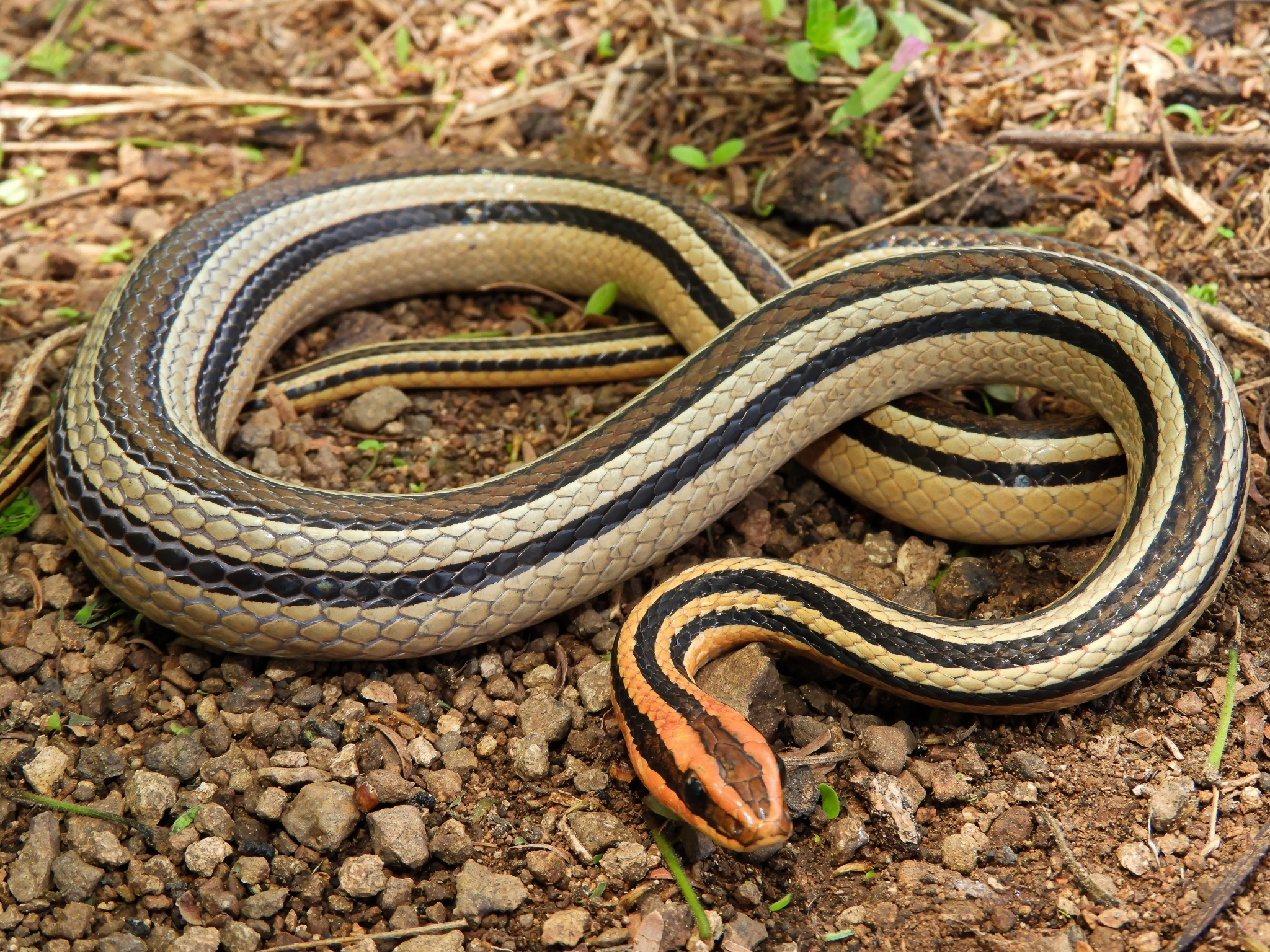

Conservation status
- Least Concern (IUCN 3.1)

Scientific classification
- Kingdom: Animalia
- Phylum: Chordata
- Class: Reptilia
- Order: Squamata
- Suborder: Serpentes
- Family: Colubridae
- Genus: Lygophis
- Species: L. lineatus

Binomial name
- Lygophis lineatus (Linnaeus, 1758)

= Lygophis lineatus =

Species of snake

Lygophis lineatus, the lined ground snake, is a species of snake in the family Colubridae. The species is native to Panama, Colombia, Venezuela, Guyana, Suriname, French Guiana, Brazil, Argentina, Bolivia, and Ecuador.
