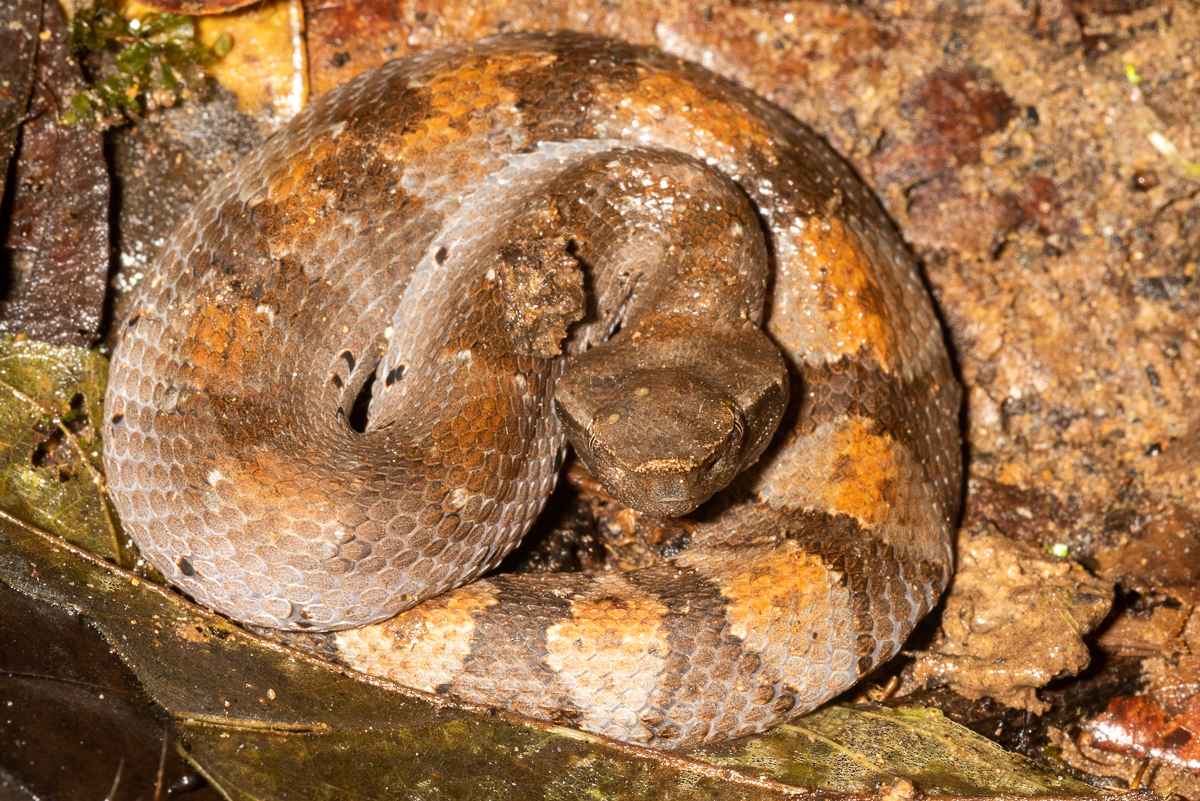

Scientific classification
- Kingdom: Animalia
- Phylum: Chordata
- Class: Reptilia
- Order: Squamata
- Suborder: Serpentes
- Family: Viperidae
- Genus: Bothrocophias
- Species: B. hyoprora

Binomial name
- Bothrocophias hyoprora Amaral, 1935

Synonyms
- Porthidium hyoprora – Campbell & Lamar, 1989; Bothrocophias hyoprora – Gutberlet & Campbell, 2001

= Bothrocophias hyoprora =

Species of snake

Bothrocophias hyoprora, or the Amazonian toad-headed pitviper, is a species of venomous snake in the family Viperidae. It is endemic to north-western South America.

== Geographic range ==
It is found in Bolivia, Brazil (in the states of Acre, Amazonas, Pará, and Rondônia), Colombia, Ecuador, and Peru.
