= Bothrops pulcher =

Scientific classification
- Domain: Eukaryota
- Kingdom: Animalia
- Phylum: Chordata
- Class: Reptilia
- Order: Squamata
- Suborder: Serpentes
- Family: Viperidae
- Genus: Bothrops
- Species: B. pulcher

Binomial name
- Bothrops pulcher (Peters, 1862)

Synonyms
- Trigonocephalus pulcher - Peters, 1862; Lachesis pulcher - Boulenger, 1896; Bothrops albocarinata - Shreve, 1934; Bothrops alticola - Parker, 1934; Bothrops albocarinatus - Peters & Orejas-Miranda, 1970; Bothrops alticolus - Peters & Orejas-Miranda, 1970; Bothriopsis albocarinata - Campbell & Lamar, 1989; Bothriopsis alticola - Campbell & Lamar, 1989; Bothrops pulcher - Campbell & Lamar, 1989; Bothriechis albocarinata - Schätti, Kramer & Touzet, 1990; Bothriechis alticolus - Schätti & Kramer, 1991; Bothriechis oligolepis albocarinatus - Schätti & Kramer, 1993; Bothriopsis pulchra - McDiarmid, Campbell & Touré, 1999

Species of snake

Common names: Andean forest-pitviper.

Bothrops pulcher is a venomous pitviper species found in South America. The specific name is Latin, meaning "beautiful", in reference to the color pattern. No subspecies are currently recognized.

== Description ==
A small and moderately slender species, only two lengths are given by Campbell and Lamar (2004): 76.4 cm for a specimen from Colombia and 65.9 cm for the type of Bothrops alticola, although the tail was incomplete.

The scalation includes 19-23 (usually 21) rows of keeled dorsal scales, 167-178/173-181 ventral scales in males/females and 63-64/53-60 subcaudal scales in males/females, with a varying number towards the end of the tail being divided. On the head there are 5-8 keeled intersupraocular scales, 7-9 (usually 7) supralabial scales, the second of which contacts the prelacunal, and 8-10 sublabial scales.

The color pattern consists of a greenish yellow or medium to dark green ground color that usually becomes more obscure towards the front of the body. The dorsal pattern is a series of 29 bands or transverse black spots that tend to fuse with each other towards the front part of the body. All of this is overlaid with a pattern of white dorsal keels. The belly is yellow with black mottling that usually increases down the body so that the tail is a uniform dark color. The end of the tail tends to be cream or pink with a rounded terminal spine. On the head, a cheek stripe is present that extends to the angle of the mouth. Above it is a parallel black stripe that runs from the supraoculars to the angle of the jaw. The labial scales are usually a very dark green color without any mottling. The iris is yellow and the tongue black.

== Geographic range ==
Found in South America on the eastern slopes of the Andes from south-central Colombia to southern Ecuador and northern Peru. The type locality given is "Quito" (Ecuador); a mistake according to Peters (1955).
