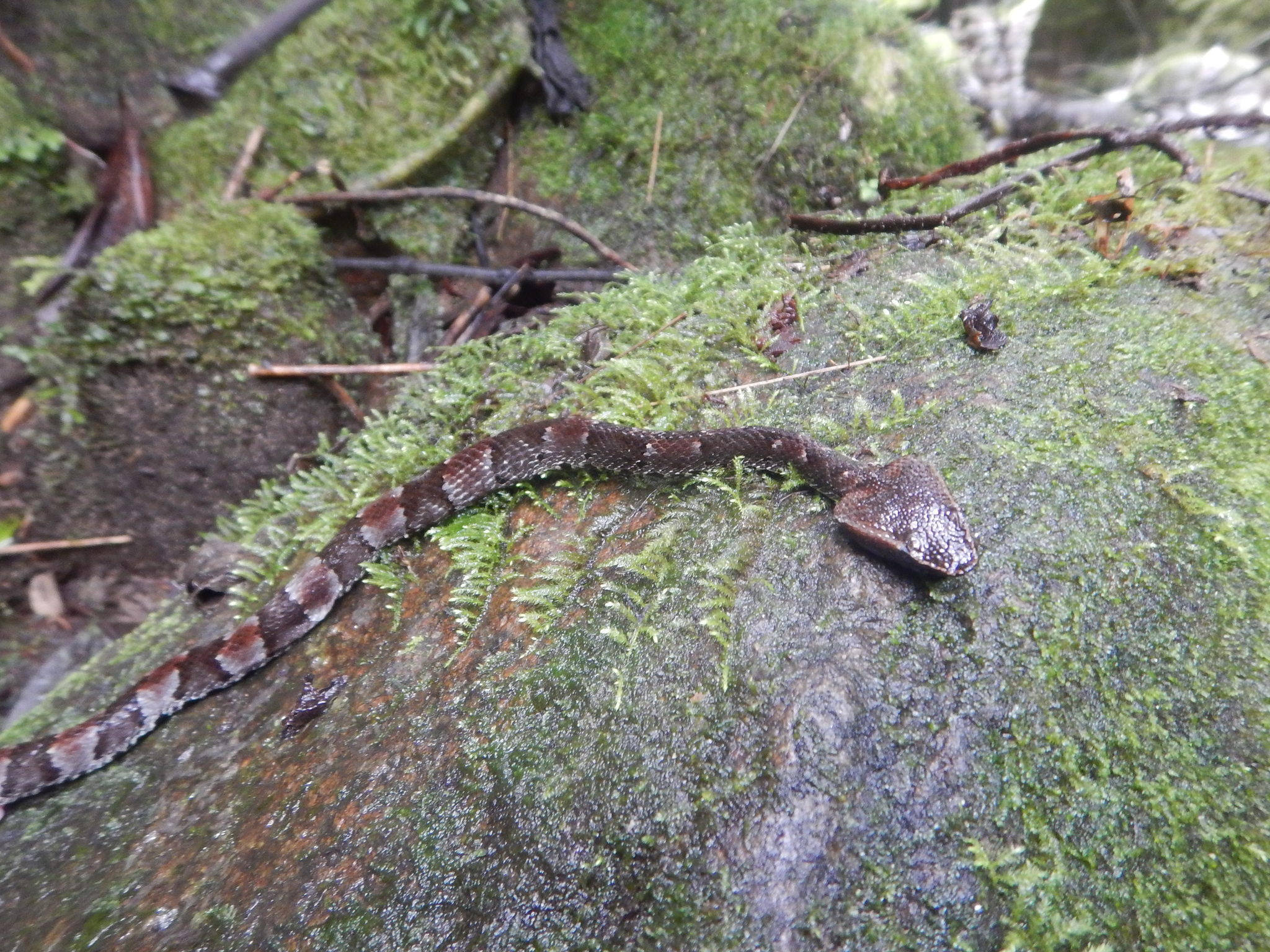

Scientific classification
- Kingdom: Animalia
- Phylum: Chordata
- Class: Reptilia
- Order: Squamata
- Suborder: Serpentes
- Family: Viperidae
- Genus: Bothrocophias
- Species: B. microphthalmus

Binomial name
- Bothrocophias microphthalmus Cope, 1875

Synonyms
- Bothrops microphthalmus Cope, 1875; Lachesis microphthalmus — Boulenger, 1896; Lachesis pleuroxanthus Boulenger, 1912; Porthidium microphthalmum — Schätti & Kramer, 1993; Bothrops microphthalmus — Welch, 1994; Bothrocophias microphthalmus — Gutberlet & Campbell, 2001; Bothrops microphthalmus — Lehr et al., 2002

= Bothrocophias microphthalmus =

Species of snake

Bothrocophias microphthalmus, or the small-eyed toad-headed pit viper, is a species of venomous snake in the family Viperidae. The species is endemic to northwestern South America.

== Geographic range ==
B. microphthalmus is found in Brazil, Colombia, Ecuador, Peru, and Bolivia.

The type locality is "between Balsa Puerto and Moyobamba, Peru".

== Description and Characteristics ==
The small eyed toad headed pit viper
