= Atractus arangoi =

Conservation status
- Critically Endangered (IUCN 3.1)

Scientific classification
- Kingdom: Animalia
- Phylum: Chordata
- Class: Reptilia
- Order: Squamata
- Suborder: Serpentes
- Family: Colubridae
- Genus: Atractus
- Species: A. arangoi

Binomial name
- Atractus arangoi Prado, 1940

Species of snake

Atractus arangoi, also known commonly as the big ground snake and the brown ground snake, is a species of snake in the subfamily Dipsadinae of the family Colubridae. The species is endemic to Colombia.

== Etymology ==
The specific name, arangoi, is in honor of Colombian physician and naturalist Andrés Posada-Arango.

== Geographic distribution ==
Atractus arangoi is found in southwestern Colombia, in Putumayo Department.

== Habitat ==
The preferred natural habitat of Atractus arangoi is rainforest.

== Behavior ==
Atractus arangoi is terrestrial.

== Reproduction ==
Atractus arangoi is oviparous.

== Conservation status ==
Atractus arangoi is listed as "Critically Endangered" by the International Union for Conservation of Nature (IUCN). The species is estimated to occur in an area of only 10 square kilometers (3.86 square miles). Little is known of its life history, abundance, and population trend.
