= Atractus major =

- Atractus major in Peru

Conservation status
- Least Concern (IUCN 3.1)

Scientific classification
- Kingdom: Animalia
- Phylum: Chordata
- Class: Reptilia
- Order: Squamata
- Suborder: Serpentes
- Family: Colubridae
- Genus: Atractus
- Species: A. major

Binomial name
- Atractus major Boulenger, 1894

Species of snake

Atractus major, the brown ground snake or big ground snake, is a species of snake in the family Colubridae. The species can be found in Ecuador, Venezuela, Brazil, Peru, and Colombia.
