= List of reptiles of Sudan =

This is a list of reptiles of Sudan in alphabetical order by scientific name.

- Acanthocercus atricollis (Smith, 1849)
- Acanthodactylus boskianus (Daudin, 1802)
- Acanthodactylus guineensis (Boulenger, 1887)
- Acanthodactylus scutellatus (Audouin, 1827)
- Adolfus africanus (Boulenger, 1906)
- Afroablepharus wilsoni (Werner, 1914)
- Afrotyphlops brevis (Scortecci, 1929)
- Afrotyphlops lineolatus (Jan, 1864)
- Afrotyphlops punctatus (Leach, 1819)
- Afrotyphlops schlegelii (Bianconi, 1847)
- Agama doriae Boulenger, 1885
- Agama hartmanni Peters, 1869
- Agama rueppelli Vaillant, 1882
- Agama spinosa Gray, 1831
- Aparallactus jacksonii (Günther, 1888)
- Atractaspis irregularis (Reinhardt, 1843)
- Atractaspis magrettii Scortecci, 1928
- Atractaspis phillipsi Barbour, 1913
- Bitis arietans Merrem, 1820
- Bitis gabonica Duméril, Bibron & Duméril, 1854
- Bitis nasicornis (Shaw, 1802)
- Broadleysaurus major (Duméril, 1851)
- Caretta caretta (Linnaeus, 1758)
- Causus maculatus (Hallowell, 1842)
- Causus resimus (Peters, 1862)
- Causus rhombeatus (Lichtenstein, 1823)
- Centrochelys sulcata (Miller, 1779)
- Cerastes cerastes Linnaeus, 1758
- Cerastes vipera Linnaeus, 1758
- Chalcides bottegi Boulenger, 1898
- Chalcides ocellatus (Forskal, 1775)
- Chalcides ragazzii Boulenger, 1890
- Chamaeleo africanus Laurenti, 1768
- Chamaeleo gracilis Hallowell, 1844
- Chamaeleo laevigatus Gray, 1863
- Chelonia mydas (Linnaeus, 1758)
- Chilorhinophis butleri Werner, 1907
- Cnemaspis dickersonae (Schmidt, 1919)
- Crocodylus niloticus Laurenti, 1768
- Crotaphopeltis degeni (Boulenger, 1906)
- Cyclanorbis elegans (Gray, 1869)
- Cyclanorbis senegalensis (Duméril & Bibron, 1835)
- Cyrtopodion scabrum (Heyden, 1827)
- Dasypeltis atra Sternfeld, 1912
- Dasypeltis scabra (Linnaeus, 1758)
- Dendroaspis jamesoni (Traill, 1843)
- Dipsadoboa weileri (Lindholm, 1905)
- Echis pyramidum (Geoffroy Saint-Hilaire, 1827)
- Eirenis africanus (Boulenger, 1914)
- Elapsoidea laticincta (Werner, 1919)
- Elapsoidea loveridgei Parker, 1949
- Elapsoidea semiannulata Bocage, 1882
- Eretmochelys imbricata (Linnaeus, 1766)
- Eryx colubrinus (Linnaeus, 1758)
- Eryx muelleri (Boulenger, 1892)
- Gerrhosaurus flavigularis Wiegmann, 1828
- Gonionotophis capensis (Smith, 1847)
- Gonionotophis savorgnani (Mocquard, 1887)
- Grayia smithii (Leach, 1818)
- Grayia tholloni Mocquard, 1897
- Heliobolus spekii (Günther, 1872)
- Hemidactylus angulatus Hallowell, 1854
- Hemidactylus brookii Gray, 1845
- Hemidactylus flaviviridis Rüppell, 1835
- Hemidactylus foudaii Baha El Din, 2003
- Hemidactylus isolepis Boulenger, 1895
- Hemidactylus robustus Heyden, 1827
- Hemidactylus sinaitus Boulenger, 1885
- Hemidactylus squamulatus Tornier, 1896
- Hemidactylus turcicus (Linnaeus, 1758)
- Hemirhagerrhis hildebrandtii (Peters, 1878)
- Hemirhagerrhis kelleri Boettger, 1893
- Hemirhagerrhis nototaenia (Günther, 1864)
- Heremites auratus (Linnaeus, 1758)
- Kinixys belliana Gray, 1831
- Latastia longicaudata (Reuss, 1834)
- Leptosiaphos aloysiisabaudiae (Peracca, 1907)
- Leptotyphlops emini (Boulenger, 1890)
- Letheobia pallida Cope, 1868
- Letheobia sudanensis (Schmidt, 1923)
- Letheobia toritensis Broadley & Wallach, 2007
- Lycophidion capense (Smith, 1831)
- Lycophidion depressirostre Laurent, 1968
- Lycophidion ornatum Parker, 1936
- Lygodactylus gutturalis (Bocage, 1873)
- Lygodactylus picturatus (Peters, 1870)
- Malpolon insignitus (Geoffroy Saint-Hilaire, 1827)
- Malpolon moilensis (Reuss, 1834)
- Malpolon monspessulanus (Hermann, 1804)
- Meizodon semiornatus (Peters, 1854)
- Mesalina guttulata (Lichtenstein, 1823)
- Mesalina martini (Boulenger, 1897)
- Mesalina rubropunctata (Lichtenstein, 1823)
- Micrelaps vaillanti (Mocquard, 1888)
- Mochlus afer (Peters, 1854)
- Mochlus mocquardi (Chabanaud, 1917)
- Mochlus sundevalli (Smith, 1849)
- Myriopholis braccianii (Scortecci, 1929)
- Myriopholis cairi (Duméril & Bibron, 1844)
- Myriopholis macrorhyncha (Jan, 1860)
- Naja haje (Linnaeus, 1758)
- Naja melanoleuca Hallowell, 1857
- Naja nigricollis Reinhardt, 1843
- Naja nubiae Wüster & Broadley, 2003
- Naja pallida Boulenger, 1896
- Natriciteres olivacea (Peters, 1854)
- Ophisops elbaensis Schmidt & Marx, 1957
- Pelomedusa schweinfurthi Petzold, Vargas-Ramírez, Kehlmaier, Vamberger, Branch, Du Preez, Hofmeyr, Meyer, Schleicher, Široký & Fritz, 2014
- Pelusios adansonii (Schweigger, 1812)
- Philochortus intermedius Boulenger, 1917
- Philothamnus angolensis Bocage, 1882
- Philothamnus battersbyi Loveridge, 1951
- Philothamnus bequaerti (Schmidt, 1923)
- Philothamnus heterolepidotus (Günther, 1863)
- Philothamnus irregularis (Leach, 1819)
- Philothamnus semivariegatus (Smith, 1840)
- Platyceps florulentus (Geoffroy Saint-Hilaire, 1827)
- Platyceps rhodorachis (Jan, 1865)
- Platyceps tessellata (Werner, 1910)
- Pristurus flavipunctatus Rüppell, 1835
- Pristurus rupestris Blanford, 1874
- Prosymna ambigua Bocage, 1873
- Prosymna greigerti Mocquard, 1906
- Psammophis biseriatus Peters, 1881
- Psammophis lineatus (Duméril, Bibron & Duméril, 1854)
- Psammophis orientalis Broadley, 1977
- Psammophis punctulatus Duméril & Bibron, 1854
- Psammophis schokari (Forskal, 1775)
- Psammophis sibilans (Linnaeus, 1758)
- Psammophis subtaeniatus Peters, 1882
- Psammophis sudanensis Werner, 1919
- Psammophis tanganicus Loveridge, 1940
- Pseuderemias brenneri (Peters, 1869)
- Pseuderemias mucronata (Blanford, 1870)
- Pseudotrapelus chlodnickii Melnikov, Śmiełowski, Melnikova, Nazarov & Ananjeva, 2015
- Pseudotrapelus sinaitus (Heyden, 1827)
- Ptyodactylus hasselquistii (Donndorff, 1798)
- Ptyodactylus ragazzii Anderson, 1898
- Python regius (Shaw, 1802)
- Python sebae (Gmelin, 1789)
- Rhamphiophis oxyrhynchus (Reinhardt, 1843)
- Rhamphiophis rostratus Peters, 1854
- Rhamphiophis rubropunctatus (Fischer, 1884)
- Scaphiophis albopunctatus Peters, 1870
- Scaphiophis raffreyi Bocourt, 1875
- Scincopus fasciatus (Peters, 1864)
- Scincus scincus (Linnaeus, 1758)
- Spalerosophis diadema (Schlegel, 1837)
- Stenodactylus petrii Anderson, 1896
- Stenodactylus sthenodactylus (Lichtenstein, 1823)
- Stigmochelys pardalis (Bell, 1828)
- Tarentola annularis (Geoffroy Saint-Hilaire, 1827)
- Tarentola ephippiata O'Shaughnessy, 1875
- Telescopus dhara (Forskal, 1775)
- Telescopus gezirae Broadley, 1994
- Telescopus obtusus (Reuss, 1834)
- Toxicodryas blandingii (Hallowell, 1844)
- Trachylepis brevicollis (Wiegmann, 1837)
- Trachylepis buettneri (Matschie, 1893)
- Trachylepis maculilabris (Gray, 1845)
- Trachylepis megalura (Peters, 1878)
- Trachylepis perrotetii (Duméril & Bibron, 1839)
- Trachylepis quinquetaeniata (Lichtenstein, 1823)
- Trachylepis striata (Peters, 1844)
- Trachylepis varia (Peters, 1867)
- Trachylepis wingati (Werner, 1908)
- Trapelus mutabilis (Merrem, 1820)
- Tricheilostoma dissimilis (Bocage, 1886)
- Trioceros bitaeniatus (Fischer, 1884)
- Trioceros conirostratus (Tilbury, 1998)
- Trioceros ellioti (Günther, 1895)
- Trioceros kinetensis (Schmidt, 1943)
- Trioceros rudis (Boulenger, 1906)
- Trionyx triunguis (Forskål, 1775)
- Tropiocolotes bisharicus Baha El Din, 2001
- Tropiocolotes nubicus Baha El Din, 1999
- Tropiocolotes steudneri (Peters, 1869)
- Tropiocolotes tripolitanus Peters, 1880
- Uromastyx acanthinura Bell, 1825
- Uromastyx dispar Heyden, 1827
- Uromastyx ocellata Lichtenstein, 1823
- Varanus exanthematicus (Bosc, 1792)
- Varanus griseus (Daudin, 1803)
- Varanus niloticus (Linnaeus, 1766)

== See also ==
- List of fauna of Sudan and South Sudan
