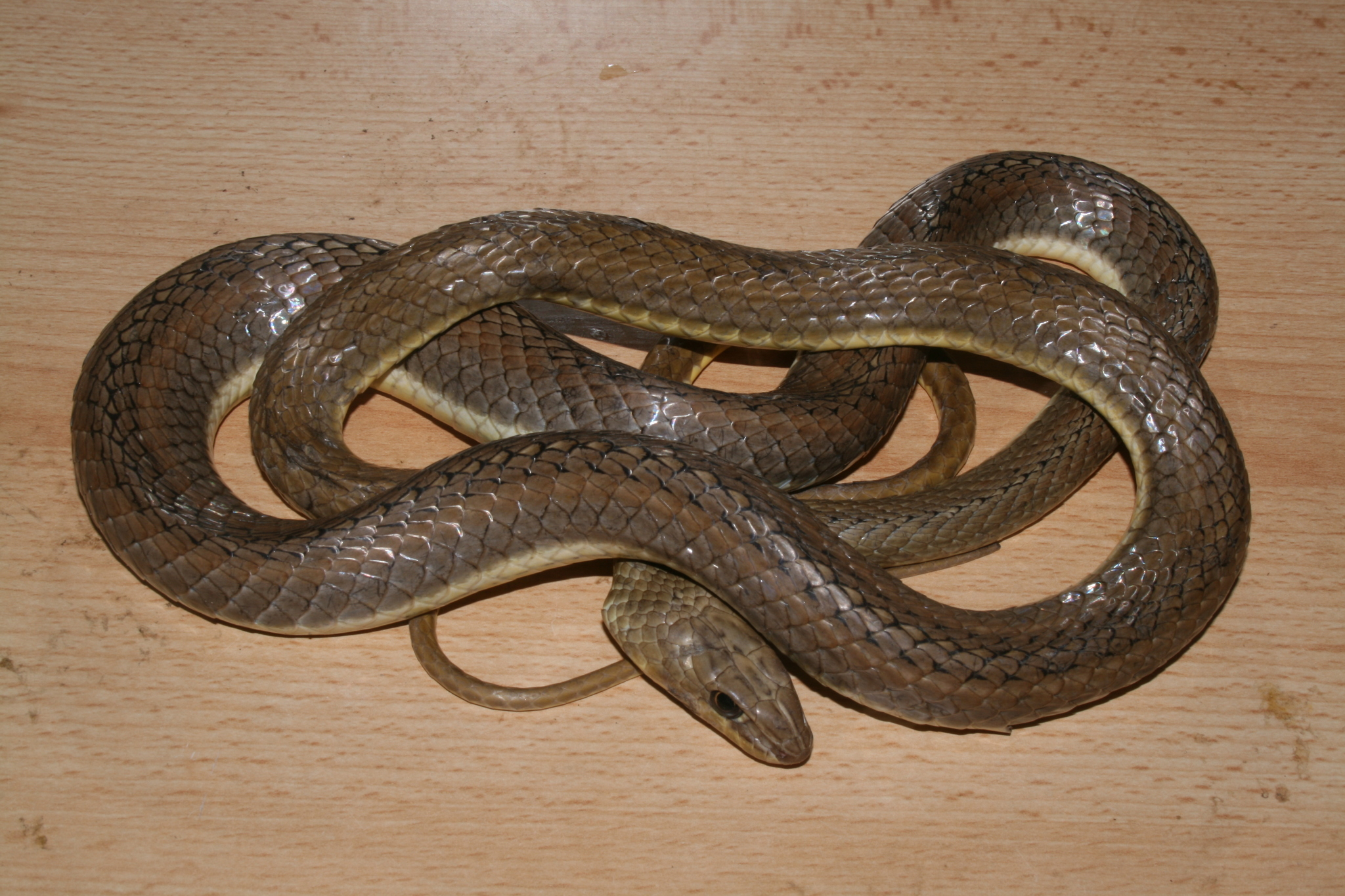

Conservation status
- Least Concern (IUCN 3.1)

Scientific classification
- Kingdom: Animalia
- Phylum: Chordata
- Class: Reptilia
- Order: Squamata
- Suborder: Serpentes
- Family: Psammophiidae
- Genus: Psammophis
- Species: P. rukwae

Binomial name
- Psammophis rukwae Broadley, 1966

Synonyms
- Psammophis sibilans rukwae Broadley 1966

= Psammophis rukwae =

Species of snake

Psammophis rukwae, commonly known as the Lake Rukwa sand snake or Rukwa sand racer, is a species of slender, fast-moving diurnal snakes belonging to the family Psammophiidae. Originally described by Donald George Broadley in 1966 as a subspecies of Psammophis sibilans, it was later elevated to full species status. Like other members of the genus Psammophis, it relies heavily on its sharp eyesight and immense speed to actively hunt its prey.
