= Hemirhagerrhis viperina =

Scientific classification
- Kingdom: Animalia
- Phylum: Chordata
- Class: Reptilia
- Order: Squamata
- Suborder: Serpentes
- Family: Psammophiidae
- Genus: Hemirhagerrhis
- Species: H. viperina

Binomial name
- Hemirhagerrhis viperina (Bocage, 1873)

Synonyms
- Psammophylax viperinus (Bocage, 1873); Psammophylax nototaenia (Bocage, 1895); Amplorhinus nototaenia (Boulenger, 1896); Hemirhagerrhis nototaenia viperinus (Bogert, 1940); Hemirhagerrhis nototaenia viperina (Mertens, 1955); Hemirhagerrhis nototaenia viperinus (Bauer, 1993)

Species of snake

Hemirhagerrhis viperina, commonly known as the viperine rock snake or western bark snake, is a species of snake in the family Psammophiidae. It is indigenous to areas within southwestern Angola and northwestern Namibia. It is partially arboreal. The nostrils of H. viperina has a vertical piercing in their nasal.
