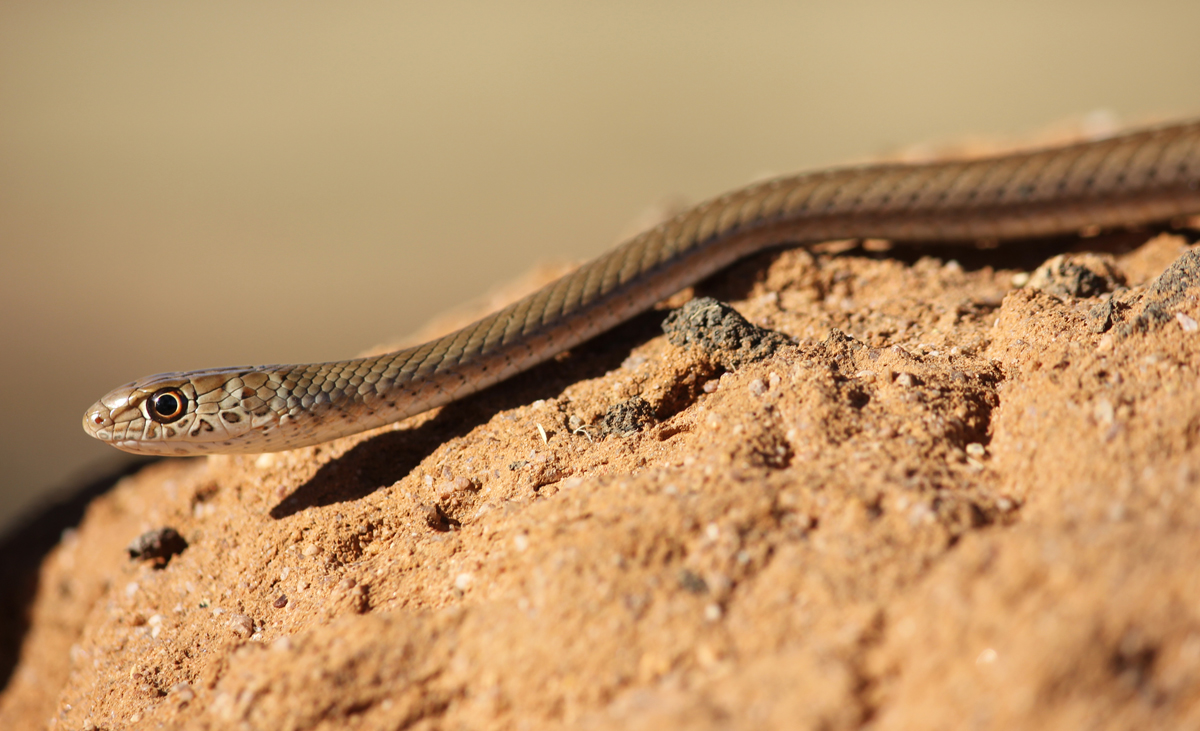

Scientific classification
- Domain: Eukaryota
- Kingdom: Animalia
- Phylum: Chordata
- Class: Reptilia
- Order: Squamata
- Suborder: Serpentes
- Family: Psammophiidae
- Genus: Psammophis
- Species: P. brevirostris

Binomial name
- Psammophis brevirostris Peters, 1881

= Psammophis brevirostris =

Short-snouted grass snake

Species of snake

Psammophis brevirostris, also known as the short-snouted grass snake, is a diurnal, mildly venomous snake native to southern Africa. It is oviparous and can lay up to 15 eggs in summer. The snake feeds on lizards, rodents, snakes and small birds; it is alert and considered fast.
