= Psammophis leopardinus =

Conservation status
- Least Concern (IUCN 3.1)

Scientific classification
- Kingdom: Animalia
- Phylum: Chordata
- Class: Reptilia
- Order: Squamata
- Suborder: Serpentes
- Family: Psammophiidae
- Genus: Psammophis
- Species: P. leopardinus

Binomial name
- Psammophis leopardinus Bocage, 1887

Synonyms
- Psammophis brevirostris leopardinus Haagner Et Al., 2000; Psammophis sibilans leopardinus Bocage, 1887

Species of snake

Psammophis leopardinus, commonly known as the leopard sand snake or leopard whip snake, is a slender, mildly venomous colubrid snake found in southern Africa (particularly Namibia, Botswana, and South Africa). It is characterized by its large eyes, rapid movements, and chain-like, leopard-like dorsal pattern.
