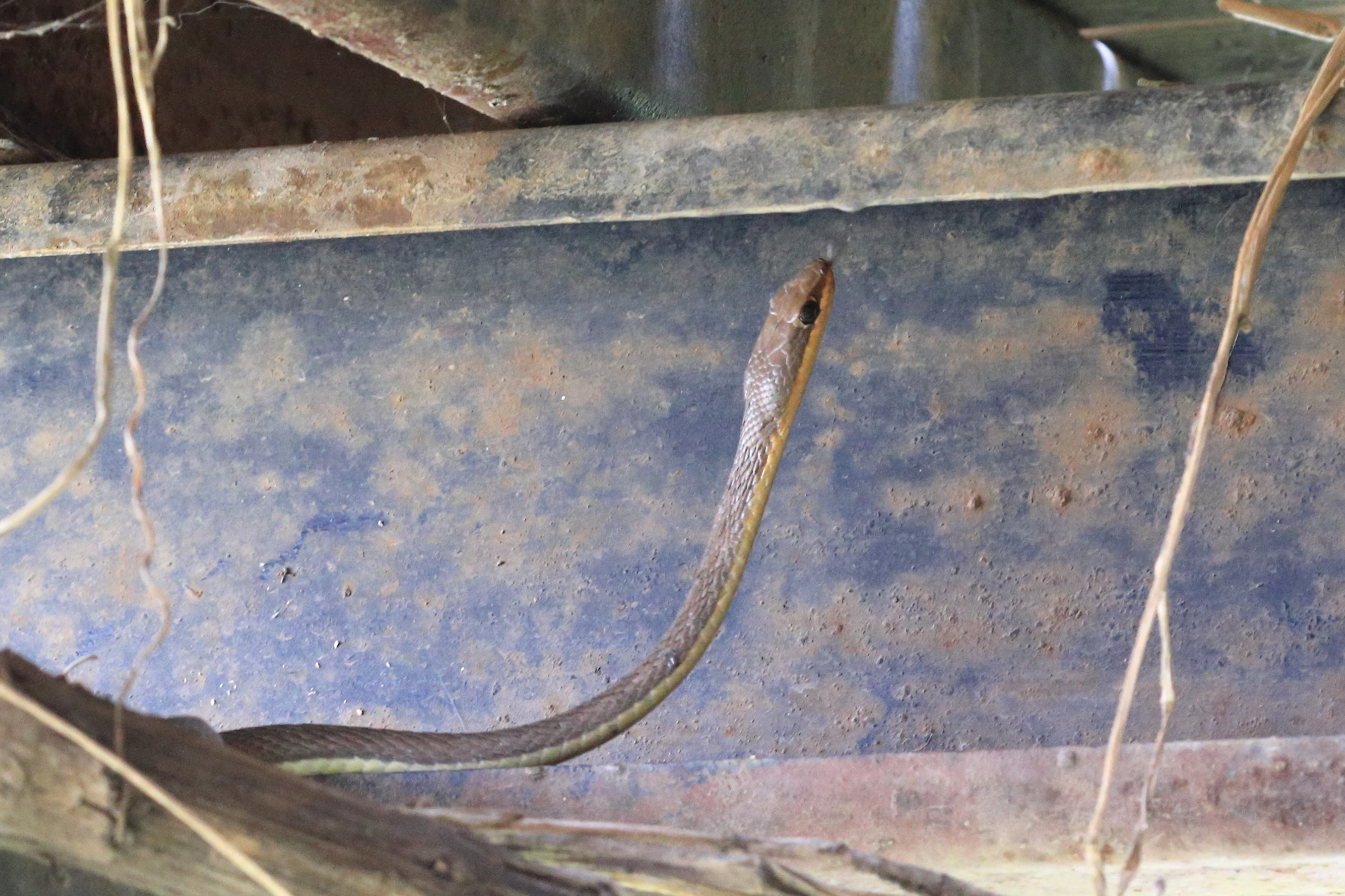

Conservation status
- Least Concern (IUCN 3.1)

Scientific classification
- Kingdom: Animalia
- Phylum: Chordata
- Class: Reptilia
- Order: Squamata
- Suborder: Serpentes
- Family: Psammophiidae
- Genus: Psammophis
- Species: P. jallae

Binomial name
- Psammophis jallae Peracca, 1896

Synonyms
- Psammophis longirostris Fitzsimons, 1932; Psammophis rohani Angel, 1921

= Psammophis jallae =

Species of snake

Psammophis jallae, commonly known as Jalla's sand snake, is a slender, strictly diurnal, and mildly venomous snake endemic to arid savannas in southern Africa. Though widely distributed across Namibia, Botswana, Angola, Zimbabwe, and South Africa (such as Limpopo), it is extremely elusive and rarely encountered in the wild.
