= Psammophis praeornatus =

Conservation status
- Least Concern (IUCN 3.1)

Scientific classification
- Kingdom: Animalia
- Phylum: Chordata
- Class: Reptilia
- Order: Squamata
- Suborder: Serpentes
- Family: Psammophiidae
- Genus: Psammophis
- Species: P. praeornatus

Binomial name
- Psammophis praeornatus (Schlegel, 1837)

Synonyms
- Dromophis praeornatus Schlegel, 1837

Species of snake

Psammophis praeornatus, also known as the Ornate Olympic Snake, is a species of colubrid snake. It was formerly one of two species placed in genus Dromophis, which was found to be nested within Psammophis. It is found in several African countries, including Burkina Faso, Senegal, Guinea-Bissau, Mali, Ivory Coast, Togo, Ghana, Benin, Niger, Nigeria, and Cameroon.
