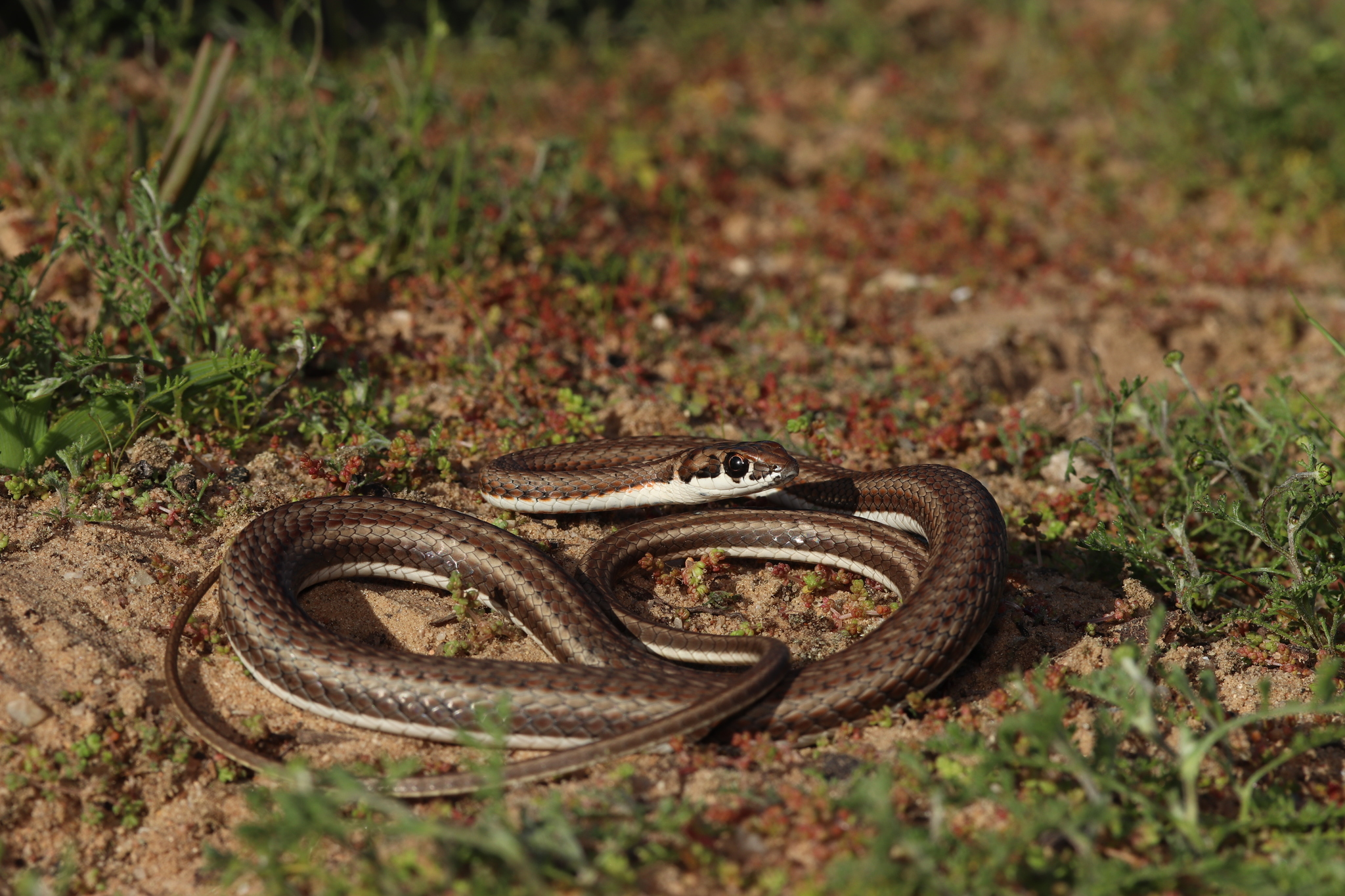

Conservation status
- Least Concern (IUCN 3.1)

Scientific classification
- Kingdom: Animalia
- Phylum: Chordata
- Class: Reptilia
- Order: Squamata
- Suborder: Serpentes
- Family: Psammophiidae
- Genus: Psammophis
- Species: P. notostictus

Binomial name
- Psammophis notostictus Peters, 1867

Synonyms
- Psammophis moniliger notostictus Peters, 1867

= Psammophis notostictus =

Species of snake

Psammophis notostictus, the Karoo sand snake or the Karoo whip snake, is a species of mildly venomous snake belonging to the genus Psammophis.

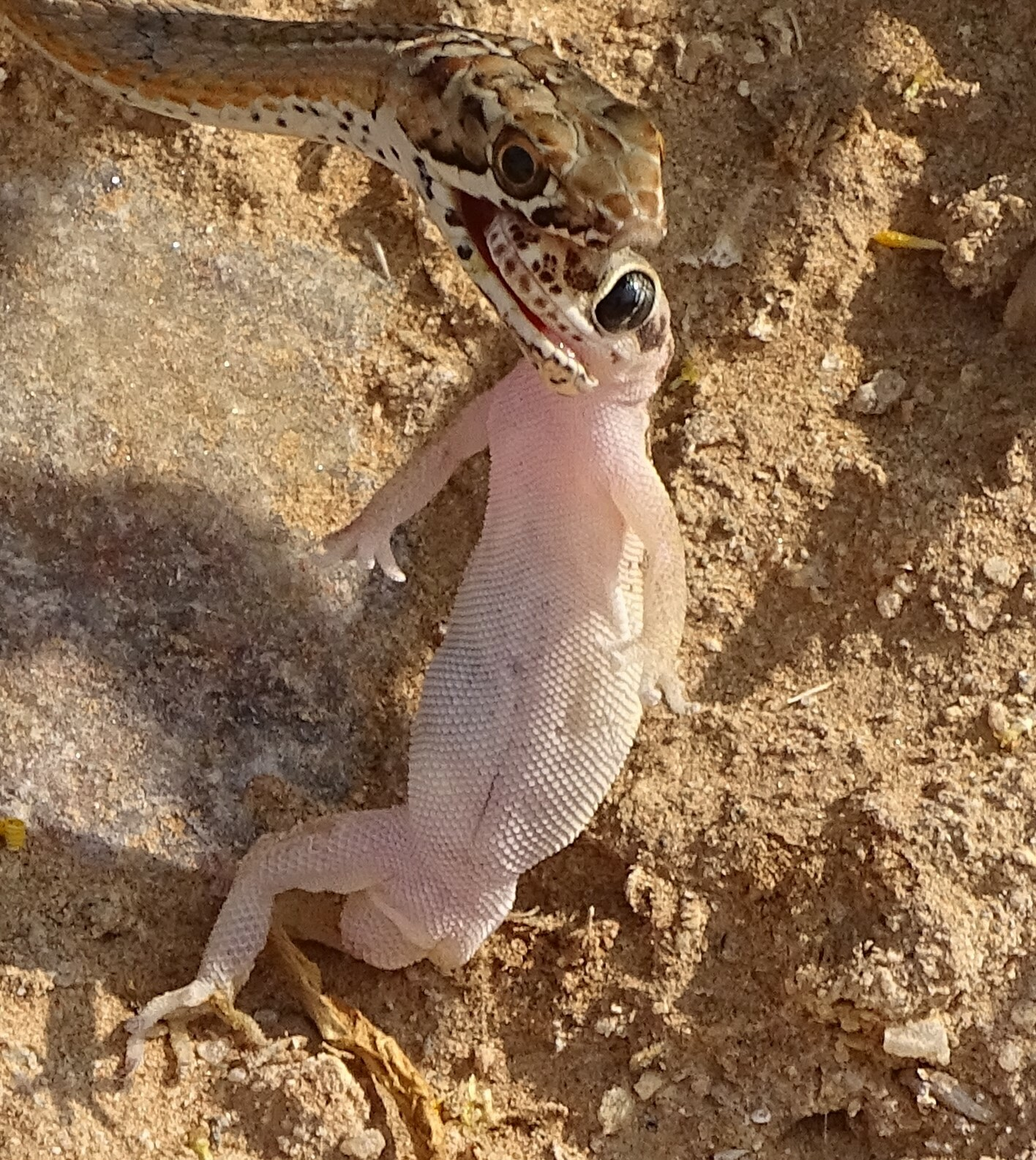
Eating a pointed thick-toed gecko
