= Psammophis odysseus =

Psammophis odysseus Temporal range: Late Miocene, 5.5 Ma

Scientific classification
- Domain: Eukaryota
- Kingdom: Animalia
- Phylum: Chordata
- Class: Reptilia
- Order: Squamata
- Suborder: Serpentes
- Family: Psammophiidae
- Genus: Psammophis
- Species: †P. odysseus

Binomial name
- †Psammophis odysseus Georgalis and Szyndlar, 2022

Extinct species of snake

Psammophis odysseus is an extinct species of terrestrial snake belonging to the family Psammophiidae. It lived around 5.5 million years ago and was discovered in Salobreña, Spain by Georgios Georgalis. It is believed to have inhabited Africa and migrated to Eurasia.

== Studies ==
The original fossils discovered of the species are held at Museum of Natural Sciences in Madrid, Spain. It was studied on by several scientists working on a project for the Institute of Systematics and Evolution of Animals of the Polish Academy of Sciences in Kraków.
