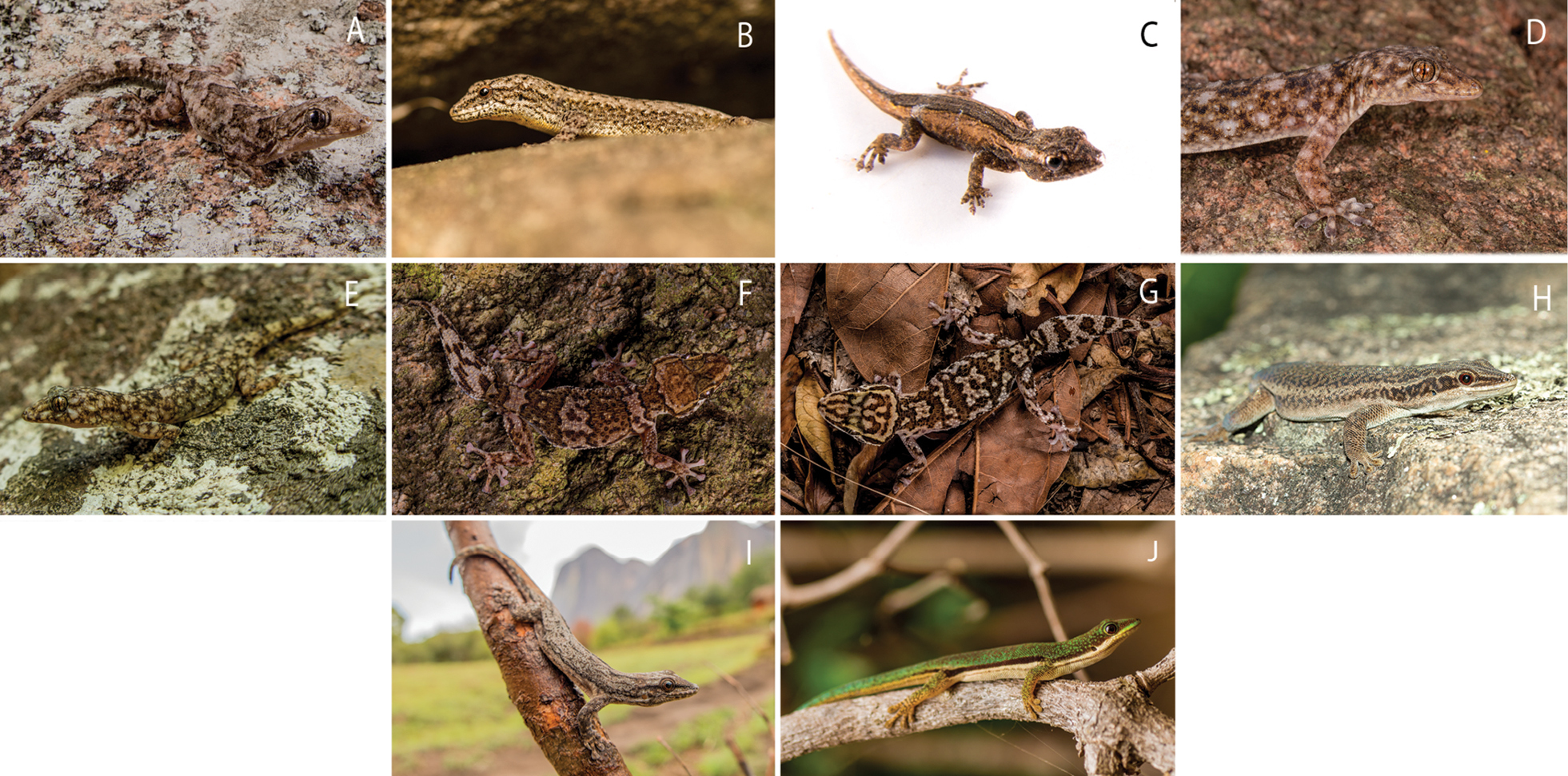
- Hemidactylus barbouri on Fig D

Scientific classification
- Domain: Eukaryota
- Kingdom: Animalia
- Phylum: Chordata
- Class: Reptilia
- Order: Squamata
- Infraorder: Gekkota
- Family: Gekkonidae
- Genus: Hemidactylus
- Species: H. barbouri

Binomial name
- Hemidactylus barbouri Loveridge, 1942

Synonyms
- Hemidactylus tropidolepis barbouri Loveridge, 1942; Hemidactylus squamulatus barbouri (Loveridge, 1942)

= Hemidactylus barbouri =

Species of lizard

Hemidactylus barbouri, also known as Barbour's leaf-toed gecko, is a species of house gecko native to coastal Kenya and Tanzania.
