= Psammophis pulcher =

Conservation status
- Least Concern (IUCN 3.1)

Scientific classification
- Kingdom: Animalia
- Phylum: Chordata
- Class: Reptilia
- Order: Squamata
- Suborder: Serpentes
- Family: Psammophiidae
- Genus: Psammophis
- Species: P. pulcher

Binomial name
- Psammophis pulcher Boulenger, 1895

Species of snake

Psammophis pulcher, commonly known as the beautiful sand snake or Boulenger's sand racer, is a highly elusive, small, and slender diurnal colubrid found in East Africa. It is considered one of the rarest snakes in the region.
