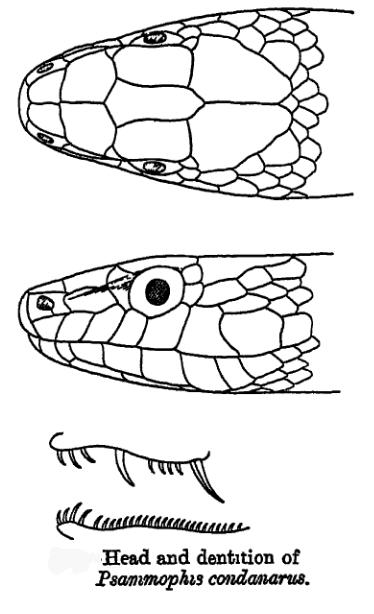

Scientific classification
- Kingdom: Animalia
- Phylum: Chordata
- Class: Reptilia
- Order: Squamata
- Suborder: Serpentes
- Family: Psammophiidae
- Genus: Psammophis
- Species: P. condanarus

Binomial name
- Psammophis condanarus (Merrem, 1820)

= Psammophis condanarus =

Species of snake

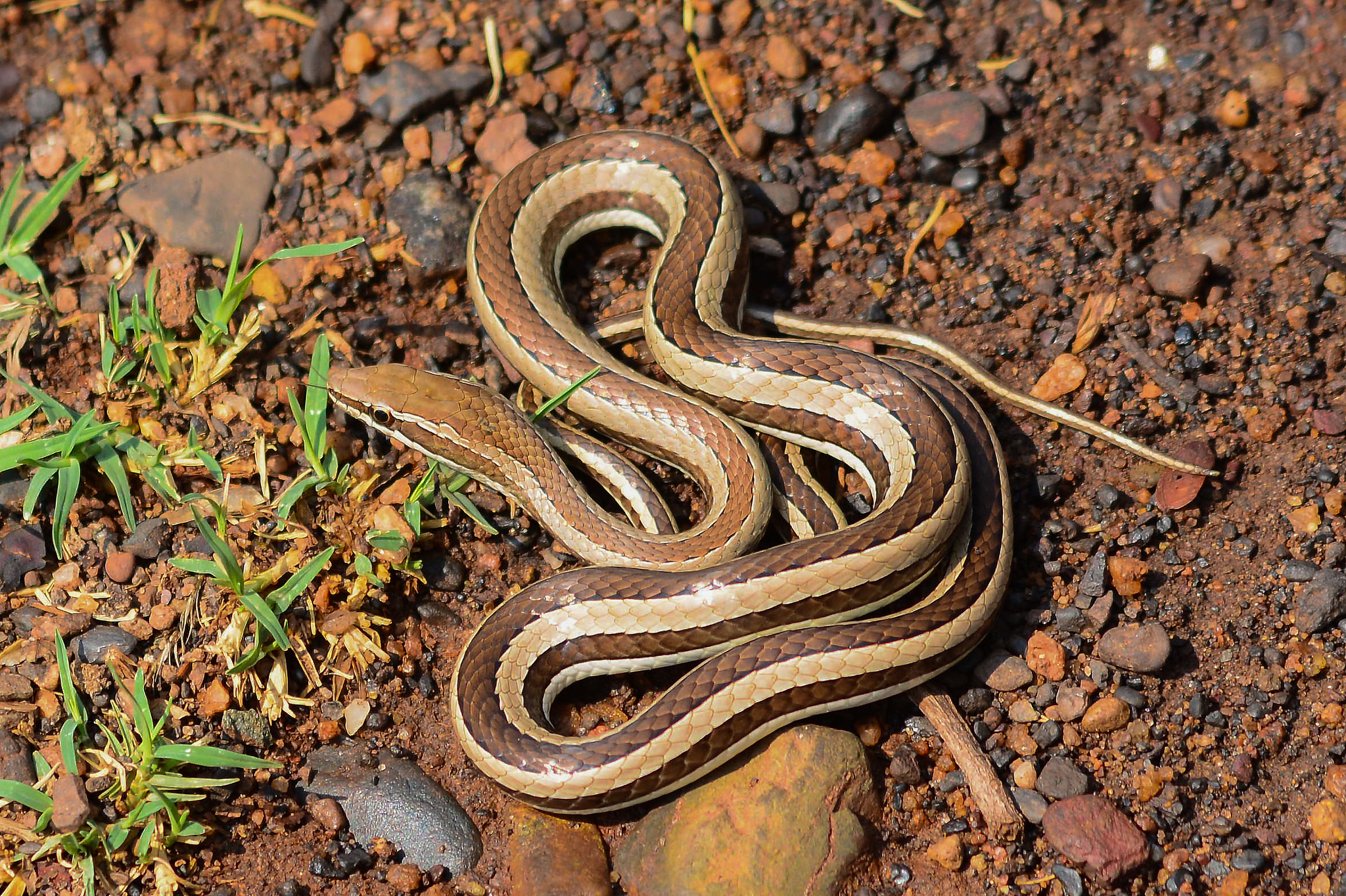
seen in Karnataka, India

Psammophis condanarus, the sand snake, is a species of snake found in dry low country zones of Indian peninsula (except the far south), Pakistan and Nepal. It is a fast-moving, diurnal, terrestrial species and lives in stony outcrops and boulders. It was first described from Ganjam area of Odisha State and then later on recorded from many parts of the Indian subcontinent.

== Distribution ==
This species is found in Bangladesh, Cambodia, India (Andhra Pradesh, Bihar, Chhattisgarh, Delhi, Gujarat, Haryana, Jharkhand, Karnataka, Madhya Pradesh, Maharashtra, Odisha, Punjab, Rajasthan, Telangana, Uttrakhand, Uttar Pradesh, West Bengal and Tripura), Laos, Myanmar, Nepal, Pakistan, Thailand, and Viet Nam.

The subspecies indochinensis is found in Thailand, Myanmar (Burma), and Cambodia. This form is now treated as a full species.

== Description ==
The rostral scales are as deep as broad, visible from above; nasal divided or semidivided; internasals rather more than half the length of the prefrontals; frontal very narrow, as long as or longer than its distance from the end of the snout, as long as the parietals; loreal about twice as long as deep; preocular single, not extending to the frontal; two postoculars; temporals 1+2 or 1+3, rarely 2+3; upper labials 8, fourth and fifth entering the eye; 4 lower labials in contact with the anterior chin-shields, which are as long as the posterior. Scales in 17 rows, ventrals 156–182; anal divided; subcaudals 75–90.

It is a pale olive-brown, with two pairs of more or less distinct dark bands each two scales wide j these bands, the lower of which passes through the eye, often black-edged; upper lip and lower parts uniform yellowish with a dark line along each side of the ventrals and subcaudals. The total length is around 3 ft (0.91 m); the tail is around 9 in (230 mm) in length.
