= Psammophis lineatus =

Conservation status
- Least Concern (IUCN 3.1)

Scientific classification
- Kingdom: Animalia
- Phylum: Chordata
- Class: Reptilia
- Order: Squamata
- Suborder: Serpentes
- Family: Psammophiidae
- Genus: Psammophis
- Species: P. lineatus

Binomial name
- Psammophis lineatus (Duméril, Bibron & Duméril, 1854)

Species of snake

Psammophis lineatus, commonly known as the lined olympic snake or lined grass snake, is a sleek, fast-moving snake species belonging to the sand racer genus Psammophis within the family Lamprophiidae. Historically classified by some authors under the genus Dromophis, modern genetic and taxonomic assessments place it firmly among the African sand and grass snakes.
