= Psammophis indochinensis =

Conservation status
- Least Concern (IUCN 3.1)

Scientific classification
- Kingdom: Animalia
- Phylum: Chordata
- Class: Reptilia
- Order: Squamata
- Suborder: Serpentes
- Family: Psammophiidae
- Genus: Psammophis
- Species: P. indochinensis

Binomial name
- Psammophis indochinensis M. A. Smith, 1943

Synonyms
- Psammophis condanarus indochinensis Smith, 1943; Taphrometopon indochinensis (Smith, 1943)

Species of snake

Psammophis indochinensis, also known as the Indo-Chinese sand snake, is a species of snake in the family Psammophiidae. Its conservation status is of "least concern". It is found at low elevations in Thailand, Cambodia, Laos, and Myanmar.
