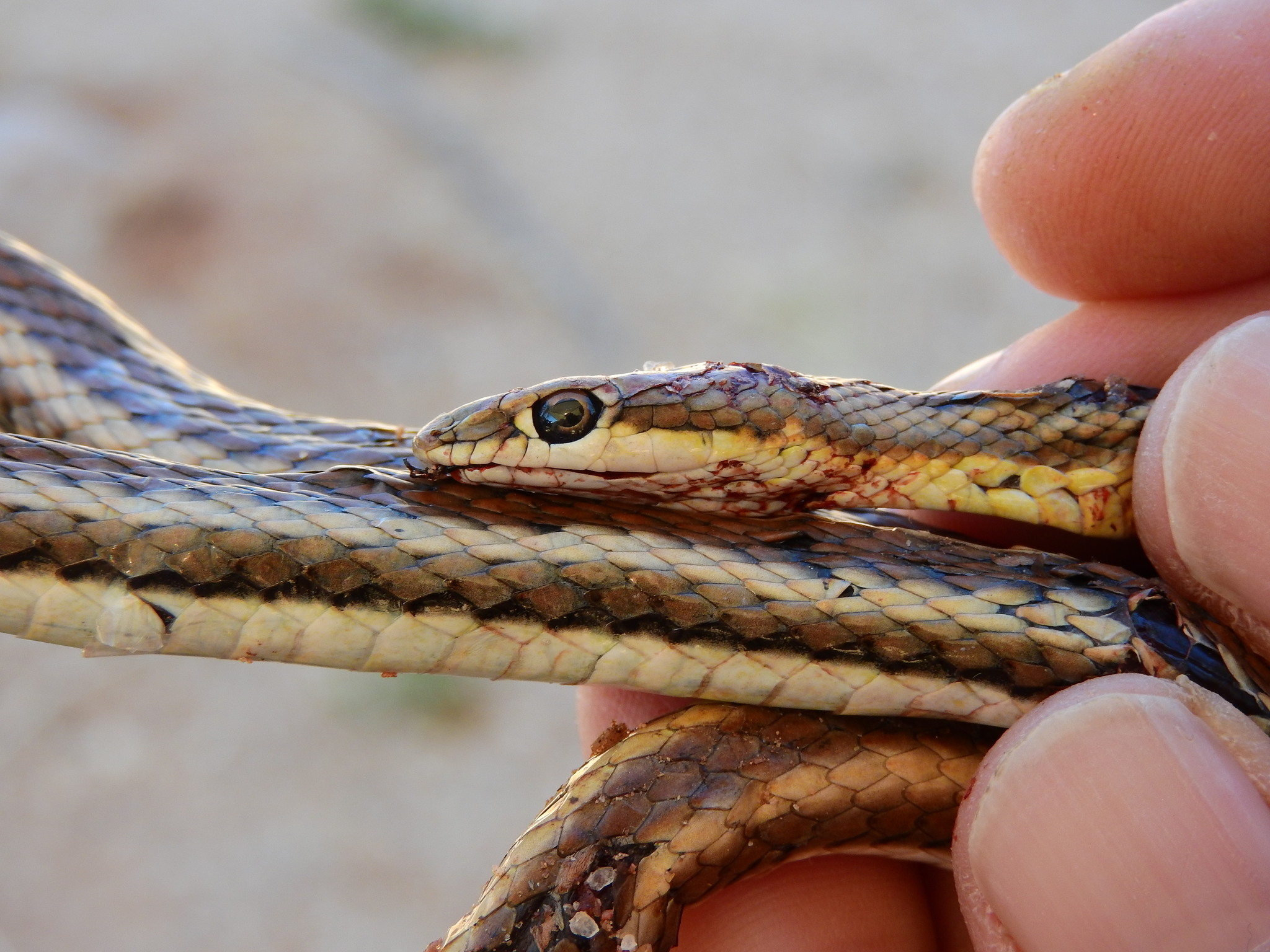
- Psammophis trigrammus, South Africa

Conservation status
- Least Concern (IUCN 3.1)

Scientific classification
- Kingdom: Animalia
- Phylum: Chordata
- Class: Reptilia
- Order: Squamata
- Suborder: Serpentes
- Family: Psammophiidae
- Genus: Psammophis
- Species: P. trigrammus

Binomial name
- Psammophis trigrammus Günther 1865

= Psammophis trigrammus =

Genus of snakes

Psammophis trigrammus, the western sand snake, is a diurnal, terrestrial snake in the family Psammophiidae from southwestern Africa.

== Description ==
Species of Psammophis are notorious for being slender and quick. Females are typically smaller and peak at a snout-vent length (SVL) of 540 mm, whereas males can reach a snout-vent length of up to 750 mm. It weighs 55 - 140 g (2 to 5 ounces), with males being smaller and lighter than females.

P. trigrammus has distinct coloration varying from pale olive to grey- brown along with a reddish to yellowish posterior. It is the Psammophis in southern Africa to have 9 supralabials and it has the highest ventral scale count of any southern African Psammophis.

In the genus Psammophis, the maxillary dentition consists of 10-13 teeth. One to two enlarged fang-like teeth are present near the middle of the maxilla, typically having an interspace, along with the posterior teeth being grooved. Within the mandible, the anterior teeth are elongated, while the posterior ones are smaller.

The head is demarcated from the neck and distinctly elongate, with a well-defined canthus rostralis. The eyes are relatively large with round pupils, the body is slender and cylindrical, covered in smooth dorsal scales arranged in 15 to 17 rows at midbody, bearing apical pits. The ventral scales are laterally rounded/ angulated. A long tail has subcaudal scales arranged in two rows.

== Taxonomic history and etymology ==
Psammophis comes from two branches of the Greek language, combining Hellenistic ψαμμο, "sand" + Classical Greek ὄΦις, "snake", creating the common phrase association "sand-snake".

Psammophis trigrammus was described by Albert Günther in 1865. The type specimen is BMNH 1946.1.8.12, collected in Little Fish Bay in Angola during the European "scramble for Africa".

== Geographic range ==
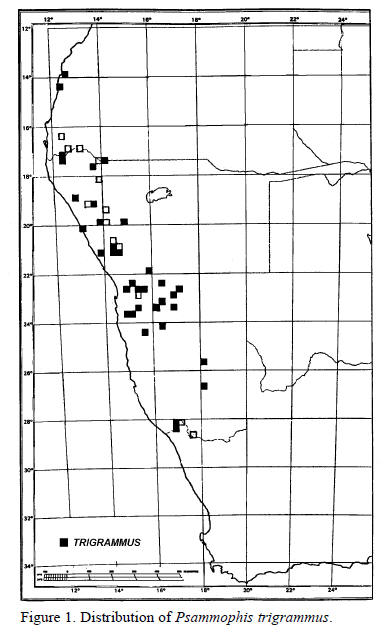
Map from Broadley 2002 (African Journal of Herpetology 51:83-119)

The species is found from southwestern Angola through western Namibia into northwestern South Africa (Namaqualand, on both sides of the Orange River). The habitat includes arid scrub and moist savanna.

== Diet ==
P. trigrammus primarily feeds on lizards, rodents, and other small vertebrates. Prey are subdued using a combination of constriction and venom.

=== Venom ===
Although the western sand snake is a rear-fanged (opisthoglyphous) biologically-venomous snake, it poses no threat to humans due to its mild and relatively weak venom along with non-aggressive behavior.

== Reproduction ==
All species in the genus Psammophis are oviparous. They engage in sexual reproduction, with the mating season typically occurring in spring, usually between April and May. Females lay up to 10 eggs. The average lifespan of the western whip snake is 10 years.

== Habitat and behavior ==
The western sand snake is typically found in low bushes and arid areas. Refugia include cracks in rocky hillsides. They are diurnal and bask in the sun.
