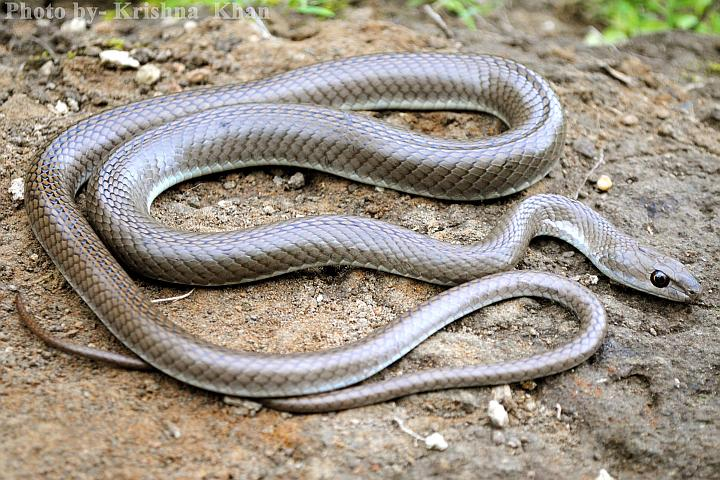
- Subadult Psammophis longifrons

Conservation status
- Least Concern (IUCN 3.1)

Scientific classification
- Kingdom: Animalia
- Phylum: Chordata
- Class: Reptilia
- Order: Squamata
- Suborder: Serpentes
- Family: Psammophiidae
- Genus: Psammophis
- Species: P. longifrons

Binomial name
- Psammophis longifrons Boulenger, 1890

= Psammophis longifrons =

Long sand racer

Species of snake

Psammophis longifrons, the stout sand snake or long sand racer, is a species of snake found in India. It can grow to a maximum length of 57 inches (145 centimetres).

== Description ==
Greyish above in front, browner behind, the scales edged with black, particularly those of vertebral region. The top of the head is uniform greyish brown, or the scales are edged with black. Greyish or yellowish below. Total length 1230 mm, tail 375 mm. Of considerably stouter build than the other Indian member of this genus.

Maxillary teeth 12 or 13, 2 in the middle very strongly enlarged, and preceded and followed by a distinct interval; internasal small, 1/2 or less than 1/2 the length of prefrontals; frontal long and narrow, not longer than its distance from end of snout, the anterior end suddenly not enlarged, not greatly broader there than in the middle, not in contact with the preocular; temporals 2+2, 8 supralabials 4th and 5th touching eye. V.166–175; C.79–93; A.2.

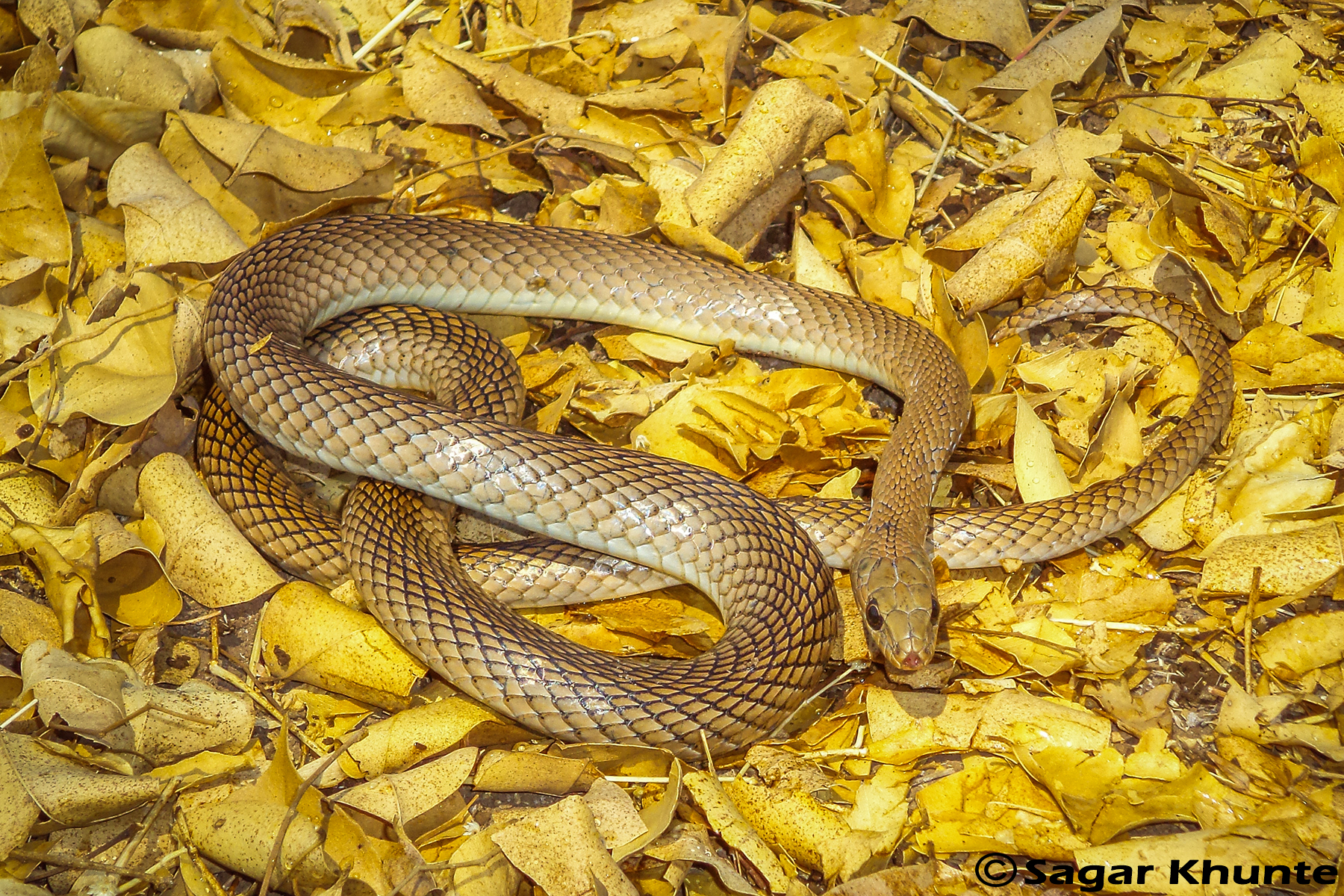
Stout sand snake (Maharashtra)

== Distribution ==
In Maharashtra it is reported from Bombay presidency north of 19 degree (Thana and Damanganga districts, Bulsar, Panch Mahal), C.P(Nagpur) and Amravati. In Gujarat; Surat, Valsad, Navsari. In Madhya Pradesh it is recorded from Ujjain and Hoshangabad. These records show that this species is distributed in a very narrow range, including three western Indian states, namely Gujarat (central and south), Maharashtra (northern) and Madhya Pradesh (mainly southern west).

== Food and behaviour ==
Its habits are both terrestrial and arboreal.

In captivity (for a short period), it was observed that the snakes were timid and well set without any aggression. Five types of lizards (Hemidactylus flaviviridis, H. triedrus, Calotes versicolor, and Eutropis carinata and four types of frogs (Duttaphrynus melanostictus, Euphlyctis cyanophlyctis, Sphaerotheca breviceps, and Polypedates maculatus) were provided and accepted as food.

== Reproduction ==
A female collected in Gujarat laid eight capsule shaped eggs.
