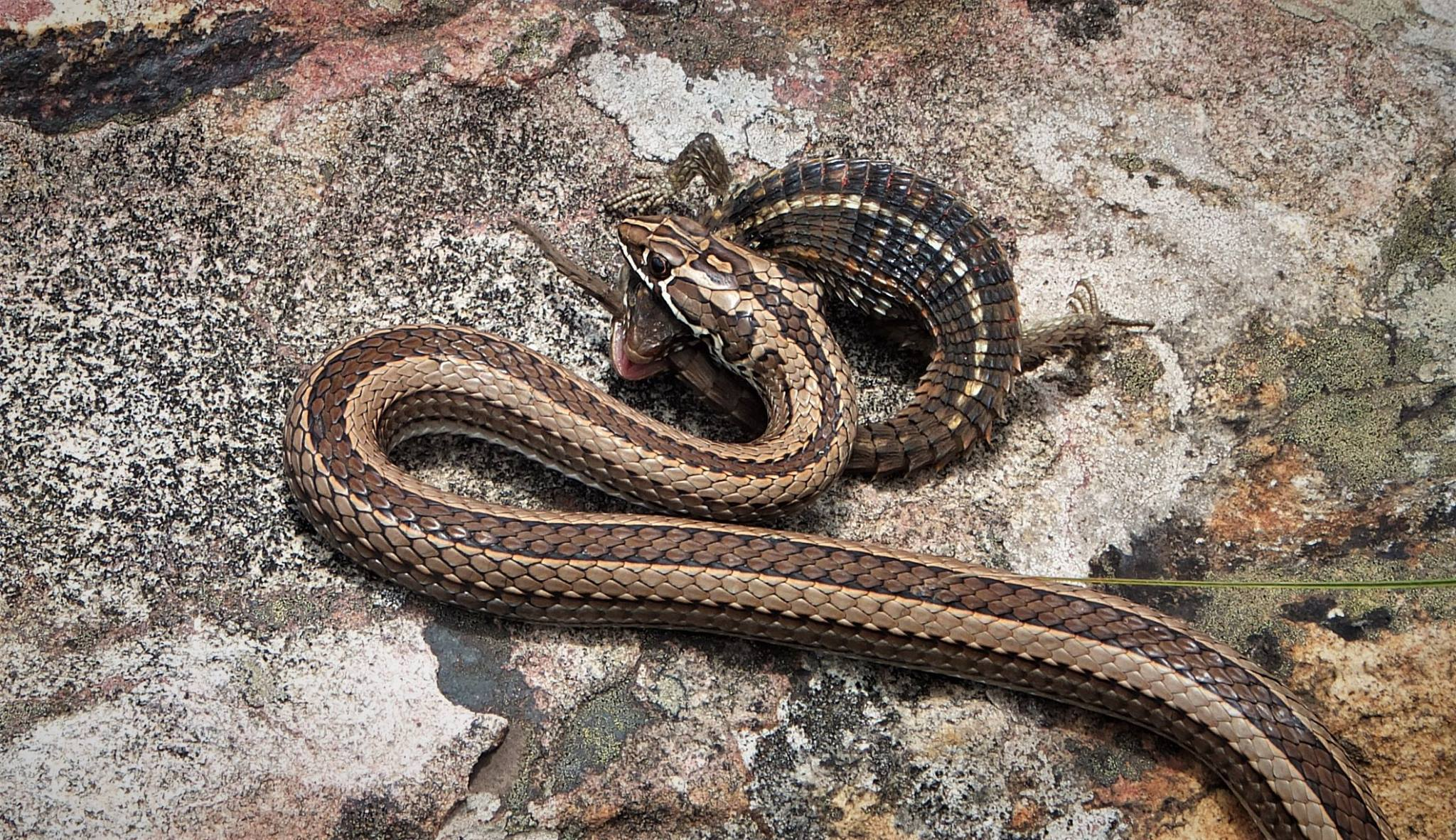

Conservation status
- Least Concern (IUCN 3.1)

Scientific classification
- Domain: Eukaryota
- Kingdom: Animalia
- Phylum: Chordata
- Class: Reptilia
- Order: Squamata
- Suborder: Serpentes
- Family: Psammophiidae
- Genus: Psammophis
- Species: P. crucifer

Binomial name
- Psammophis crucifer (Daudin, 1803)

= Psammophis crucifer =

Species of snake

Psammophis crucifer, the cross-marked grass snake or the cross-marked sand snake and Montane grass snake, is a species of mildly venomous snake belonging to the genus Psammophis.
