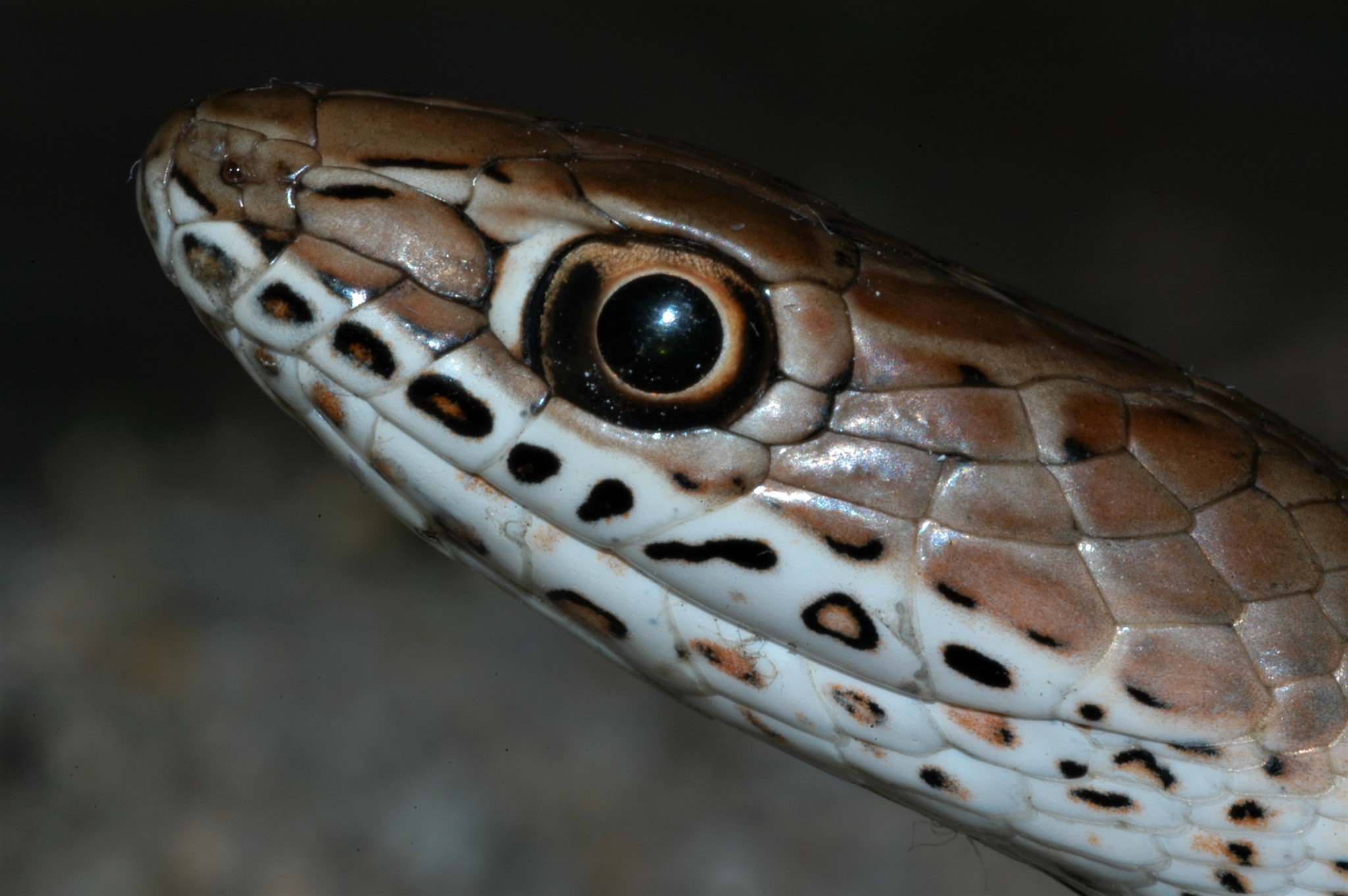

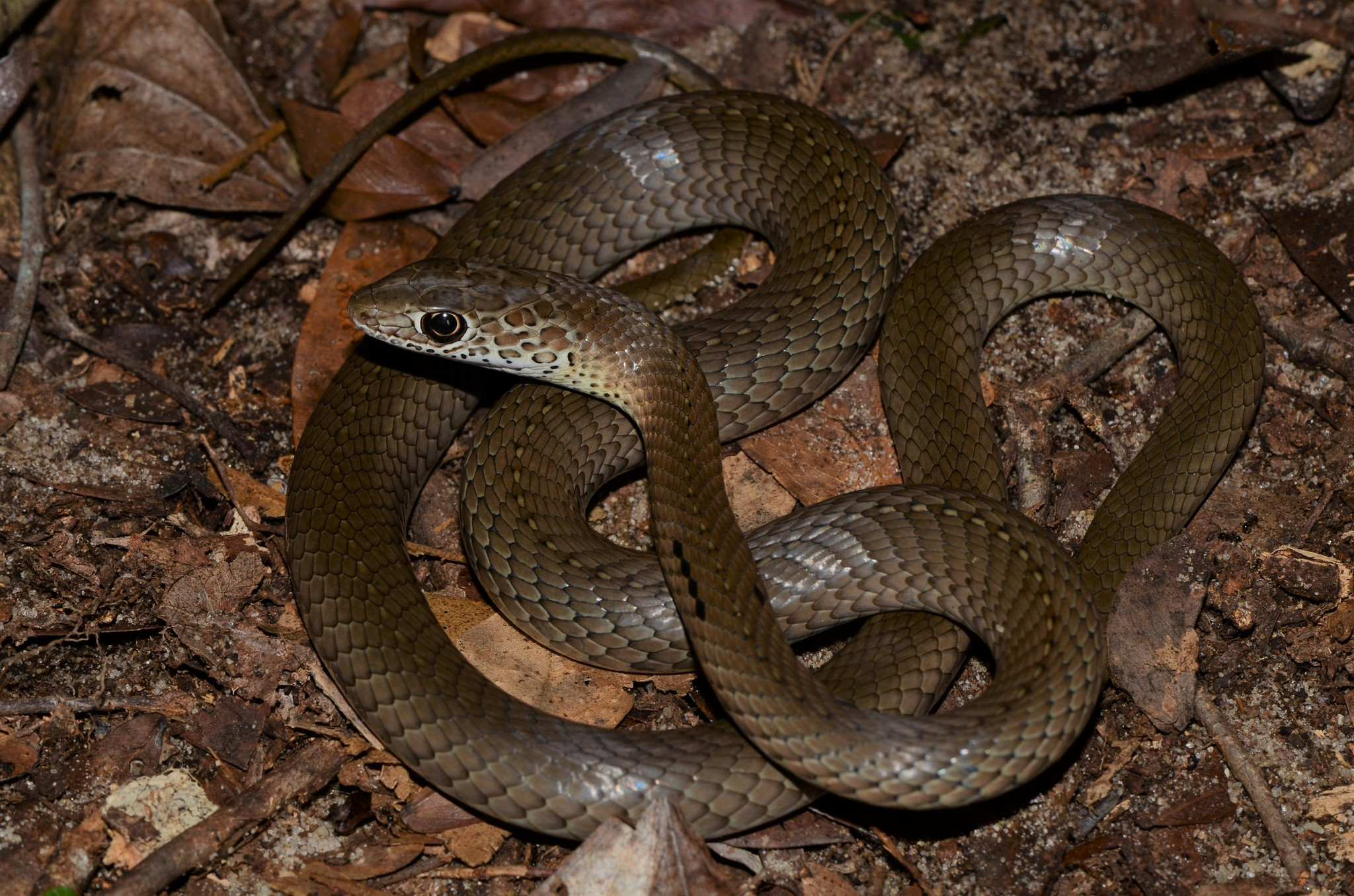

Conservation status
- Least Concern (IUCN 3.1)

Scientific classification
- Kingdom: Animalia
- Phylum: Chordata
- Class: Reptilia
- Order: Squamata
- Suborder: Serpentes
- Family: Psammophiidae
- Genus: Psammophis
- Species: P. mossambicus

Binomial name
- Psammophis mossambicus Peters, 1882

Synonyms
- Psammophis thomasi Gough, 1908; Psammophis sibilans Peters, 1882

= Psammophis mossambicus =

Olive grass snake

Species of snake

Psammophis mossambicus, the olive grass snake, is a snake species in the family Psammophiidae, the sand and whip snakes (not to be confused with the Australian olive whipsnake, Demansia olivacea).

== Distribution ==
P. mossambicus is native to Southern Africa (Angola, Botswana, Eswatini, Malawi, Mozambique, Namibia, eastern South Africa, Zambia, Zimbabwe), but may also be found in Central African Republic, Democratic Republic of the Congo, Gabon, Kenya, South Sudan, Tanzania, and Uganda, and as far north as southern Chad.

== Description ==
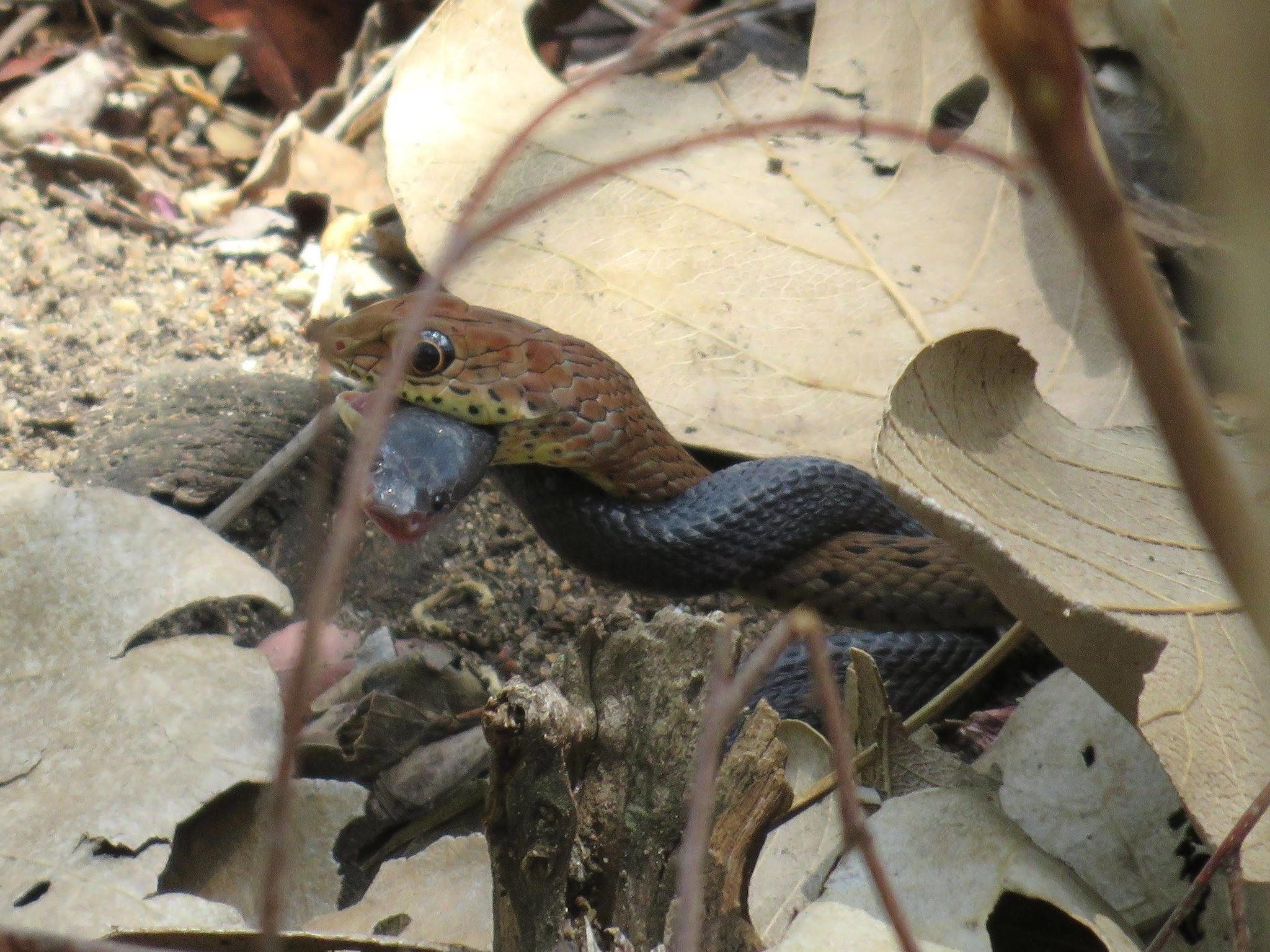
Eating a black file snake, Kruger NP

This snake grows to 100 to 180 cm (roughly 3–5 feet) in length, and lives in somewhat moist places near a source of water. It is olive-brown in color, with dark-edged scales and a lighter-hued underside. It is often confused with the black mamba, as it can raise its head in a similar fashion to the mambas, cobras and other elapid snakes; however, unlike the aforementioned species, the olive grass snake is opisthoglyphous (rear-fanged), with small teeth located at the back of the mouth that deliver mild venom (and/or toxic salival compounds), primarily used for subduing small, slippery or "squirmy" prey such as frogs, lizards and some rodents. It is considered mildly venomous to humans. No deaths have been recorded, though possible side effects of envenomation may include localised pain and swelling, nausea and fatigue.

In Afrikaans, it is known as olyfkleurige grasslang.
