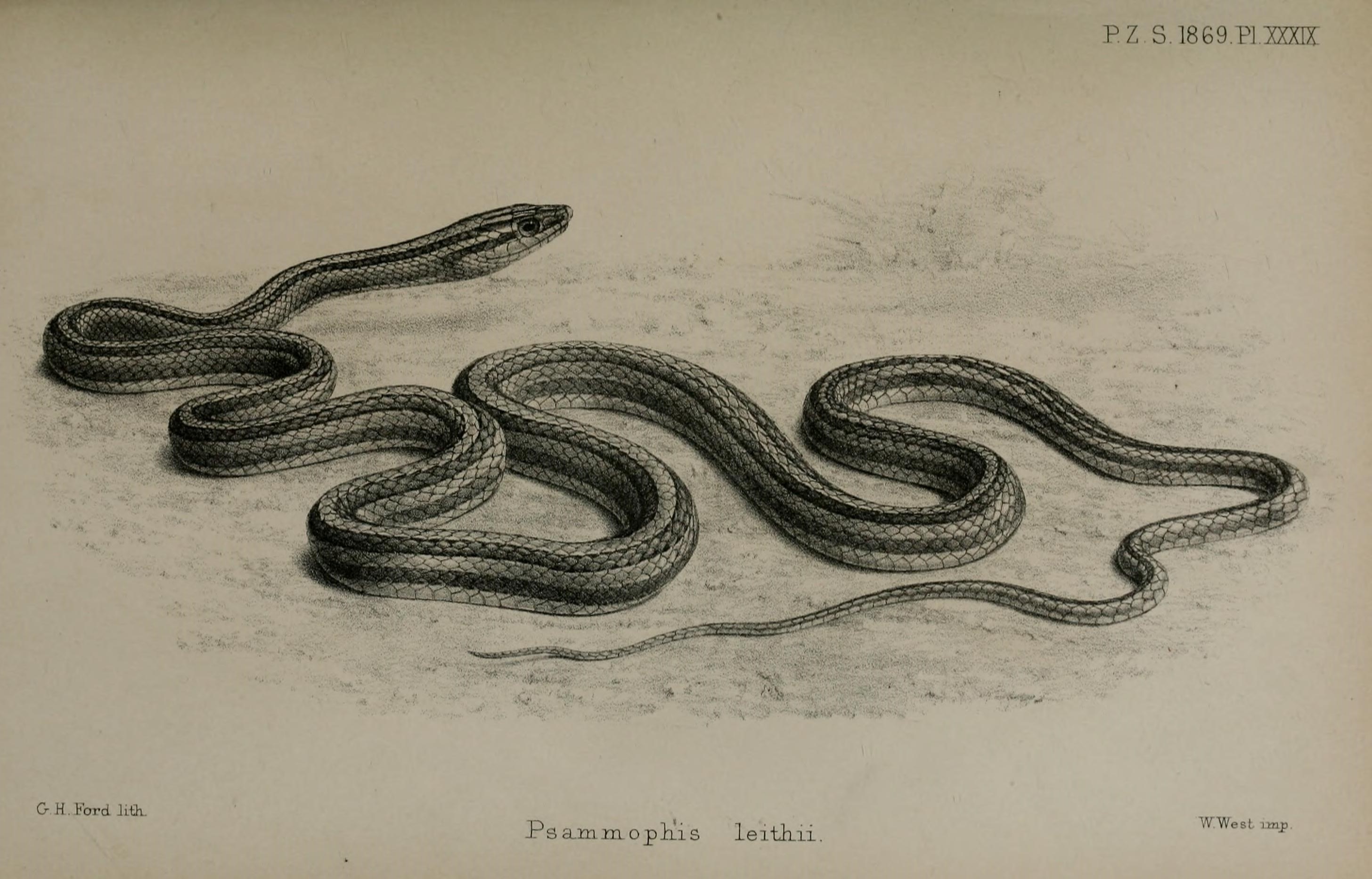

Conservation status
- Least Concern (IUCN 3.1)

Scientific classification
- Kingdom: Animalia
- Phylum: Chordata
- Class: Reptilia
- Order: Squamata
- Suborder: Serpentes
- Family: Psammophiidae
- Genus: Psammophis
- Species: P. leithii

Binomial name
- Psammophis leithii Günther, 1869

= Psammophis leithii =

Species of snake

Psammophis leithii, commonly called Leith's sand snake, the Pakistani ribbon snake, and the Pakistan sand racer, is a species of rear-fanged, mildly venomous snake in the family Psammophiidae. The species is native to South Asia. It is harmless to humans.

== Etymology ==
The specific name, leithii, is in honor of Andrew H. Leith, a physician with the Bombay Sanitary Commission.

== Geographic range ==
P. leithii is found in eastern Afghanistan, western India (Uttar Pradesh, Jammu-Kashmir, Madhya Pradesh, Maharashtra, Rajasthan, Gujarat), and Pakistan.

== Habitat ==
P. leithii is found in a variety of habitats, including desert, grassland, shrubland, forest, freshwater wetlands, and agricultural fields, at altitudes from 10–600 m (33–1,969 ft).

== Description ==
P. leithii has the rostral broader than deep, visible from above. The nostril is between two or three shields, the posterior nasal being frequently divided into two. The internasals are about half the length of the prefrontals. The frontal is very narrow, longer than its distance from the end of the snout, nearly as long as the parietals. The loreal is about twice as long as deep. There is a single preocular, in contact with the frontal; and two postoculars. The temporals are 1+2 or 2+2. There are 8 or 9 upper labials, the fourth and fifth (or fifth and sixth) entering the eye. There are 5 lower labials in contact with the anterior chin shields, which are a little shorter than the posterior chin shields. The dorsal scales are in 17 rows at midbody. The ventrals number 177–188. The anal is usually entire, and the subcaudals number 82–138.

P. leithii is pale greyish or yellowish above, with black dots or four longitudinal brown bands which are usually edged with black, the outer passing through the eyes. The lower parts are white, uniform or spotted or marked with grey or olive in the middle, with or without a dark lateral line or series of dots.

It may attain a total length of 3 feet 3 inches (99 cm), which includes a tail 1 ft (30 cm) long.

== Behavior ==
P. leithii is terrestrial, but it will climb low bushes to raid birds' nests.

== Diet ==
P. leithii preys upon small lizards, such as geckos and skinks, as well as birds.

== Reproduction ==
P. leithii is oviparous.

== Venom ==
Like all species in the genus Psammophis, P. leithii possess a mild venom, which is delivered to prey by means of enlarged, grooved teeth at the rear of the snake's upper jaws. The venom is not usually harmful to humans.
