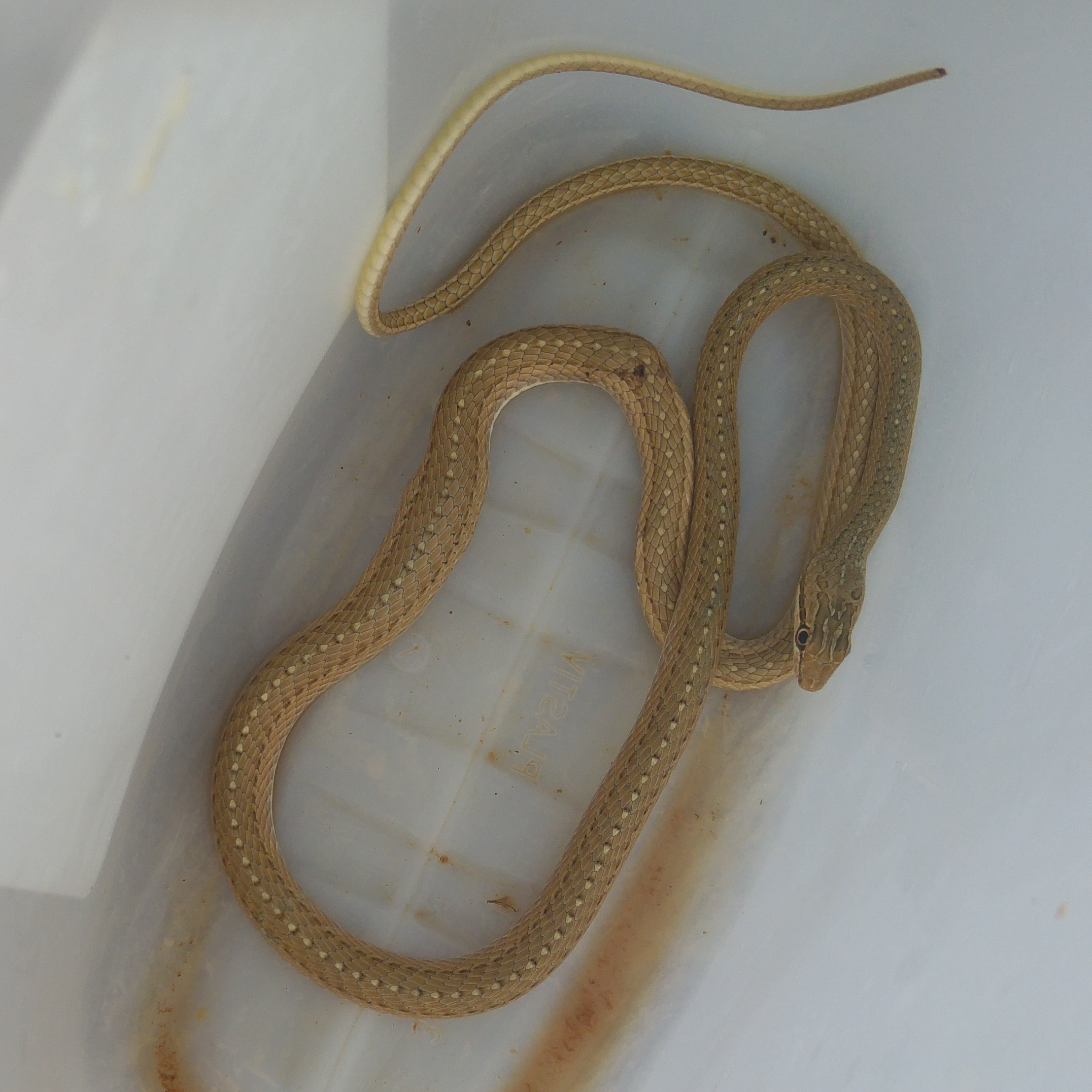

Conservation status
- Least Concern (IUCN 3.1)

Scientific classification
- Kingdom: Animalia
- Phylum: Chordata
- Class: Reptilia
- Order: Squamata
- Suborder: Serpentes
- Family: Psammophiidae
- Genus: Psammophis
- Species: P. aegyptius

Binomial name
- Psammophis aegyptius Marx, 1958

Synonyms
- Psammophis schokari aegyptius Kramer & Schnurrenberger, 1963

= Psammophis aegyptius =

Species of snake

Psammophis aegyptius, commonly known as the Saharan sand snake or Egyptian sand snake, is a species of highly agile, diurnal reptiles belonging to the family Psammophiidae. Originally described by herpetologist Hymen Marx in 1958, it was historically classified as a subspecies of Psammophis schokari before genetic testing confirmed it as a distinct, valid species.
