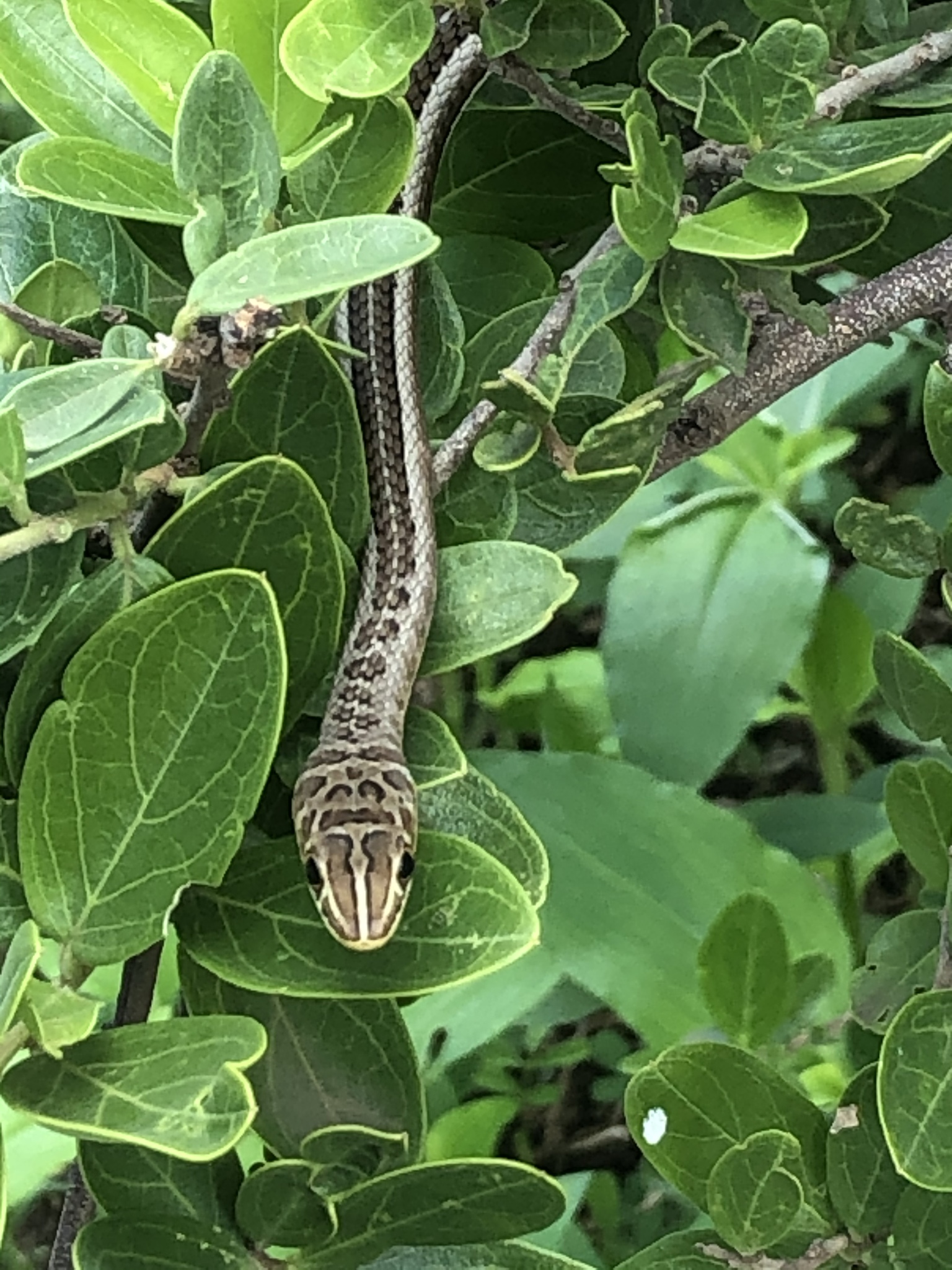

Conservation status
- Least Concern (IUCN 3.1)

Scientific classification
- Kingdom: Animalia
- Phylum: Chordata
- Class: Reptilia
- Order: Squamata
- Suborder: Serpentes
- Family: Psammophiidae
- Genus: Psammophis
- Species: P. sudanensis

Binomial name
- Psammophis sudanensis Werner, 1919

Synonyms
- Psammophis subtaeniatus sudanensis Werner, 1919

= Psammophis sudanensis =

Species of snake

Psammophis sudanensis, commonly known as the northern stripe-bellied sand snake or Sudanese sand snake, is a fast-moving, slender, and diurnal snake species found in East and Central African savannas. It is mildly venomous (rear-fanged) and harmless to humans, reaching lengths up to 1.3 meters. These snakes are active hunters feeding on lizards, rodents, and frogs.
