= Hemirhagerrhis hildebrandtii =

Scientific classification
- Kingdom: Animalia
- Phylum: Chordata
- Class: Reptilia
- Order: Squamata
- Suborder: Serpentes
- Family: Psammophiidae
- Genus: Hemirhagerrhis
- Species: H. hildebrandtii

Binomial name
- Hemirhagerrhis hildebrandtii (W. Peters, 1878)

Species of snake

Hemirhagerrhis hildebrandtii, commonly known as the Kenyan bark snake, is a species of snake in the family Psammophiidae. It is indigenous to areas within South Sudan, Ethiopia, Somalia, Kenya, and northeast Tanzania. Type locality is from "Kitui (Ukamba)" [Kenya]. Habitat is partially arboreal.
