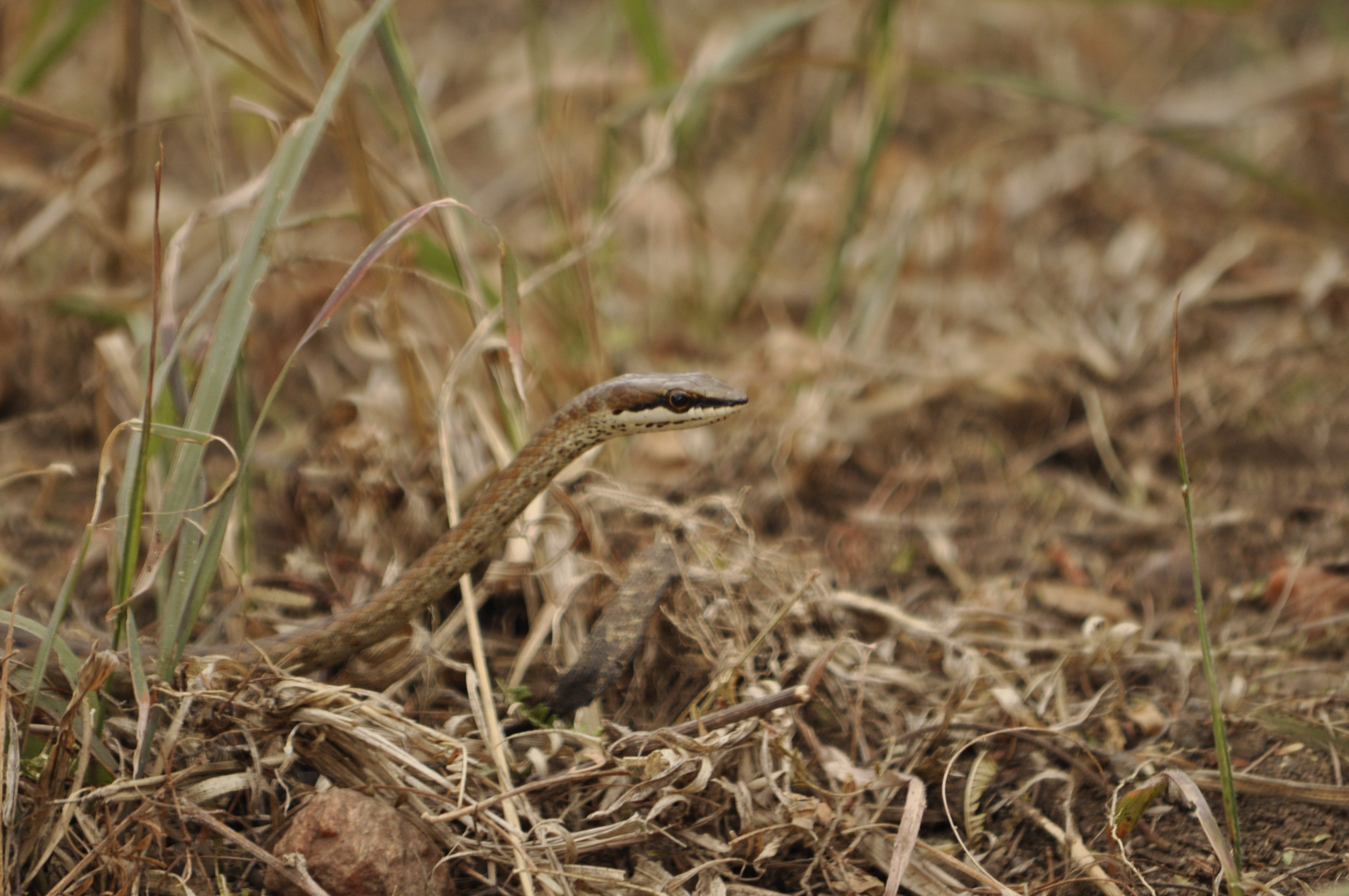

Conservation status
- Least Concern (IUCN 3.1)

Scientific classification
- Kingdom: Animalia
- Phylum: Chordata
- Class: Reptilia
- Order: Squamata
- Suborder: Serpentes
- Family: Psammophiidae
- Genus: Psammophis
- Species: P. biseriatus

Binomial name
- Psammophis biseriatus Peters, 1881

= Psammophis biseriatus =

Species of snake

Psammophis biseriatus, commonly known as the link-marked sand snake or two-striped sand racer, is a slender, swift, and mildly venomous colubrid snake found in the dry thornbush and arid regions of East Africa and the Horn of Africa.
