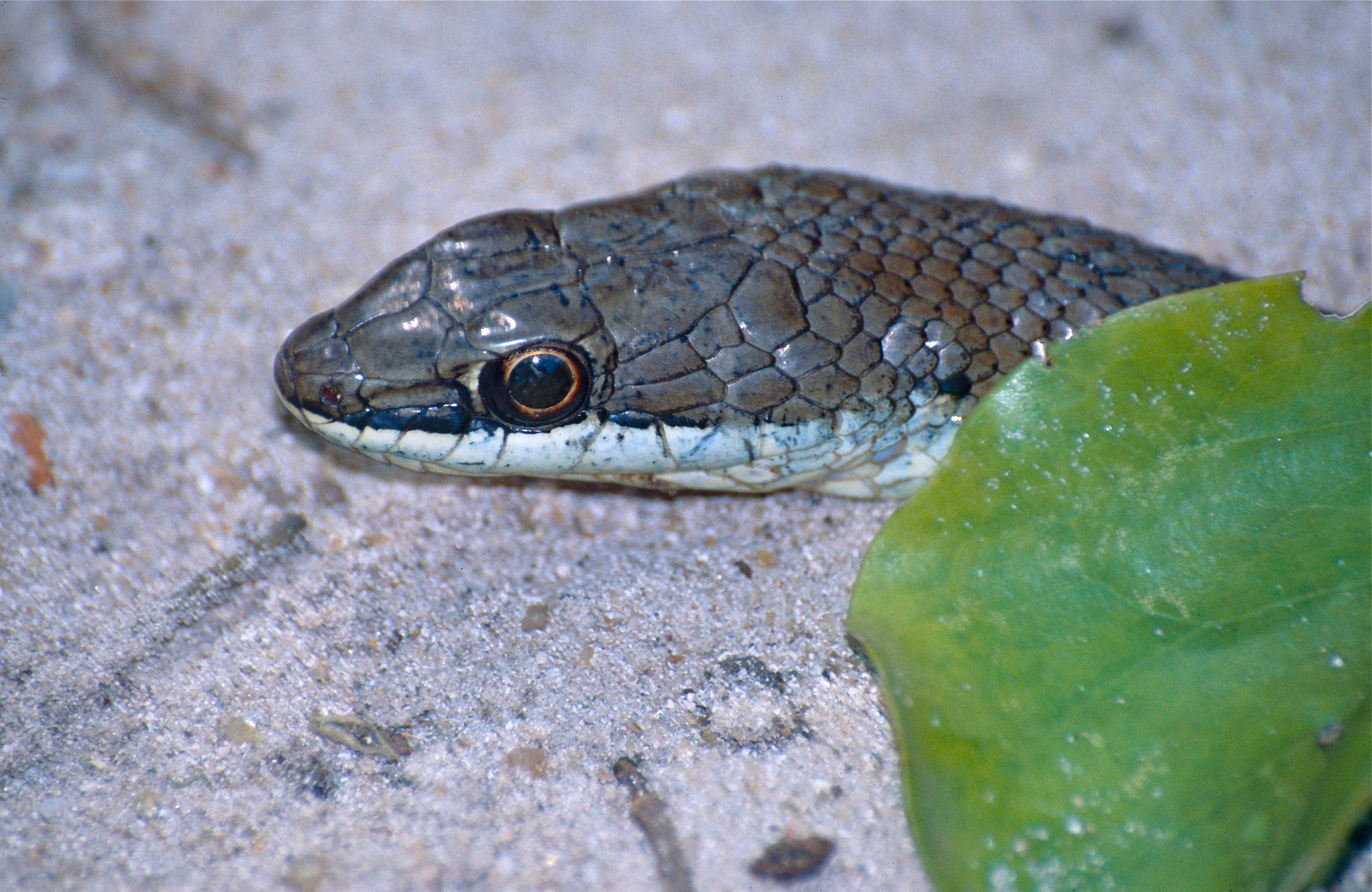

Conservation status
- Least Concern (IUCN 3.1)

Scientific classification
- Kingdom: Animalia
- Phylum: Chordata
- Class: Reptilia
- Order: Squamata
- Suborder: Serpentes
- Family: Psammophiidae
- Genus: Psammophis
- Species: P. orientalis

Binomial name
- Psammophis orientalis Broadley, 1977

Synonyms
- Psammophis subtaeniatus orientalis Broadley, 1977

= Psammophis orientalis =

Species of snake

Psammophis orientalis, commonly known as the eastern stripe-bellied sand snake, is a fast-moving, diurnal reptile found predominantly in East Africa. It belongs to the family Psammophiidae and is recognized for its slender profile and highly active daytime hunting behaviors.
