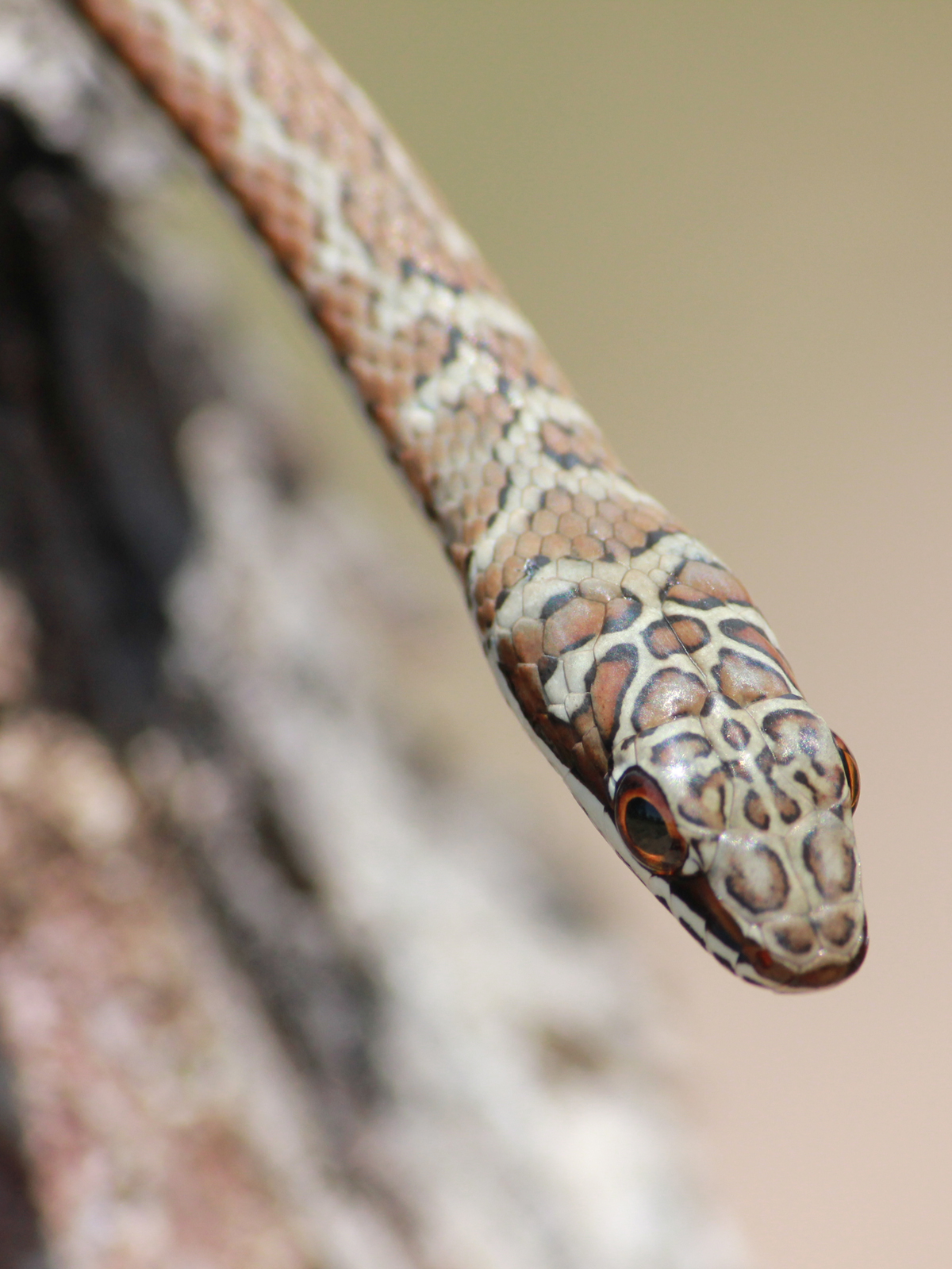

Conservation status
- Least Concern (IUCN 3.1)

Scientific classification
- Kingdom: Animalia
- Phylum: Chordata
- Class: Reptilia
- Order: Squamata
- Suborder: Serpentes
- Family: Psammophiidae
- Genus: Psammophis
- Species: P. subtaeniatus

Binomial name
- Psammophis subtaeniatus Peters, 1882

Synonyms
- Psammophis sibilans var. subtaeniata Peters, 1882; Psammophis bocagii Boulenger, 1895

= Psammophis subtaeniatus =

Snake species

Psammophis subtaeniatus, the western yellow-bellied sand snake, is a snake found in northern Southern Africa; more specifically the north of KwaZulu-Natal and further north to Mozambique, Zimbabwe, Gauteng, North West, Limpopo, and Eswatini. It is also found in eastern and northern Botswana, northern Namibia, Angola, and Zambia.

It is also known as the striped sand snake and in Afrikaans as the westelike streeppenssandslang.

The snake is oviparous and lays 4 to 10 eggs in summer. The young are about 20 cm long when they hatch. The snake's venom is not considered harmful and poses no danger to humans.
