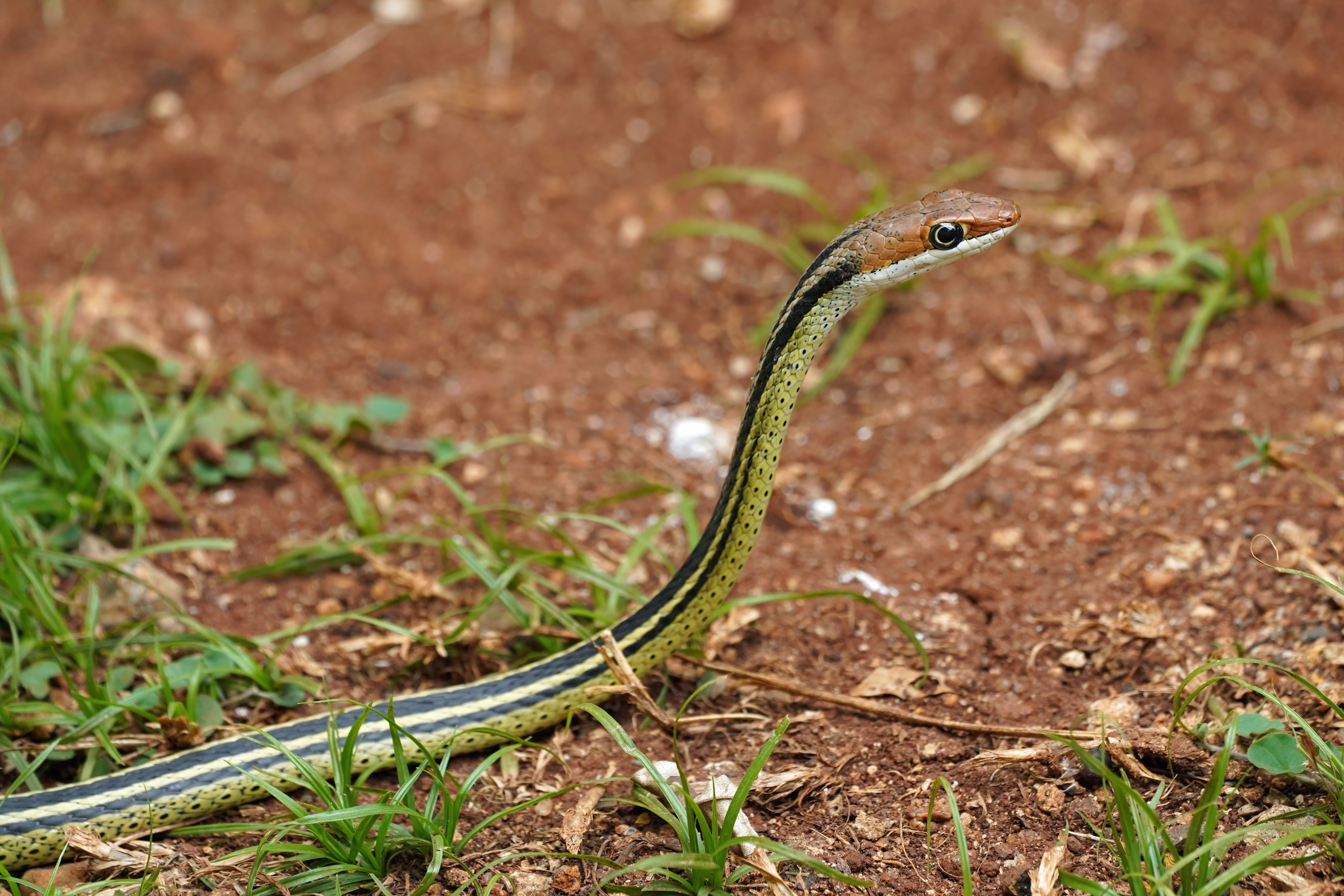
- Psammophis punctulatus in captivity at Nairobi Snake Park, Kenya

Conservation status
- Least Concern (IUCN 3.1)

Scientific classification
- Kingdom: Animalia
- Phylum: Chordata
- Class: Reptilia
- Order: Squamata
- Suborder: Serpentes
- Family: Psammophiidae
- Genus: Psammophis
- Species: P. punctulatus

Binomial name
- Psammophis punctulatus Duméril, Bibron & Duméril, 1854

Synonyms
- Dendrophis furcata Bianconi, 1859; Psammophis punctulatus trivirgatus Peters, 1878

= Psammophis punctulatus =

Species of snake

Psammophis punctulatus, commonly known as the speckled sand snake or speckled sand racer, is a species of snake in the family Psammophiidae. It is a large and fast-moving diurnal species native to east and north-east Africa, from Egypt in the north to Tanzania in the south.

== Distribution and habitat ==
Psammophis punctulatus is widespread in east and north-east Africa, ranging from Egypt in the north through Sudan, Ethiopia, Eritrea, Djibouti, Somalia, Kenya, and South Sudan, with the southernmost point of its range ending in northern Tanzania. It inhabits dry savanna, semi-desert, and scrubland habitats from sea level to altitudes of around 1,400 m (4,600 ft). It is somewhat tolerant of human-modified habitats such as agricultural land and urban areas with gardens or hedges.

== Description ==
Psammophis punctulatus is a distinctive long, thin snake with a reddish or orange head and bold longitudinal black and yellow stripes. Adults typically grow to 1–1.4 m (3 ft 3 in – 4 ft 7 in) long, with the largest specimens reaching 1.9 m (6 ft 3 in) long. The body is slim and cylindrical with a very long, thin tail making up one third of the total length. The elongate head is dull red or orange above and white below with rounded pupils and golden-yellow irises. The body is yellow, or grey in juveniles, with three black longitudinal stripes. The underside and flanks are white or grey with black speckles.

== Ecology ==
Psammophis punctulatus is a fast-moving and partially arboreal diurnal species. During the day it is known to actively hunt prey on the ground as a pursuit predator and to wait in trees and bushes as an ambush predator. It primarily feeds on lizards such as agamas, lacertids, and skinks, but is also capable of hunting other small vertebrates. At night it typically sleeps under groundcover, in holes, or sometimes in tree branches or hollows. It is an oviparous species, laying clutches of three to twelve eggs at a time.
