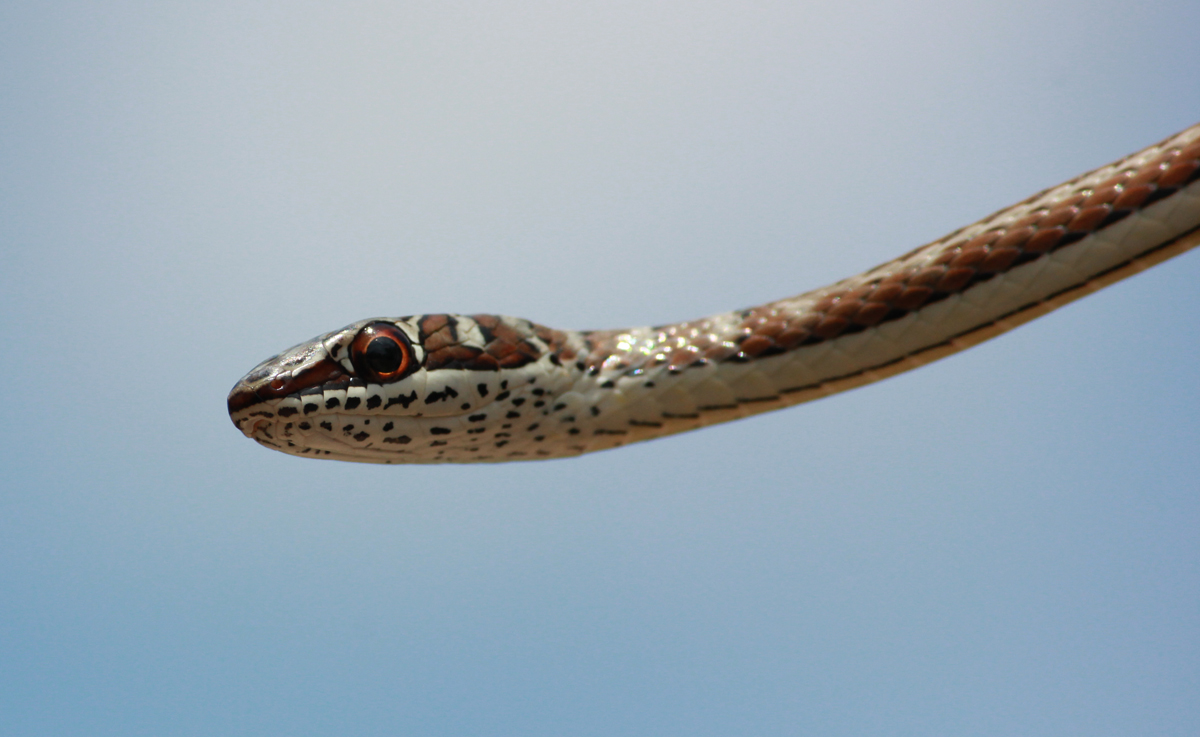
- Psammophis subtaeniatus, Limpopo, South Africa

Scientific classification
- Kingdom: Animalia
- Phylum: Chordata
- Class: Reptilia
- Order: Squamata
- Suborder: Serpentes
- Family: Psammophiidae
- Genus: Psammophis; Fitzinger, 1826

Species
- 33, see text.

= Psammophis =

Genus of snakes

Psammophis is a genus of snakes in the family Psammophiidae. The genus comprises 33 species, which are found in Africa and Asia. Psammophis are diurnal and prey on lizards and rodents which they actively hunt. All species in the genus are venomous, and the venom is considered mild and not dangerous to humans.

== Etymology ==
The generic name Psammophis was coined by the Austrian herpetologist Leopold Fitzinger in 1826, a compound of the Hellenistic Greek ψαμμο, "sand" + Classical Greek ὄΦις, "snake", thus sand-snake.

== Description ==
In the genus Psammophis the maxillary teeth are 10 to 13 in number, with one or two in the middle much enlarged and fang-like, preceded and followed by an interspace; the two posterior teeth are grooved. The anterior mandibular teeth are long, and the posterior teeth are small. The head is elongated and distinct from the neck, with an angular canthus rostralis. The eye is rather large, with a round pupil. The body is elongated and cylindrical with smooth dorsal scales in 15 or 17 rows at midbody, with apical pits. The ventral scales are rounded or obtusely angulate laterally, and the tail is long with the subcaudals in two rows.

== Geographic range ==
Thirty-three species of Psammophis are known, from Africa and southern Asia. One fossil species, Psammophis odysseus, is known to have inhabited the Iberian Peninsula during the Miocene, indicating that the genus managed to successfully colonize mainland Europe in the wake of the Messinian salinity crisis, only to be extirpated from there shortly afterwards.

== Behavior ==
Psammophis species are chiefly sand-snakes, but they are also found on low bushes.

== Diet ==
Species in the genus Psammophis feed principally on lizards.

== Reproduction ==
All species in the genus Psammophis are oviparous.

== Species ==
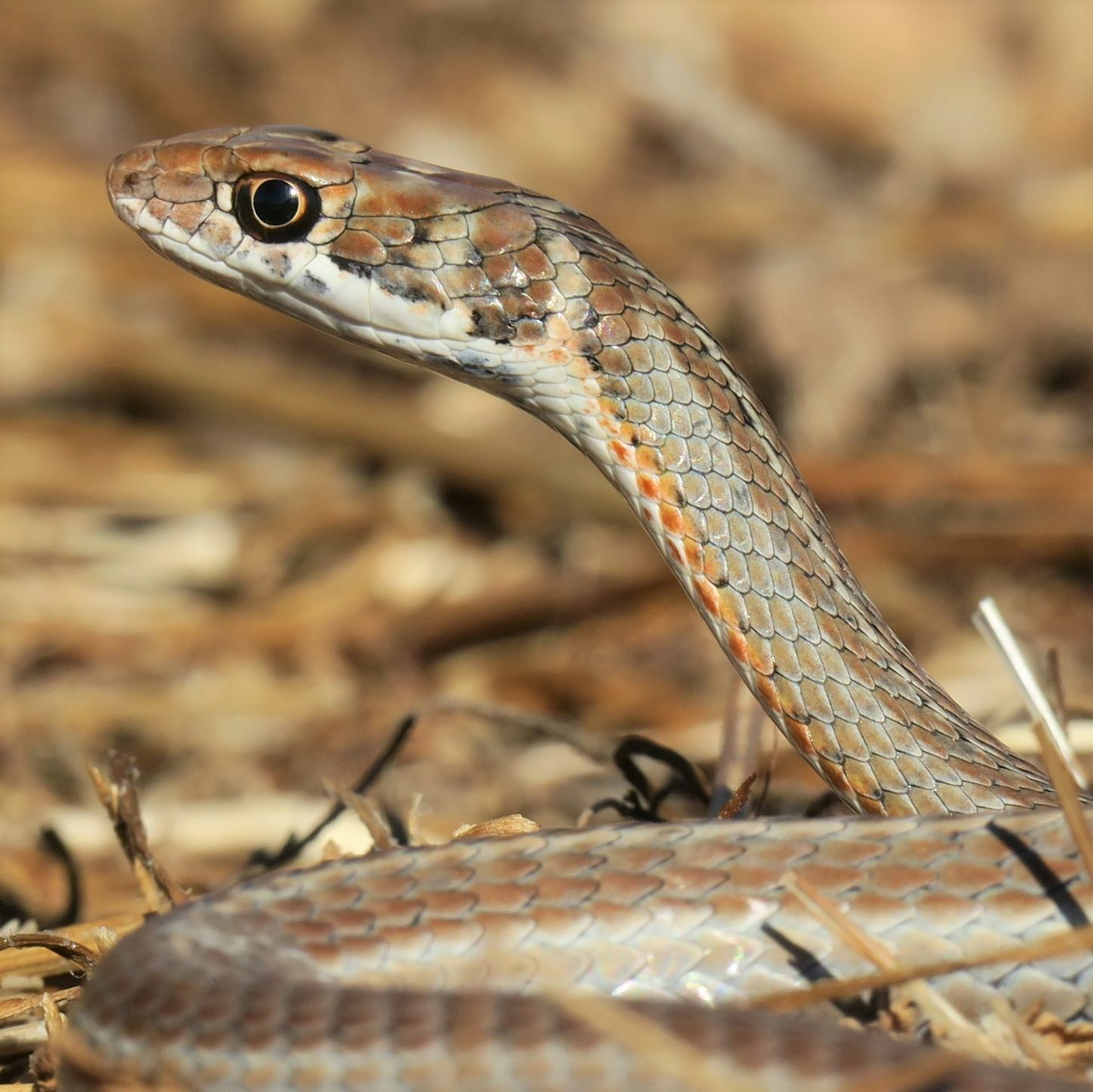
Psammophis notostictus

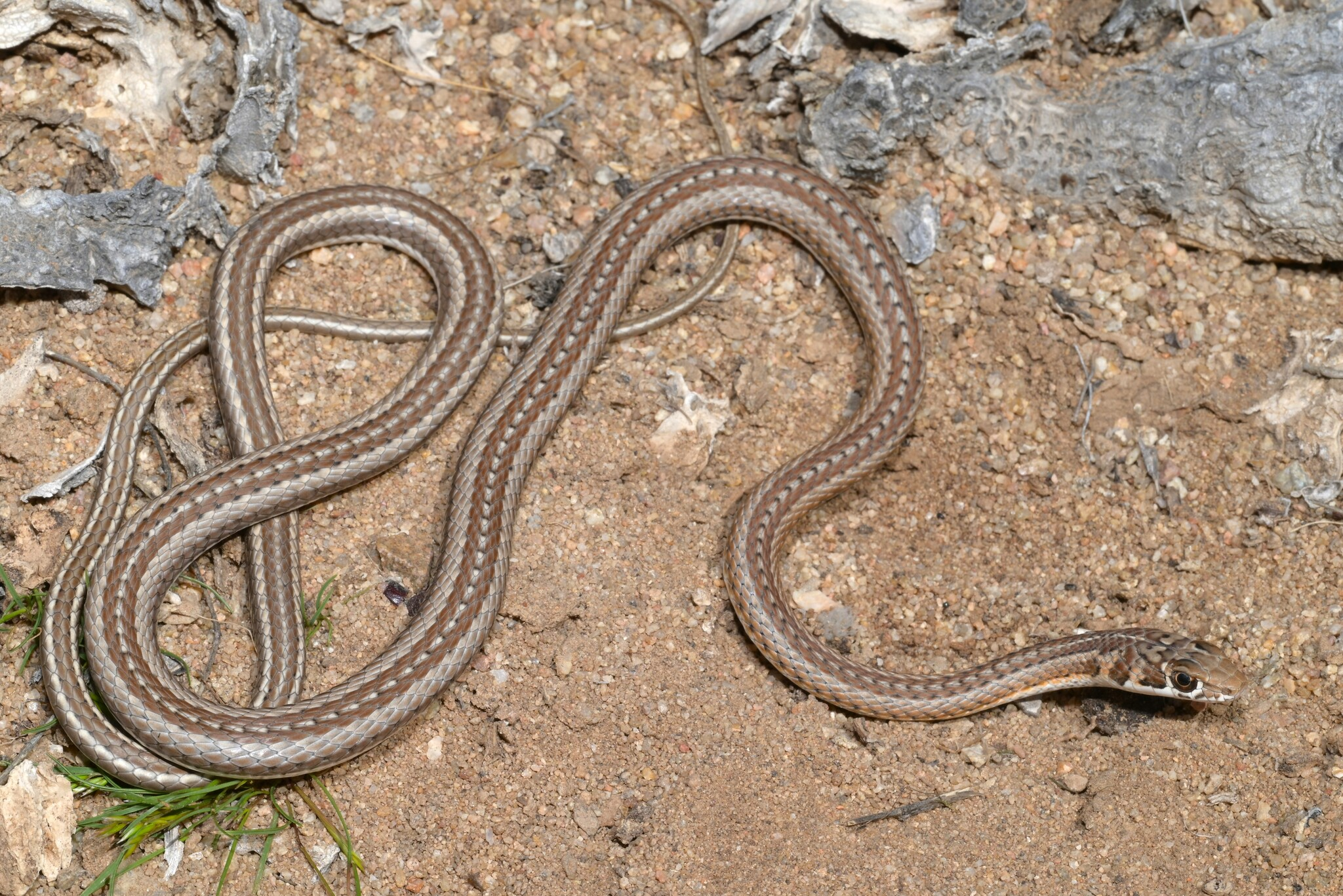
Psammophis notostictus

The following 35 extant species are recognized as being valid:

- Psammophis aegyptius Marx, 1958
- Psammophis afroccidentalis J.-F. Trape, Böhme & Mediannikov, 2019
- Psammophis angolensis (Bocage, 1872)
- Psammophis ansorgii Boulenger, 1905
- Psammophis biseriatus W. Peters, 1881
- Psammophis brevirostris W. Peters, 1881
- Psammophis condanarus (Merrem, 1820)
- Psammophis crucifer (Daudin, 1803)
- Psammophis elegans (Shaw, 1802)
- Psammophis indochinensis M.A. Smith, 1943
- Psammophis jallae Peracca, 1896
- Psammophis leightoni Boulenger, 1902
- Psammophis leithii Günther, 1869
- Psammophis leopardinus Bocage, 1887
- Psammophis lineatus (A.M.C. Duméril, Bibron & A.H.A. Duméril, 1854)
- Psammophis lineolatus (Brandt, 1838)
- Psammophis longifrons Boulenger, 1896
- Psammophis mossambicus W. Peters, 1882
- Psammophis notostictus W. Peters, 1867
- Psammophis orientalis Broadley, 1977
- Psammophis phillipsii (Hallowell, 1844)
- Psammophis praeornatus (Schlegel, 1837)
- Psammophis pulcher Boulenger, 1895
- Psammophis punctulatus A.M.C. Duméril, Bibron & A.H.A. Duméril, 1854
- Psammophis rukwae Broadley, 1966
- Psammophis schokari (Forskål, 1775)
- Psammophis sibilans (Linnaeus, 1758)
- Psammophis subtaeniatus W. Peters, 1882
- Psammophis sudanensis F. Werner, 1919
- Psammophis tanganicus Loveridge, 1940
- Psammophis trigrammus Günther, 1865
- Psammophis turpanensis M.-L. Chen, J.-L. Liu, B. Cai, J. Li, N. Wu & X.-G. Guo, 2021
- Psammophis zambiensis Hughes &Wade, 2002

=== Fossil species ===
- †Psammophis odysseus Georgalis, Szyndlar, 2022

Nota bene: A binomial authority in parentheses indicates that the species was originally described in a genus other than Psammophis.
