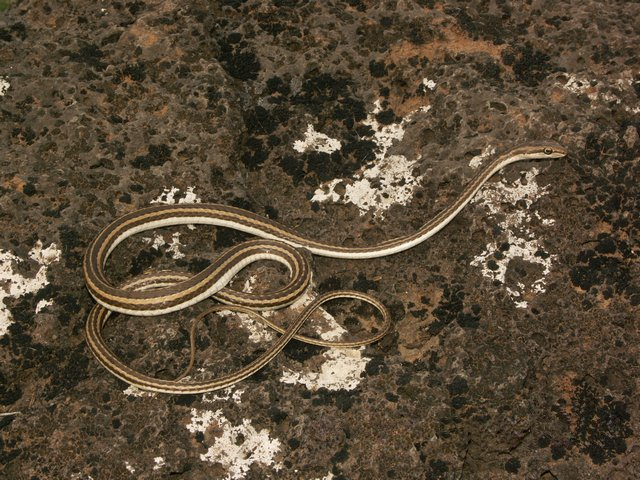

Conservation status
- Least Concern (IUCN 3.1)

Scientific classification
- Kingdom: Animalia
- Phylum: Chordata
- Class: Reptilia
- Order: Squamata
- Suborder: Serpentes
- Family: Psammophiidae
- Genus: Psammophis
- Species: P. schokari

Binomial name
- Psammophis schokari (Forskal, 1775)
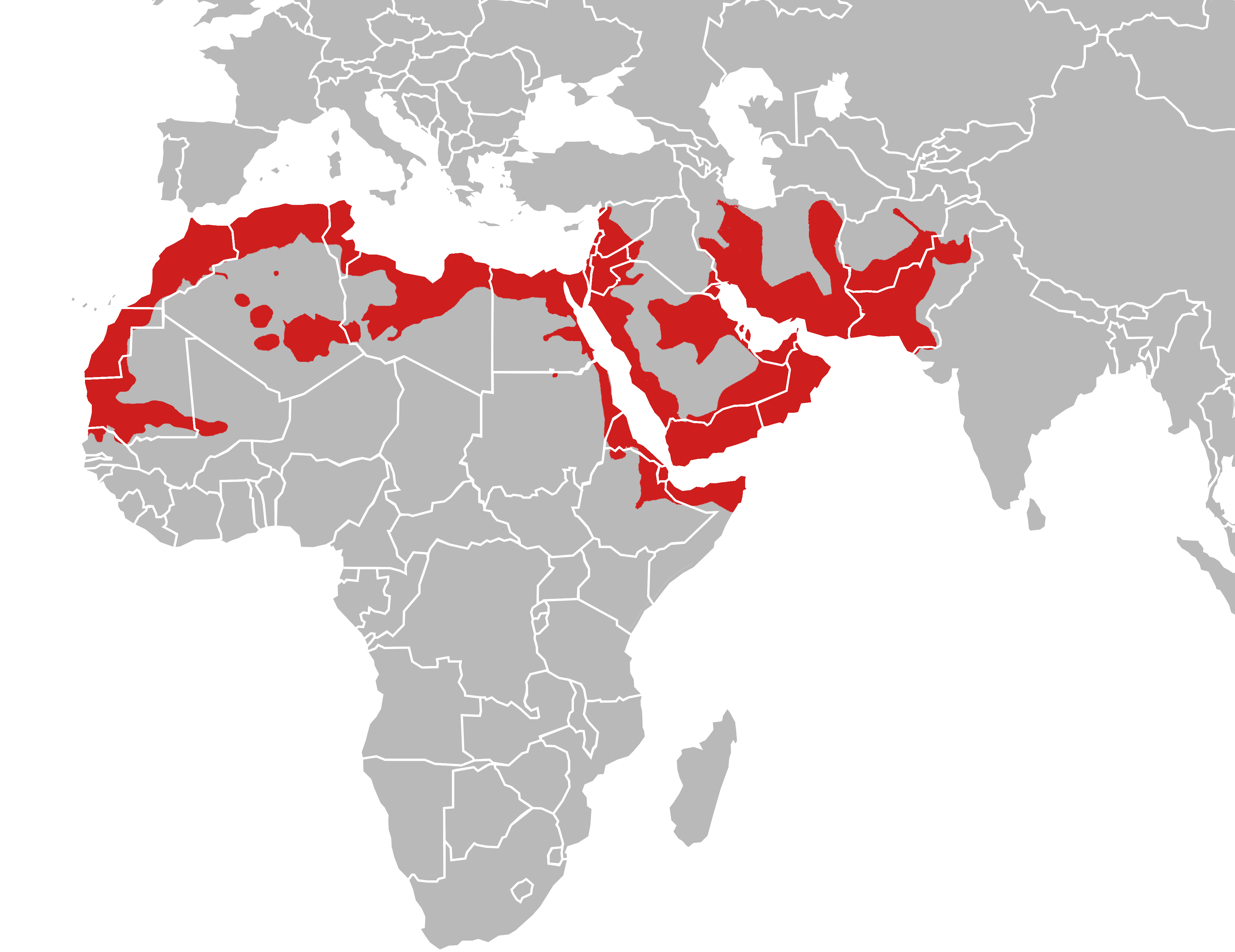

= Schokari sand racer =

Species of snake

The Schokari sand racer or Forskal sand snake (Psammophis schokari) is a species of psammophiid snake found in parts of Asia and Africa. Psammophis aegyptius has at times been considered a subspecies of Psammophis schokari but is presently considered a full species. Many people refer to snakes in the genus Psammophis as colubrids, but this is now known to be incorrect — they were once classified in the Colubridae, but our more sophisticated understanding of the relationships among the groups of snakes has led herpetologists to reclassify Psammophis and its relatives into Lamprophiidae, a family more closely related to Elapidae than to Colubridae.

== Distribution ==
Northwest India, Afghanistan (Leviton 1959: 461), Pakistan, south Turkmenistan, Western Sahara, Tunisia, Morocco, Algeria, Libya, Egypt, Jordan, Palestine, Israel, Lebanon, Mali, Mauritania, Nigeria, Sudan, Ethiopia, Eritrea, Somalia, Saudi Arabia, United Arab Emirates, Oman, Syria, kenya, Iraq, Iran (Kavir oDesert), and Yemen.

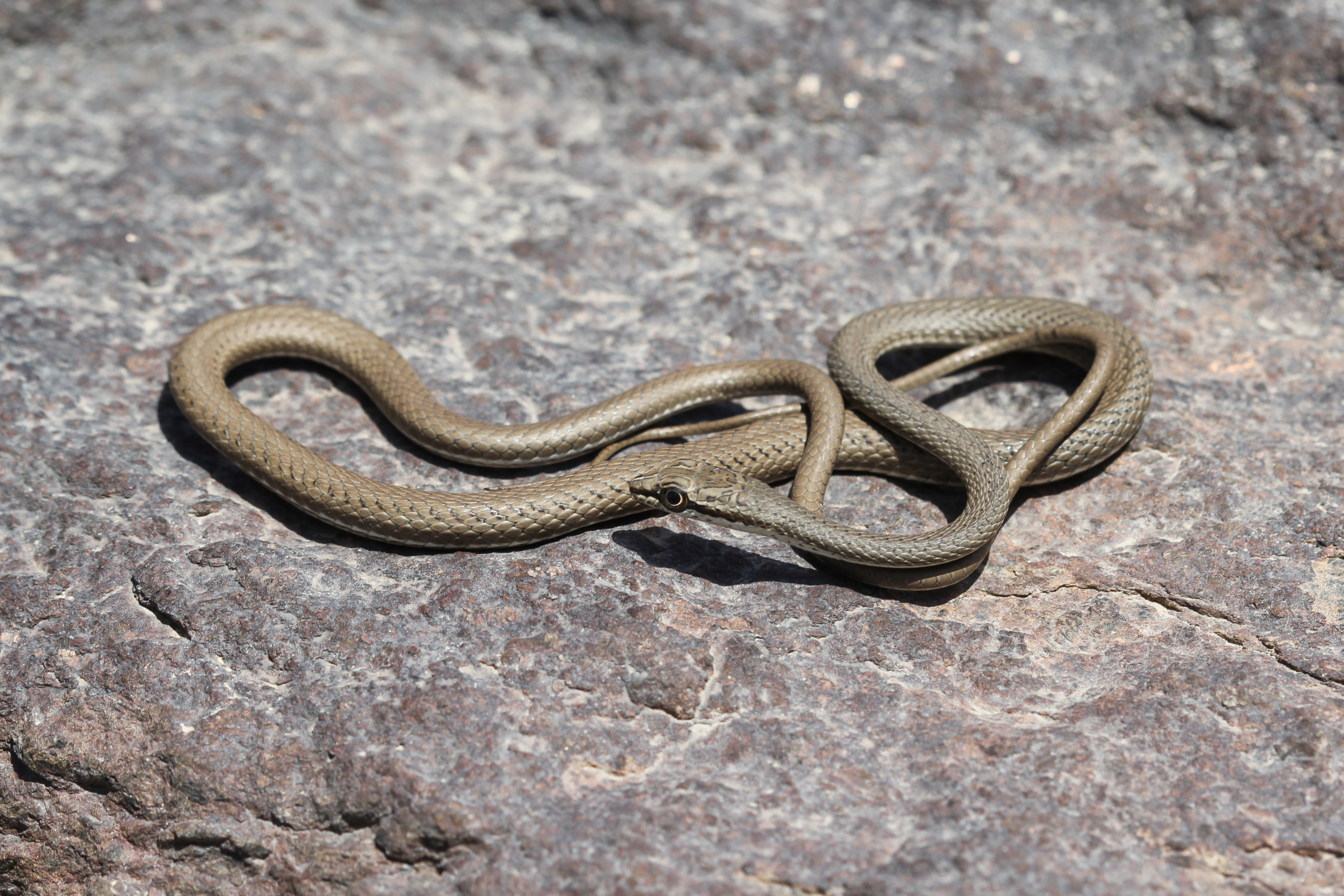
Psammophis schokari from United Arab Emirates

Type locality: Yemen.
