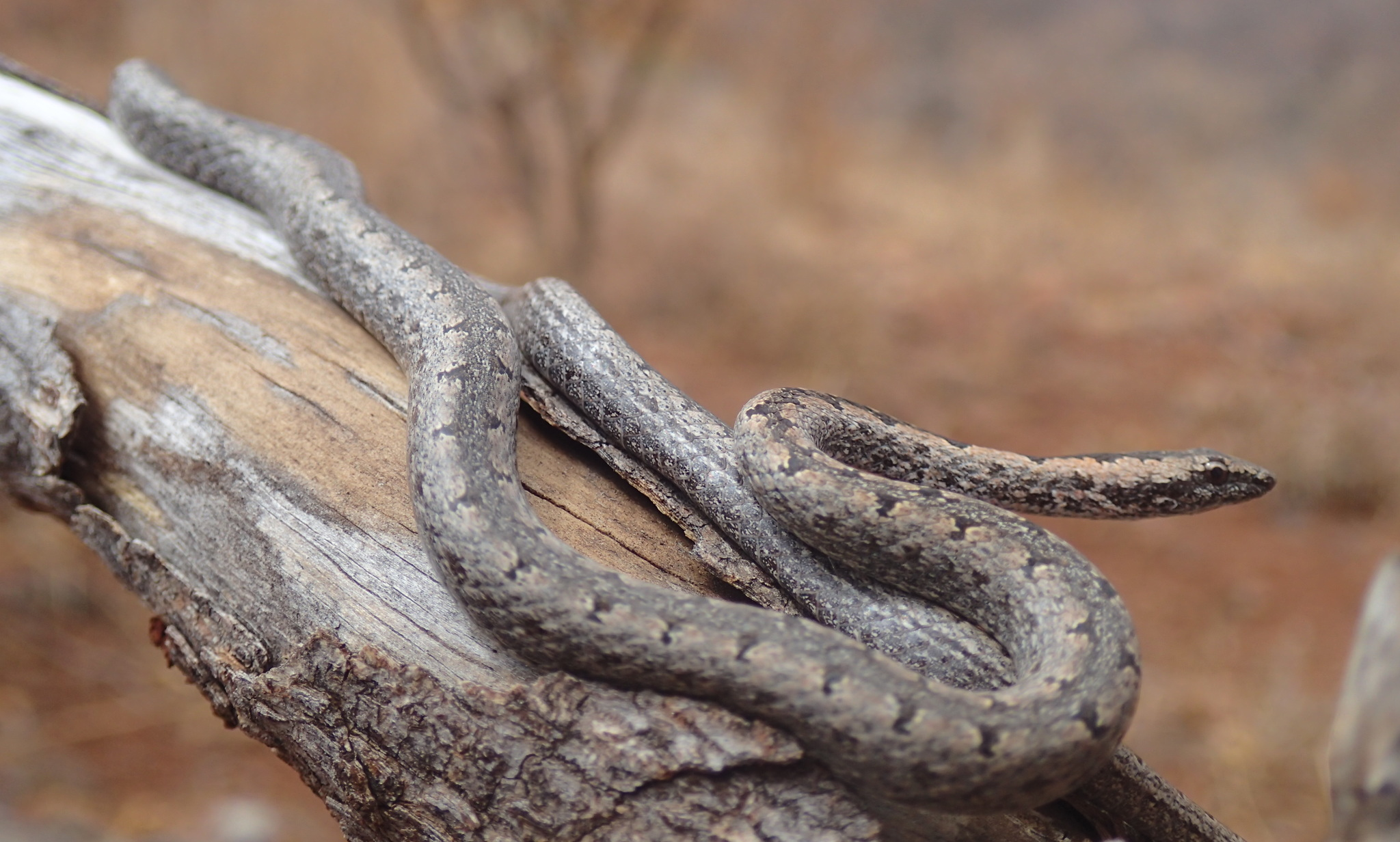
- Hemirhagerrhis nototaenia

Scientific classification
- Kingdom: Animalia
- Phylum: Chordata
- Class: Reptilia
- Order: Squamata
- Suborder: Serpentes
- Family: Psammophiidae
- Genus: Hemirhagerrhis; Boettger, 1893

= Hemirhagerrhis =

Genus of snakes

Hemirhagerrhis is a genus of snakes in the family Psammophiidae.

== Geographic range ==
The genus Hemirhagerrhis is endemic to Africa.

== Species ==
The genus Hemirhagerrhis contains four species which are recognized as being valid.

- Hemirhagerrhis hildebrandtii (W. Peters, 1878)
- Hemirhagerrhis kelleri Boettger, 1893
- Hemirhagerrhis nototaenia (Günther, 1864)
- Hemirhagerrhis viperina (Bocage, 1873)
- Nota bene: A binomial authority in parentheses indicates that the species was originally described in a genus other than Hemirhagerrhis.

== Etymology ==
The specific name, hildebrandtii, is in honor of German botanist Johann Maria Hildebrandt.

The specific name, kellerii, is in honor of Swiss naturalist Conrad Keller.

== Reproduction ==
Snakes of the genus Hemirhagerrhis are oviparous.
