= Kladirostratus =

Scientific classification
- Kingdom: Animalia
- Phylum: Chordata
- Class: Reptilia
- Order: Squamata
- Suborder: Serpentes
- Family: Psammophiidae
- Genus: Kladirostratus; Conradie, Keates & Edwards, 2019

Species
- K. acutus K. togoensis

Genus of snakes

Kladirostratus is a genus of snakes of the family Lamprophiidae. Members of this genus are known as Branch's beaked snakes.

== Taxonomy ==
Both members of Kladirostratus were originally placed in Psammophylax, but morphological and genetic evidence revealed that the species form a lineage that is sister to Psammophylax.

== Species ==
- Kladirostratus acutus (Günther, 1888) - striped beaked snake, beaked skaapstekker
- Kladirostratus togoensis (Matschie, 1893) - northern sharp-nosed skaapsteker
