= Trachylepis megalura =

Scientific classification
- Domain: Eukaryota
- Kingdom: Animalia
- Phylum: Chordata
- Class: Reptilia
- Order: Squamata
- Family: Scincidae
- Genus: Trachylepis
- Species: T. megalura

Binomial name
- Trachylepis megalura (Peters, 1878)

Species of lizard

The grass skink, grass-top skink, or long-tailed skink (Trachylepis megalura) is a species of skink found in Africa.
