= Dromophis =

Scientific classification
- Domain: Eukaryota
- Kingdom: Animalia
- Phylum: Chordata
- Class: Reptilia
- Order: Squamata
- Suborder: Serpentes
- Family: Lamprophiidae
- Subfamily: Lamprophiinae
- Genus: Dromophis; Schlegel, 1837

Species
- Dromophis lineatus Dromophis praeornatus

Genus of snakes

Dromophis is a genus of colubrid snakes. There are two commonly accepted species in the genus Dromophis:

- Lined Olympic Snake - Dromophis lineatus Dumeril, Bibron & Dumeril 1854
- Striped Swamp Snake - Dromophis praeornatus Schlegel, 1837
