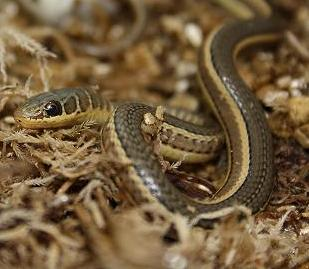

Conservation status
- Least Concern (IUCN 3.1)

Scientific classification
- Kingdom: Animalia
- Phylum: Chordata
- Class: Reptilia
- Order: Squamata
- Suborder: Serpentes
- Family: Psammophiidae
- Genus: Psammophis
- Species: P. sibilans

Binomial name
- Psammophis sibilans Linnaeus, 1758

Synonyms
- Coluber sibilans Linnaeus, 1758; Coluber gemmatus Shaw, 1802; Coluber moniliger Daudin, 1803; Natrix sibilans Merrem, 1820; Coluber auritus Geoffroy de St-Hilaire, 1829; Psammophis lacrymans Reuss, 1834

= Psammophis sibilans =

Species of snake

Psammophis sibilans, commonly known as the hissing sand snake or Egyptian hissing sand snake, is a snake from the family Psammophiidae. The species found across Northeast Africa.
