= Hemidactylus squamulatus =

Conservation status
- Least Concern (IUCN 3.1)

Scientific classification
- Kingdom: Animalia
- Phylum: Chordata
- Class: Reptilia
- Order: Squamata
- Suborder: Gekkota
- Family: Gekkonidae
- Genus: Hemidactylus
- Species: H. squamulatus

Binomial name
- Hemidactylus squamulatus Tornier, 1896

Synonyms
- Hemidactylus bocagei; Hemidactylus werneri; Hemidactylus tornieri; Hemidactylus alluaudi; Hemidactylus tropidolepis squamulatus; Hemidactylus tropidolepis barbouri; Hemidactylus barbouri; Hemidactylus tropidolepis floweri; Hemidactylus floweri

Species of gecko from eastern Africa (Tornier's leaf-toed gecko)

Hemidactylus squamulatus, also known as Tornier's leaf-toed gecko or Nyika gecko, is a species of gecko. It is found in eastern Africa (Ethiopia, Somalia, Kenya, Tanzania).
