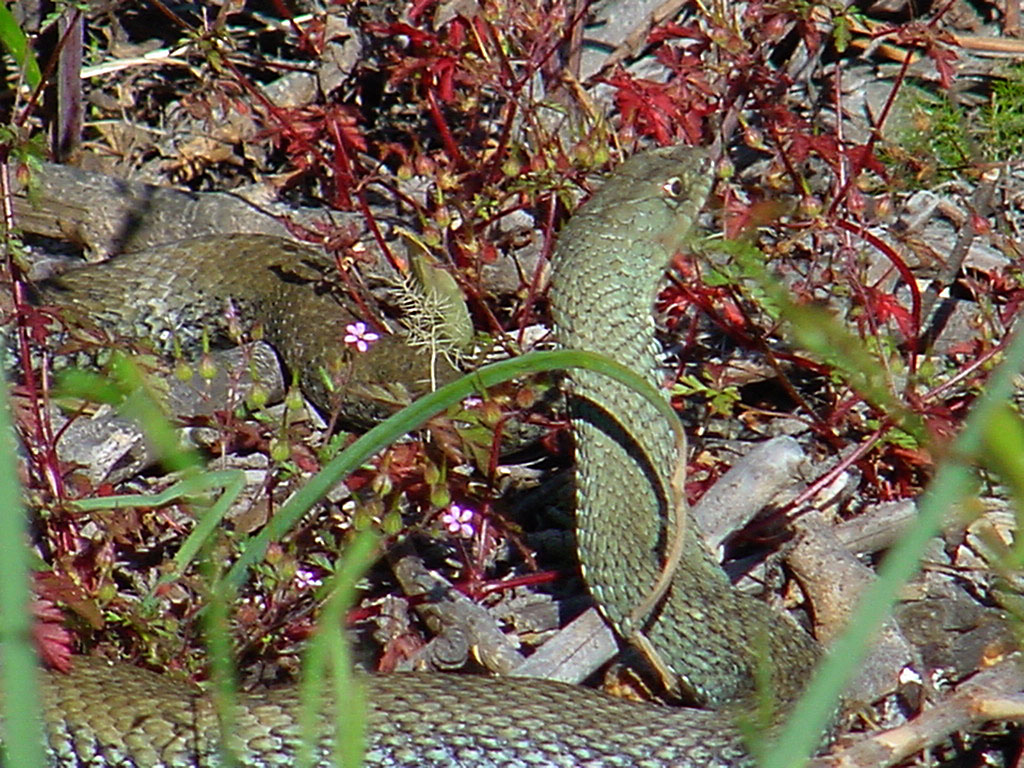
- Malpolon monspessulanus

Scientific classification
- Kingdom: Animalia
- Phylum: Chordata
- Class: Reptilia
- Order: Squamata
- Suborder: Serpentes
- Superfamily: Elapoidea
- Family: Psammophiidae; Bourgeois, 1968

Genera
- 8, see text

= Psammophiidae =

Family of snakes

Psammophiidae is a family of elapoid snakes. They were formerly placed as a subfamily of the Lamprophiidae, but have been more recently identified as a distinct family.

== Genera ==
It contains 8 genera:

- Dipsina Jan, 1862
- Hemirhagerrhis Boettger, 1893
- Kladirostratus Conradie, Keates & Edwards, 2019
- Malpolon Fitzinger, 1826
- Mimophis Günther, 1868
- Psammophis Fitzinger, 1826
- Psammophylax Fitzinger, 1843
- Rhamphiophis Peters, 1854
