= Southern rock agama =

There are two species of lizard named southern rock agama:

- Agama atra
- Agama knobeli
