= Insular agama =

There are two species of lizard named insular agama:

- Agama cristata
- Agama insularis
