= Agama lanzai =

Conservation status
- Least Concern (IUCN 3.1)

Scientific classification
- Kingdom: Animalia
- Phylum: Chordata
- Class: Reptilia
- Order: Squamata
- Suborder: Iguania
- Family: Agamidae
- Genus: Agama
- Species: A. lanzai

Binomial name
- Agama lanzai Wagner, Leaché, Mazuch & Böhme, 2013

Species of lizard

Agama lanzai is a species of lizard in the family Agamidae. It is a small lizard endemic to Somalia. It is similar to Agama bottegi. It is named after Benedetto Lanza.
