= Agama montana =

Conservation status
- Vulnerable (IUCN 3.1)

Scientific classification
- Kingdom: Animalia
- Phylum: Chordata
- Class: Reptilia
- Order: Squamata
- Suborder: Iguania
- Family: Agamidae
- Genus: Agama
- Species: A. montana

Binomial name
- Agama montana Barbour & Loveridge, 1928

Species of lizard

Agama montana, the montane rock agama, is a species of lizard in the family Agamidae. It is a small lizard found in Tanzania.
