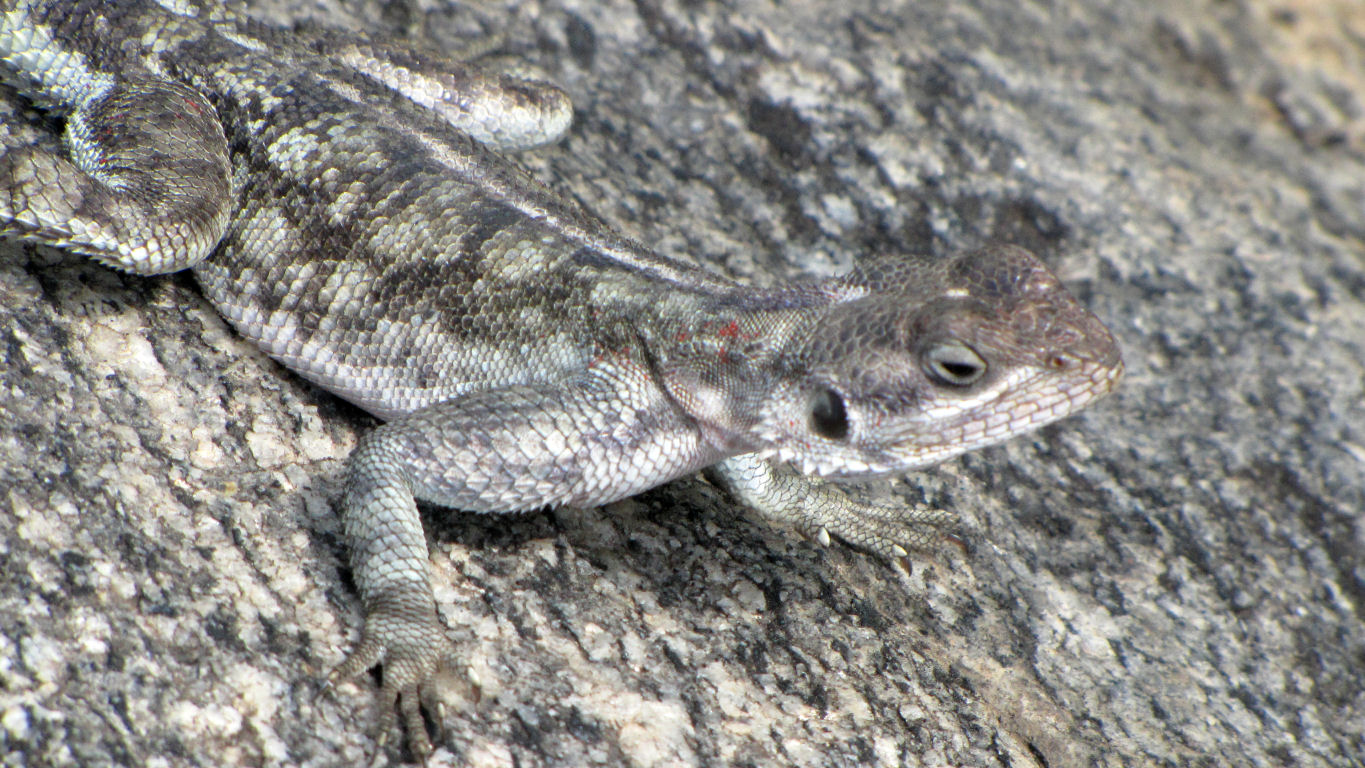
- Serengeti, Tanzania

Scientific classification
- Kingdom: Animalia
- Phylum: Chordata
- Class: Reptilia
- Order: Squamata
- Suborder: Iguania
- Family: Agamidae
- Genus: Agama
- Species: A. armata

Binomial name
- Agama armata Peters, 1855

Synonyms
- Agama hispida armata Agama hispida mertensi Agama aculeata armata

= Agama armata =

Species of lizard

The tropical spiny agama, northern ground agama, or Peter's ground agama (Agama armata) is a species of lizard from the family Agamidae, found in most of sub-Saharan Africa. The species is found in South Africa, Mozambique, Namibia, Botswana, Zambia, Eswatini, southern Democratic Republic of the Congo (Zaire), southwestern Kenya, and central Tanzania.

== Description ==
A small ground-dwelling agama, it reaches a length of 22 cm and is coloured grey, brown, or red with pale crossbars along the vertebral pale stripe. Displaying males' heads are coloured green or blue.

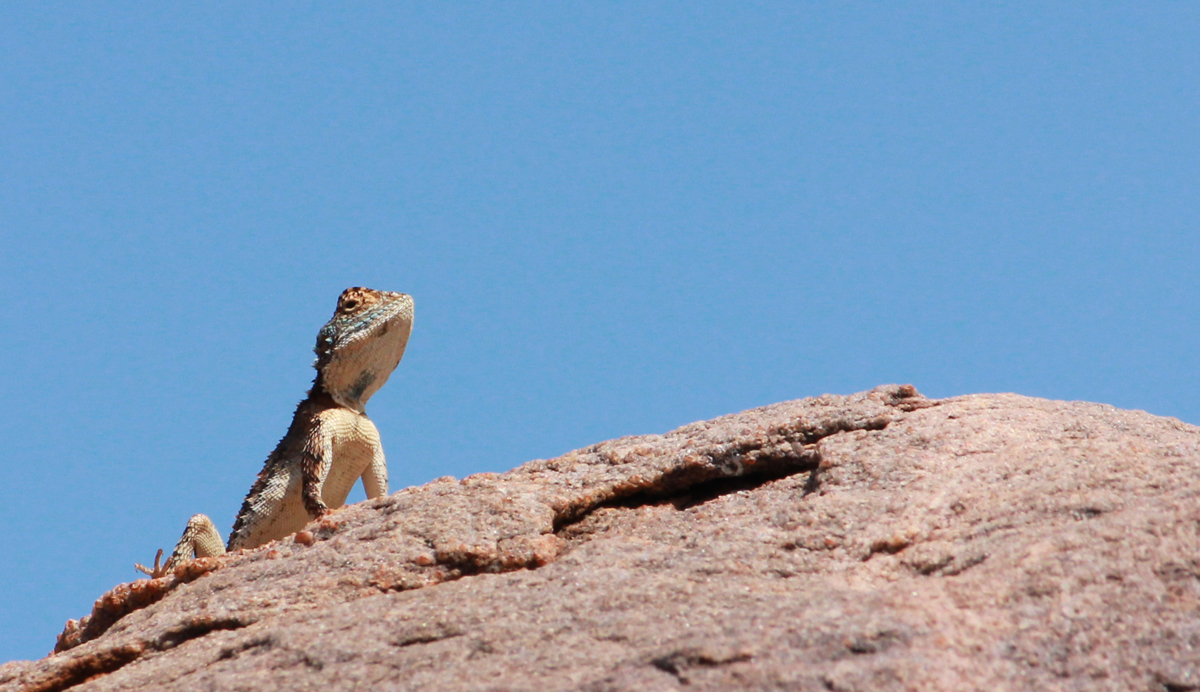
Agama armata displaying on rock, Soutpansberg, South Africa

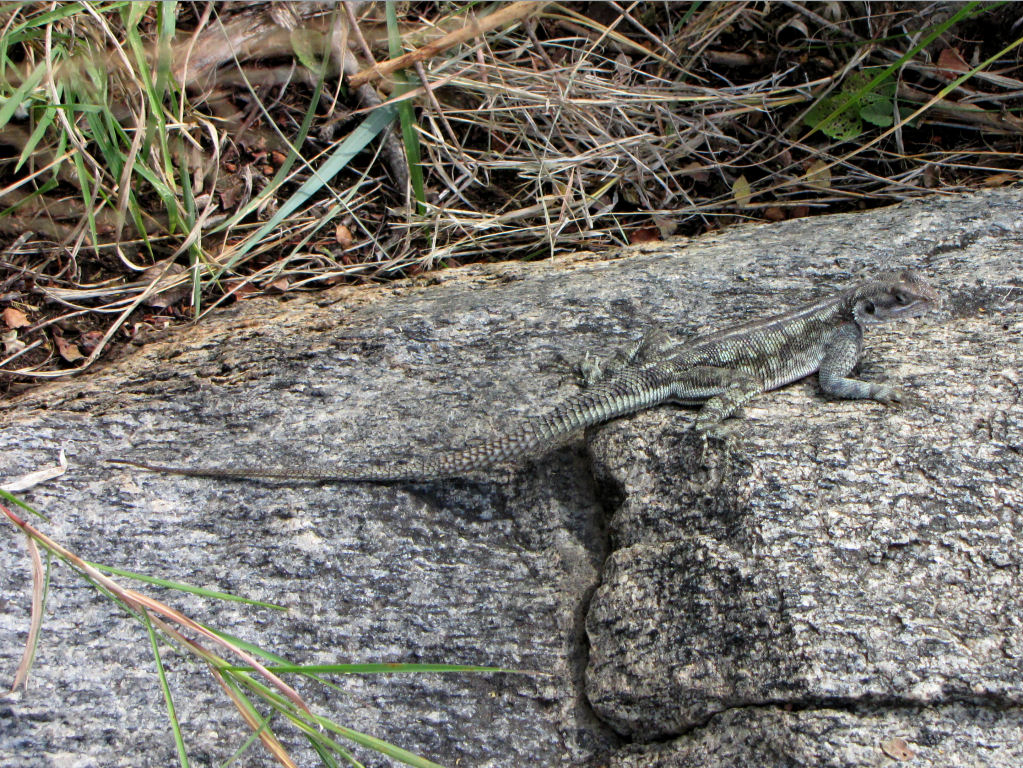
Full view, Serengeti National Park, Tanzania
