= Agama etoshae =

Etosha agama

Conservation status
- Least Concern (IUCN 3.1)

Scientific classification
- Kingdom: Animalia
- Phylum: Chordata
- Class: Reptilia
- Order: Squamata
- Suborder: Iguania
- Family: Agamidae
- Genus: Agama
- Species: A. etoshae

Binomial name
- Agama etoshae McLachlan, 1981

Species of lizard

Agama etoshae, known as the Etosha agama, is a species of lizard in the family Agamidae. It is a small lizard endemic to northern Namibia and sometimes found in southern Angola. The species is believed to use sandy substrate for the construction of burrows.
