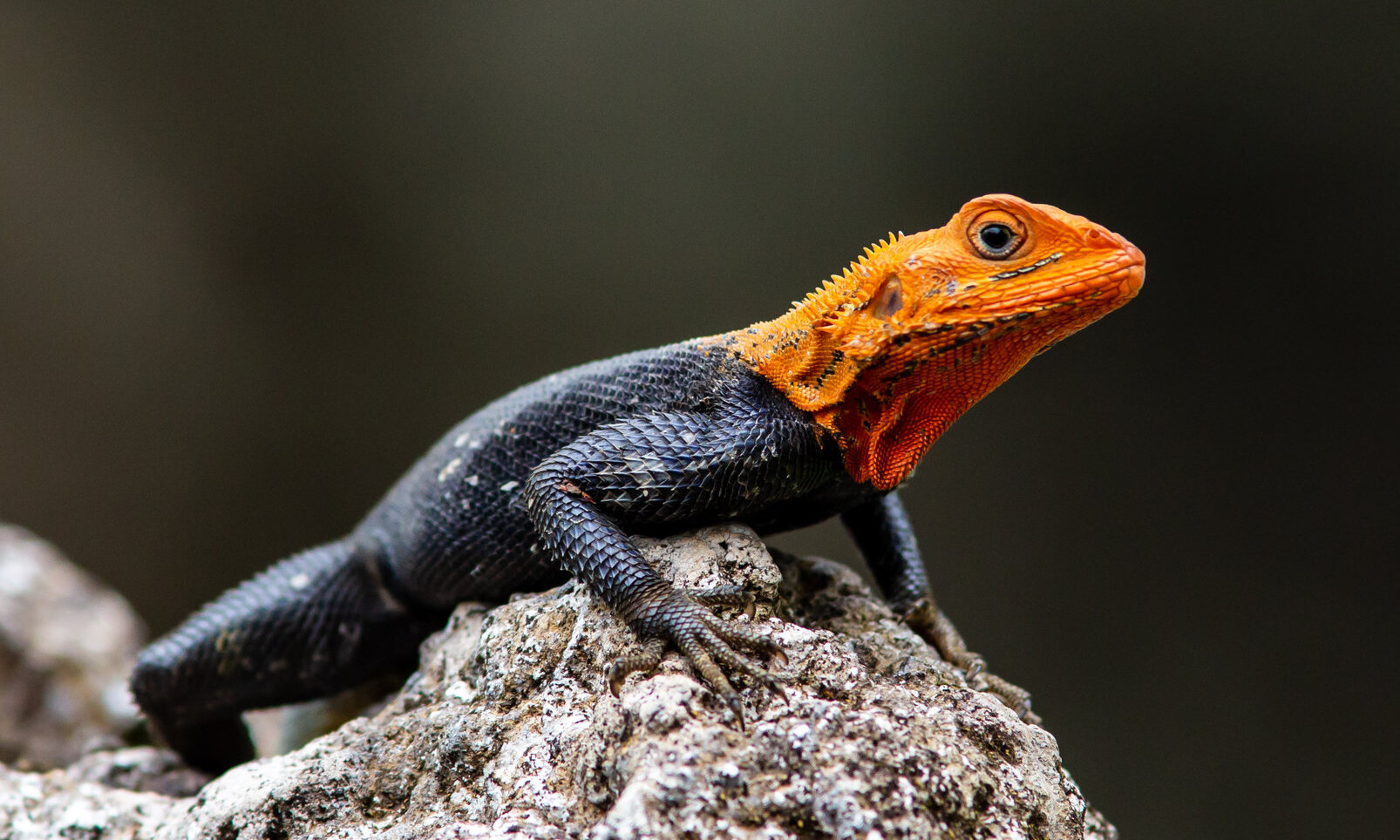
- Agama agama

Scientific classification
- Kingdom: Animalia
- Phylum: Chordata
- Class: Reptilia
- Order: Squamata
- Suborder: Iguania
- Family: Agamidae
- Subfamily: Agaminae
- Genus: Agama; Daudin, 1802

Type species
- Lacerta agama Linnaeus, 1758

Species
- See text

= Agama (lizard) =

Genus of reptiles

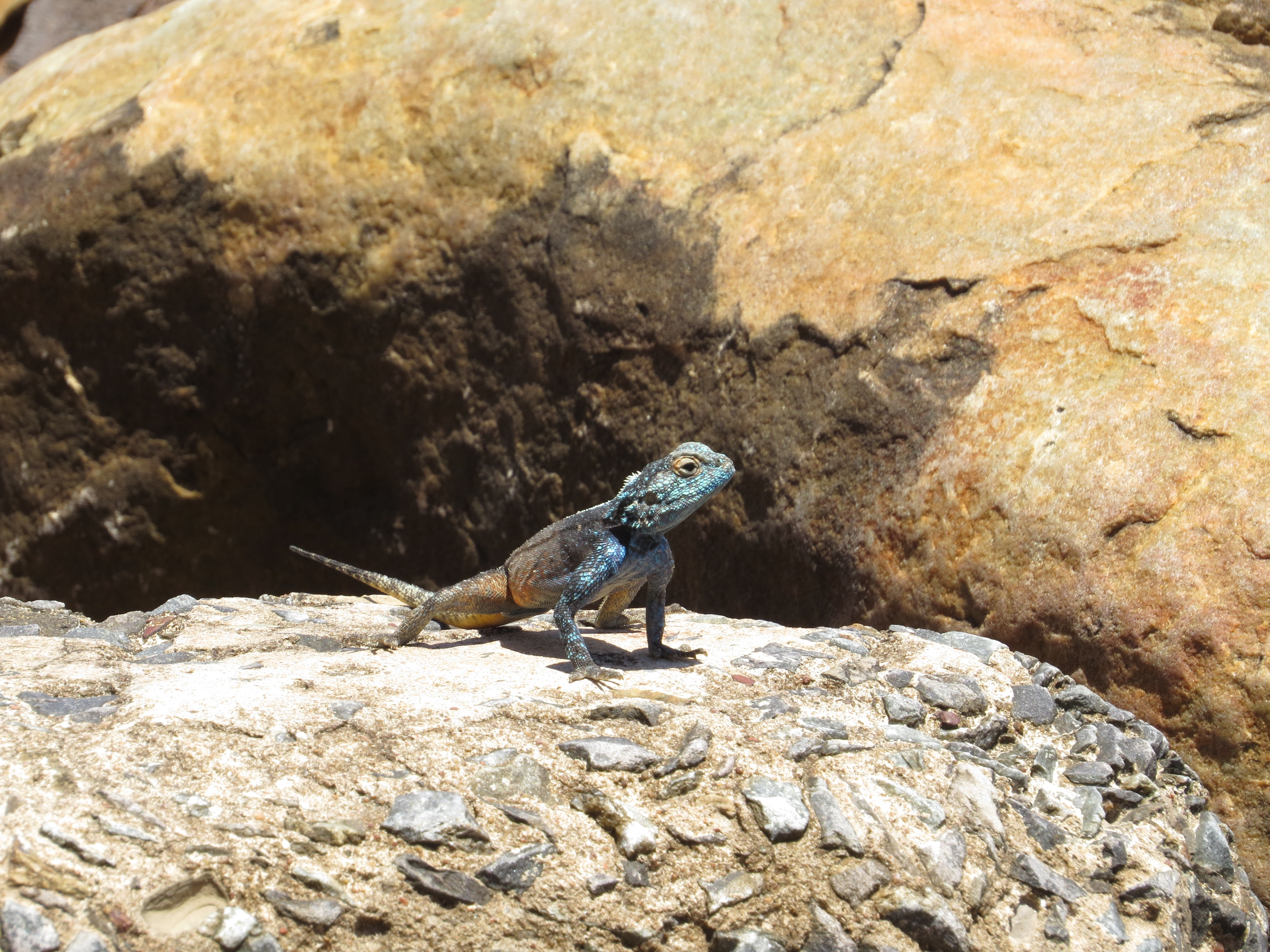
Agama atra male, showing the tympanum. Compare coloration with the picture of a female below

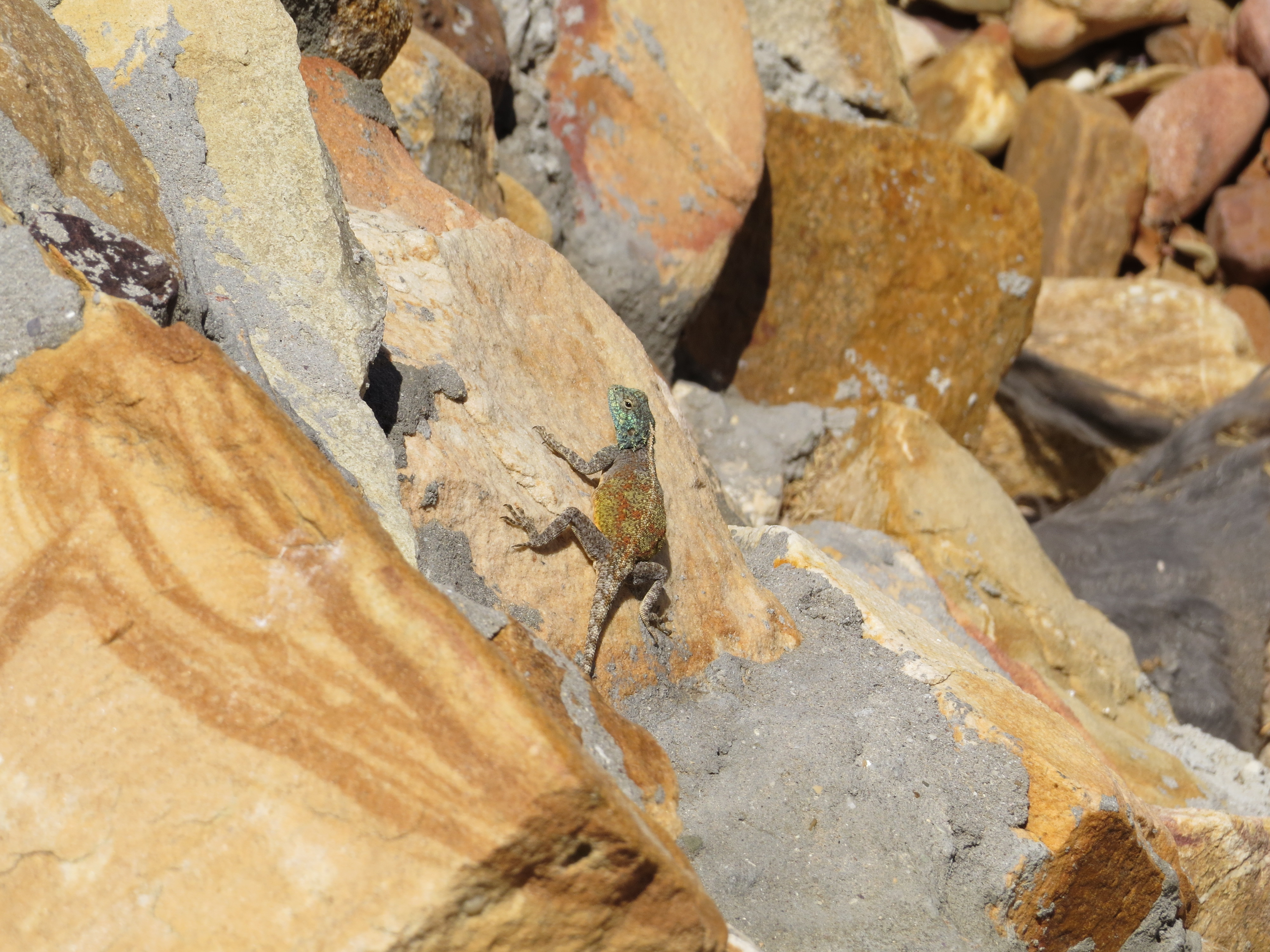
Agama atra gravid female, note how coloration differs from male.

Agama (from Sranan Tongo meaning "lizard") is a genus of small-to-moderate-sized, long-tailed, insectivorous Old World lizards. The genus Agama includes at least 37 species in Africa, especially sub-Saharan Africa, where most regions are home to at least one species. Eurasian agamids are largely assigned to genus Laudakia. The various species differ in size, ranging from about 12 to 30 centimetres (5 to 12 in) in length, when fully grown.

Their colour also differs between species, between genders, and according to mood; for example, a dominant male in display mode is far brighter than when it has been caught, beaten by another male, or otherwise alarmed. Females tend to be less colourful than the males of the species.

According to species, agamas live in forest, in bush, among rocks and on crags, but where their habitat has been cleared, or simply occupied by humans, some species also adapt to life in villages and compounds, for example inside the thatch of huts and other sheltering crevices. Agamids' hind legs generally are long and powerful; and the lizards can run and leap swiftly when alarmed.

Agamas are diurnal, active during the day. They can tolerate higher temperatures than most reptiles, but when temperatures approach 38 °C (100 °F) they generally shelter in the shade. Males frequently threaten each other by nodding, weaving, and displaying their brightest colours to establish dominance. If that is insufficient, they lash their tails and threaten each other with open jaws. The jaws are very powerful, and older males commonly have damaged tails as souvenirs of past combat. Females may sometimes chase and fight one another, and hatchlings mimic the adults' behaviour.

Agamas are mainly insectivorous, hunting prey by sight and snatching it opportunistically. Their incisor-like front teeth and powerful jaws are adapted to dealing with quite large, hard prey. They also may eat eggs of other lizards, and sometimes feed on vegetable matter, such as suitable grass, berries, and seeds.

Though not formally polygamous, dominant males commonly accommodate several females at a time in their territory. During courtship, and also when asserting his territory, the male bobs his head in display; this gives rise to some of the common names, such as Afrikaans koggelmander (literally, "little mocking man"). Females occasionally initiate courtship by offering their hindquarters to the male and provoking him to catch her. Typically the breeding season is timed for eggs to be laid during the season after the rains. Eggs are laid in clutches of up to 12, depending on species and the size of the female.

== Etymology and taxonomy ==
In the 10th edition of Systema Naturae of 1758, Linnaeus used the name Agama (pg. 288) as the species Lacerta Agama (with Agama originally capitalized to indicate a name in apposition rather than a Latin adjective, which he would have made lowercase). His own earlier description from 1749 was derived from Seba, who described and illustrated a number of lizards as Salamandra amphibia and Salamandra Americana, said to resemble in some ways a chameleon lizard and that supposedly came (in error) from "America." Seba did not use the term "agama", however. Linnaeus repeated Seba's error in stating that the lizards lived in the Americas ["habitat in America"], and he included other types of lizards shown and mentioned by Seba under his species name Agama.

Daudin later created the new genus, Agama, to incorporate various African and Asian lizards, as well as species from Mexico, the Caribbean, Central America, and South America. He noted that the name agama was used by inhabitants of Guiana for a species that he included in the genus Agama.

The word "agama" has been traced to West African Gbe languages as a name for the chameleon. The word was brought to Dutch Guiana (modern Suriname) by imported West African slaves and was then used in local creole languages for types of local lizards. Linnaeus may have taken the name "agama" from some unidentified source in the mistaken belief that the reptiles came from the Americas as indicated by Seba.

The name "agama" has no connection to either Greek agamos "unmarried" (as a supposed Latin feminine agama) or to Greek agamai "wonder" as sometimes suggested.

Because of the confusion over the actual taxon that was the basis for the name Agama agama, Wagner, et al. (2009) designated a neotype (ZFMK 15222), using a previously described specimen from Cameroon in the collection of the Zoologisches Forschungsmuseum Alexander Koenig in Bonn.

== Species ==
Listed alphabetically.

Image	Scientific name	Common name	Distribution
	Agama aculeata Merrem, 1820	ground agama	Namibia, Botswana, Zimbabwe, Republic of South Africa, Mozambique, S Angola, Tanzania, Zambia, Eswatini
	Agama africana (Hallowell, 1844)	West African rainbow Lizard	Liberia, Ivory Coast, Sierra Leone ?, Guinea
	Agama agama (Linnaeus, 1758)	red-headed rock agama, common agama, rainbow agama	Benin, Burkina Faso, Cameroon, Cape Verde Islands, Chad, Gabon, Ghana, Guinea, Guinea Bissau, Kenya, Liberia, Mali, Mauritania, Nigeria, Senegal, Togo, and Madagascar
	Agama anchietae Bocage, 1896	western rock agama, Anchieta's agama	S Congo (Brazzaville), Angola, Namibia, Republic of South Africa (NW Cape), Botswana
	Agama armata W. Peters, 1855	tropical spiny agama	South Africa, Mozambique, Namibia, Botswana, Zambia, Swaziland, southern Democratic Republic of the Congo (Zaire), southwestern Kenya, and central Tanzania
	Agama atra Daudin, 1802	southern rock agama	Southern Africa
	Agama bibronii Boettger, 1874	Bibron's agama	Morocco but it extends south to Western Sahara and east into eastern Algeria
	Agama bocourti Rochebrune, 1884	Bocourt's agama	Senegal, Gambia
	Agama boensis Monard, 1940		Guinea-Bissau, Guinea, Mali, Senegal
	Agama bottegi Boulenger, 1897	Somali agama	Mali; Mauritania; Niger; Senegal
	Agama boueti Chabanaud, 1917	Mali agama	Mali; Mauritania; Niger; Senegal
	Agama boulengeri Lataste, 1886	Boulenger's agama	Mali, Mauritania
	Agama caudospinosa Meek, 1910	Elmenteita rock agama	Kenya
	Agama cristata Mocquard, 1905	insular agama	Guinea (Conakry), Mali
	Agama dodomae Loveridge, 1923		Tanzania
	Agama doriae Boulenger, 1885	Nigeria agama	Ghana, Togo, Nigeria, Central African Republic to Eritrea and Ethiopia, N Cameroon, Sudan
	Agama etoshae McLachlan, 1981	Etosha agama	Namibia
	Agama finchi Böhme, Wagner, Malonza, Lötters & Köhler, 2005	Finch's agama, Malaba rock agama	W Kenya, Ethiopia
	Agama gracilimembris Chabanaud, 1918	Benin agama	Ghana, Benin, Nigeria, Cameroon, Central African Republic, probably in Chad (L. Chirio, pers. comm.), Mali, Guinea (Conakry), Burkina Faso
	Agama hartmanni W. Peters, 1869	Hartmann's agama	
	Agama hispida (Linnaeus, 1758)	common spiny agama, southern spiny agama, spiny ground agama	Republic of South Africa, Zimbabwe, Namibia, S Angola, Botswana, Mozambique, Malawi
	Agama insularis Chabanaud, 1918	insular agama	Rooma Island, Guinea
	Agama kaimosae Loveridge, 1935	Kakamega agama	Kenya
	Agama kirkii Boulenger, 1885	Kirk's rock agama	Malawi, Zambia, Zimbabwe, Mozambique, E Botswana, SW Tanzania
	Agama knobeli Boulenger & Power, 1921	southern rock agama	Namibia
	Agama lanzai Wagner, Leaché, Mazuch & Böhme, 2013		Somalia
	Agama lebretoni Wagner, Barej & Schmitz, 2009	Lebreton's agama	Cameroon, Equatorial Guinea, Gabon, Fernando Poo (Bioko Island), Nigeria
	Agama lionotus Boulenger, 1896	Kenyan rock agama	Tanzania, Uganda, Kenya, Ethiopia
	Agama lucyae Wagner & Bauer, 2011		N Ethiopia
	Agama montana Barbour & Loveridge, 1928	montane rock agama	Tanzania
	Agama mossambica W. Peters, 1854	Mozambique agama	Tanzania, Malawi, Zambia, Mozambique, E Zimbabwe
	Agama mucosoensis Hellmich, 1957	Mucoso agama	Angola (Mucoso, Dondo, and Libolo/Luati)
	Agama mwanzae Loveridge, 1923	Mwanza flat-headed rock agama	Tanzania, Rwanda, Kenya
	Agama parafricana S. Trape, Mediannikov & J. Trape, 2012		Benin; Ghana; Togo
	Agama paragama Grandison, 1968	false agama	N Nigeria, N Cameroon, Mali, Central African Republic, Ghana, Burkina Faso, Benin, probably in W Chad (L. Chirio, pers. comm.), Niger
	Agama persimilis Parker, 1942	painted agama, similar agama	Somalia, Ethiopia, E/NE Kenya
	Agama picticauda (W. Peters, 1877)	Peter's rock agama	Gabon
	Agama planiceps W. Peters, 1862	Namib rock agama	Namibia (Damaraland, Kaokoveld)
	Agama robecchii Boulenger, 1892	Robecchi's agama	N Somalia, E Ethiopia
	Agama rueppelli Vaillant, 1882	Rüppell's agama, arboreal agama	Somalia, E Ethiopia, Kenya, S Sudan
	Agama sankaranica Chabanaud, 1918	Senegal agama	Guinea (Conakry), Nigeria, Ivory Coast, Ghana, Burkina Faso, Benin, Togo, Mali, Cameroon (?), Senegal, Niger
	Agama somalica Wagner, Leaché, Mazuch & Böhme, 2013		NE Somalia
	Agama spinosa Gray, 1831	Gray's agama, spiny agama	Egypt, Sudan, N Ethiopia, Eritrea, Djibouti, N Somalia
	Agama tassiliensis Geniez, Padial & Crochet, 2011		Mali (Adrar des Ifoghas), Niger (Aïr Mountains), Algeria (Ahaggar Mountains), Libya (Tassili n’Ajjer)
	Agama turuensis Loveridge, 1932		Tanzania
	Agama wachirai Malonza, Spawls, Finch & Bauer, 2021	Marsabit rock agama	Kenya
	Agama weidholzi Wettstein, 1932	Gambia agama	Senegal, Gambia, W Mali, Guinea-Bissau

Nota bene: A binomial authority in parentheses indicates that the species was originally described in a genus other than Agama.
