= Agama hartmanni =

Conservation status
- Least Concern (IUCN 3.1)

Scientific classification
- Kingdom: Animalia
- Phylum: Chordata
- Class: Reptilia
- Order: Squamata
- Suborder: Iguania
- Family: Agamidae
- Genus: Agama
- Species: A. hartmanni

Binomial name
- Agama hartmanni W. Peters, 1869

Synonyms
- Agama cornii Scortecci, 1928

Species of lizard

Agama hartmanni, also known commonly as Hartmann's agama, is a species of lizard in the family Agamidae. It is a small lizard native to northeastern Africa.

== Etymology ==
The specific name, hartmanni, is in honor of German anthropologist Karl Eduard Robert Hartmann (1832–1893).

== Geographic range ==
A. hartmanni is found in Eritrea, Sudan, and South Sudan.

== Habitat ==
The preferred natural habitats of A. hartmanni are rocky desert, shrubland, and savanna.

== Description ==
Medium-sized for its genus, A. hartmanni may attain a snout-to-vent length (SVL) of 9 cm (3.5 in), and a total length (including tail) of 23 cm (9.1 in).

== Reproduction ==
A. hartmanni is oviparous.
