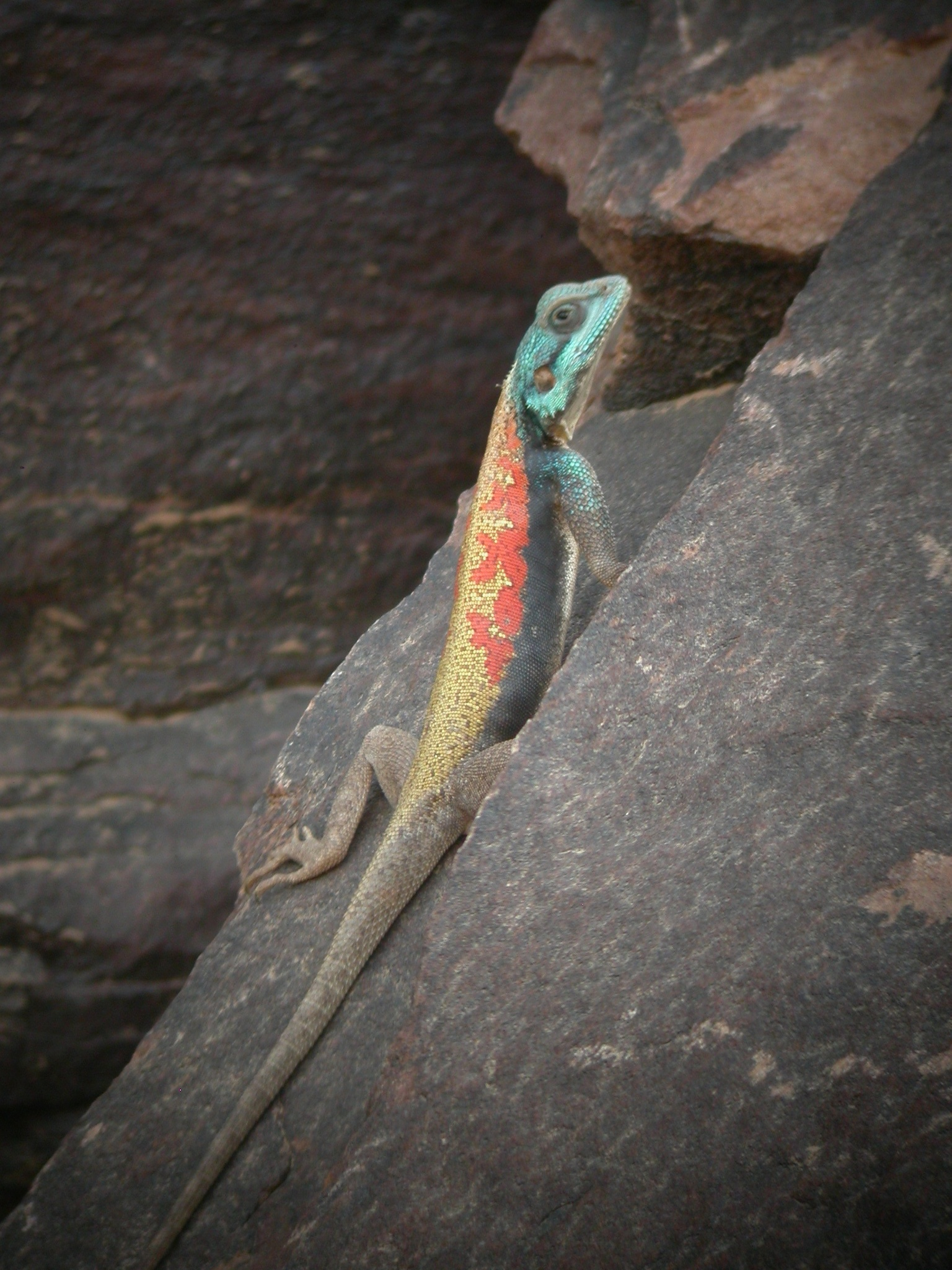

Conservation status
- Least Concern (IUCN 3.1)

Scientific classification
- Kingdom: Animalia
- Phylum: Chordata
- Class: Reptilia
- Order: Squamata
- Suborder: Iguania
- Family: Agamidae
- Genus: Agama
- Species: A. boulengeri

Binomial name
- Agama boulengeri Lataste, 1886

= Agama boulengeri =

Species of lizard

Agama boulengeri, also known commonly as Boulenger's agama, is a species of lizard in the family Agamidae. The species is native to western Africa.

== Etymology ==
The specific name, boulengeri, is in honor of Belgian-born British herpetologist George Albert Boulenger.

== Geographic range ==
A. boulengeri is found in Mali and Mauritania.

== Habitat ==
The preferred natural habitats of A. boulengeri are rocky areas and wetlands.

== Description ==
A. boulengeri is a small lizard. Dorsally, it is grayish brown, with yellowish specks. Ventrally, it is yellowish. It may attain a snout-to-vent length (SVL) of about 10 cm (3.9 in), with a tail length of about 14 cm (5.5 in).

== Behavior ==
A. boulengeri is terrestrial and diurnal.

== Reproduction ==
A. boulengeri is oviparous.
