= Agama rueppelli =

Conservation status
- Least Concern (IUCN 3.1)

Scientific classification
- Kingdom: Animalia
- Phylum: Chordata
- Class: Reptilia
- Order: Squamata
- Suborder: Iguania
- Family: Agamidae
- Genus: Agama
- Species: A. rueppelli

Binomial name
- Agama rueppelli (Vaillant, 1882)

Subspecies
- A. r. rueppelli Vaillant, 1882; A. r. occidentalis Parker, 1932; A. r. septentrionalis Parker, 1932

Synonyms
- Agama rueppellii [sic]; Agama ruppelli [sic]; Agama vaillanti

Species of lizard

Agama rueppelli, commonly known as the arboreal agama or Rüppell's agama, is a species of lizard in the family Agamidae. The species is endemic to East Africa.

== Etymology ==
The specific name, rueppelli, and one of the common names, Rüppell's agama, are in honor of German naturalist Eduard Rüppell.

== Geographic range ==
A. rueppelli is found in eastern Ethiopia, northern Kenya, and Somalia.

== Description ==
A small brown or reddish agama, A. rueppelli may reach a total length (including tail) of 28 centimetres (11 in). It has darker crossbars down the back, with a pale vertebral stripe.
