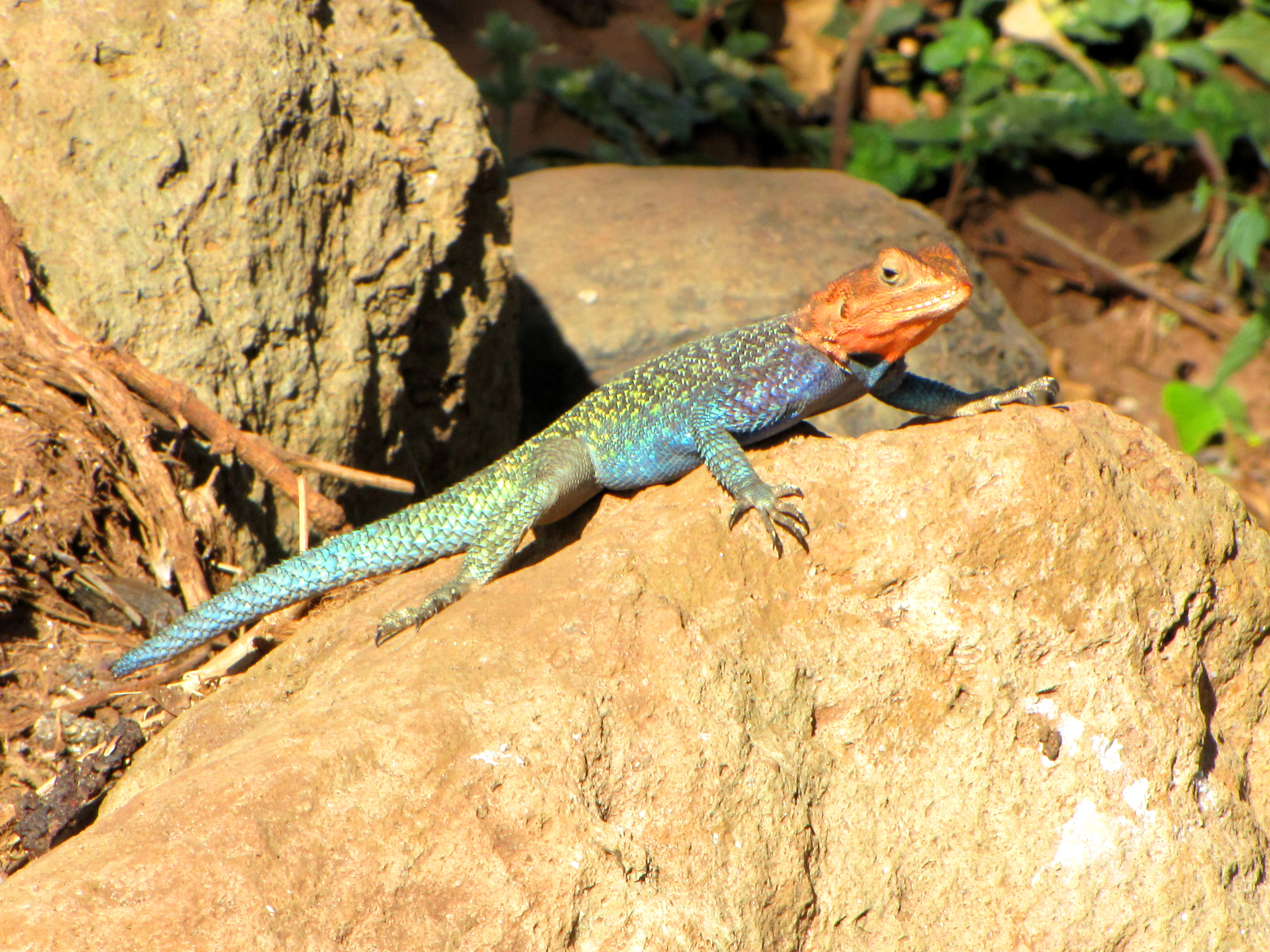
- Male, Agama lionotus elgonis, Serengeti, Tanzania
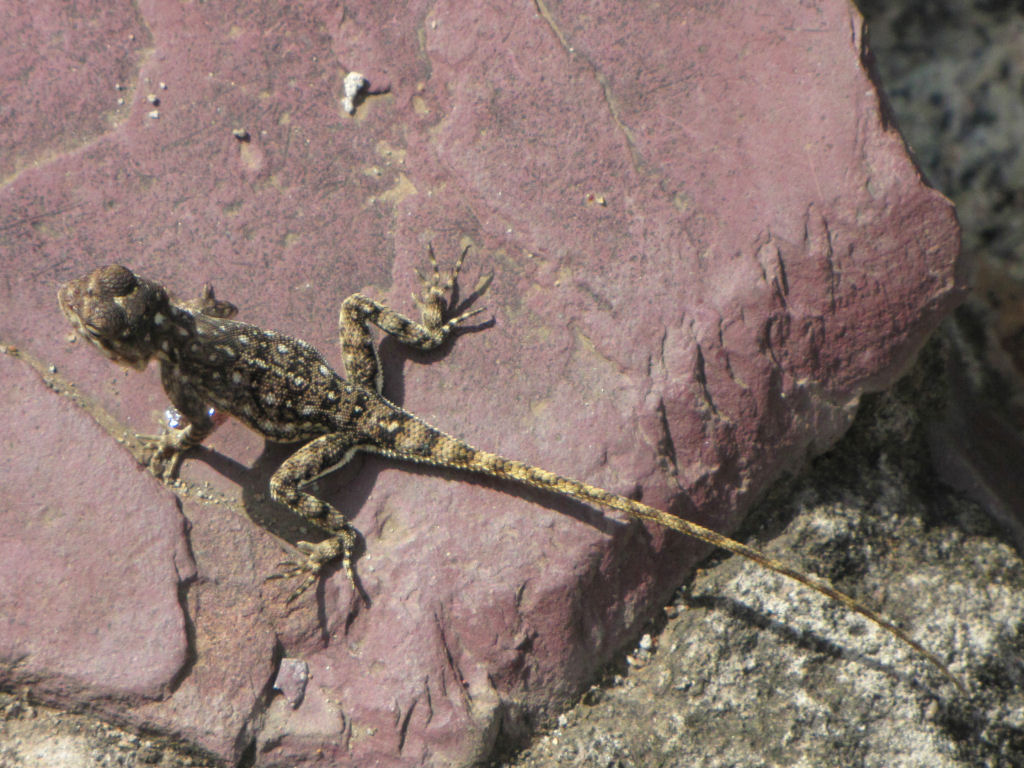
- Female, Agama lionotus elgonis, Serengeti, Tanzania

Conservation status
- Least Concern (IUCN 3.1)

Scientific classification
- Kingdom: Animalia
- Phylum: Chordata
- Class: Reptilia
- Order: Squamata
- Suborder: Iguania
- Family: Agamidae
- Genus: Agama
- Species: A. lionotus

Binomial name
- Agama lionotus Boulenger, 1896

= Agama lionotus =

Species of lizard

Agama lionotus is a species of lizard from the family Agamidae, found in Tanzania, Uganda, Kenya and Ethiopia. It is commonly referred to as the Kenyan rock agama, and is often confused with the red-headed rock agama.

== Subspecies ==
Its subspecies are:

- A. l. elgonis Lönnberg, 1922
- A. l. lionotus Boulenger, 1896
- A. l. ufipae Loveridge, 1923
