= Agama boueti =

Conservation status
- Least Concern (IUCN 3.1)

Scientific classification
- Kingdom: Animalia
- Phylum: Chordata
- Class: Reptilia
- Order: Squamata
- Suborder: Iguania
- Family: Agamidae
- Genus: Agama
- Species: A. boueti

Binomial name
- Agama boueti Chabanaud, 1917
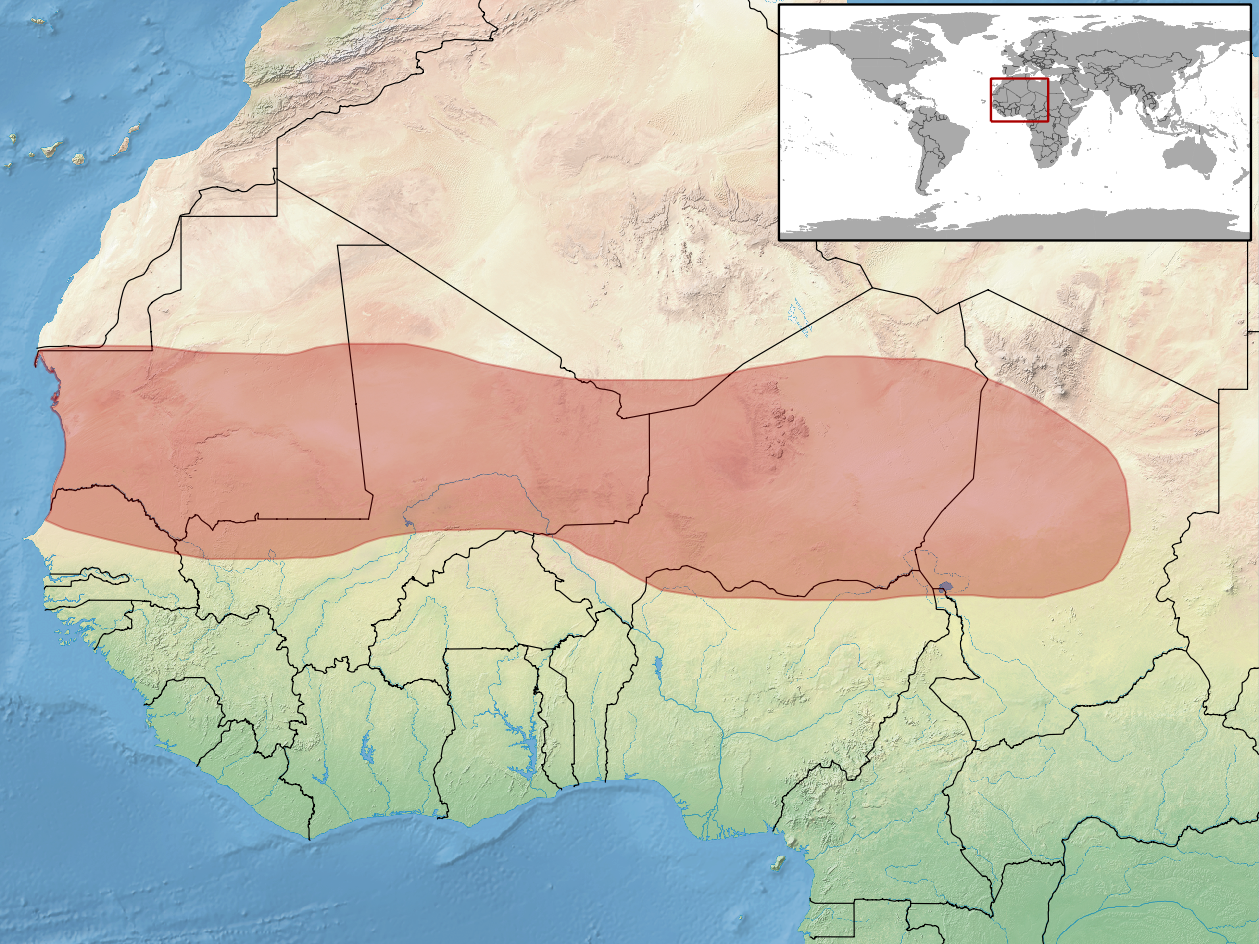

Species of lizard

Agama boueti, also known commonly as the Mali agama, is a species of lizard in the family Agamidae. The species is native to West Africa.

== Etymology ==
The specific name, boueti, is in honor of Georges Bouet (1869–1957), who was a French ornithologist and physician.

== Geographic range ==
A. boueti is found in Burkina Faso, Mali, Mauritania, Morocco, Niger, and Senegal.

== Habitat ==
The preferred natural habitats of A. boueti are savanna, shrubland, and rocky areas.

== Description ==
A small lizard, A. boueti may attain a snout-to-vent length (SVL) of 7.7 cm (3.0 in), and a total length (including a long tail) of 22.2 cm (8.7 in).

== Diet ==
A. boueti preys upon grasshoppers, ants, beetles, and other small arthropods. It also eats succulent plants.

== Reproduction ==
A. boueti is oviparous.
