= Agama persimilis =

Conservation status
- Least Concern (IUCN 3.1)

Scientific classification
- Kingdom: Animalia
- Phylum: Chordata
- Class: Reptilia
- Order: Squamata
- Suborder: Iguania
- Family: Agamidae
- Genus: Agama
- Species: A. persimilis

Binomial name
- Agama persimilis Parker, 1942

Species of lizard

Agama persimilis, the painted agama, is a small species of lizard in the family Agamidae. It is found in Somalia, Ethiopia, and Kenya.
