= Agama spinosa =

Conservation status
- Least Concern (IUCN 3.1)

Scientific classification
- Kingdom: Animalia
- Phylum: Chordata
- Class: Reptilia
- Order: Squamata
- Suborder: Iguania
- Family: Agamidae
- Genus: Agama
- Species: A. spinosa

Binomial name
- Agama spinosa JE Gray, 1831

Species of lizard

Agama spinosa, Gray's agama or spiny agama, is a species of lizard in the family Agamidae. It is a small lizard found in Egypt, Sudan, Ethiopia, Eritrea, Djibouti, and Somalia.
