= Agama doriae =

Conservation status
- Least Concern (IUCN 3.1)

Scientific classification
- Kingdom: Animalia
- Phylum: Chordata
- Class: Reptilia
- Order: Squamata
- Suborder: Iguania
- Family: Agamidae
- Genus: Agama
- Species: A. doriae

Binomial name
- Agama doriae Boulenger, 1885

Species of lizard

Agama doriae, also known commonly as the Benoue agama, Doria's agama, and the Nigeria agama, is a species of lizard in the family Agamidae. The species is endemic to Africa. There are two recognized subspecies.

== Etymology ==
The specific name, doriae, is in honor of Italian naturalist Giacomo Doria.

== Geographic range ==
A. doriae is found in Cameroon, Central African Republic, Eritrea, Ethiopia, Ghana, Nigeria, Sudan, and Togo.

== Habitat ==
The preferred natural habitat of A. doriae is rocky areas in forest, savanna, and shrubland, at altitudes of 700–2,300 m (2,300–7,500 ft), but it is also found in agricultural areas.

== Description ==
Adults of A. doriae have a snout-to-vent-length (SVL) of about 10.5 cm (4.1 in).

== Reproduction ==
A. doriae is oviparous.

== Subspecies ==
Two subspecies are recognized as being valid, including the nominotypical subspecies.

- Agama doriae benueensis Monard, 1951
- Agama doriae doriae Boulenger, 1885
