= Agama wachirai =

Scientific classification
- Kingdom: Animalia
- Phylum: Chordata
- Class: Reptilia
- Order: Squamata
- Suborder: Iguania
- Family: Agamidae
- Genus: Agama
- Species: A. wachirai

Binomial name
- Agama wachirai Malonza, Spawls, Finch & Bauer, 2021

Species of lizard

Agama wachirai, the Marsabit rock agama, is a species of lizard in the family Agamidae. It is a small lizard endemic to Kenya.
