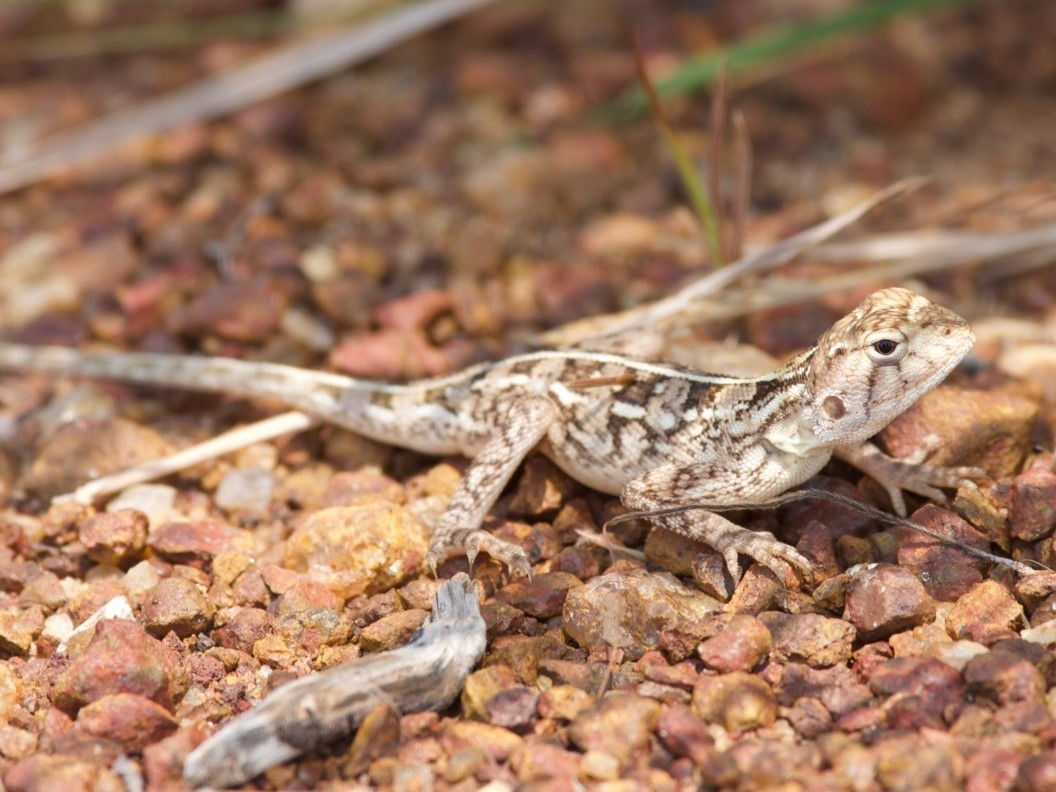

Scientific classification
- Kingdom: Animalia
- Phylum: Chordata
- Class: Reptilia
- Order: Squamata
- Suborder: Iguania
- Family: Agamidae
- Genus: Agama
- Species: A. sankaranica

Binomial name
- Agama sankaranica Chabanaud, 1918

= Agama sankaranica =

Species of lizard

Agama sankaranica, also known as the Senegal agama, is a species of agamid lizard. It has a wide geographical distribution across West Africa, possibly reaching Cameroon in Central Africa. It is called mbuwo in the Mwaghavul language of Nigeria.
