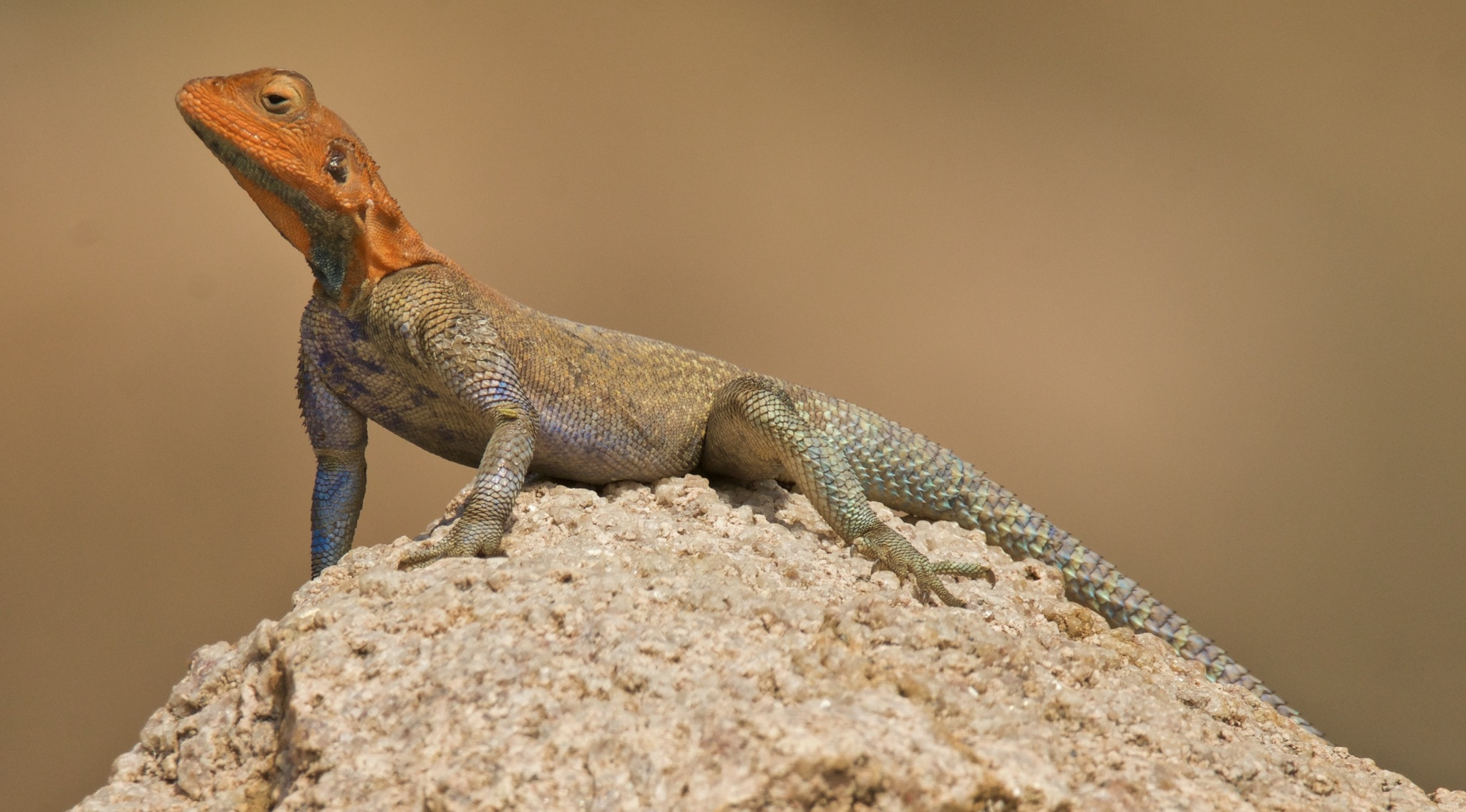

Conservation status
- Least Concern (IUCN 3.1)

Scientific classification
- Kingdom: Animalia
- Phylum: Chordata
- Class: Reptilia
- Order: Squamata
- Suborder: Iguania
- Family: Agamidae
- Genus: Agama
- Species: A. dodomae

Binomial name
- Agama dodomae Loveridge, 1923

Synonyms
- Agama lionotus dodomae Loveridge, 1923

= Agama dodomae =

Species of lizard

Agama dodomae is a species of lizard in the family Agamidae. It is a small lizard found in Tanzania.
