= Agama somalica =

Conservation status
- Least Concern (IUCN 3.1)

Scientific classification
- Kingdom: Animalia
- Phylum: Chordata
- Class: Reptilia
- Order: Squamata
- Suborder: Iguania
- Family: Agamidae
- Genus: Agama
- Species: A. somalica

Binomial name
- Agama somalica Wagner, Leaché, Mazuch, & Böhme, 2013

Species of lizard

Agama somalica is a species of lizard in the family Agamidae. It is a small lizard found in Somalia.
