= Agama paragama =

Scientific classification
- Kingdom: Animalia
- Phylum: Chordata
- Class: Reptilia
- Order: Squamata
- Suborder: Iguania
- Family: Agamidae
- Genus: Agama
- Species: A. paragama

Binomial name
- Agama paragama Grandison, 1968

Species of lizard

Agama paragama, the false agama, is a species of lizard in the family Agamidae. It is a small lizard found in Nigeria, Cameroon, Mali, Central African Republic, Ghana, Burkina Faso, Benin, and Niger.
