= Agama caudospinosa =

Elmenteita agama

Conservation status
- Least Concern (IUCN 3.1)

Scientific classification
- Kingdom: Animalia
- Phylum: Chordata
- Class: Reptilia
- Order: Squamata
- Suborder: Iguania
- Family: Agamidae
- Genus: Agama
- Species: A. caudospinosa

Binomial name
- Agama caudospinosa Meek, 1910

Synonyms
- Agama agama caudospina Agama agama kaimosae Agama planiceps caudospinosa

Species of reptile

The Elmenteita agama or Elmenteita rock agama (Agama caudospinosa) is a species of lizard from the family Agamidae. The species is endemic to Kenya with the type locality being Lake Elmenteita, hence the common name.

== Description ==
The males are predominantly grey, reaching lengths of 45 cm (18 in). They are spiny with relatively wide tails. When "in display", the males show various shades of orange or red around their necks, chins, and chests. Females are smaller and mottled brown with a vertical line of pale spots.
