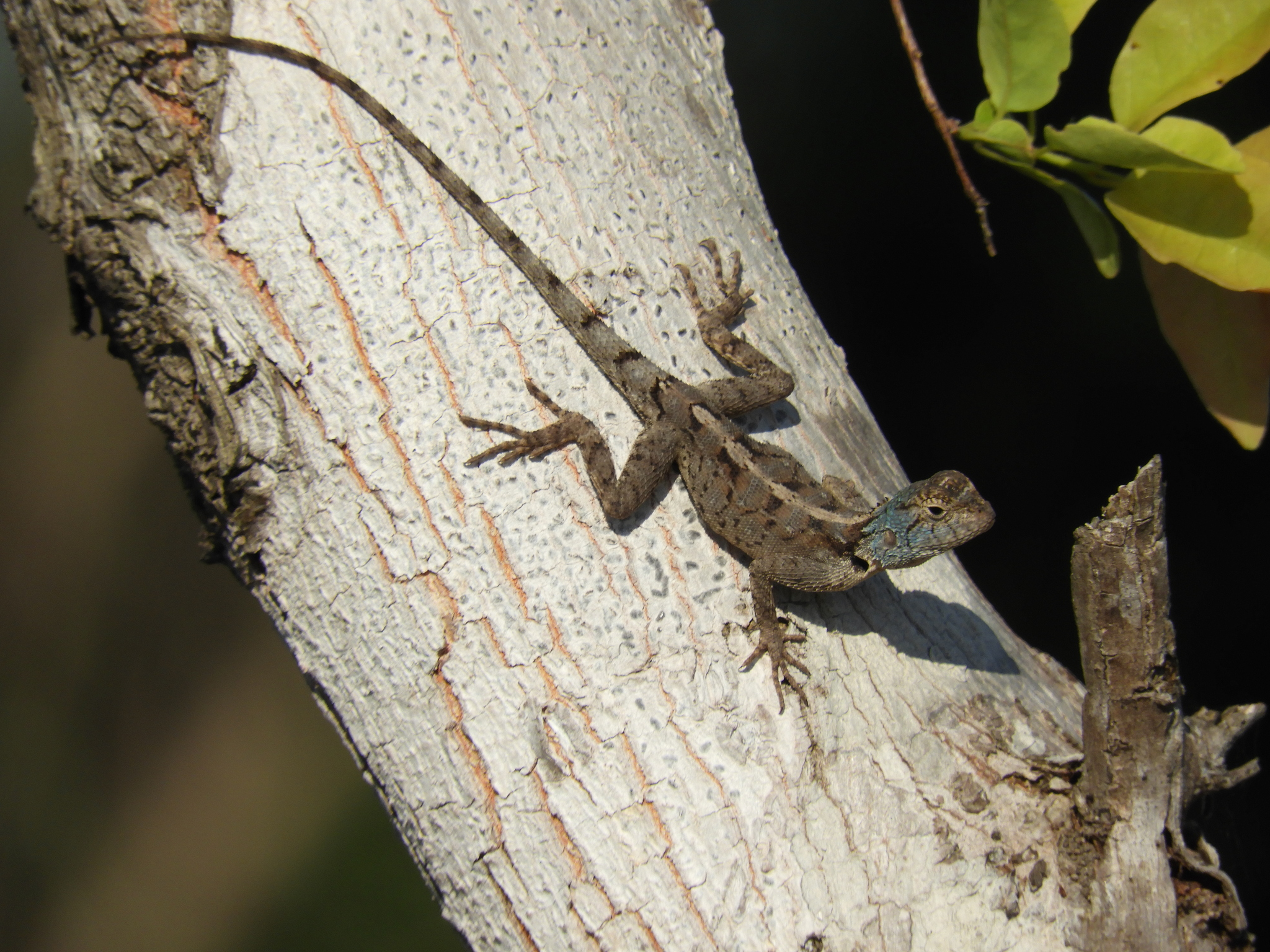
- The Mozambique agama rests on a tree branch.

Scientific classification
- Kingdom: Animalia
- Phylum: Chordata
- Class: Reptilia
- Order: Squamata
- Suborder: Iguania
- Family: Agamidae
- Genus: Agama
- Species: A. mossambica

Binomial name
- Agama mossambica Peters, 1854

= Agama mossambica =

Species of lizard

Agama mossambica, the Mozambique agama, is a species of lizard in the family Agamidae. It is a small lizard found in Tanzania, Malawi, Zambia, Mozambique, and Zimbabwe.
