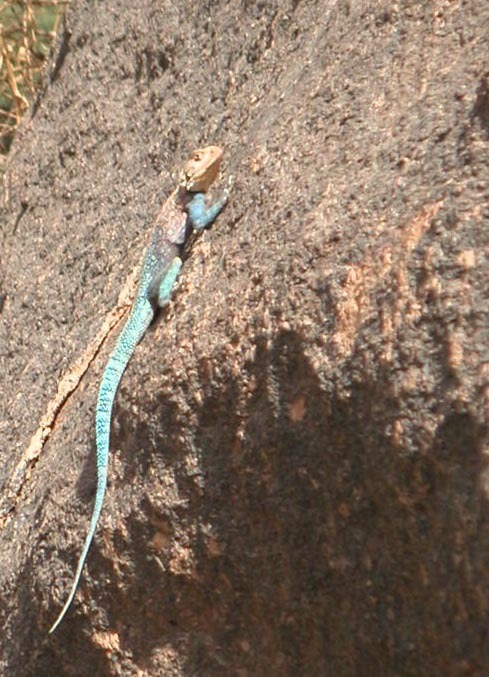

Conservation status
- Least Concern (IUCN 3.1)

Scientific classification
- Kingdom: Animalia
- Phylum: Chordata
- Class: Reptilia
- Order: Squamata
- Suborder: Iguania
- Family: Agamidae
- Genus: Agama
- Species: A. tassiliensis

Binomial name
- Agama tassiliensis Geniez, Padial, & Crochet, 2011

= Agama tassiliensis =

Species of lizard

Agama tassiliensis is a species of lizard in the family Agamidae. It is a small lizard found in Mali, Niger, Algeria, and Libya.
