= Agama gracilimembris =

Scientific classification
- Kingdom: Animalia
- Phylum: Chordata
- Class: Reptilia
- Order: Squamata
- Suborder: Iguania
- Family: Agamidae
- Genus: Agama
- Species: A. gracilimembris

Binomial name
- Agama gracilimembris Chabanaud, 1918

Species of lizard

Agama gracilimembris or the Benin agama is a species of lizard native to Africa. It is found in the Afrotropical realm in the savanna as well as forests.

== Description ==
Agama gracilimembris is considered a dwarf agama; females are longer than males. Both females and males vary in color, however during the breeding season, the colors will become more dichromic. During this period, males will develop a dorsal pattern. The species is usually brown or black.

== Distribution ==
Agama gracilimembris has a large distribution. It has been either confirmed or sighted in Chad, Central African Republic, Nigeria, Ethiopia, Uganda, Sudan, Democratic Republic of the Congo, Guinea, Ivory Coast, Cameroon, Senegal, Ghana, Togo, Benin, Mali, Niger, and Burkina Faso.
