= Agama bocourti =

Conservation status
- Data Deficient (IUCN 3.1)

Scientific classification
- Kingdom: Animalia
- Phylum: Chordata
- Class: Reptilia
- Order: Squamata
- Suborder: Iguania
- Family: Agamidae
- Genus: Agama
- Species: A. bocourti

Binomial name
- Agama bocourti Rochebrune, 1884
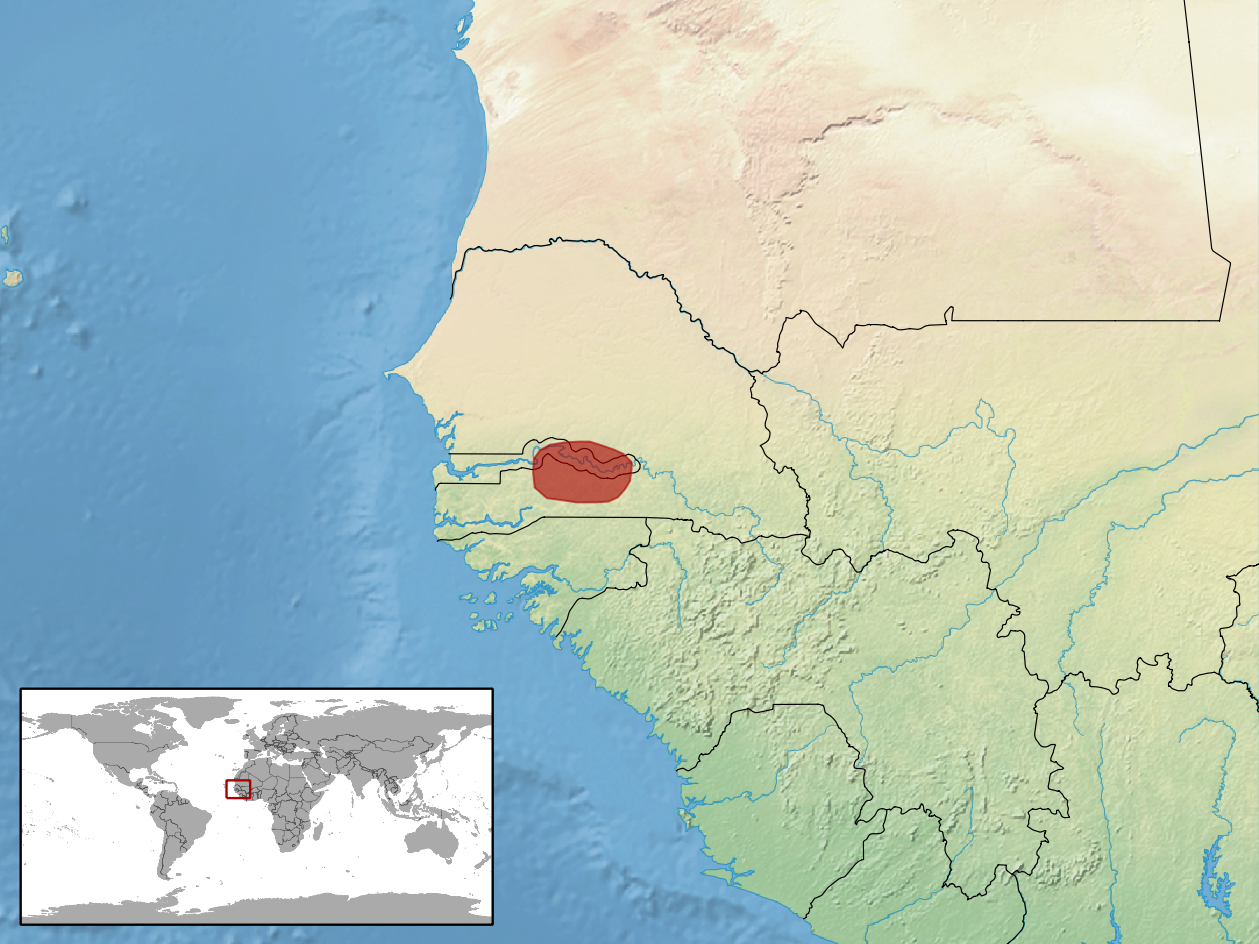

Species of lizard

Agama bocourti, also known commonly as Bocourt's agama, is a small species of lizard in the family Agamidae. The species is native to West Africa.

== Etymology ==
The specific name, bocourti, is in honor of French zoologist Marie Firmin Bocourt.

== Geographic range ==
Agama bocourti is found in Gambia and Senegal.

== Habitat ==
The preferred natural habitat of Agama bocourti is unknown.

== Reproduction ==
Agama bocourti is oviparous.
