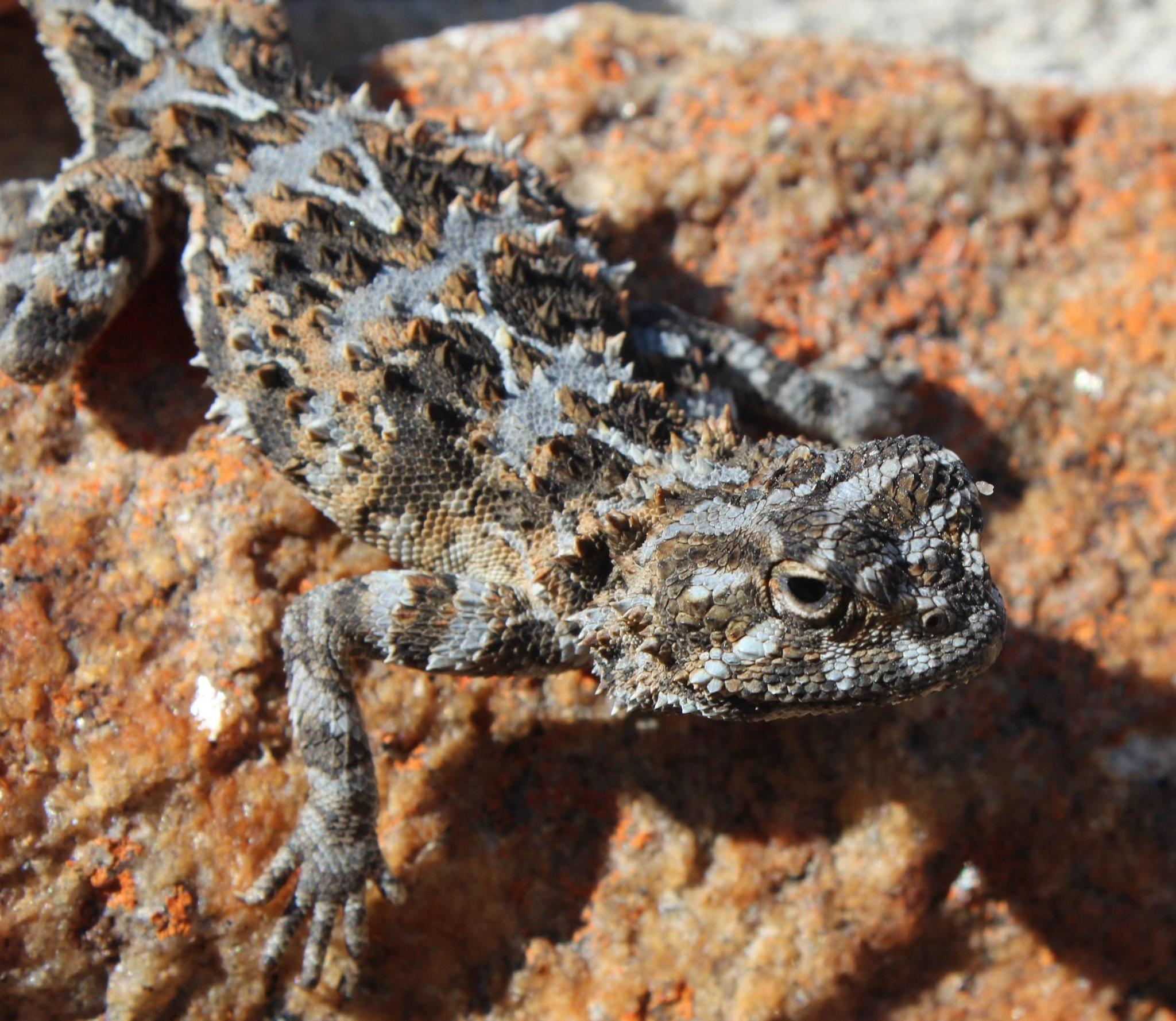

Conservation status
- Least Concern (IUCN 3.1)

Scientific classification
- Kingdom: Animalia
- Phylum: Chordata
- Class: Reptilia
- Order: Squamata
- Suborder: Iguania
- Family: Agamidae
- Genus: Agama
- Species: A. hispida

Binomial name
- Agama hispida (Linnaeus, 1758)

Synonyms
- Lacerta hispida Linnaeus, 1758; Trapelus hispidus Kaup, 1827; Agama hispida — Boulenger, 1885

= Agama hispida =

Species of lizard

Agama hispida, also known commonly as the common spiny agama, the southern spiny agama, and the spiny ground agama, is a species of lizard in the family Agamidae. The species is native to southern Africa. There are two recognized subspecies.

== Geographic range ==
A. hispida is found in Botswana, Namibia, and South Africa.

== Habitat ==
The preferred natural habitat of A. hispida is shrubland.

== Description ==
A. hispida is a small lizard.

== Reproduction ==
A. hispida is oviparous.

== Subspecies ==
Two subspecies are recognized as being valid, including the nominotypical subspecies.

- Agama hispida hispida (Linnaeus, 1758)
- Agama hispida makarikarika V. FitzSimons, 1932

Nota bene: A trinomial authority in parentheses indicates that the subspecies was originally described in a genus other than Agama.

== Gallery ==
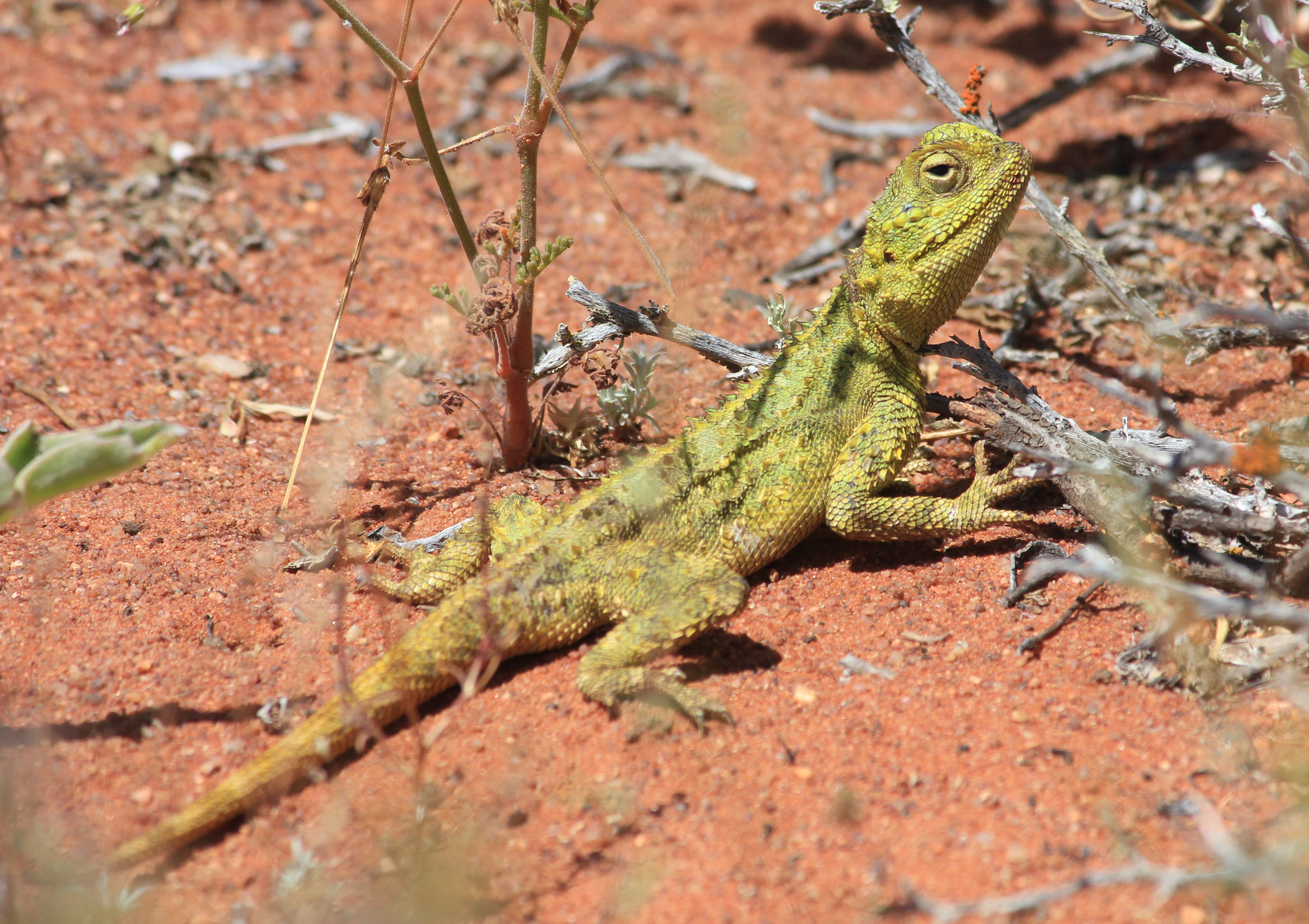

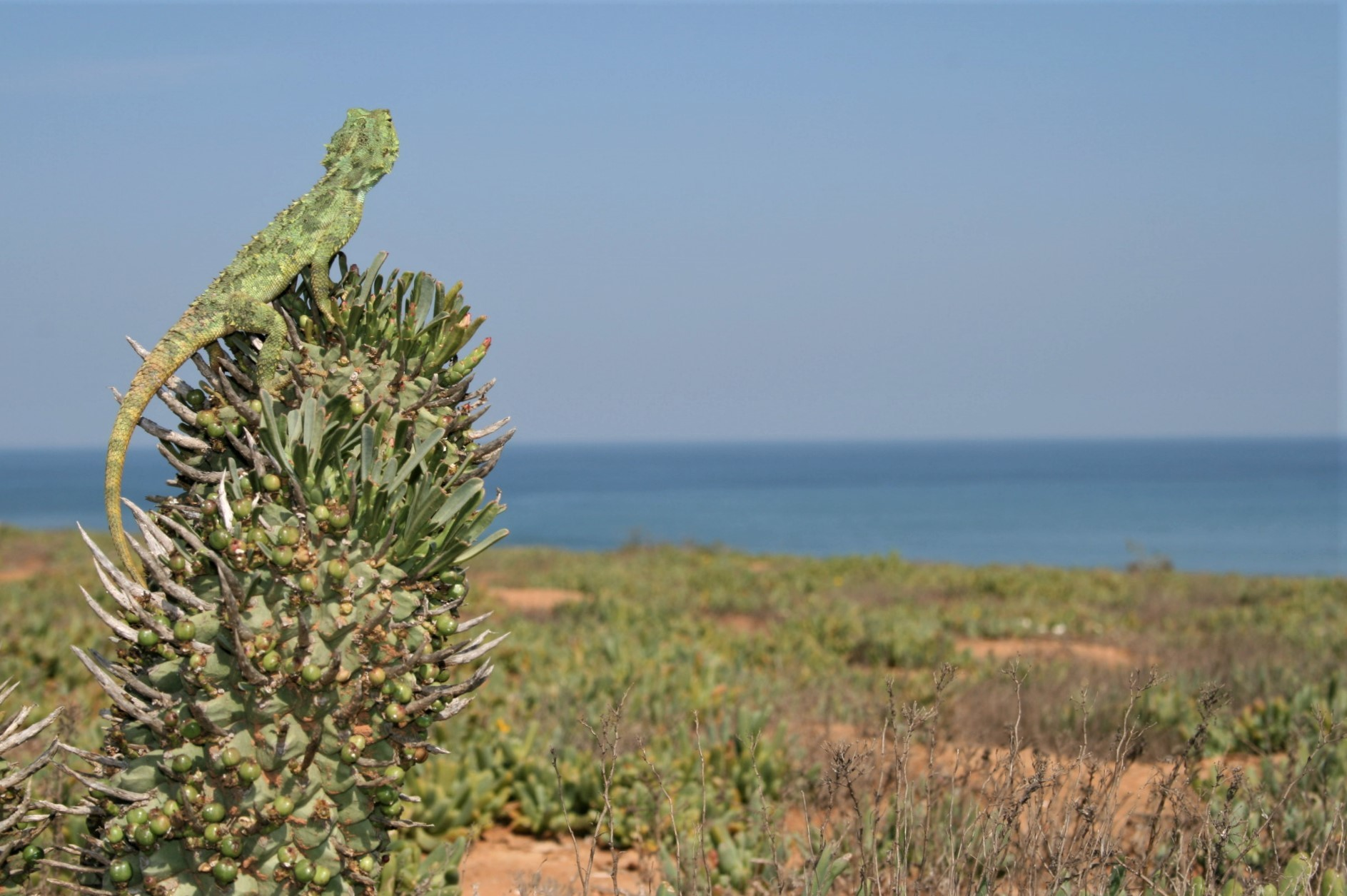

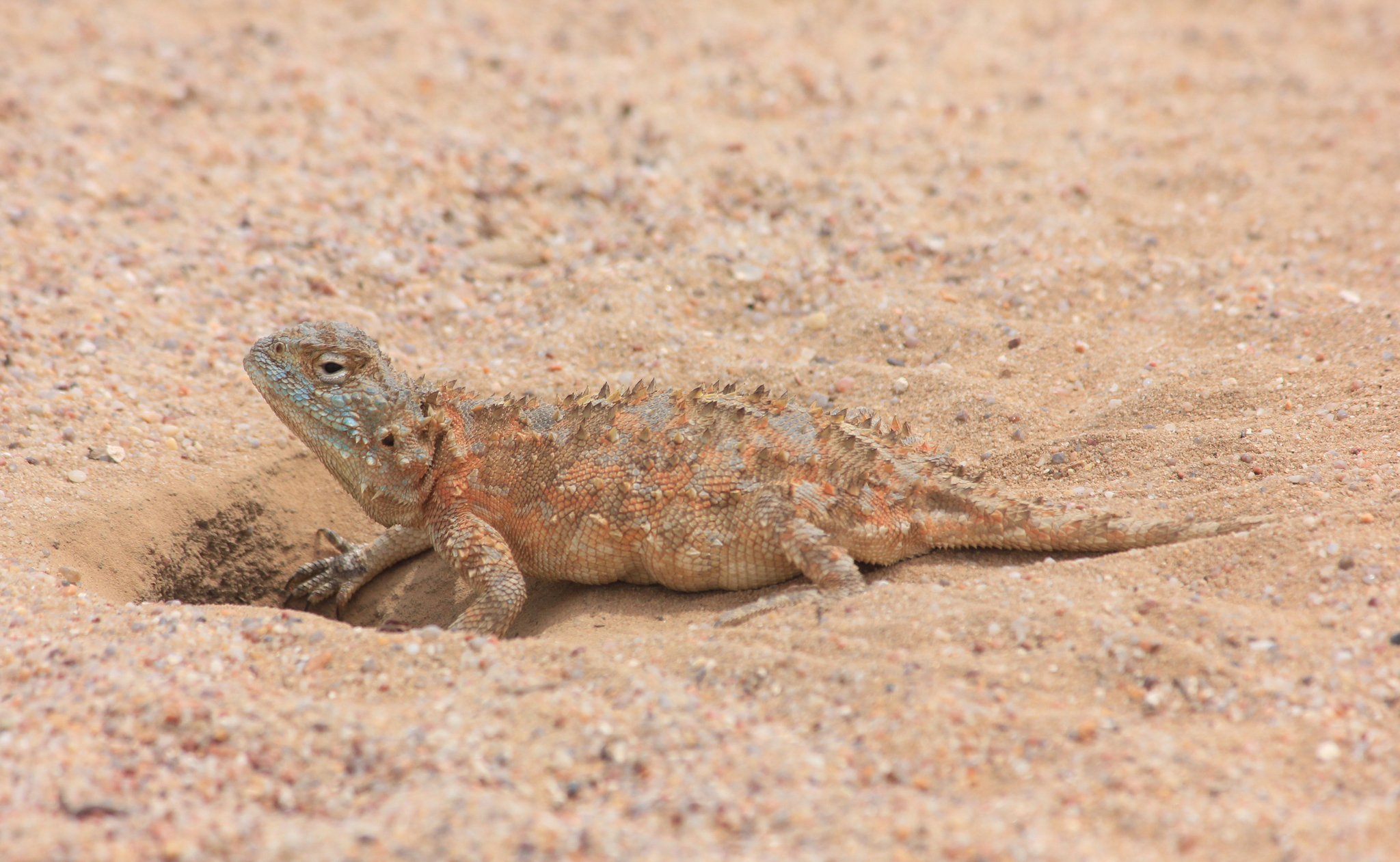

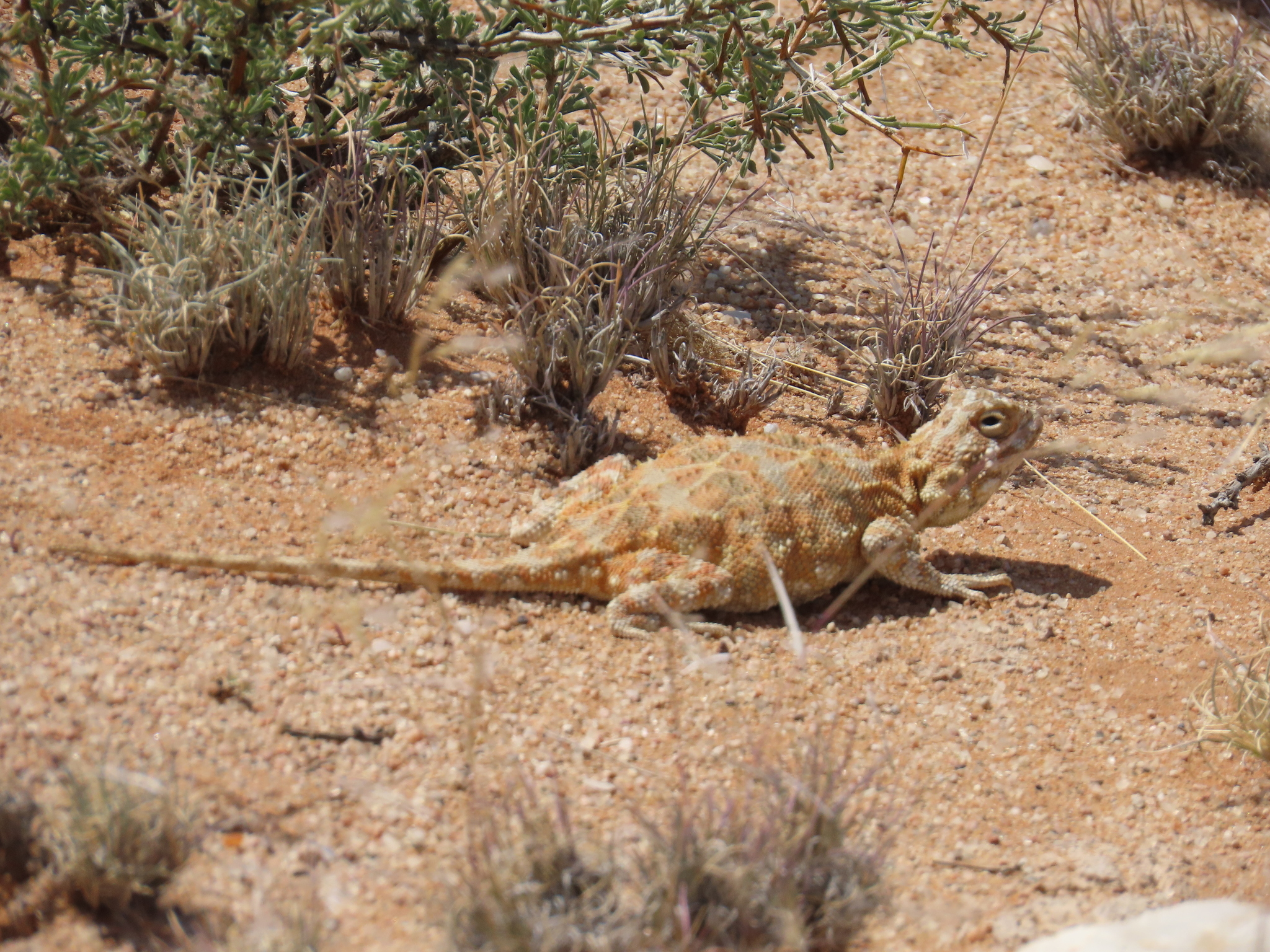

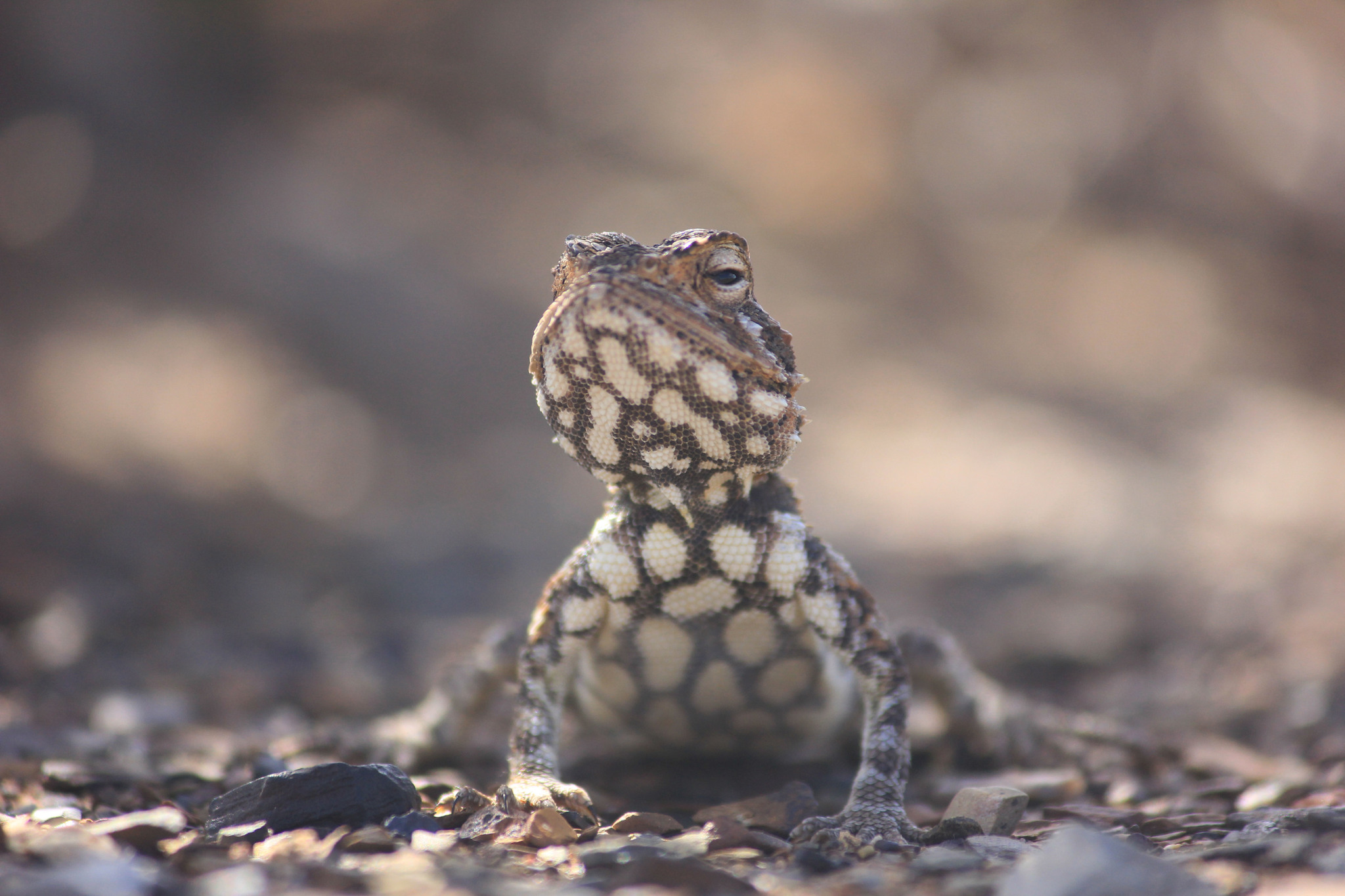

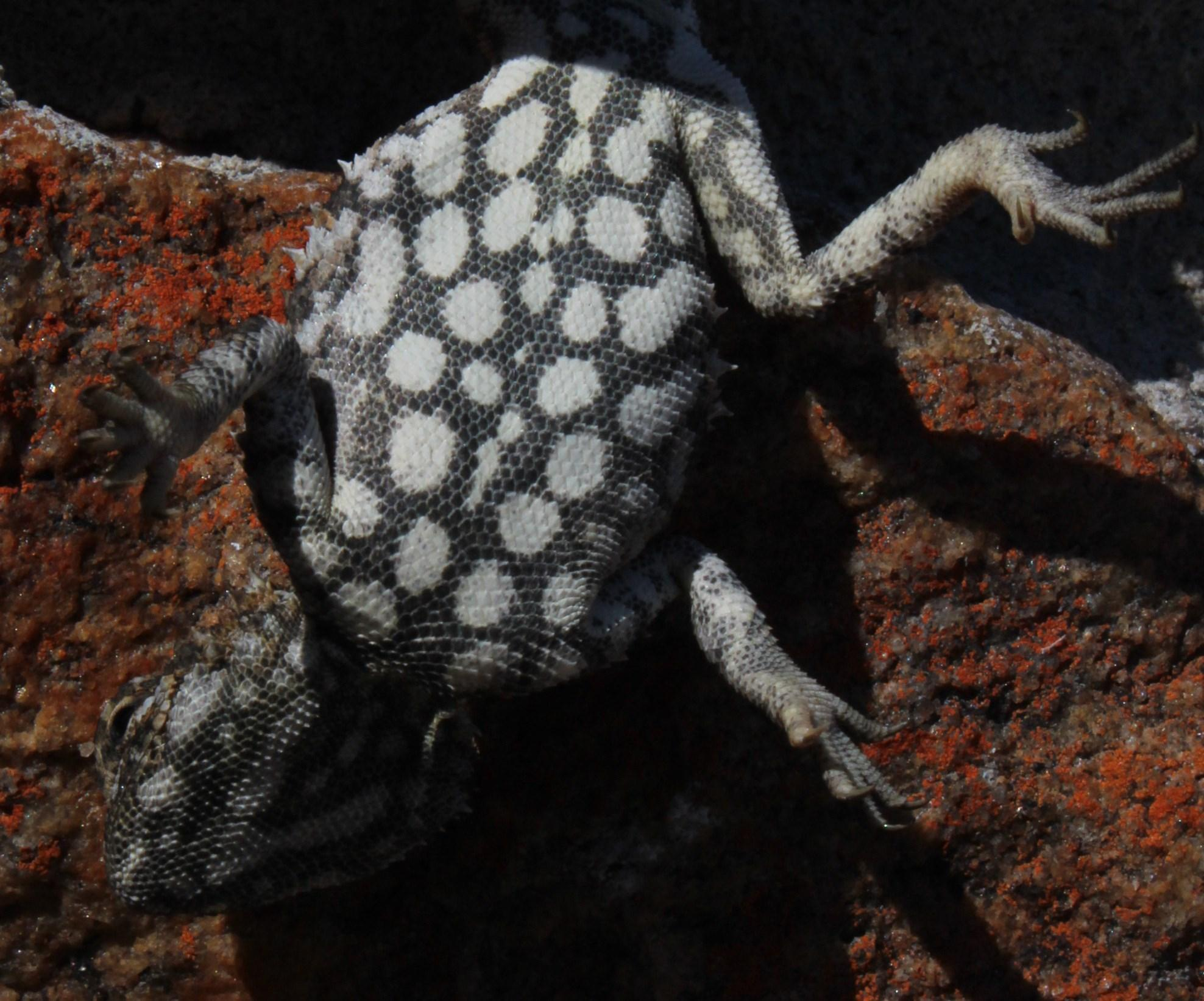
Underside
