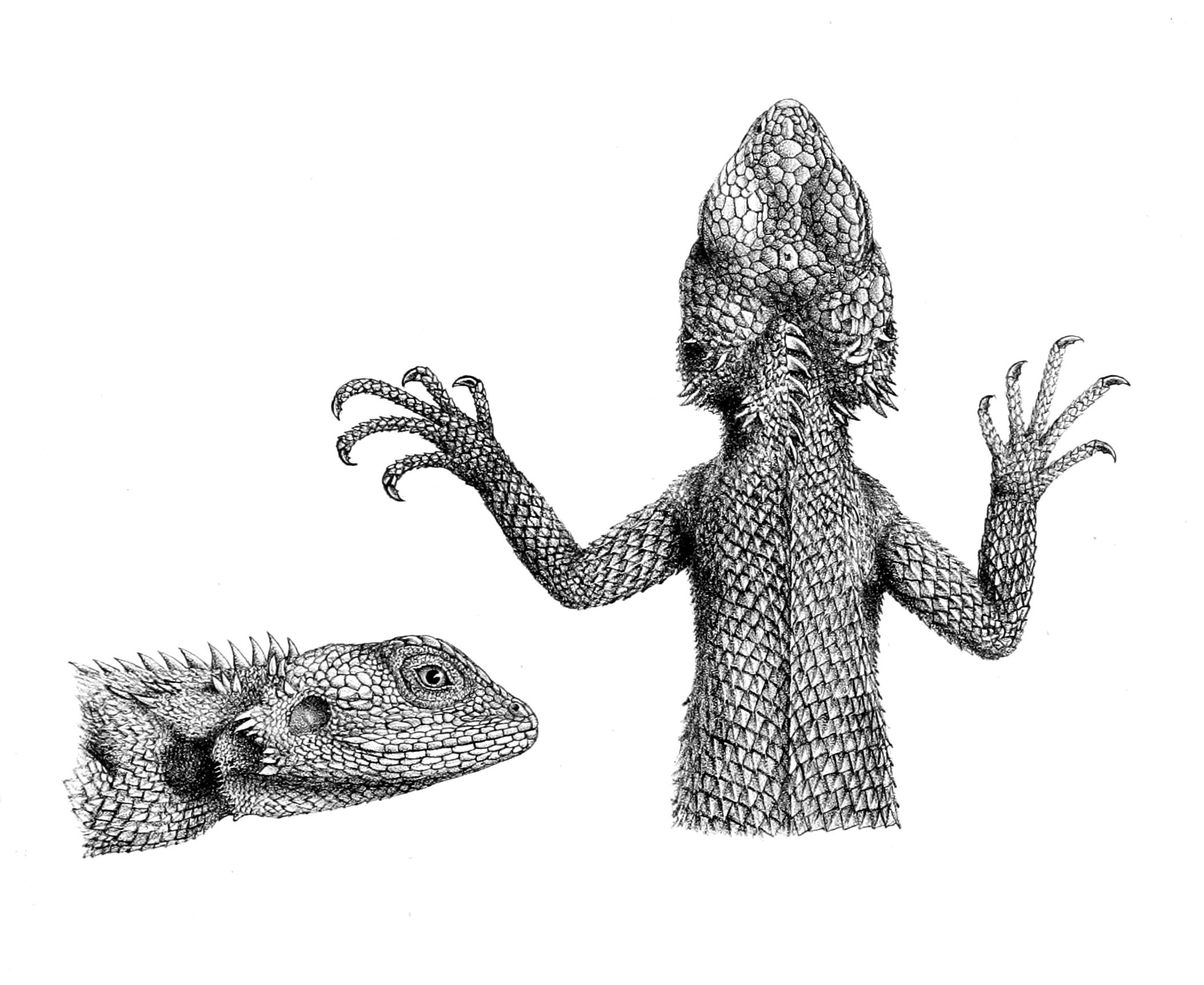

Conservation status
- Data Deficient (IUCN 3.1)

Scientific classification
- Kingdom: Animalia
- Phylum: Chordata
- Class: Reptilia
- Order: Squamata
- Suborder: Iguania
- Family: Agamidae
- Genus: Agama
- Species: A. bottegi

Binomial name
- Agama bottegi Boulenger, 1897

= Agama bottegi =

Species of lizard

Agama bottegi, also known commonly as the Somali agama, is a species of lizard in the family Agamidae. The species is endemic to Somalia.

== Etymology ==
The specific name, bottegi, is in honor of Italian explorer Vittorio Bottego.

== Habitat ==
The preferred natural habitat of A. bottegi is shrubland.

== Description ==
Large for its genus, A. bottegi, may attain a snout-to-vent length (SVL) of 12 cm (4.7 in) and total length (including tail) of 35.5 cm (14.0 in).

== Reproduction ==
A. bottegi is oviparous.
