= Agama knobeli =

Conservation status
- Least Concern (IUCN 3.1)

Scientific classification
- Kingdom: Animalia
- Phylum: Chordata
- Class: Reptilia
- Order: Squamata
- Suborder: Iguania
- Family: Agamidae
- Genus: Agama
- Species: A. knobeli

Binomial name
- Agama knobeli Boulenger & Power, 1921

Species of lizard

Agama knobeli, the southern rock agama, is a species of lizard in the family Agamidae. It is a small lizard found in Namibia.
