= Agama insularis =

Conservation status
- Least Concern (IUCN 3.1)

Scientific classification
- Kingdom: Animalia
- Phylum: Chordata
- Class: Reptilia
- Order: Squamata
- Suborder: Iguania
- Family: Agamidae
- Genus: Agama
- Species: A. insularis

Binomial name
- Agama insularis Chabanaud, 1918

Species of lizard

Agama insularis, the insular agama, is a species of lizard in the family Agamidae. It is a small lizard found on Rooma Island (now known as Roume Island) in Guinea.
