= Agama cristata =

Conservation status
- Least Concern (IUCN 3.1)

Scientific classification
- Kingdom: Animalia
- Phylum: Chordata
- Class: Reptilia
- Order: Squamata
- Suborder: Iguania
- Family: Agamidae
- Genus: Agama
- Species: A. cristata

Binomial name
- Agama cristata Mocquard, 1905

Species of lizard

Agama cristata, the insular agama, is a species of lizard in the family Agamidae. It is a small lizard found in Mali and Guinea.
