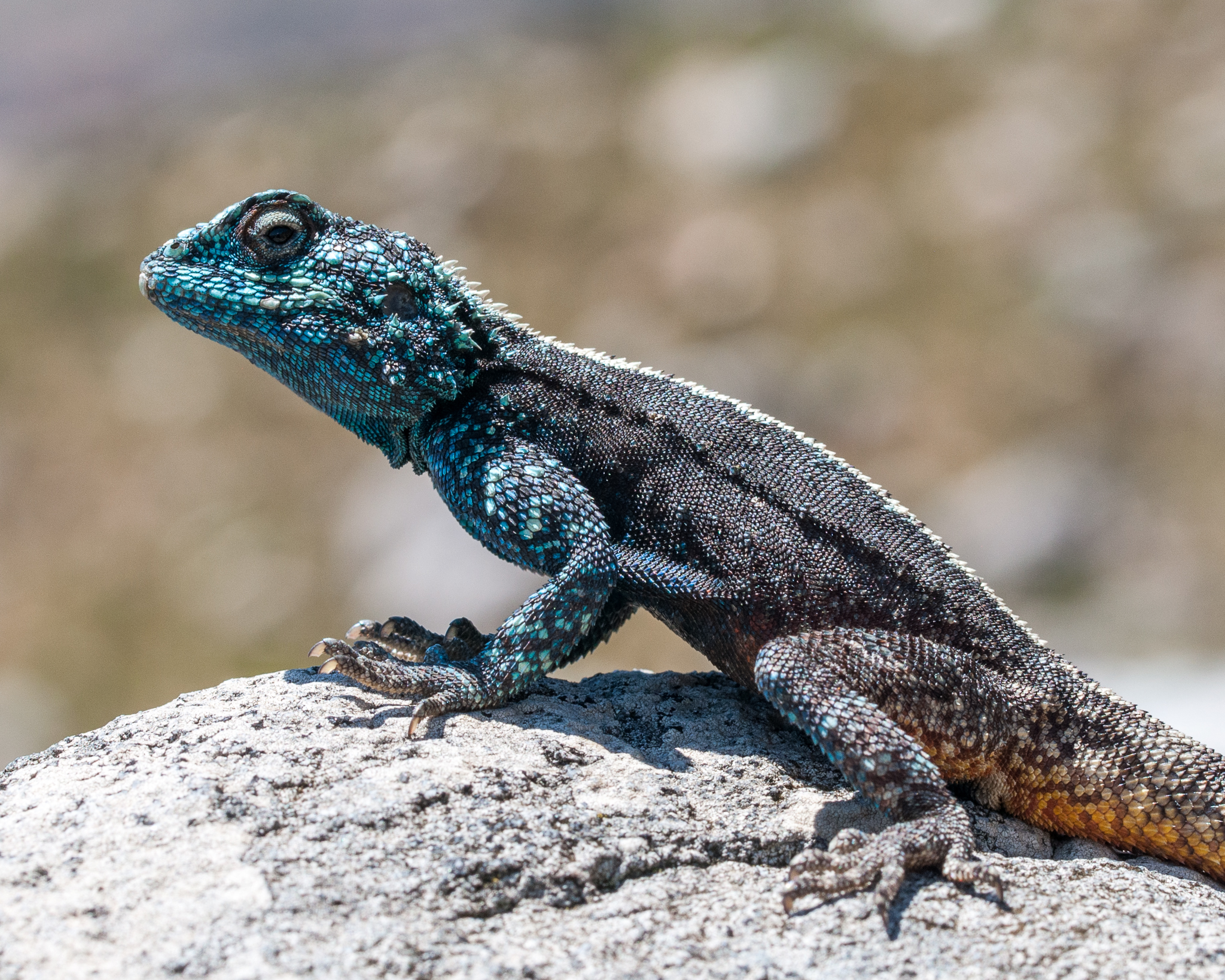
- Male (breeding season)
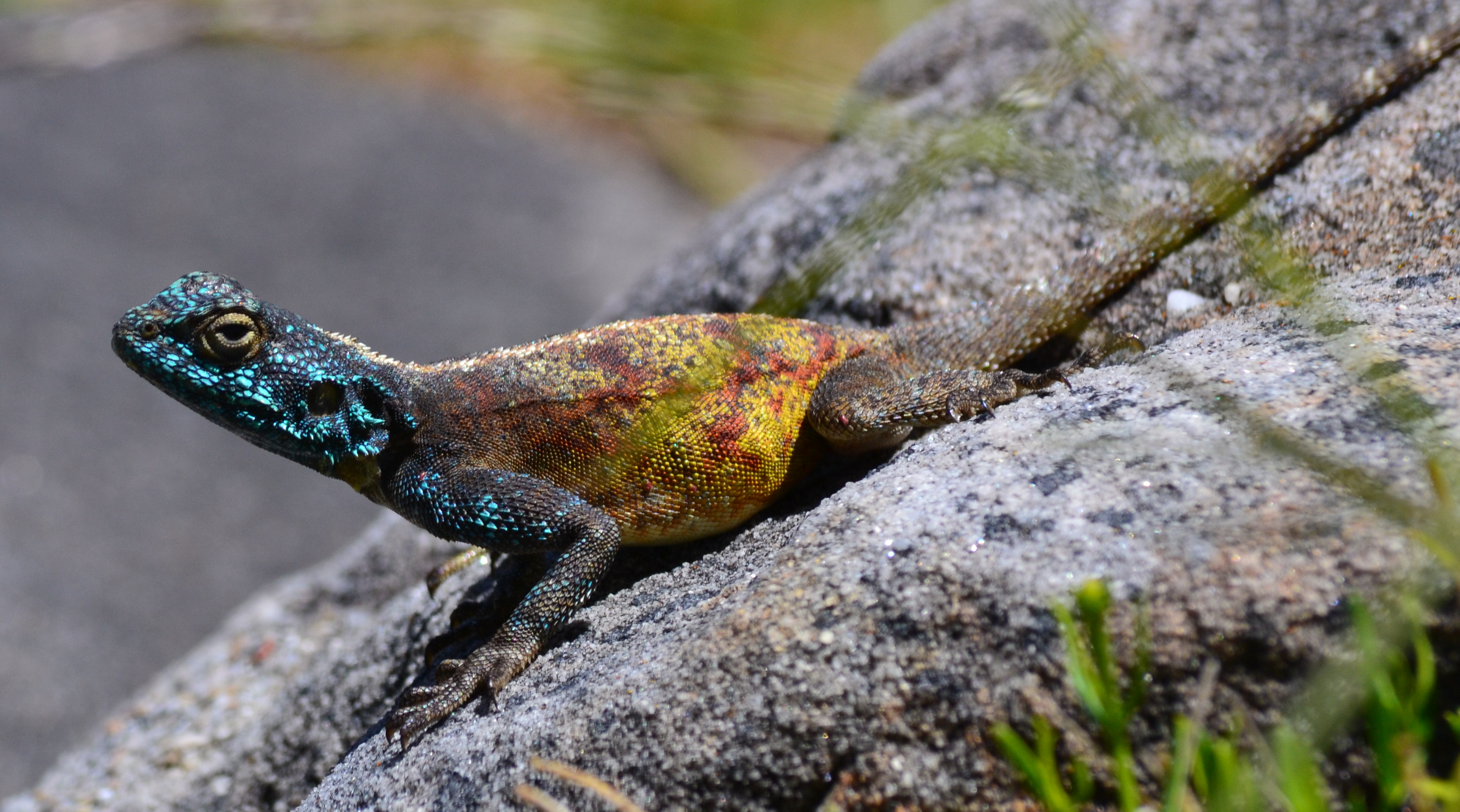
- Female (breeding season)

Conservation status
- Least Concern (IUCN 3.1)

Scientific classification
- Kingdom: Animalia
- Phylum: Chordata
- Class: Reptilia
- Order: Squamata
- Suborder: Iguania
- Family: Agamidae
- Genus: Agama
- Species: A. atra

Binomial name
- Agama atra Peters, 1855

= Agama atra =

Species of lizard

The southern rock agama or southern African rock agama (Agama atra) is a species of lizard from the family Agamidae that occurs in Southern Africa in Zambia, South Africa, Eswatini, Mozambique, Zimbabwe and Botswana. It lives in small colonies on rocky outcrops, and the males are very conspicuous for their bright blue heads.

== Distribution ==
The natural range of this species is over the entire South Africa and Botswana, excluding only sandy areas of the Northern Cape and portions of the Limpopo, Mpumalanga, and KwaZulu-Natal provinces.

== Description ==
This rather sociable agama is normally found in small groups or colonies. It grows up to about 25 cm and has a thin dorsal crest that runs the length of its body. It typically has a short, plump body and a thin tail, with a triangular head. During the breeding season, the heads of the males become bright blue. The males also take to sitting on top of prominent rocks and are therefore a common sight in mountainous areas of South Africa. The females and young are a more uniform greyish-brown and are much more shy.

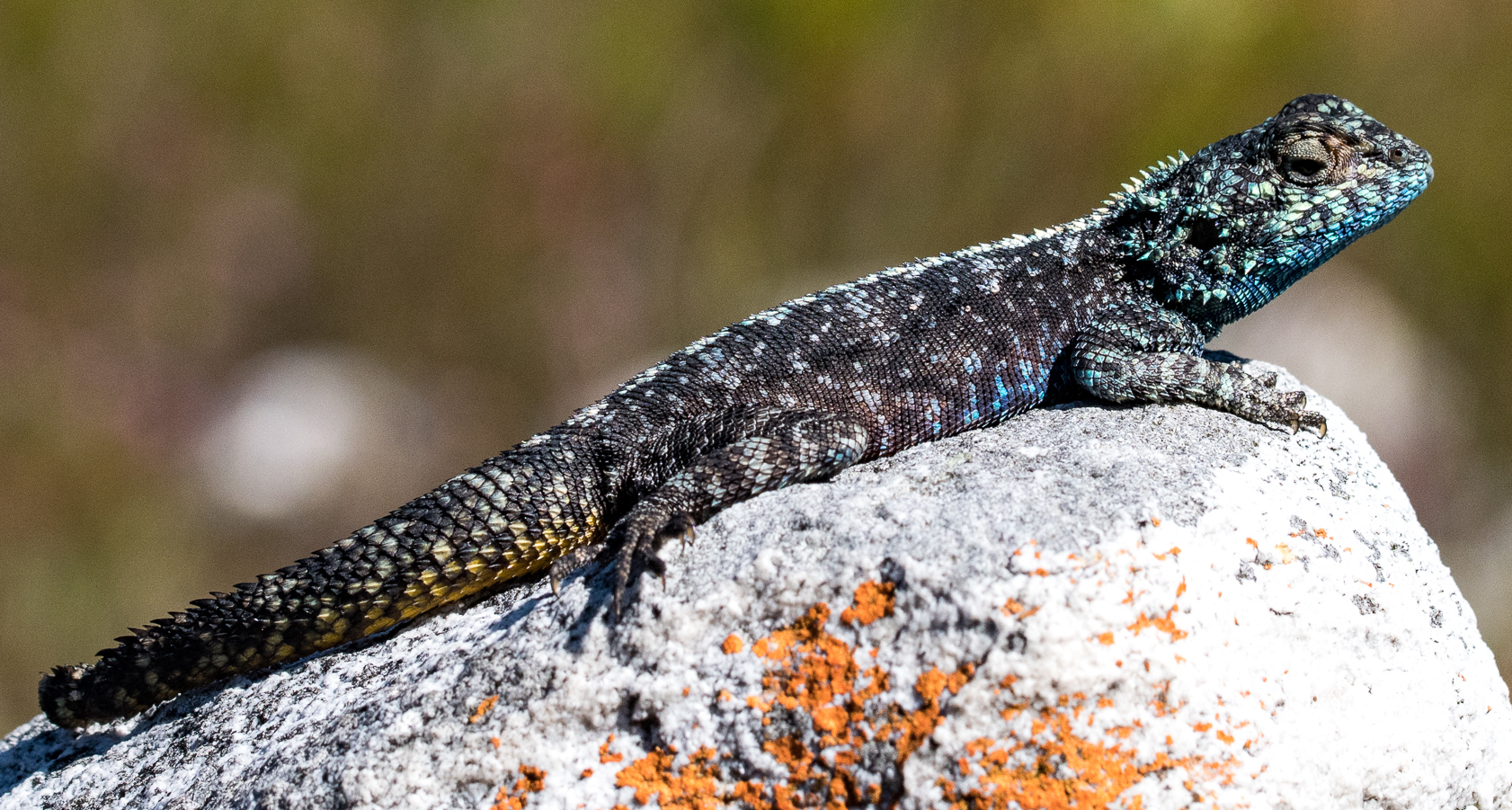
Male

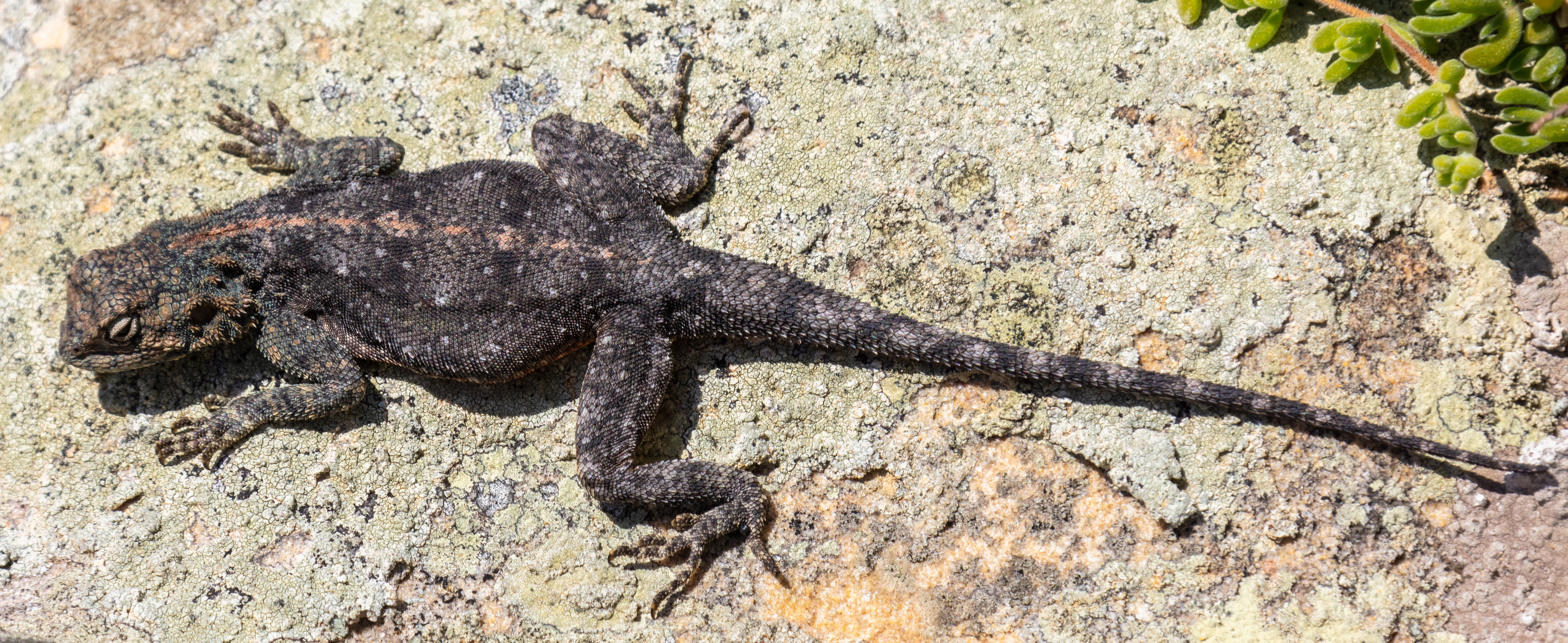
Nonbreeding female

These active, diurnal lizards normally hunt small insects such as ants and termites. They sometimes adjust to living near urban areas and can even live in rocky gardens. However, the increasingly dense populations of domestic cats being kept as pets in suburban areas have unfortunately led to a decline in population, as these introduced predators tend to kill all the agamas in the immediate area. Agama atra's natural predators in the wild include the fiscal shrike and various snakes. Agama atra is also easy prey for eagles and larger reptiles. Under attack the Agamas go into hiding and will only return once the danger is over. Some Agamas are kept as household pets and generally have a good relationship with their pet owners.

A. atra has some ability to change colour, although not to the same extent as chameleons, of which the Agamidae are a sister group. When a male agama in breeding colouration is approached by a potential predator, it will lie flat against a rock and lose the intense breeding colours in favour of more cryptic colouration. A dominant male usually occupies a high point in the area and performs a pushup display and head nodding to warn off intruders.

== Gallery ==
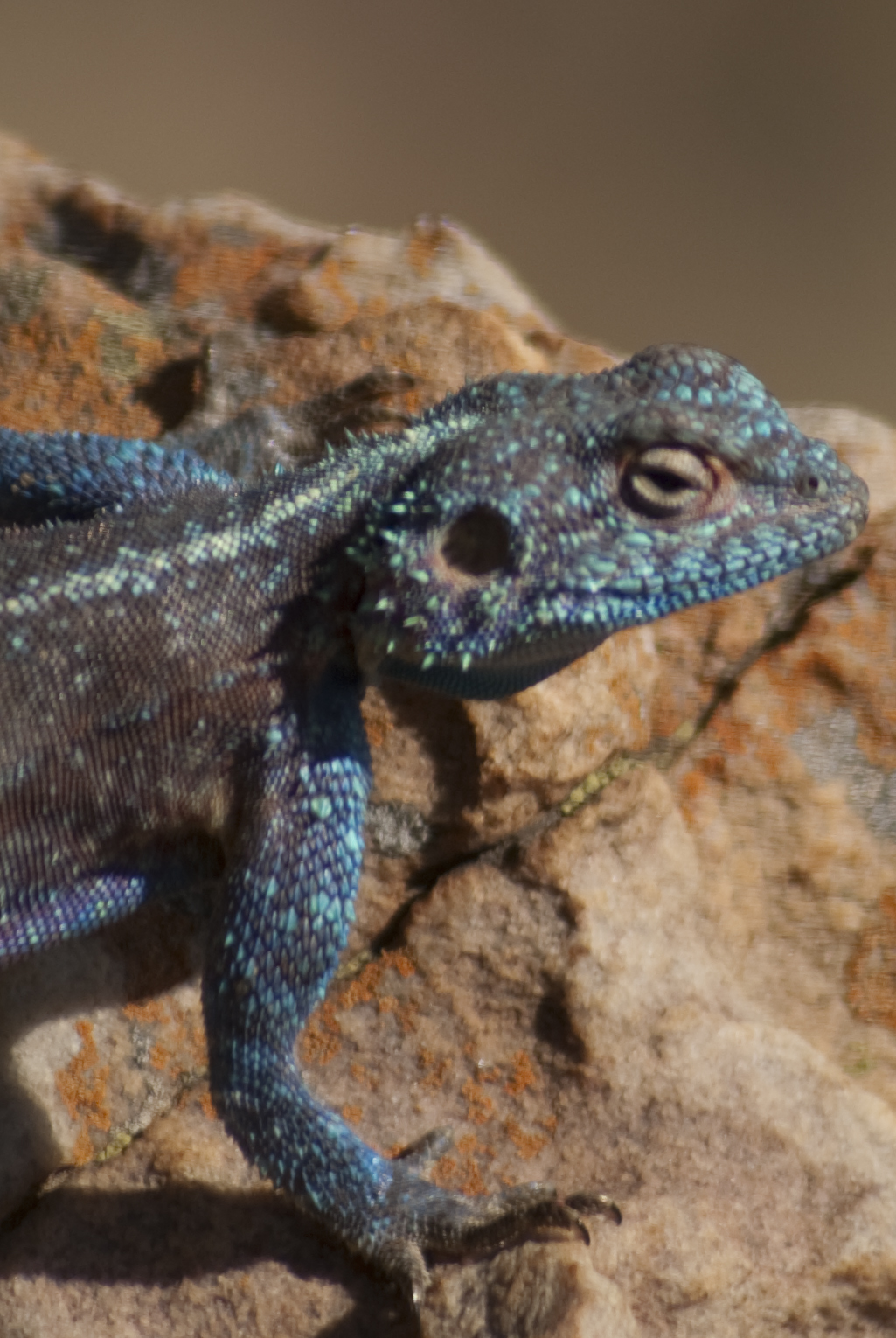
Male Agama atra

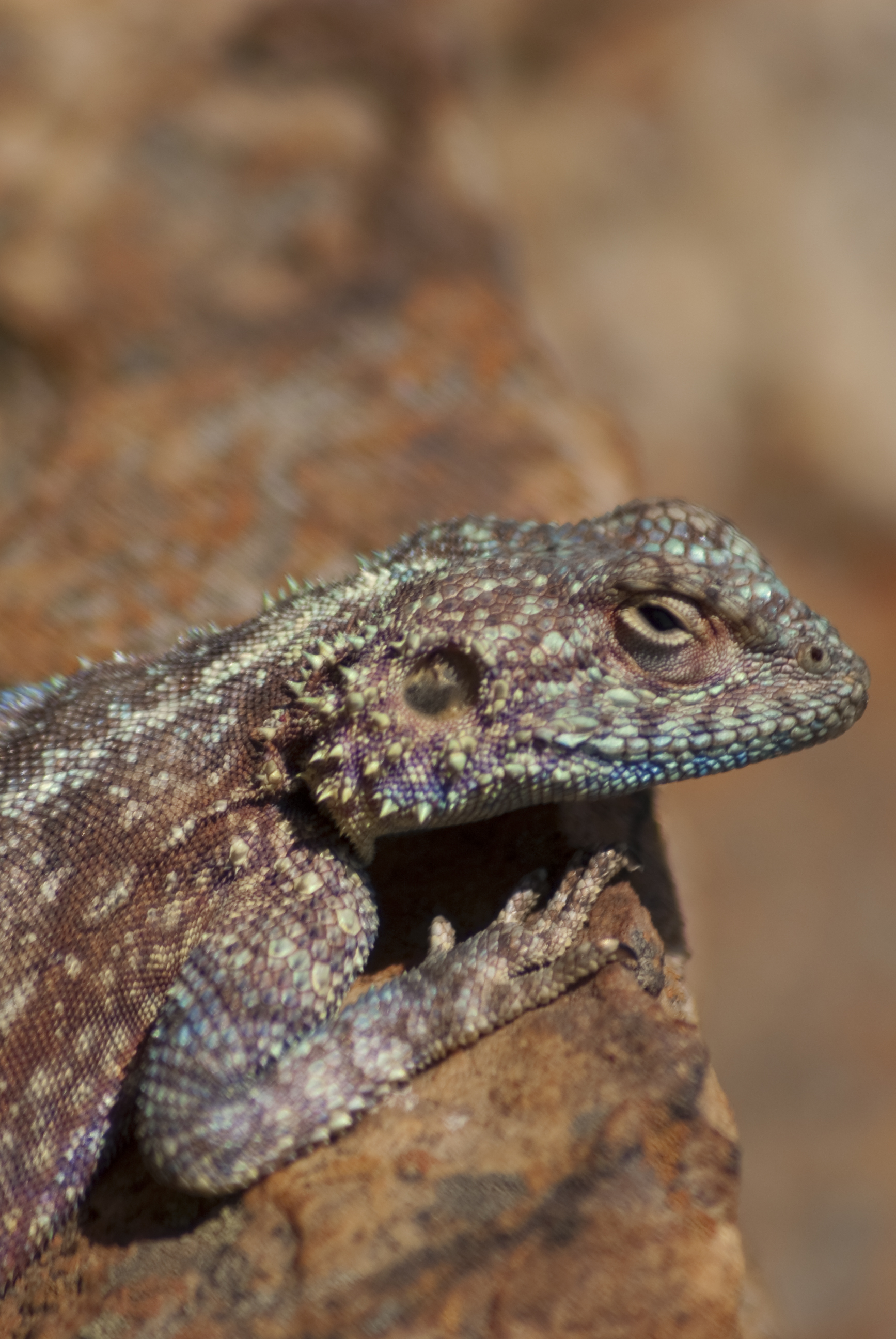
Same individual as the left a few minutes later with diminished breeding colouration

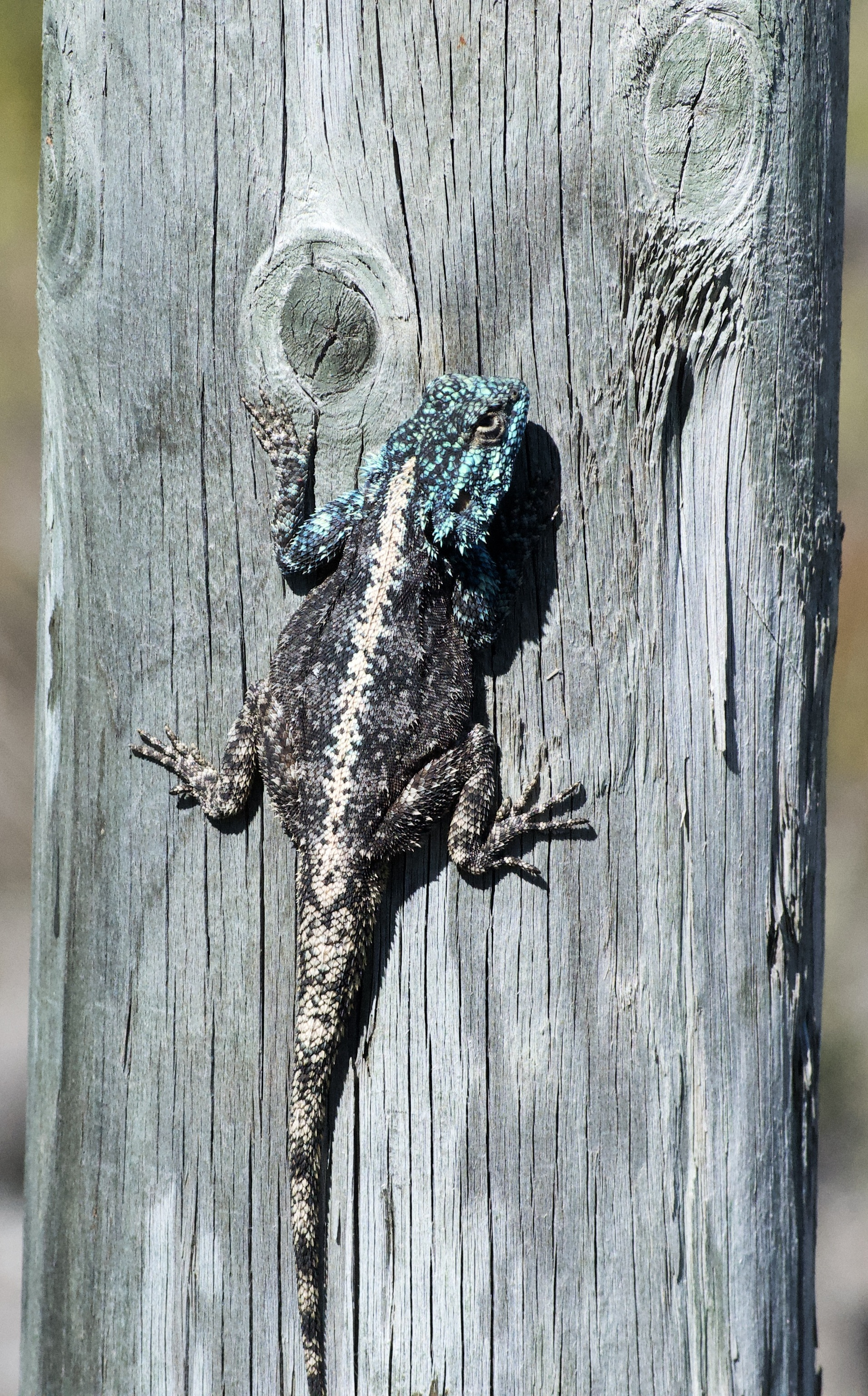
Male in breeding season

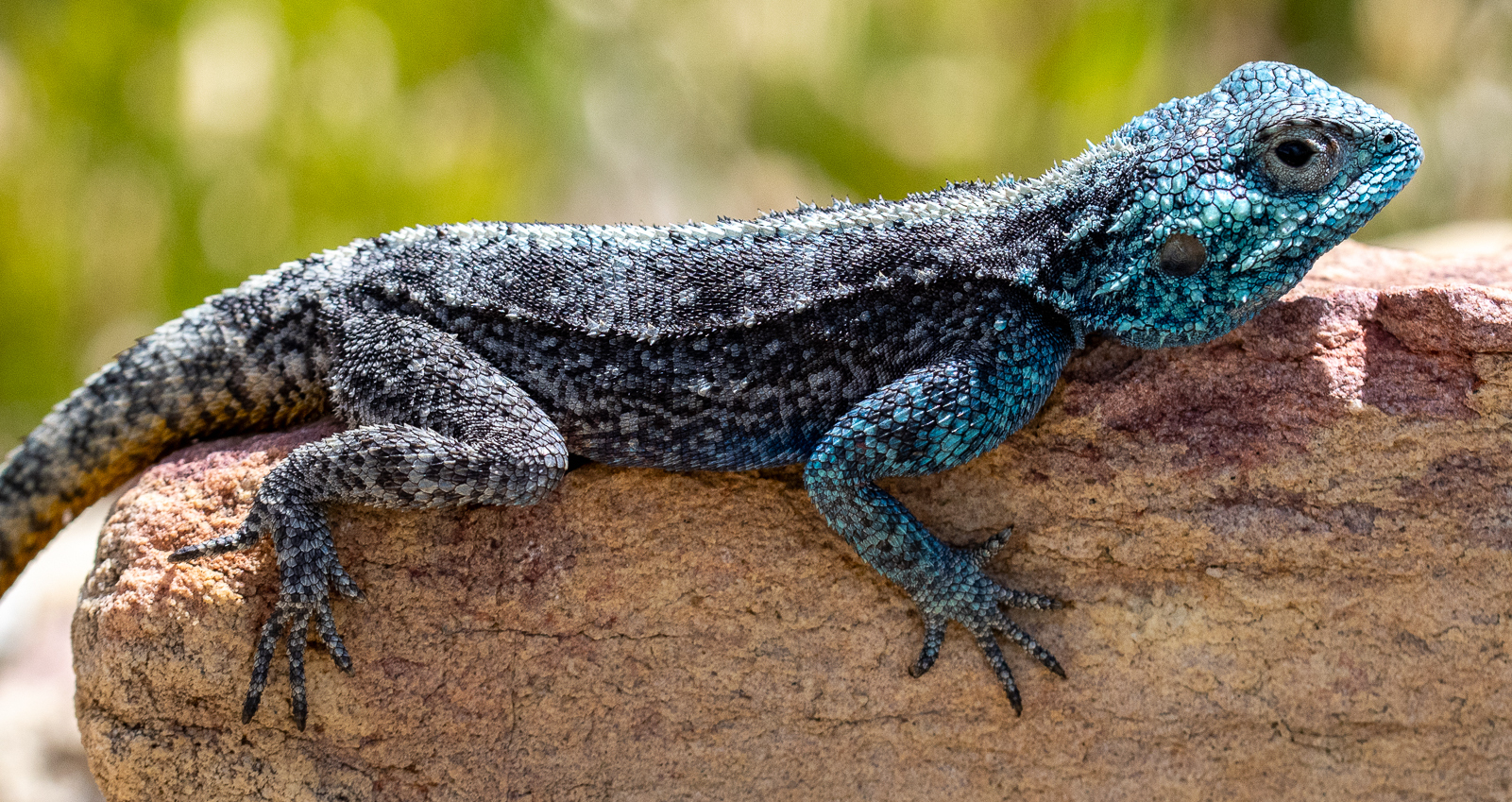
Male

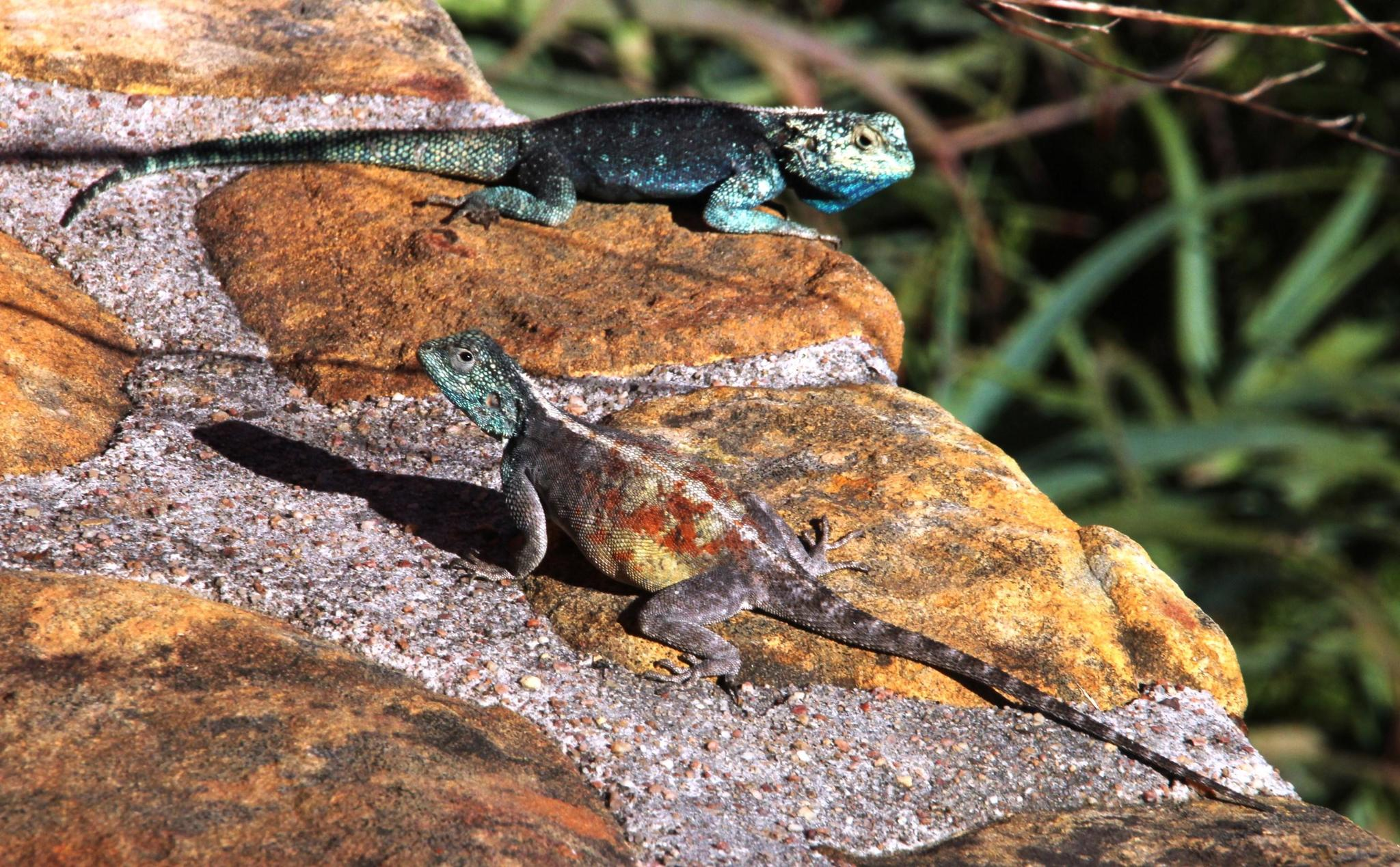
Male and female during the breeding season
