= List of reptiles of Togo =

This is a list of reptiles in Togo. There are 162 reptile species in Togo, including 4 crocodilian species, 49 lizard species, 97 snake species, and 12 turtle species. This list is derived from the Reptile Database which includes those reptiles that have recently been classified as extinct.

== Crocodilians (Crocodilia) ==
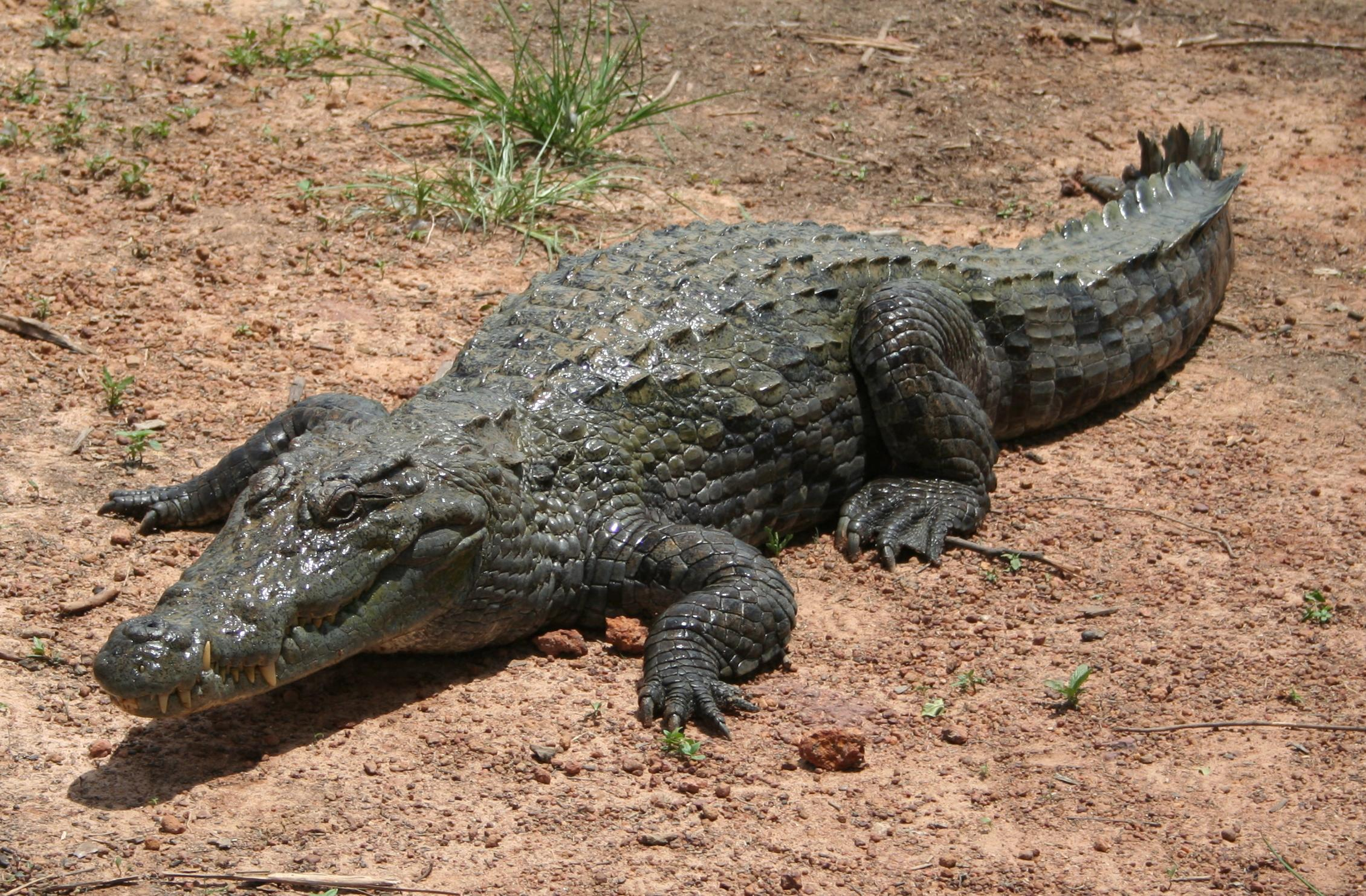
West African crocodile (Crocodylus suchus)

=== Crocodylidae ===
- Crocodylus niloticus Laurenti, 1768
- Crocodylus suchus Geoffroy Saint-hilaire, 1807
- Mecistops cataphractus Cuvier, 1825
- Osteolaemus tetraspis Cope, 1861

== Lizards (Squamata - suborder Lacertilia) ==
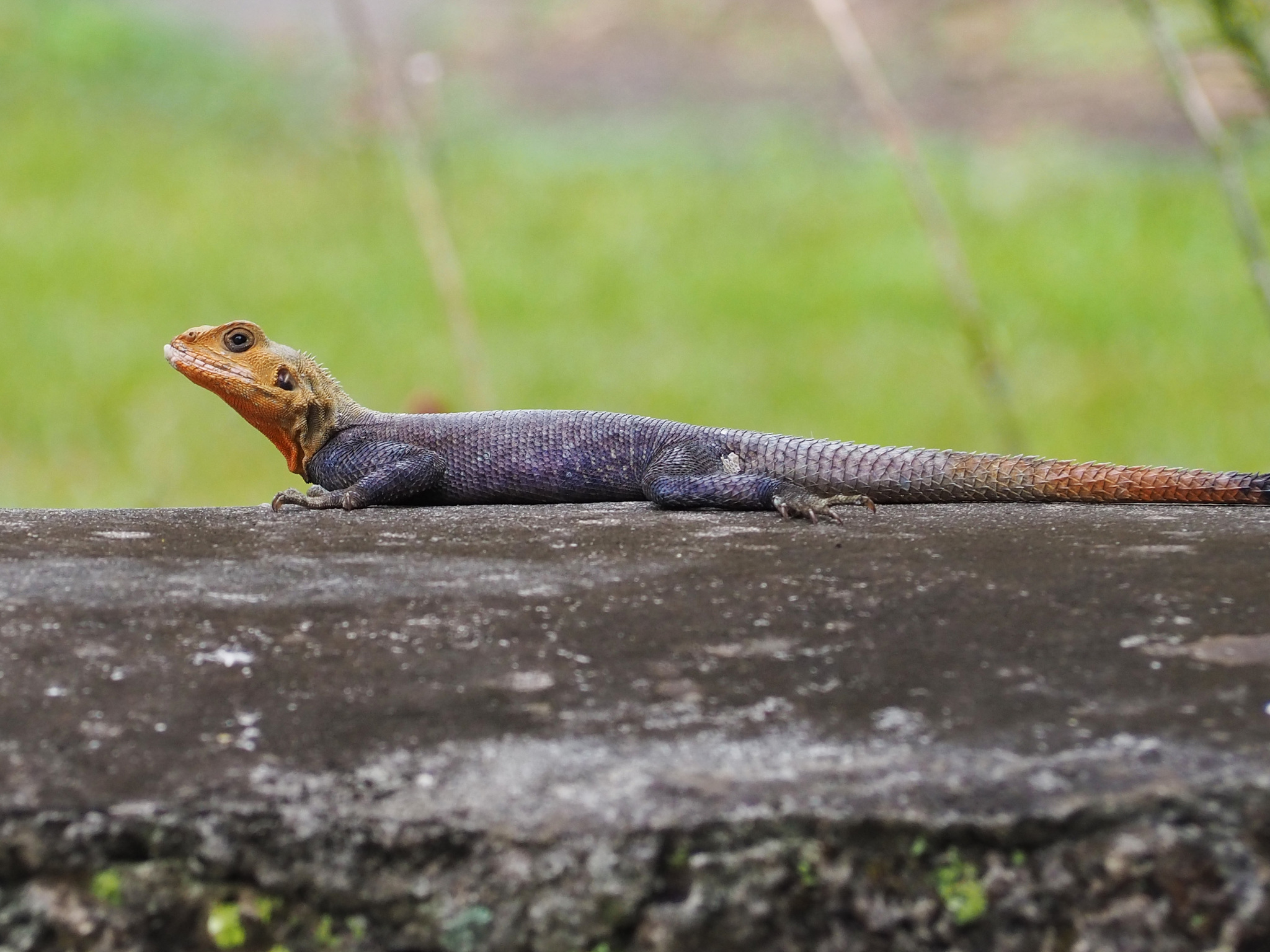
African redhead agama (Agama picticauda)

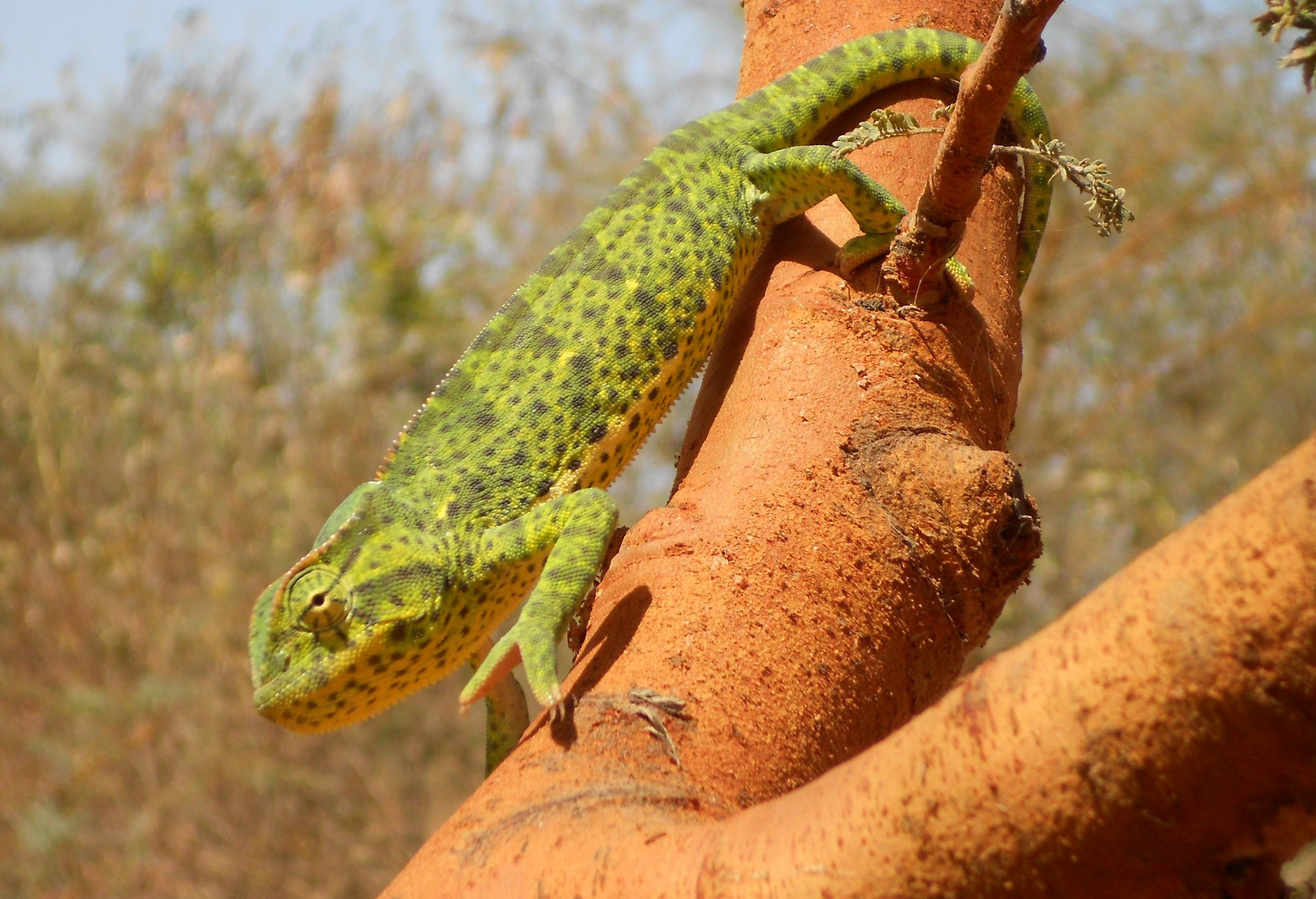
Senegal chameleon (Chamaeleo senegalensis)

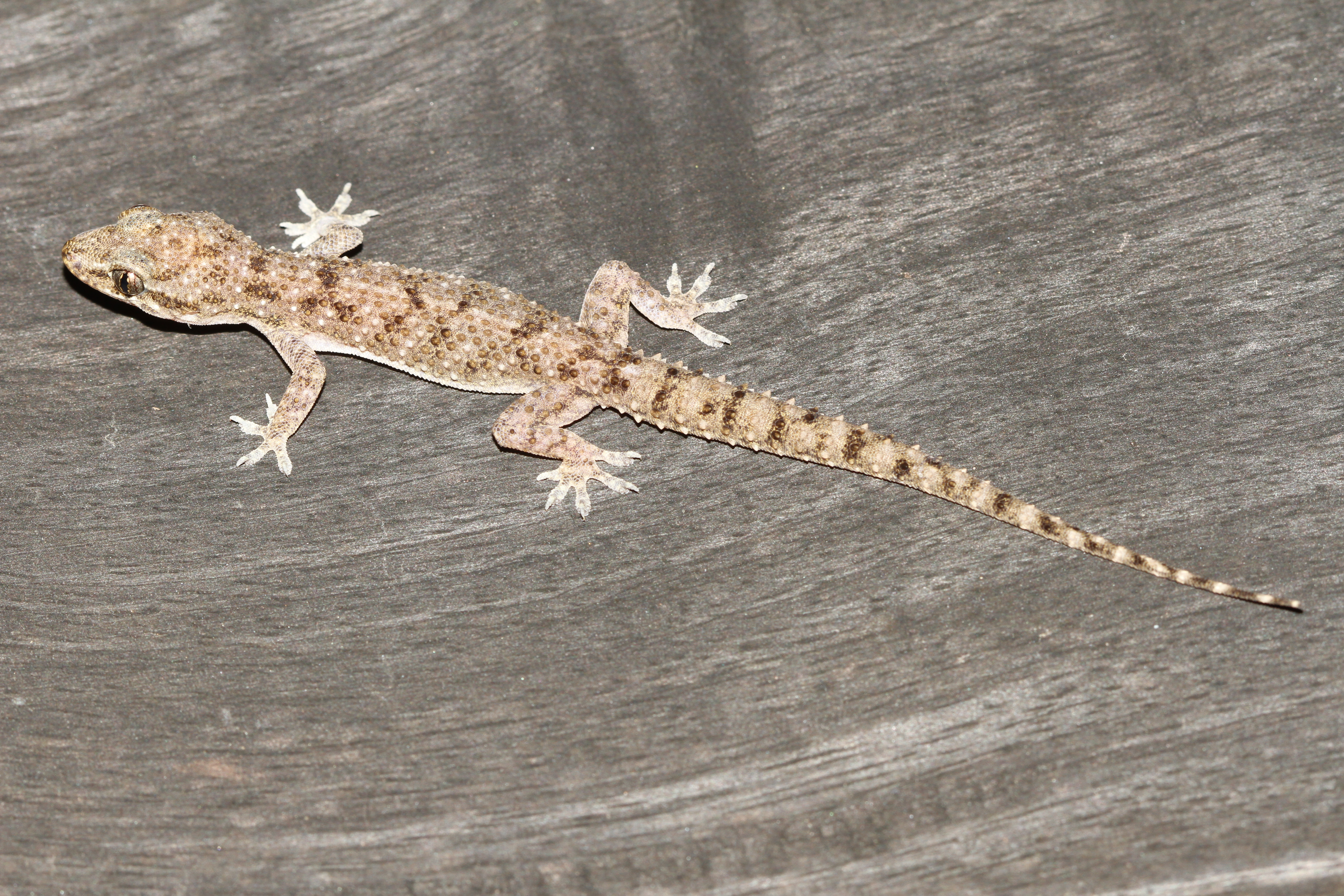
Brooke's house gecko (Hemidactylus brookii)

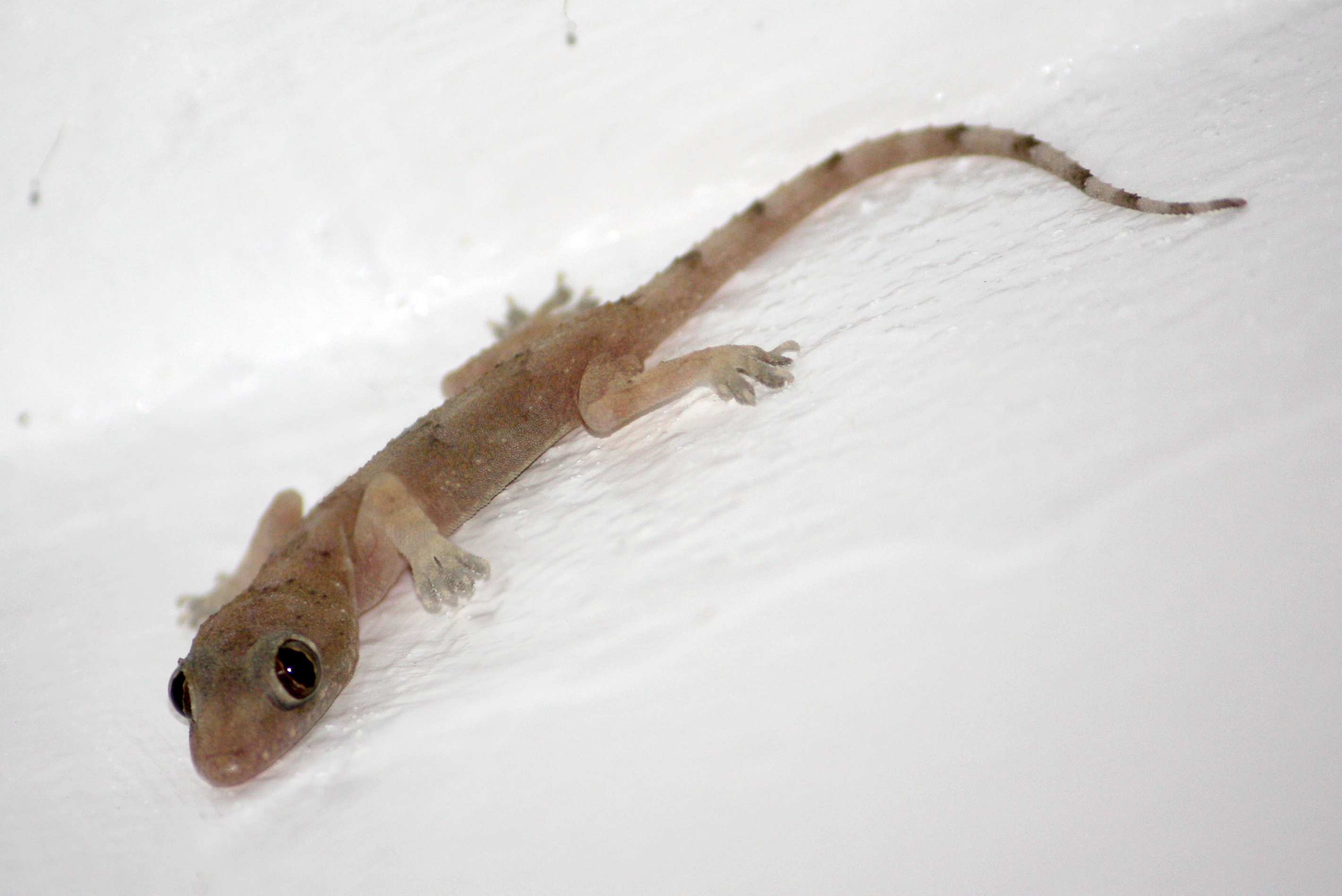
Tropical house gecko (Hemidactylus mabouia)

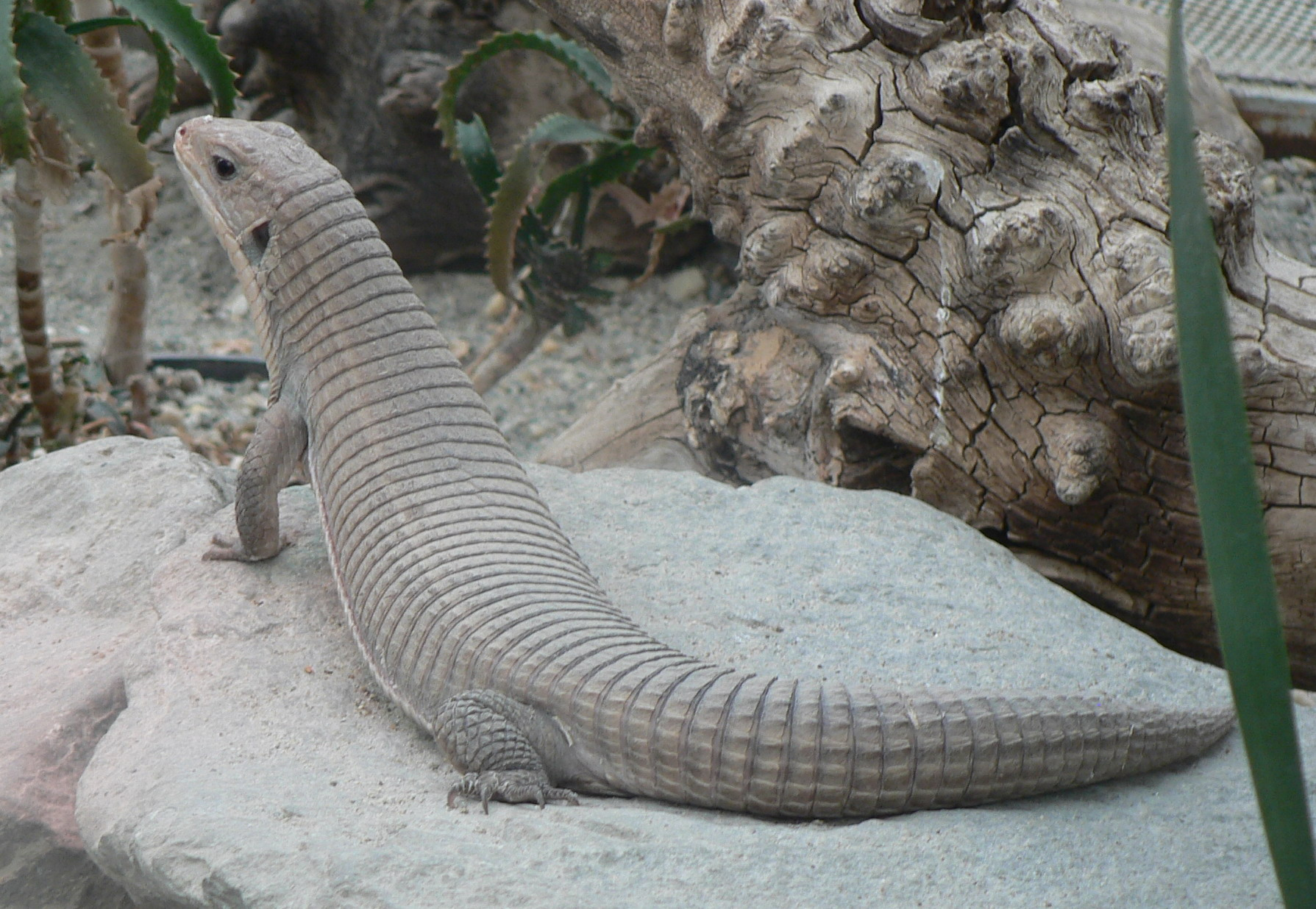
Sudan plated lizard (Broadleysaurus major)

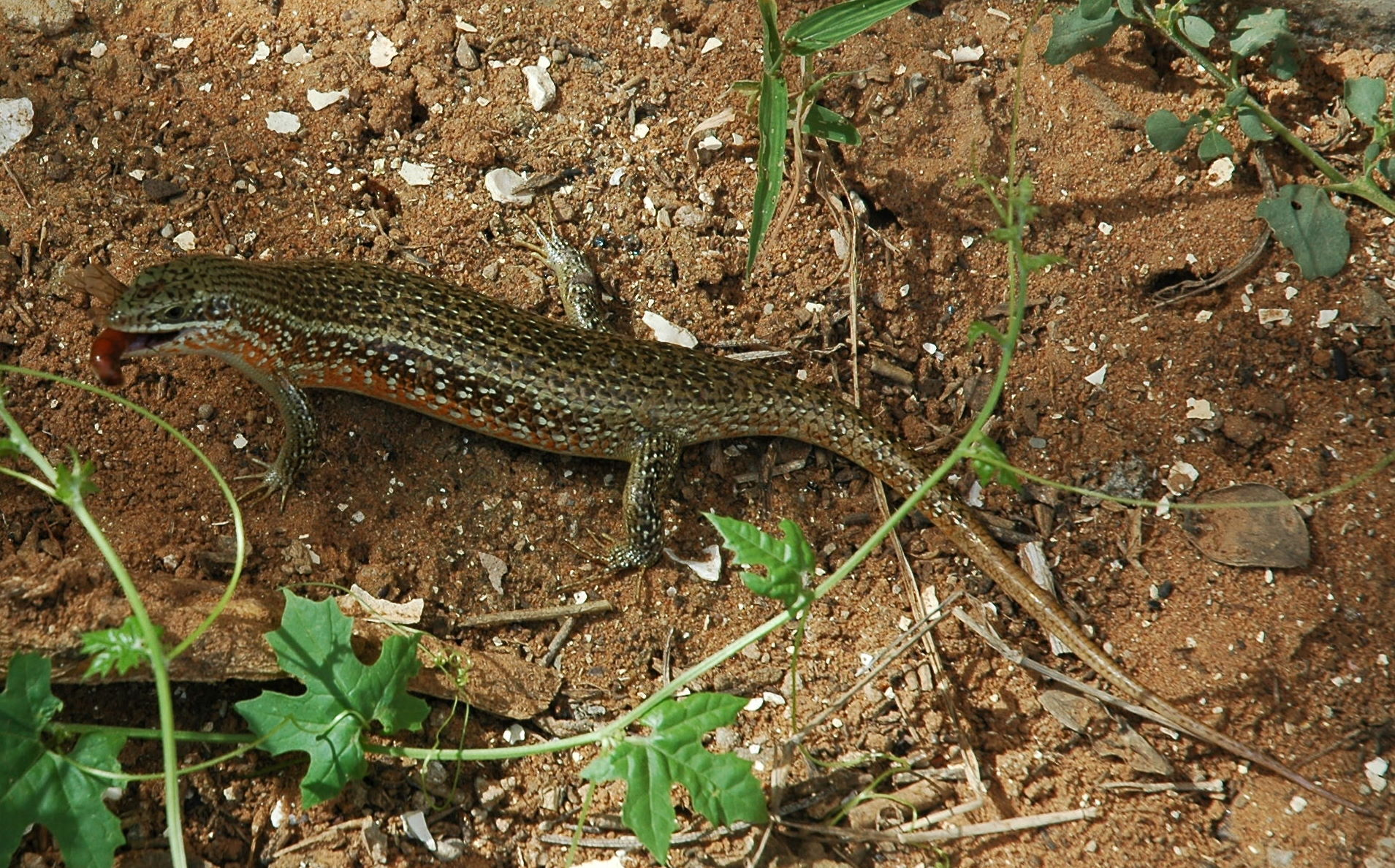
African red-sided skink (Trachylepis perrotetii)

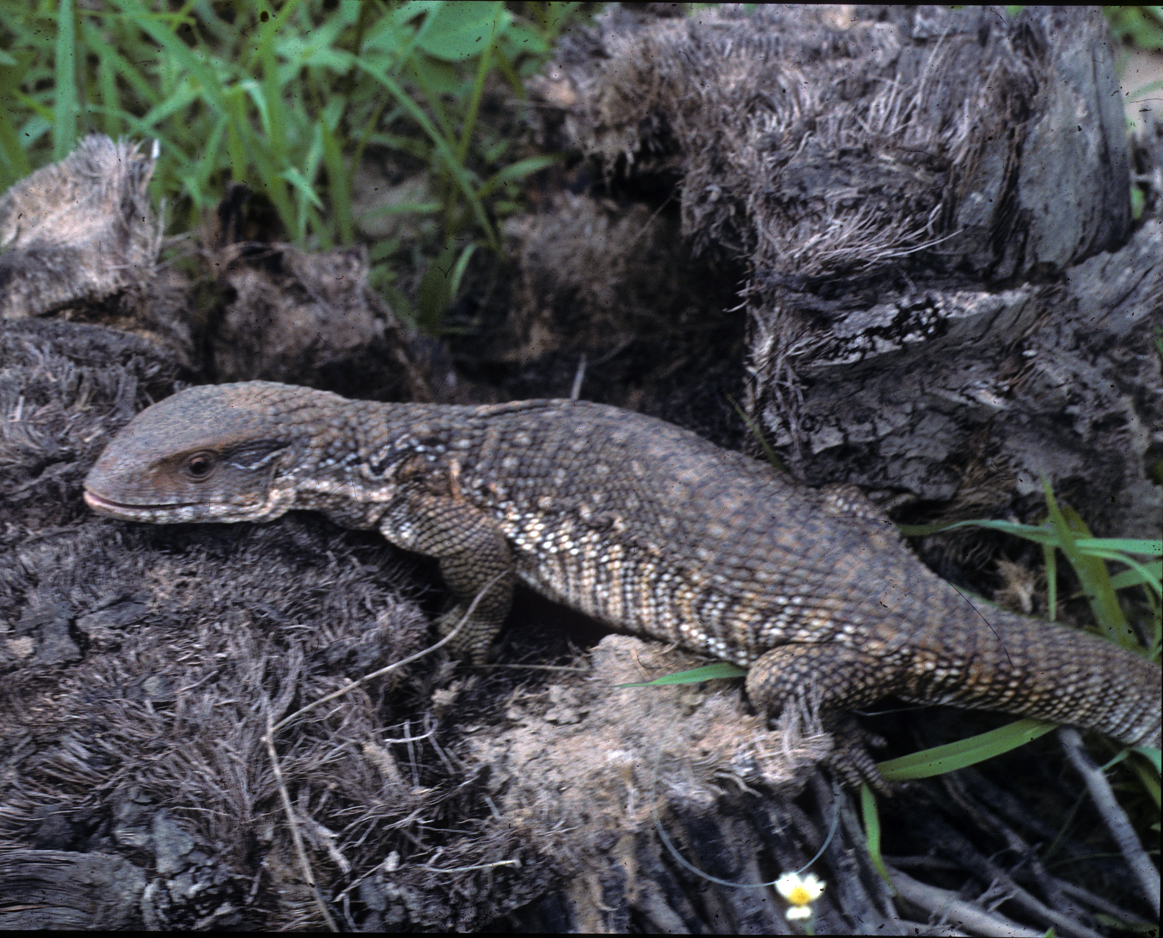
Savannah monitor (Varanus exanthematicus)

=== Agamidae ===
- Agama doriae Boulenger, 1885
- Agama gracilimembris Chabanaud, 1918
- Agama parafricana Trape, Mediannikov & Trape, 2012
- Agama paragama Grandison, 1968
- Agama picticauda Peters, 1877
- Agama sankaranica Chabanaud, 1918

=== Amphisbaenidae ===
- Cynisca leucura (Duméril & Bibron, 1839)
- Cynisca muelleri (Strauch, 1881)

=== Chamaeleonidae ===
- Chamaeleo dilepis Leach, 1819
- Chamaeleo gracilis Hallowell, 1844
- Chamaeleo necasi Ullenbruch, Krause & Böhme, 2007
- Chamaeleo senegalensis Daudin, 1802
- Trioceros cristatus (Stutchbury, 1837)

=== Eublepharidae ===
- Hemitheconyx caudicinctus (Duméril, 1851)

=== Gekkonidae ===
- Ancylodactylus spinicollis Müller, 1907
- Hemidactylus albituberculatus Trape, 2012
- Hemidactylus angulatus Hallowell, 1854
- Hemidactylus ansorgii Boulenger, 1901
- Hemidactylus brookii Gray, 1845
- Hemidactylus fasciatus Gray, 1842
- Hemidactylus kyaboboensis Wagner, Leaché & Fujita, 2014
- Hemidactylus mabouia (Moreau de Jonnès, 1818)
- Hemidactylus matschiei (Tornier, 1901)
- Hemidactylus muriceus Peters, 1870
- Lygodactylus conraui Tornier, 1902
- Lygodactylus gutturalis (Bocage, 1873)
- Lygodactylus picturatus (Peters, 1870)

=== Phyllodactylidae ===
- Ptyodactylus ragazzii Anderson, 1898
- Ptyodactylus togoensis Tornier, 1901
- Tarentola ephippiata O’Shaughnessy, 1875

=== Gerrhosauridae ===
- Broadleysaurus major (Duméril, 1851)

=== Lacertidae ===
- Acanthodactylus boueti Chabanaud, 1917
- Heliobolus nitidus (Günther, 1872)
- Holaspis guentheri Gray, 1863

=== Scincidae ===
- Chalcides thierryi Tornier, 1901
- Cophoscincopus greeri Böhme, Schmitz & Ziegler, 2000
- Cophoscincopus simulans (Vaillant, 1885)
- Mochlus fernandi (Burton, 1836)
- Mochlus guineensis (Peters, 1879)
- Panaspis togoensis (Werner, 1902)
- Trachylepis affinis (Gray, 1838)
- Trachylepis albilabris (Hallowell, 1857)
- Trachylepis buettneri (Matschie, 1893)
- Trachylepis maculilabris (Gray, 1845)
- Trachylepis perrotetii (Duméril & Bibron, 1839)
- Trachylepis polytropis (Boulenger, 1903)
- Trachylepis quinquetaeniata (Lichtenstein, 1823)

=== Varanidae ===
- Varanus exanthematicus (Bosc, 1792)
- Varanus niloticus (Linnaeus, 1766)

== Snakes (Squamata - suborder Serpentes) ==
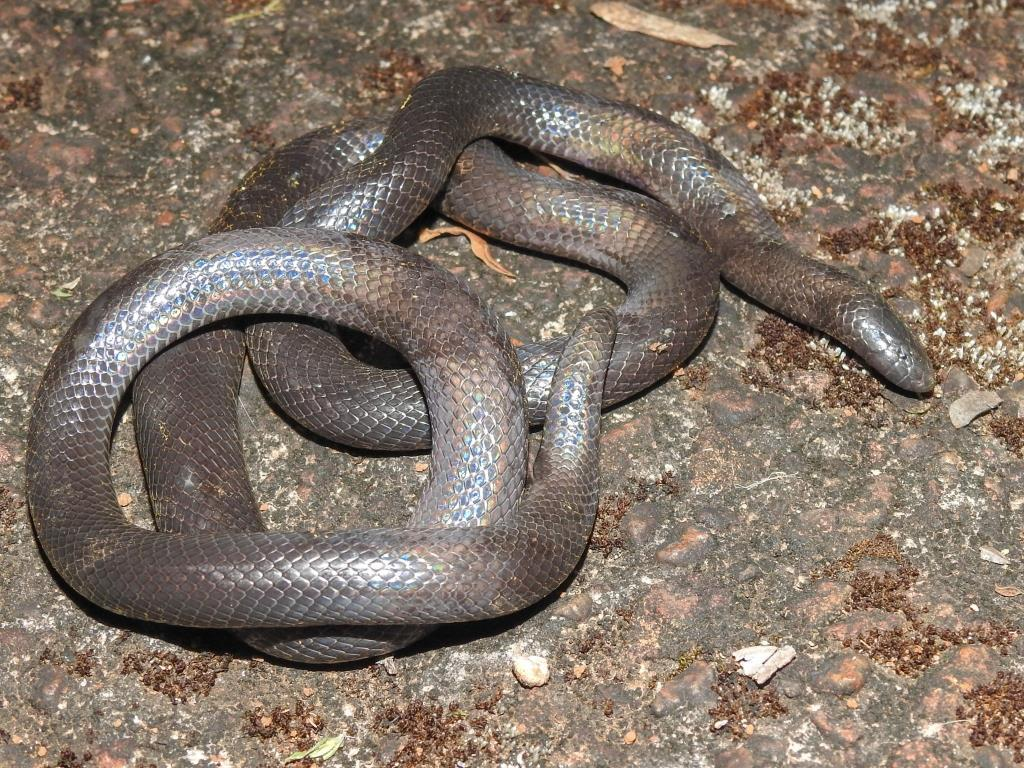
Slender burrowing asp (Atractaspis aterrima)

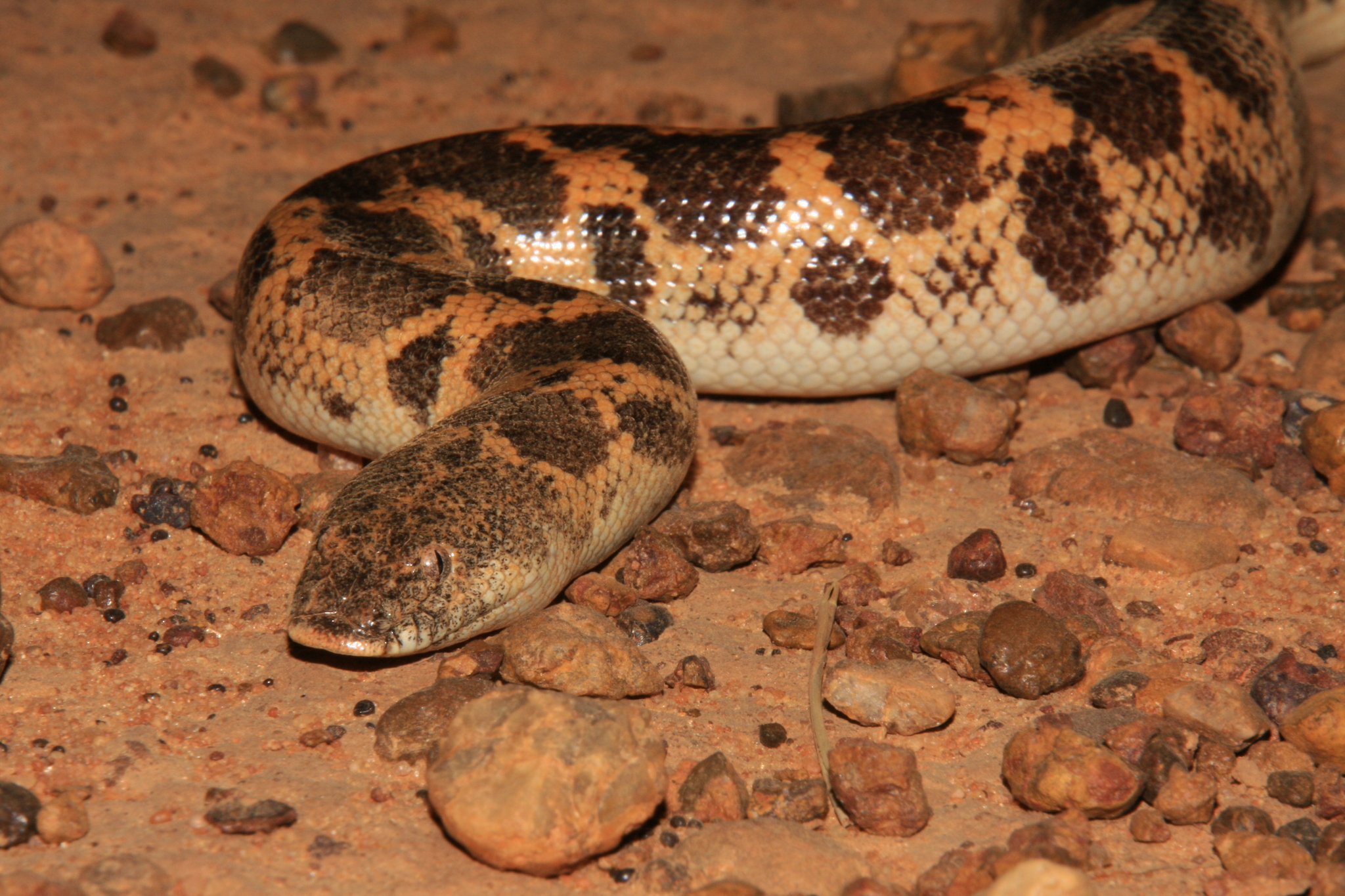
Saharan sand boa (Eryx muelleri)

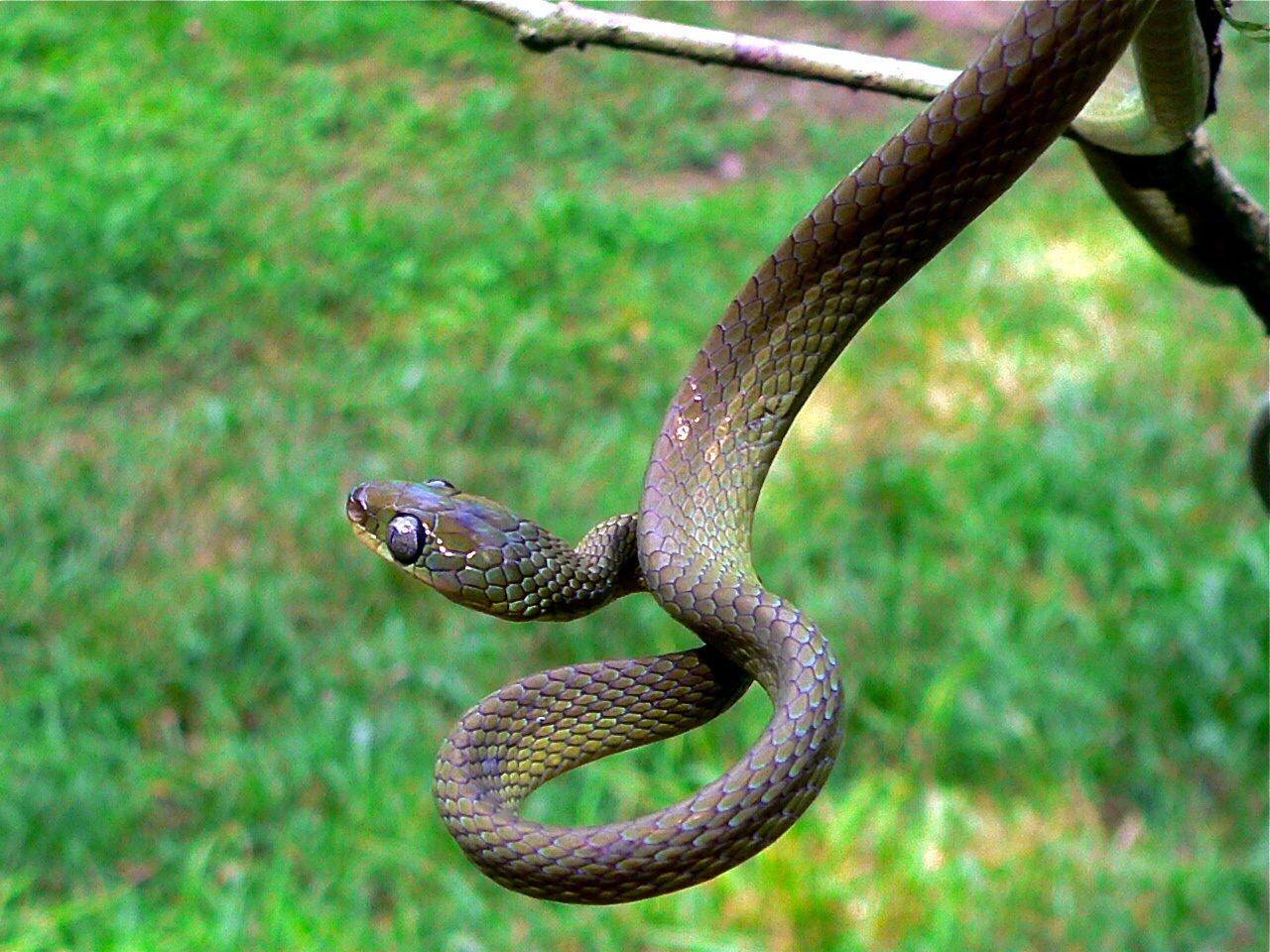
Laurent's tree snake (Dipsadoboa viridis)

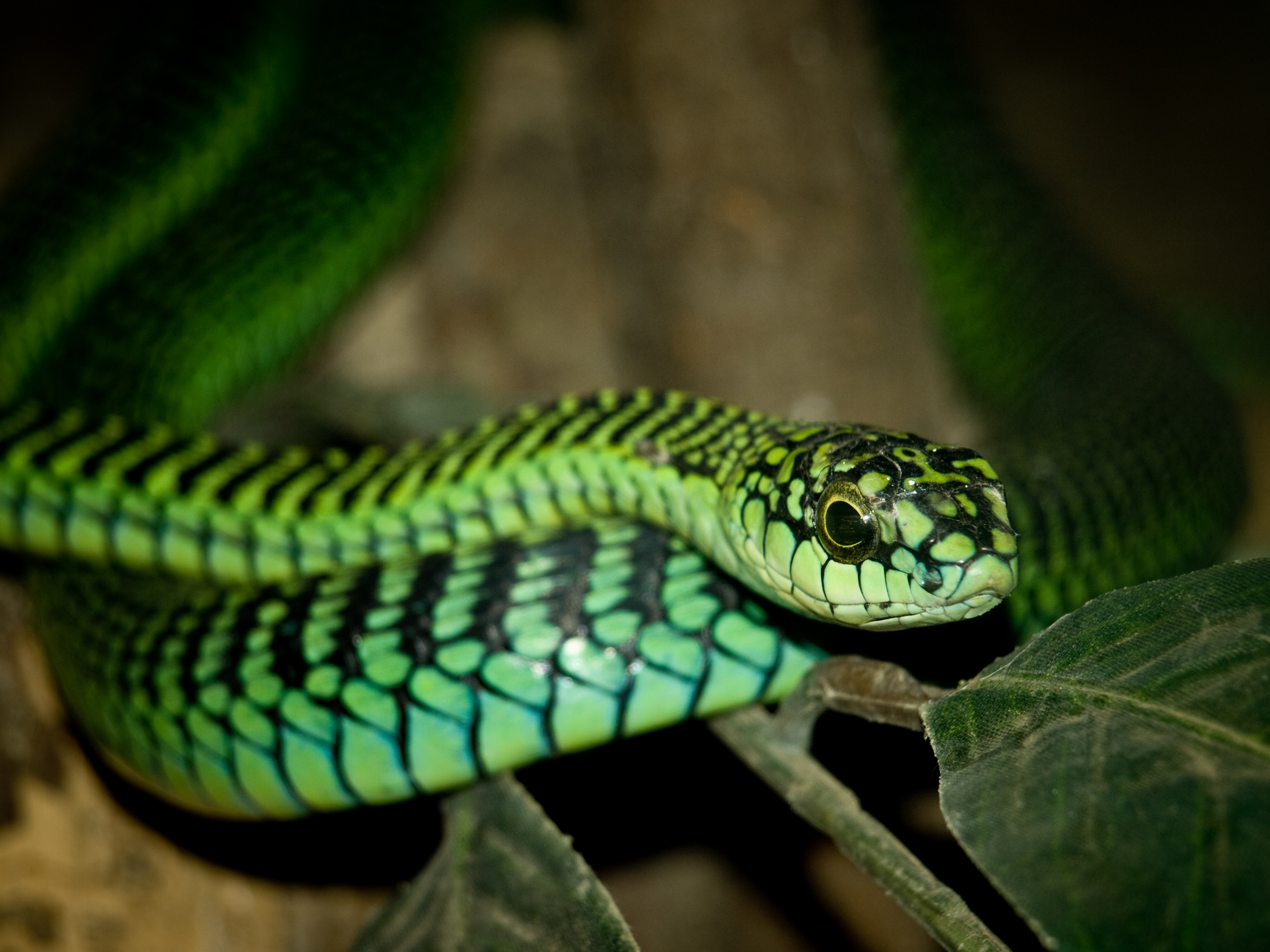
Boomslang (Dispholidus typus)

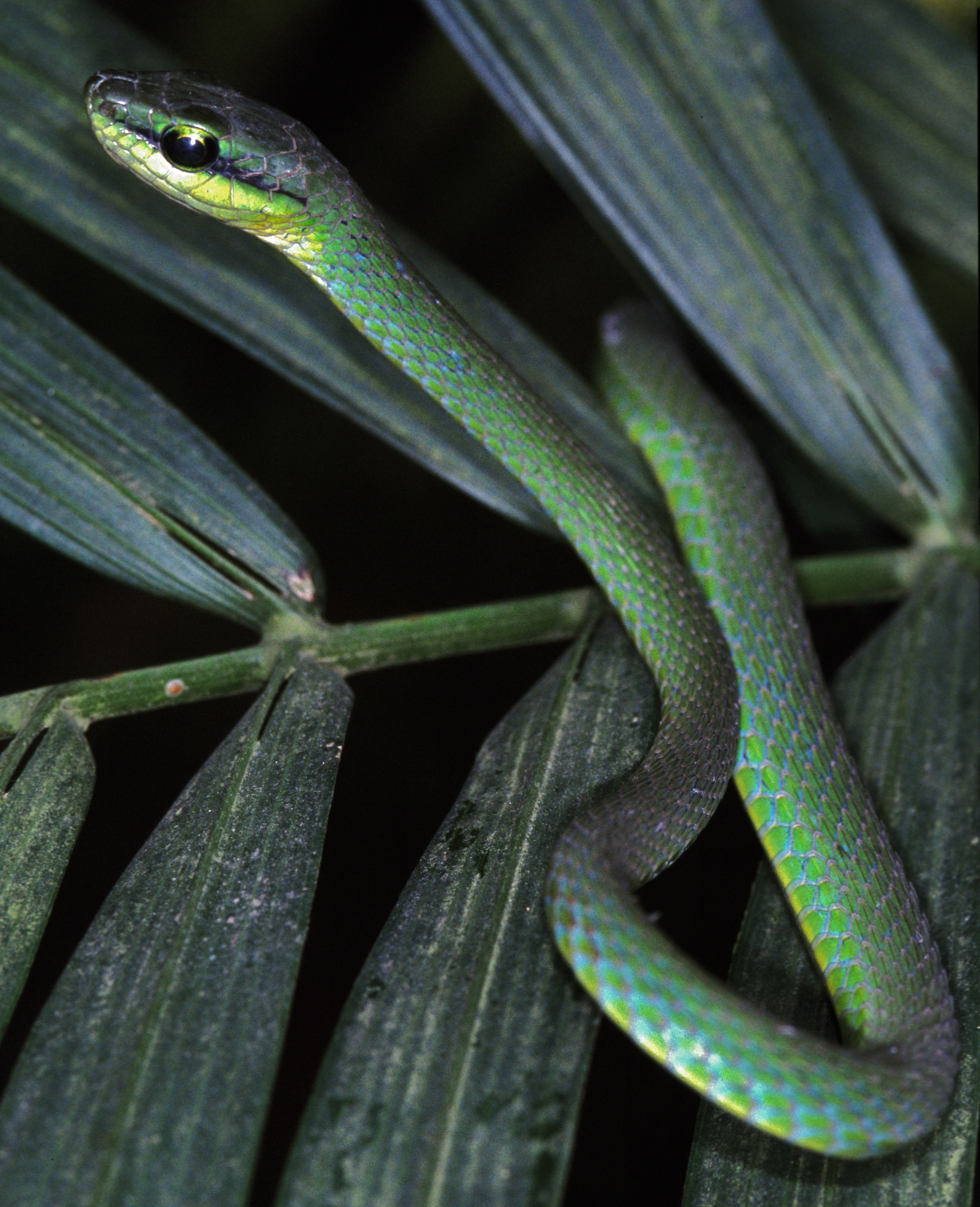
Emerald snake (Hapsidophrys smaragdina)

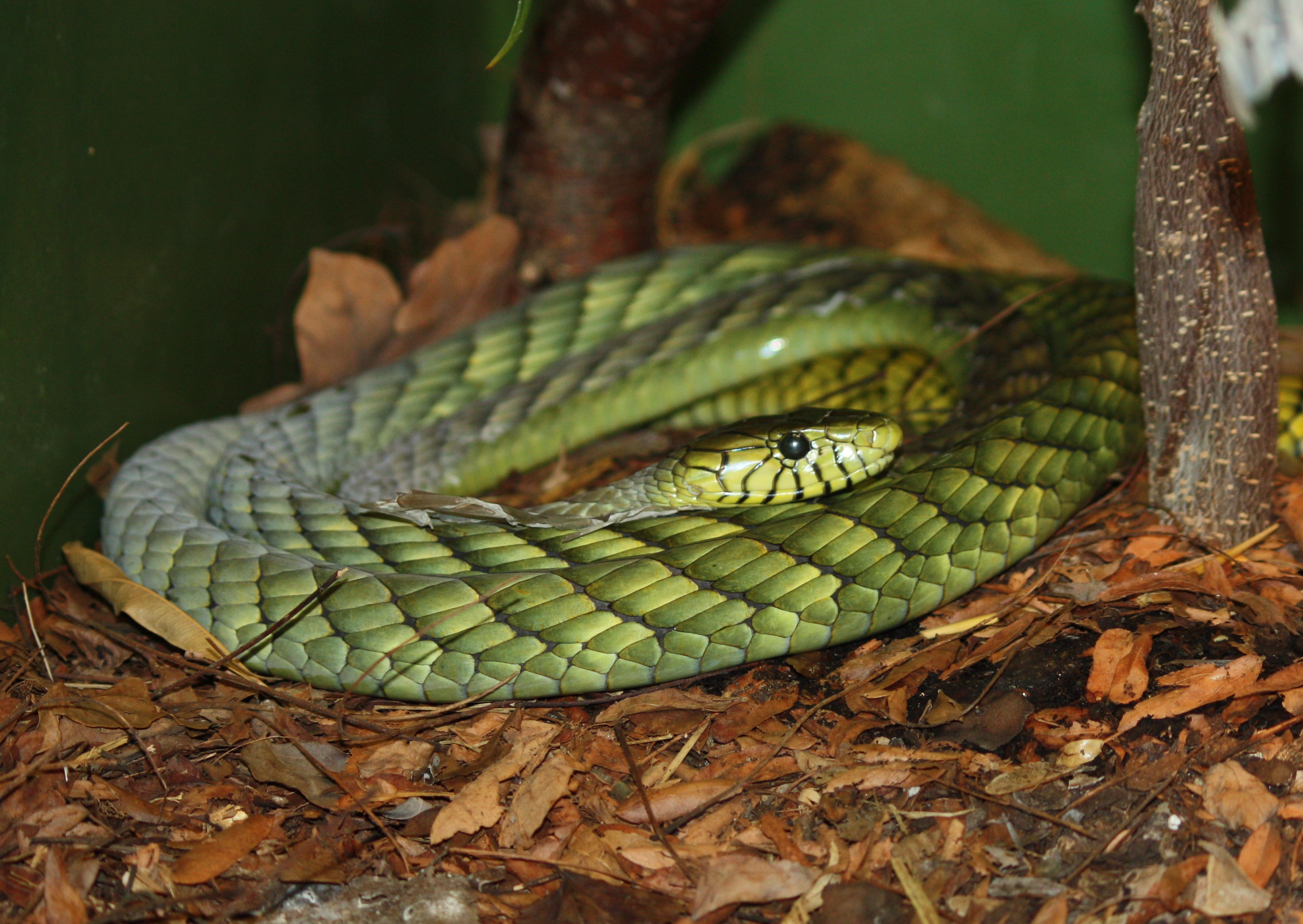
Western green mamba (Dendroaspis viridis)

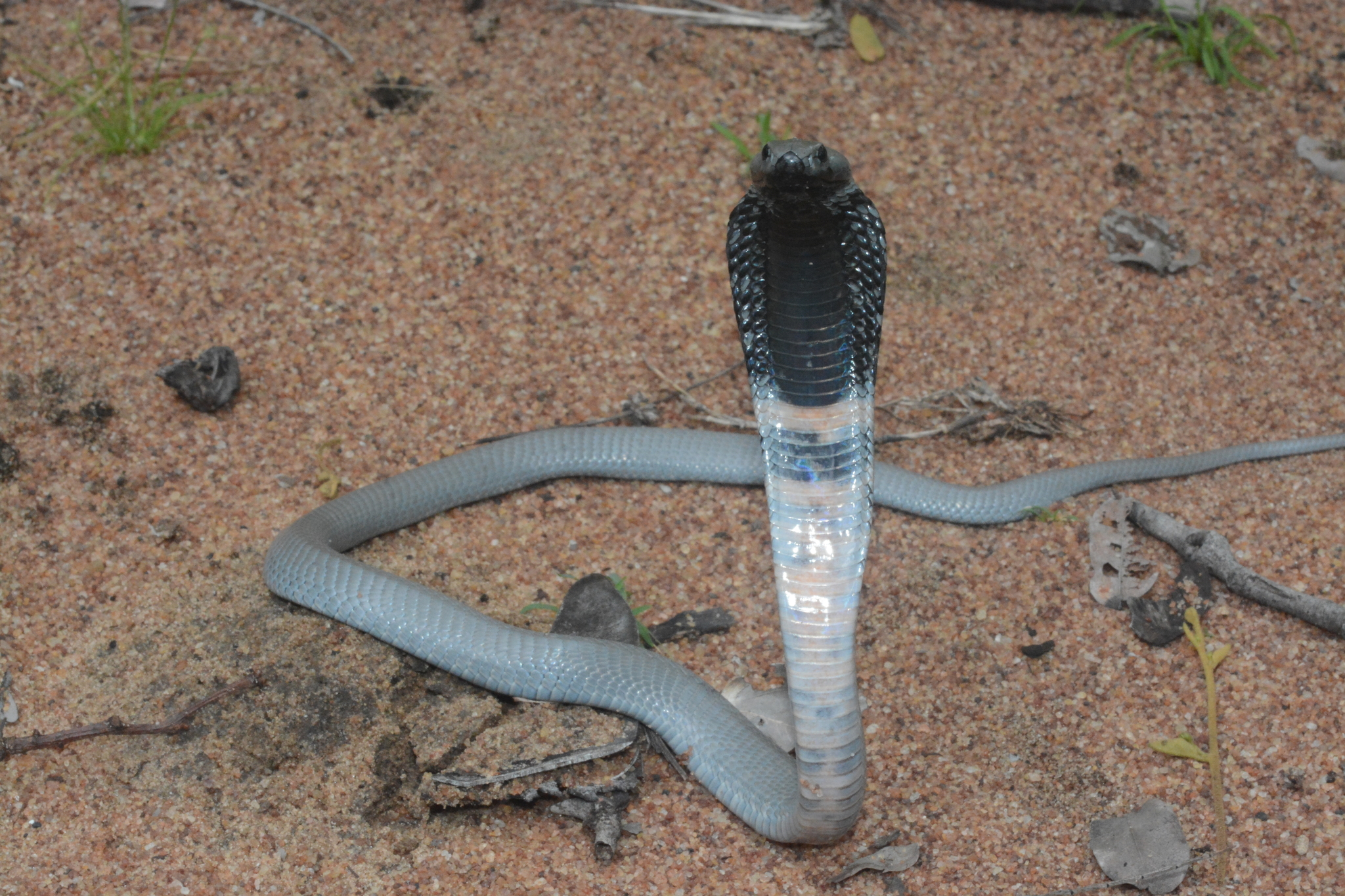
Black-necked spitting cobra (Naja nigricollis)

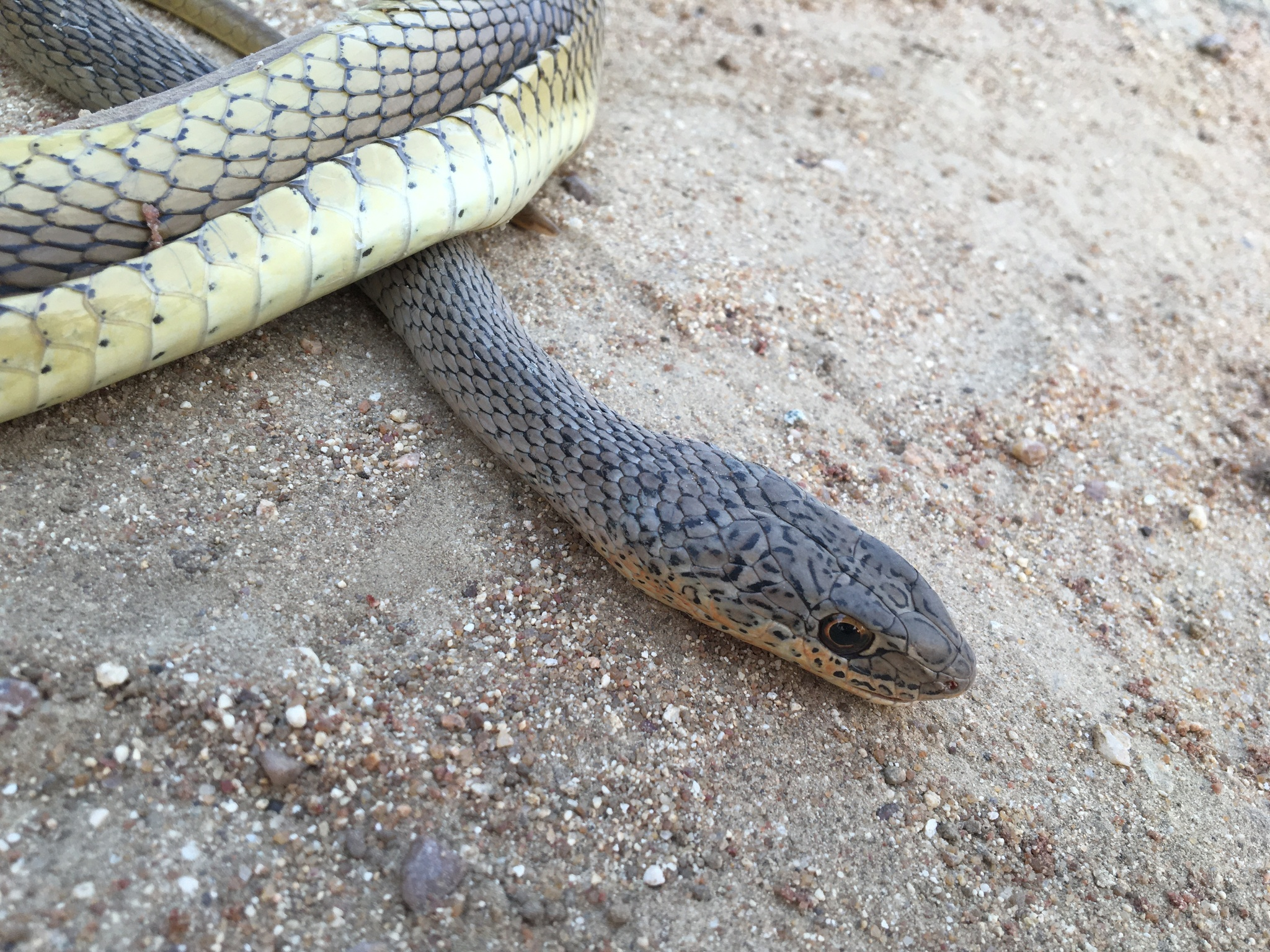
Olive grass racer (Psammophis phillipsii)

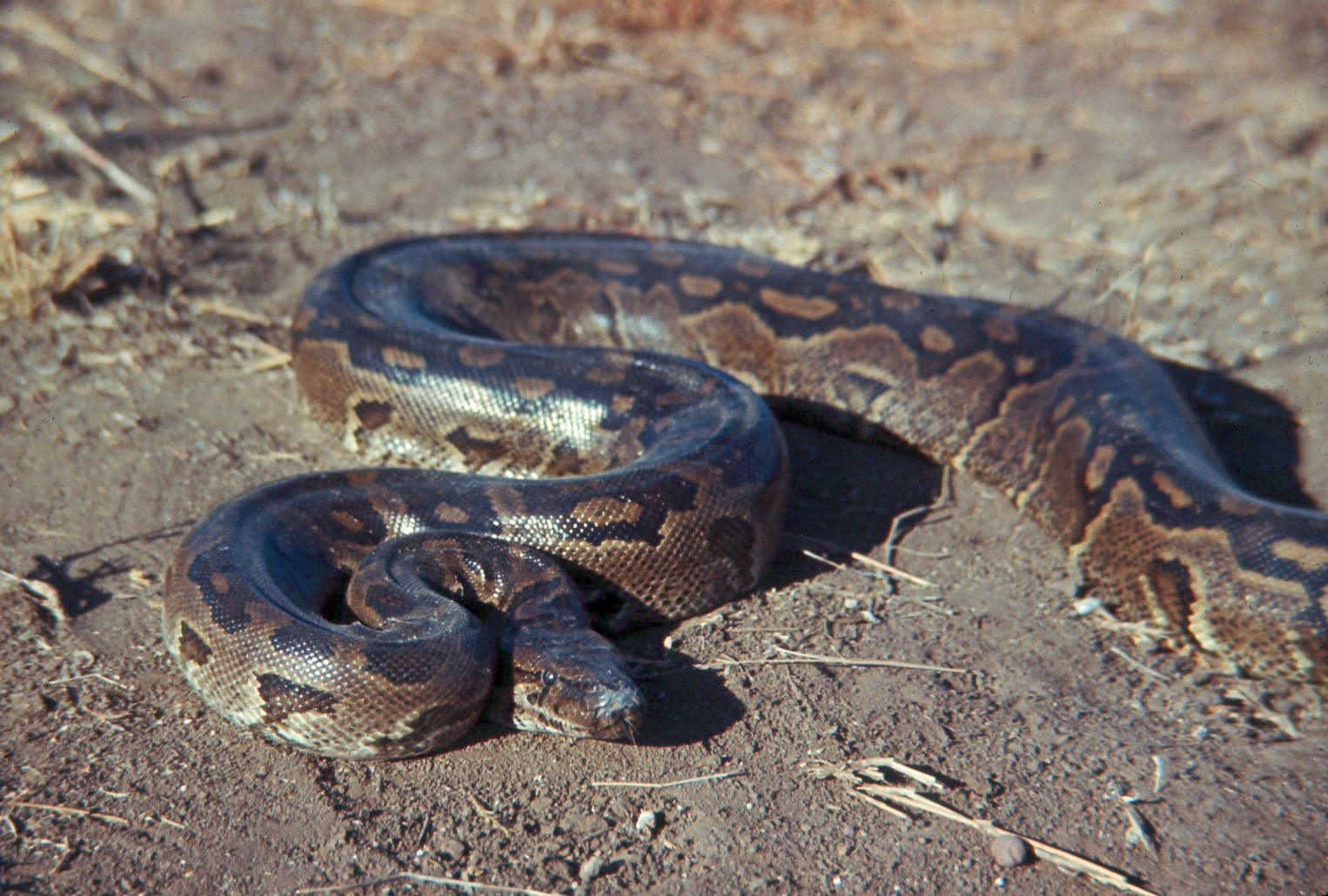
Central African rock python (Python sebae)

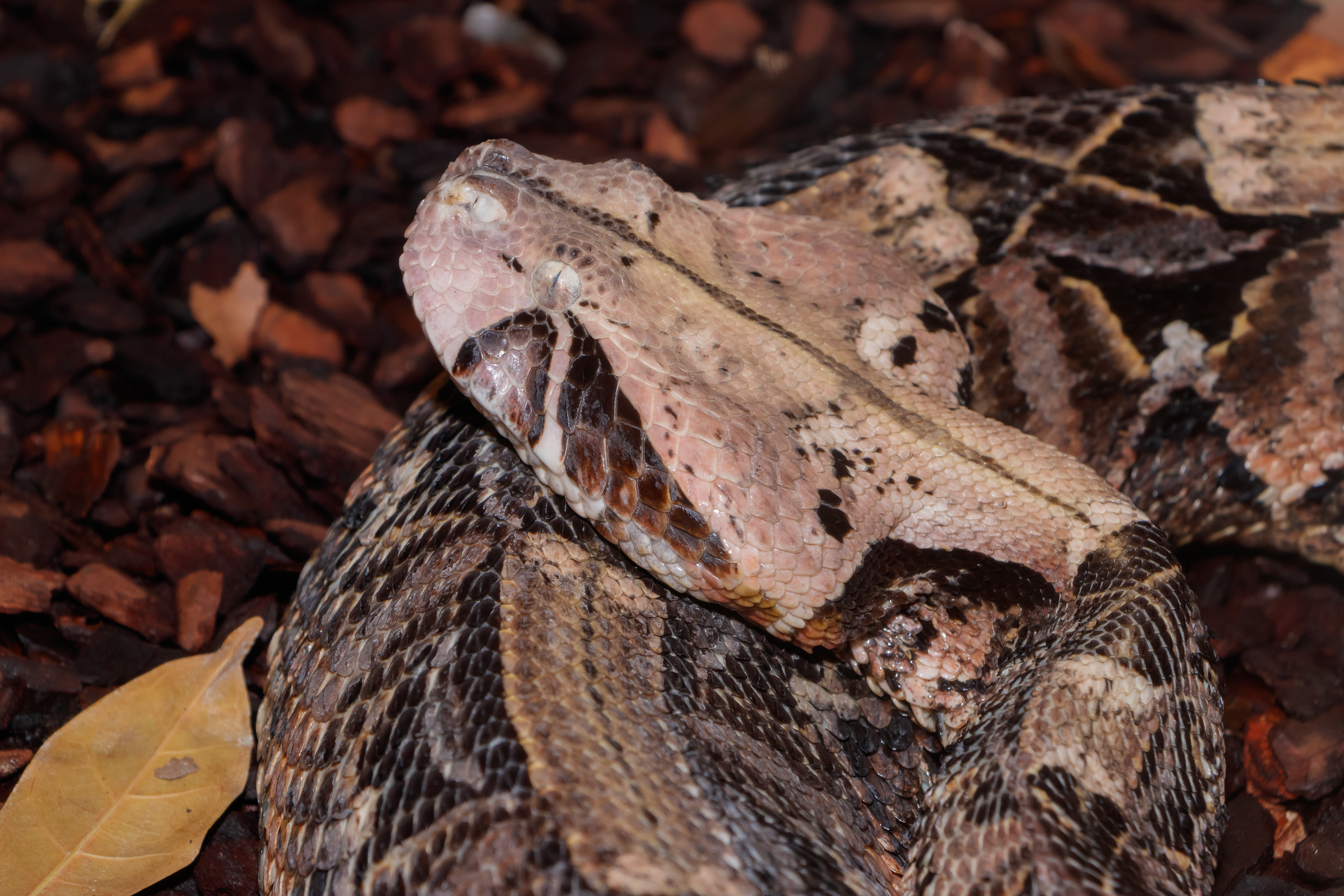
Gaboon viper (Bitis gabonica)

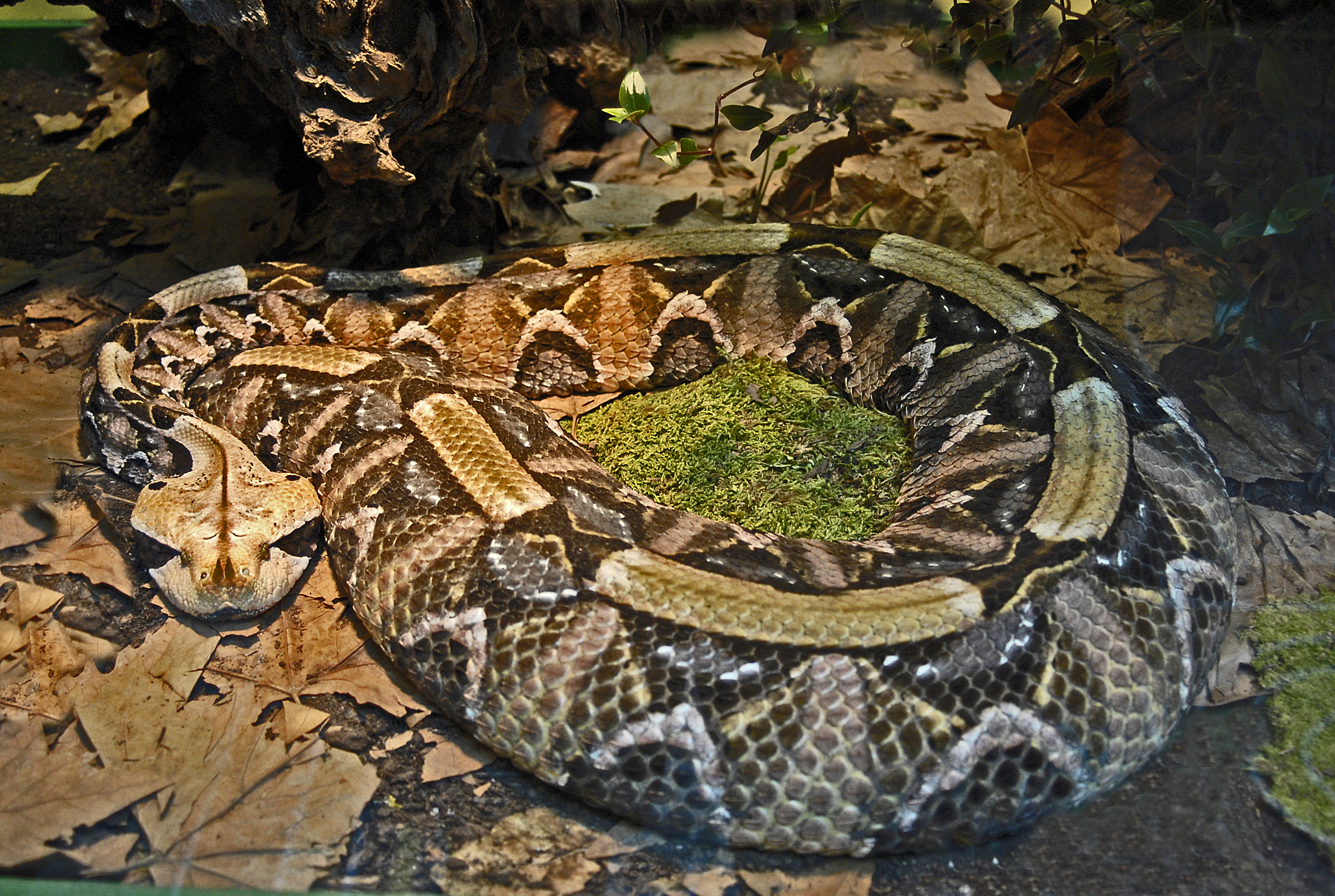
West African Gaboon viper (Bitis nasicornis)

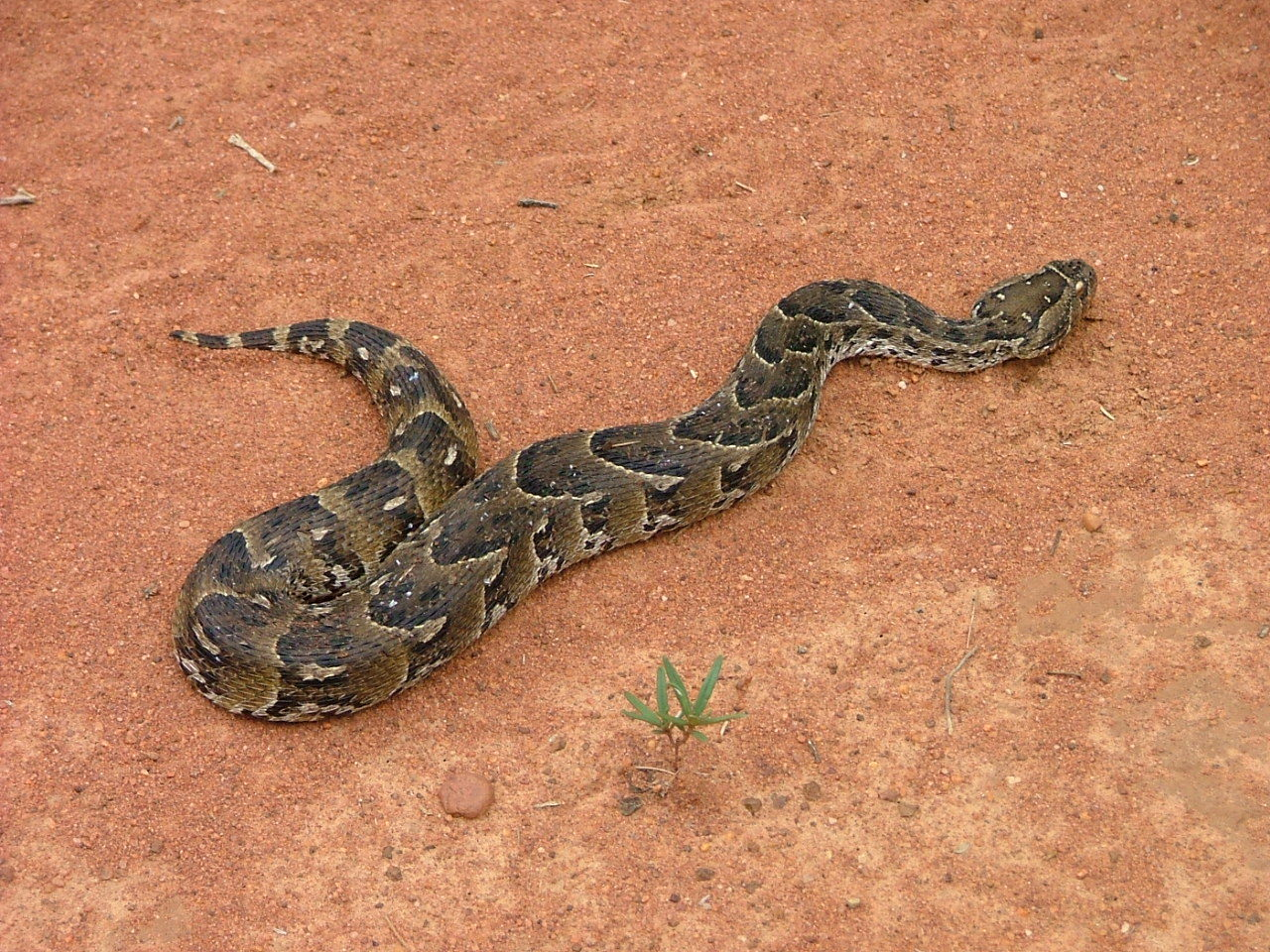
Puff adder (Bitis arietans)

=== Atractaspididae ===
- Amblyodipsas unicolor (Reinhardt, 1843)
- Aparallactus lunulatus (Peters, 1854)
- Aparallactus modestus (Günther, 1859)
- Atractaspis aterrima Günther, 1863
- Atractaspis dahomeyensis Bocage, 1887
- Atractaspis irregularis (Reinhardt, 1843)
- Polemon acanthias (Reinhardt, 1861)
- Polemon neuwiedi (Jan, 1858)

=== Boidae ===
- Calabaria reinhardtii (Schlegel, 1851)
- Eryx muelleri (Boulenger, 1892)

=== Colubridae ===
- Afronatrix anoscopus (Cope, 1861)
- Bamanophis dorri (Lataste, 1888)
- Crotaphopeltis hippocrepis (Reinhardt, 1843)
- Crotaphopeltis hotamboeia (Laurenti, 1768)
- Dasypeltis confusa Trape & Mané, 2006
- Dasypeltis fasciata Smith, 1849
- Dasypeltis gansi Trape & Mané, 2006
- Dasypeltis parascabra Trape, Mediannikov & Trape, 2012
- Dipsadoboa brevirostris (Sternfeld, 1908)
- Dipsadoboa riparia Trape, Mediannikov & Baldé, 2023
- Dipsadoboa underwoodi Rasmussen, 1993
- Dipsadoboa unicolor Günther, 1858
- Dipsadoboa viridis (Peters, 1869)
- Dispholidus typus (Smith, 1828)
- Grayia smithii (Leach, 1818)
- Hapsidophrys lineata Fischer, 1856
- Hapsidophrys smaragdina (Schlegel, 1837)
- Meizodon coronatus (Schlegel, 1837)
- Meizodon regularis Fischer, 1856
- Natriciteres fuliginoides (Günther, 1858)
- Natriciteres olivacea (Peters, 1854)
- Natriciteres variegata (Peters, 1861)
- Philothamnus carinatus (Andersson, 1901)
- Philothamnus heterodermus (Hallowell, 1857)
- Philothamnus irregularis (Leach, 1819)
- Philothamnus nitidus (Günther, 1863)
- Philothamnus semivariegatus (Smith, 1840)
- Rhamnophis aethiopissa Günther, 1862
- Rhamphiophis oxyrhynchus (Reinhardt, 1843)
- Scaphiophis albopunctatus Peters, 1870
- Telescopus variegatus (Reinhardt, 1843)
- Thelotornis kirtlandii (Hallowell, 1844)
- Thrasops occidentalis Parker, 1940
- Toxicodryas blandingii (Hallowell, 1844)
- Toxicodryas pulverulenta (Fischer, 1856)

=== Elapidae ===
- Dendroaspis jamesoni (Traill, 1843)
- Dendroaspis viridis (Hallowell, 1844)
- Elapsoidea semiannulata Bocage, 1882
- Naja guineensis Broadley, Trape, Chirio, Ineich & Wüster, 2018
- Naja katiensis Angel, 1922
- Naja nigricollis Reinhardt, 1843
- Naja savannula Broadley, Trape, Chirio & Wüster, 2018
- Pseudohaje nigra Günther, 1858

=== Lamprophiidae ===
- Boaedon fuliginosus (Boie, 1827)
- Boaedon lineatus Duméril, Bibron & Duméril, 1854
- Boaedon olivaceus (Duméril, 1856)
- Boaedon virgatus (Hallowell, 1854)
- Chamaelycus fasciatus (Günther, 1858)
- Gonionotophis grantii (Günther, 1863)
- Gonionotophis klingi Matschie, 1893
- Hormonotus modestus (Duméril, Bibron & Duméril, 1854)
- Limaformosa crossi (Boulenger, 1895)
- Limaformosa guirali (Mocquard, 1887)
- Lycophidion irroratum (Leach, 1819)
- Lycophidion laterale Hallowell, 1857
- Lycophidion nigromaculatum (Peters, 1863)
- Lycophidion semicinctum Duméril, Bibron & Duméril, 1854
- Mehelya poensis (Smith, 1849)
- Mehelya stenophthalmus (Mocquard, 1887)

=== Leptotyphlopidae ===
- Myriopholis boueti (Chabanaud, 1917)
- Myriopholis narirostris (Peters, 1867)
- Tricheilostoma bicolor (Jan, 1860)
- Tricheilostoma sundewalli (Jan, 1862)

=== Prosymnidae ===
- Prosymna collaris Sternfeld, 1908
- Prosymna greigerti Mocquard, 1906
- Prosymna meleagris (Reinhardt, 1843)

=== Psammophiidae ===
- Hemirhagerrhis nototaenia (Günther, 1864)
- Kladirostratus togoensis (Matschie, 1893)
- Psammophis afroccidentalis Trape, Böhme & Mediannikov, 2019
- Psammophis elegans (Shaw, 1802)
- Psammophis lineatus (Duméril, Bibron & Duméril, 1854)
- Psammophis mossambicus Peters, 1882
- Psammophis phillipsii (Hallowell, 1844)
- Psammophis praeornatus (Schlegel, 1837)

=== Pythonidae ===
- Python regius (Shaw, 1802)
- Python sebae (Gmelin, 1789)

=== Typhlopidae ===
- Afrotyphlops lineolatus (Jan, 1864)
- Afrotyphlops punctatus (Leach, 1819)
- Letheobia crossii (Boulenger, 1893)

=== Viperidae ===
- Atheris chlorechis (Pel, 1852)
- Atheris squamigera Hallowell, 1854
- Causus maculatus (Hallowell, 1842)
- Bitis arietans Merrem, 1820
- Bitis gabonica Duméril, Bibron & Duméril, 1854
- Bitis nasicornis (Shaw & Nodder, 1792)
- Bitis rhinoceros (Schlegel, 1855)
- Echis ocellatus Stemmler, 1970

== Turtles (Testudines) ==
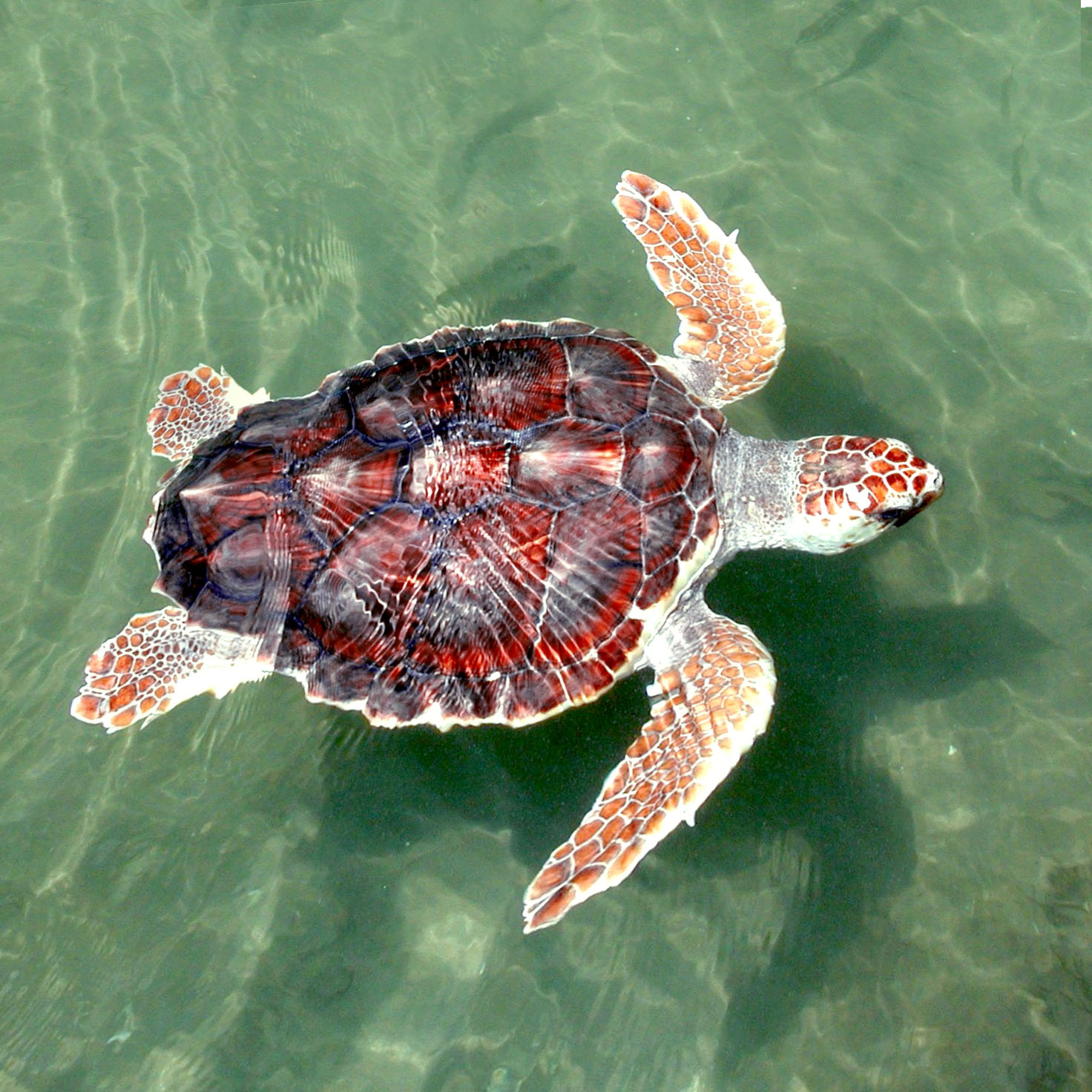
Loggerhead sea turtle (Caretta caretta)

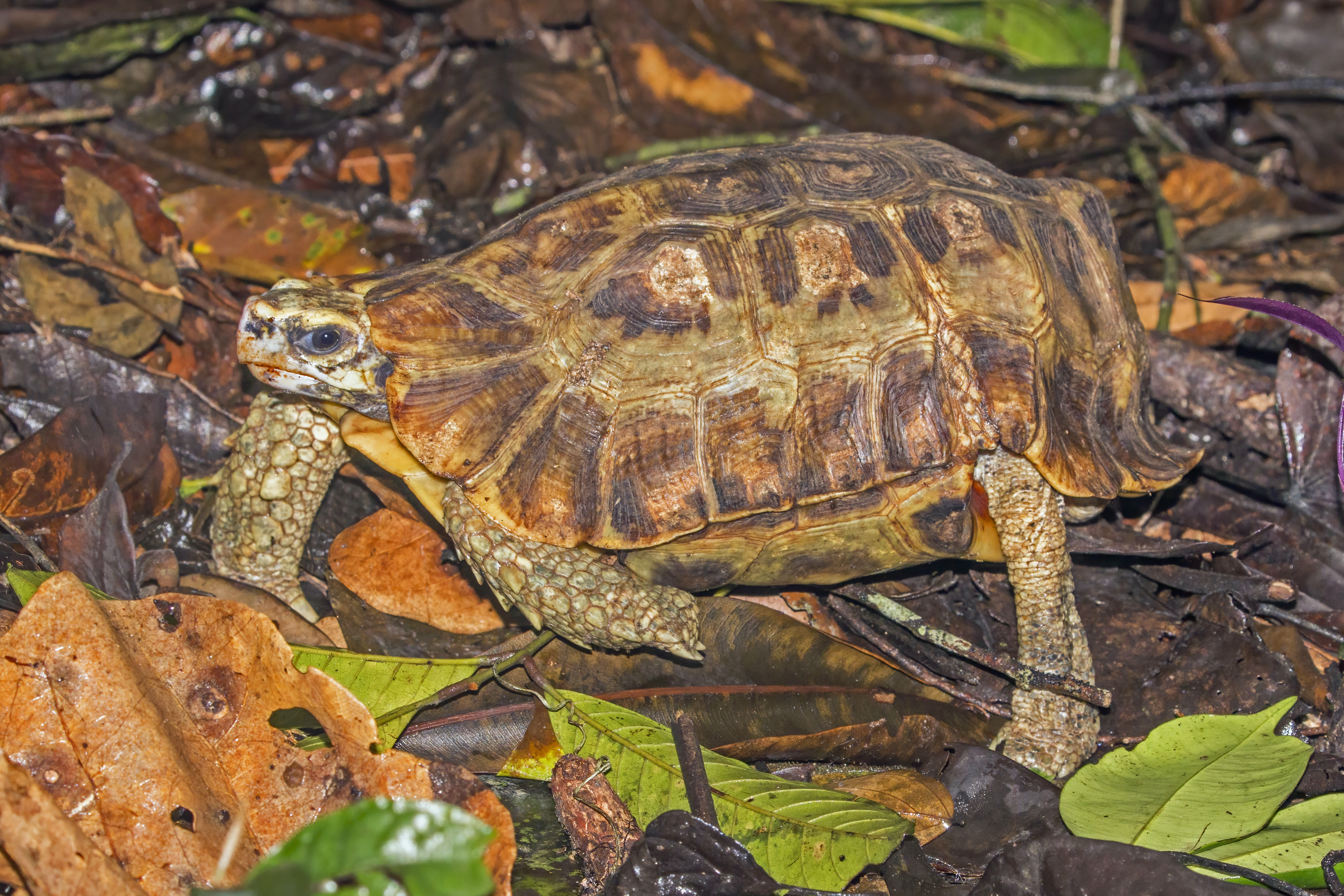
Home's hinge-back tortoise (Kinixys homeana)

=== Cheloniidae ===
- Caretta caretta (Linnaeus, 1758)
- Chelonia mydas (Linnaeus, 1758)
- Lepidochelys olivacea (Eschscholtz, 1829)

=== Dermochelyidae ===
- Dermochelys coriacea (Vandelli, 1761)

=== Pelomedusidae ===
- Pelusios castaneus (Schweigger, 1812)
- Pelusios gabonensis (Duméril, 1856)
- Pelusios niger (Duméril & Bibron, 1835)

=== Testudinidae ===
- Kinixys erosa (Schweigger, 1812)
- Kinixys homeana Bell, 1827

=== Trionychidae ===
- Cyclanorbis elegans (Gray, 1869)
- Cyclanorbis senegalensis (Duméril & Bibron, 1835)
- Trionyx triunguis (Forskål, 1775)

== See also ==
- List of chordate orders
- List of regional reptiles lists
