= Teita mabuya =

Teita mabuya may refer to:

- Trachylepis keroanensis
- Trachylepis perrotetii, otherwise known as African red-sided skink

== See also ==
- Skink
