= Hemidactylus ituriensis =

Conservation status
- Least Concern (IUCN 3.1)

Scientific classification
- Kingdom: Animalia
- Phylum: Chordata
- Class: Reptilia
- Order: Squamata
- Suborder: Gekkota
- Family: Gekkonidae
- Genus: Hemidactylus
- Species: H. ituriensis

Binomial name
- Hemidactylus ituriensis Schmidt, 1919

Synonyms
- Hemidactylus fasciatus ituriensis – Loveridge, 1947

Species of lizard

Hemidactylus ituriensis (common name Ituri leaf-toed gecko) is a species of gecko. As currently known, it is endemic to northeastern Democratic Republic of Congo, although its true range probably extends eastwards to Uganda and Kenya. It belongs to the "Hemidactylus fasciatus species group".

Hemidactylus ituriensis can grow to 89 mm (3.5 in) in snout–vent length and about 162 mm (6.4 in) in total length. It is locally common in tropical moist forest at elevations above 1,100 m (3,600 ft).
