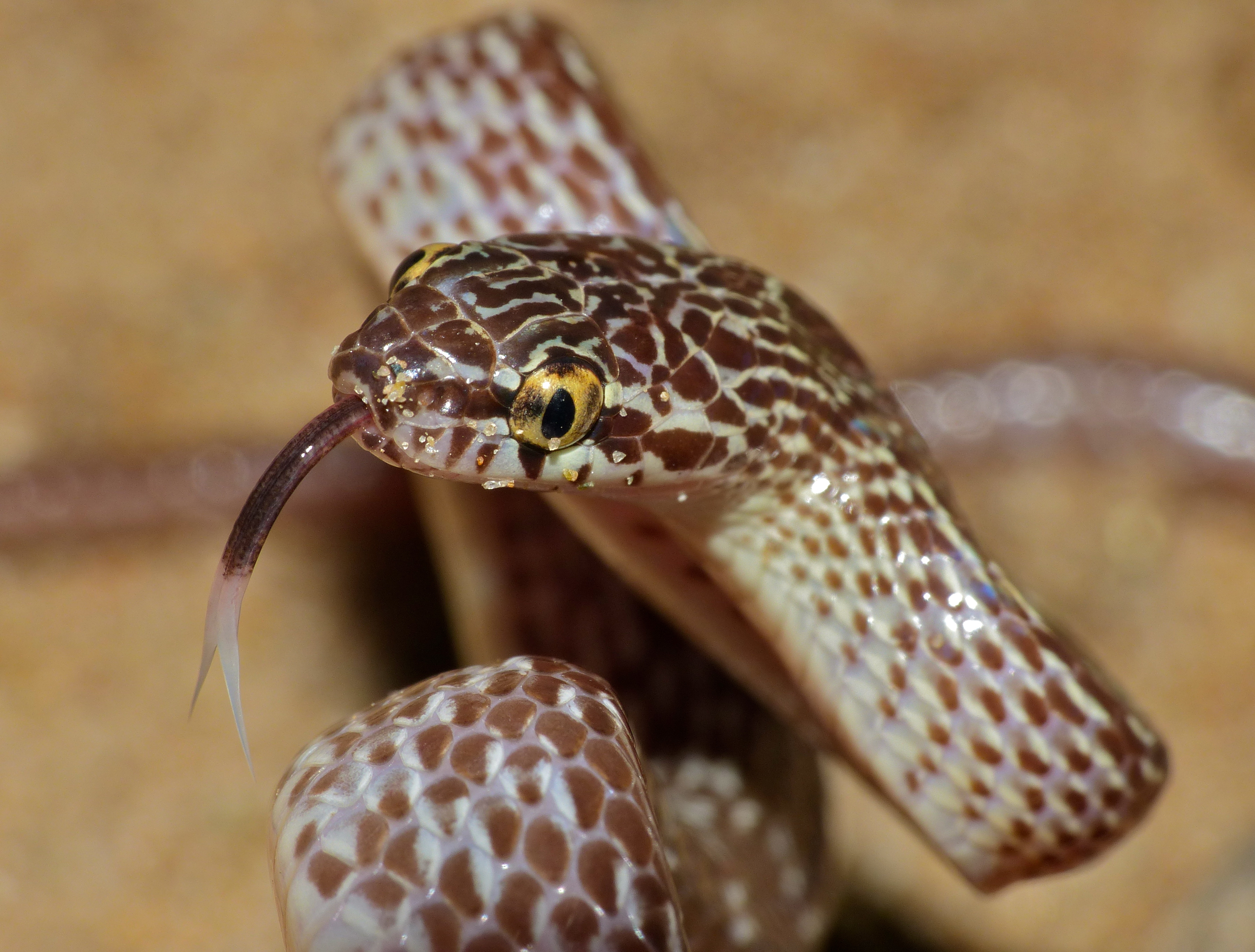

Conservation status
- Least Concern (IUCN 3.1)

Scientific classification
- Kingdom: Animalia
- Phylum: Chordata
- Class: Reptilia
- Order: Squamata
- Suborder: Serpentes
- Family: Colubridae
- Genus: Dipsadoboa
- Species: D. aulica

Binomial name
- Dipsadoboa aulica (Günther, 1864)

Synonyms
- Chamaetortus aulicus Günther, 1864; Dipsadoboa aulica — Rasmussen, 1989

= Dipsadoboa aulica =

Species of snake

Dipsadoboa aulica, commonly known as the marbled tree snake, is a species of snake in the family Colubridae. The species is endemic to Africa, and is mildly venomous to humans.

== Geographic range ==
D. aulica is found in Eswatini, Malawi, Mozambique, Somalia, South Africa, Tanzania, and Zimbabwe.

== Description ==
D. aulica is a slender-bodied snake. Males may attain a snout-to-vent length (SVL) of 66 cm (26 in). Females are slightly smaller, growing to 63 cm (25 in) SVL. The smooth dorsal scales are arranged in 17 rows at midbody.

== Behaviour ==
D. aulicus, is nocturnal and arboreal, hiding during the day in tree cavities or under bark.

== Diet ==
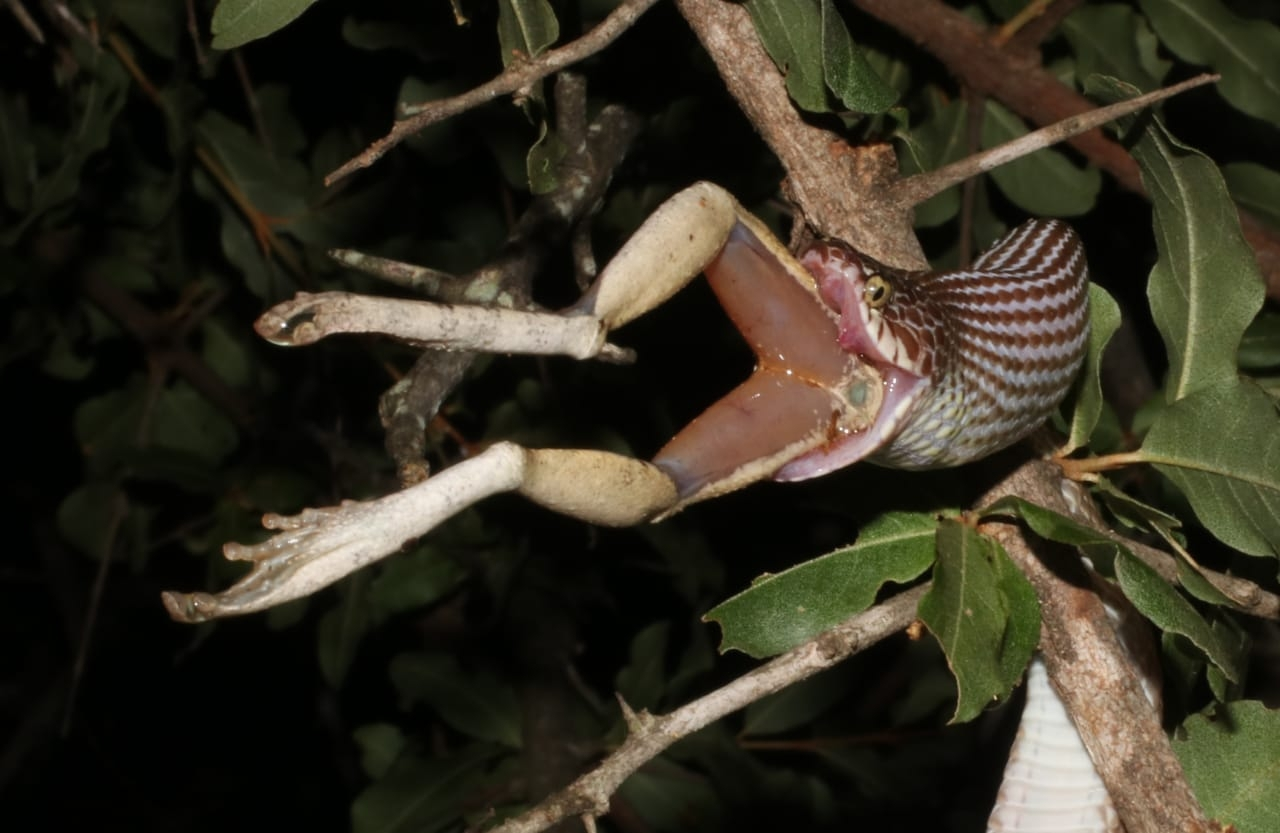
Feeding on a grey-foam nest tree frog, in South Africa

D. aulica preys primarily upon tree frogs and geckos, but will also eat toads, skinks, and small rodents.

== Reproduction ==
D. aulica, like all species in the genus Dipsadoboa, is oviparous. In midsummer sexually mature females lay 7-8 eggs. The eggs measure on average 25.5 x 11.5 mm (about 1 x 0.5 inch). Hatchlings measure on average 18 cm (about 7 inches) in total length (including tail).
