= Meizodon krameri =

Conservation status
- Data Deficient (IUCN 3.1)

Scientific classification
- Kingdom: Animalia
- Phylum: Chordata
- Class: Reptilia
- Order: Squamata
- Suborder: Serpentes
- Family: Colubridae
- Genus: Meizodon
- Species: M. krameri

Binomial name
- Meizodon krameri Schätti, 1985

Species of snake

Meizodon krameri, also known commonly as the Tana Delta smooth snake, is a species of snake in the subfamily Colubrinae of the family Colubridae. The species is endemic to Kenya.

== Etymology ==
The specific name, krameri, is in honor of Swiss herpetologist Eugen Kramer.

== Description ==
M. krameri may attain a total length (including tail) of 50 cm (20 in). The pupil of the eye is round. The dorsal scales are smooth and are arranged in 19 rows at midbody. Each dorsal scale has one apical pit. The ventrals number 166–176, which is fewer than other species in its genus. The anal plate is divided. The subcaudals number 68–69 and are also divided. The maxillary teeth number 26, which is more than other species in the genus. Dorsally, M. krameri is uniformly olive-brown. The labials are lighter, as are the centers of the ventrals.

== Natural history ==
Nothing is known about the natural history of M. krameri because it was described in 1985 from two preserved specimens which had been collected in 1934. No additional specimens have been collected or photographed. It may be terrestrial, diurnal, and oviparous like its congeners.
