= Dipsadoboa werneri =

Conservation status
- Near Threatened (IUCN 3.1)

Scientific classification
- Kingdom: Animalia
- Phylum: Chordata
- Class: Reptilia
- Order: Squamata
- Suborder: Serpentes
- Family: Colubridae
- Genus: Dipsadoboa
- Species: D. werneri

Binomial name
- Dipsadoboa werneri (Boulenger, 1897)

Species of snake

Dipsadoboa werneri, Werner's green tree snake, is a species of non-venomous snake in the family Colubridae. The species is found in Tanzania.

== Diet ==
The diet of Werner's green tree snakes include Usambara two-horned chameleons.
