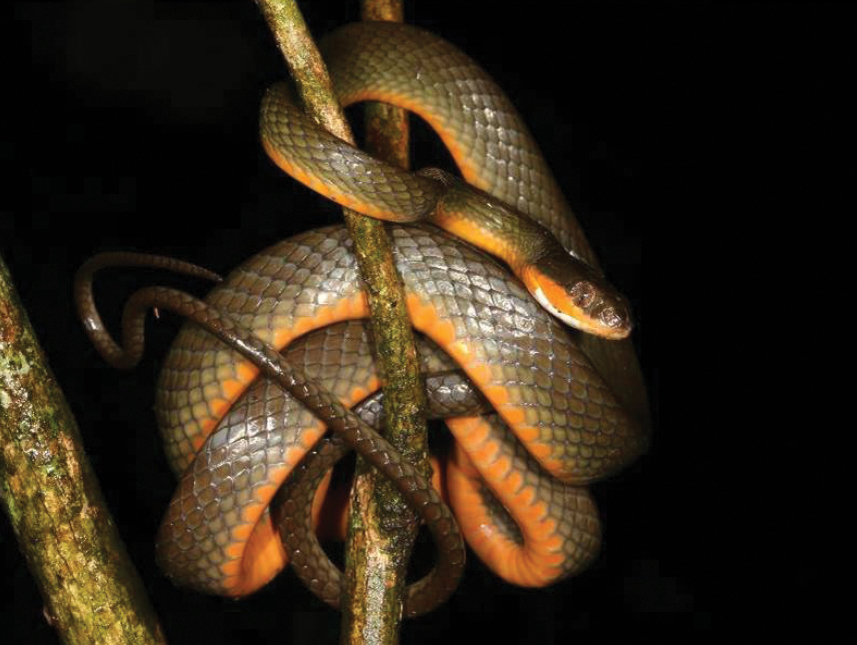

Conservation status
- Least Concern (IUCN 3.1)

Scientific classification
- Kingdom: Animalia
- Phylum: Chordata
- Class: Reptilia
- Order: Squamata
- Suborder: Serpentes
- Family: Colubridae
- Genus: Dipsadoboa
- Species: D. shrevei

Binomial name
- Dipsadoboa shrevei (Loveridge, 1932)

= Dipsadoboa shrevei =

Species of snake

Dipsadoboa shrevei, Shreve's tree snake, is a species of non-venomous snake in the family Colubridae. The species is found in Angola, the Democratic Republic of the Congo, Republic of the Congo, Zambia, Burundi, and Rwanda.
