= Dipsadoboa weileri =

Conservation status
- Least Concern (IUCN 3.1)

Scientific classification
- Kingdom: Animalia
- Phylum: Chordata
- Class: Reptilia
- Order: Squamata
- Suborder: Serpentes
- Family: Colubridae
- Genus: Dipsadoboa
- Species: D. weileri

Binomial name
- Dipsadoboa weileri (Lindholm, 1905)

Species of snake

Dipsadoboa weileri, the black-tailed tree snake, is a species of non-venomous snake in the family Colubridae. The species is found in Togo, Cameroon, Central African Republic, South Sudan, Equatorial Guinea, Gabon, Democratic Republic of the Congo, Rwanda, and Uganda.
