= Dipsadoboa kageleri =

Scientific classification
- Kingdom: Animalia
- Phylum: Chordata
- Class: Reptilia
- Order: Squamata
- Suborder: Serpentes
- Family: Colubridae
- Genus: Dipsadoboa
- Species: D. kageleri

Binomial name
- Dipsadoboa kageleri (Uthmöller, 1939)

Species of snake

Dipsadoboa kageleri, Kageler's tree snake, is a species of non-venomous snake in the family Colubridae. The species is found in Tanzania.
