= Dipsadoboa montisilva =

Conservation status
- Near Threatened (IUCN 3.1)

Scientific classification
- Kingdom: Animalia
- Phylum: Chordata
- Class: Reptilia
- Order: Squamata
- Suborder: Serpentes
- Family: Colubridae
- Genus: Dipsadoboa
- Species: D. montisilva

Binomial name
- Dipsadoboa montisilva Branch, Conradie, & Tolley, 2019

Species of snake

Dipsadoboa montisilva, the montane forest tree snake, is a species of non-venomous snake in the family Colubridae. The species is found in Mozambique.
