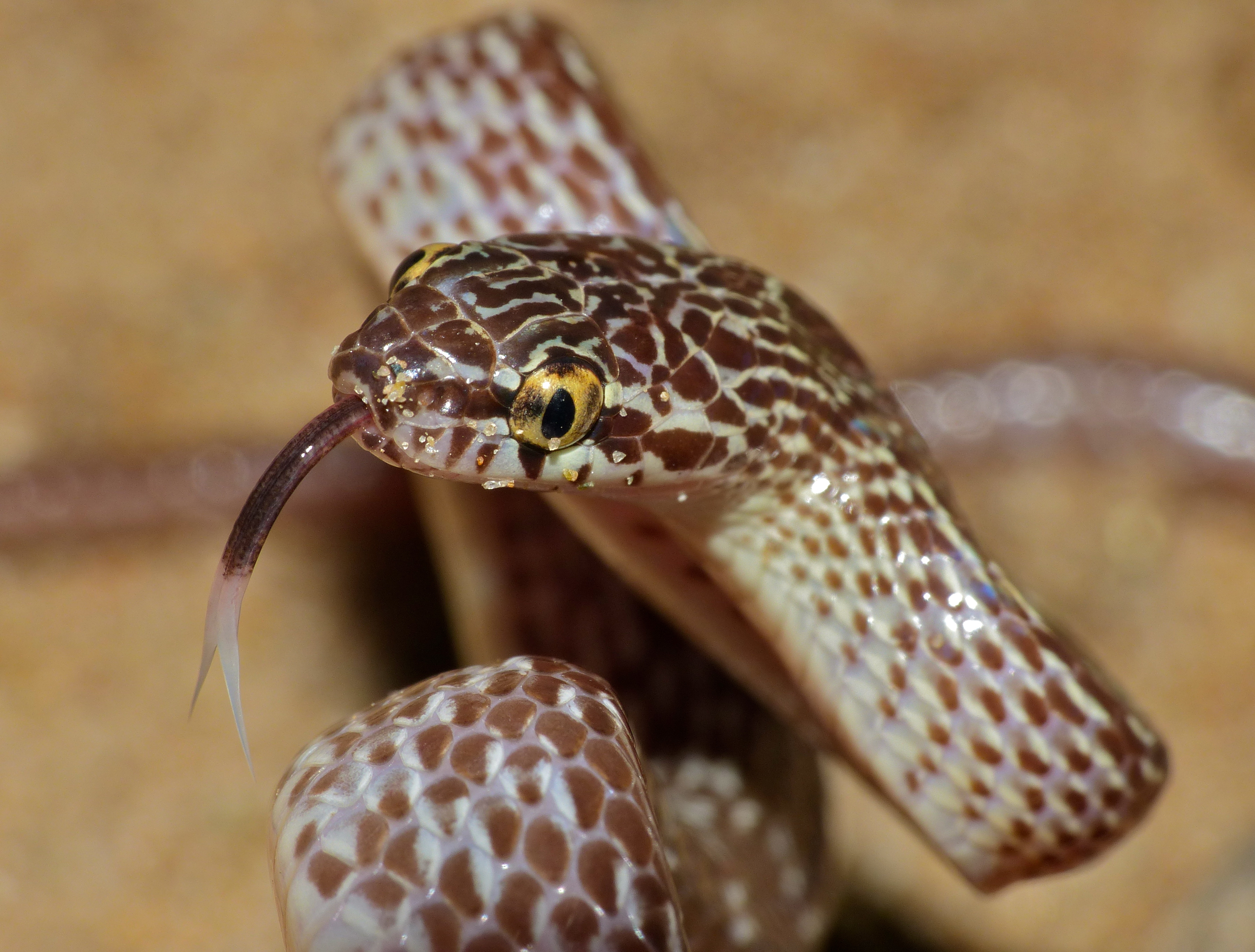
- Dipsadoboa aulica

Scientific classification
- Kingdom: Animalia
- Phylum: Chordata
- Class: Reptilia
- Order: Squamata
- Suborder: Serpentes
- Family: Colubridae
- Subfamily: Colubrinae
- Genus: Dipsadoboa; Günther, 1858

= Dipsadoboa =

Genus of snakes

Dipsadoboa is a genus of snakes in the family Colubridae.

== Geographic range ==
The genus Dipsadoboa is endemic to Africa.

== Species ==
The following 12 species are recognized as being valid.

- Dipsadoboa aulica (Günther, 1864) - marbled tree snake
- Dipsadoboa brevirostris (Sternfeld, 1908)
- Dipsadoboa duchesnii (Boulenger, 1901)
- Dipsadoboa flavida (Broadley & R. Stevens, 1971) - cross-barred tree snake
- Dipsadoboa kageleri (Uthmöller, 1939) - Kageler’s tree snake
- Dipsadoboa montisilva Branch, Conradie, & Tolley, 2019 - montane forest tree snake
- Dipsadoboa shrevei (Loveridge, 1932) - Shreve's tree snake
- Dipsadoboa underwoodi Rasmussen, 1993
- Dipsadoboa unicolor Günther, 1858 - Günther's green tree snake
- Dipsadoboa viridis (W. Peters, 1869) - Laurent’s green tree snake
- Dipsadoboa weileri (Lindholm, 1905) - black-tailed tree snake
- Dipsadoboa werneri (Boulenger, 1897) - Werner's green tree snake

Nota bene: A binomial authority in parentheses indicates that the species was originally described in a genus other than Dipsadoboa.
