= Dipsadoboa flavida =

Conservation status
- Least Concern (IUCN 3.1)

Scientific classification
- Kingdom: Animalia
- Phylum: Chordata
- Class: Reptilia
- Order: Squamata
- Suborder: Serpentes
- Family: Colubridae
- Genus: Dipsadoboa
- Species: D. flavida

Binomial name
- Dipsadoboa flavida (Broadley & R. Stevens, 1971)

Species of snake

Dipsadoboa flavida, the cross-barred tree snake, is a species of non-venomous snake in the family Colubridae. The species is found in Malawi, Somalia, Kenya, Tanzania, and Mozambique.
