= Meizodon plumbiceps =

Conservation status
- Least Concern (IUCN 3.1)

Scientific classification
- Kingdom: Animalia
- Phylum: Chordata
- Class: Reptilia
- Order: Squamata
- Suborder: Serpentes
- Family: Colubridae
- Genus: Meizodon
- Species: M. plumbiceps

Binomial name
- Meizodon plumbiceps (Boettger, 1893)

Species of snake

Meizodon plumbiceps, the black-headed smooth snake, is a species of snakes in the subfamily Colubrinae. It is found in Africa and the Arabian peninsula.
