= Hemidactylus kyaboboensis =

Scientific classification
- Kingdom: Animalia
- Phylum: Chordata
- Class: Reptilia
- Order: Squamata
- Suborder: Gekkota
- Family: Gekkonidae
- Genus: Hemidactylus
- Species: H. kyaboboensis

Binomial name
- Hemidactylus kyaboboensis Wagner, Leaché & Fujita, 2014

Synonyms
- Hemidactylus kyaboboensis Leaché & Fujita, 2010 — nomen nudum

Species of lizard

Hemidactylus kyaboboensis is a species of forest geckos from Ghana and Togo. Its type locality is Kyabobo National Park, to which its specific name refers. It is the sister species of Hemidactylus fasciatus.

== Description ==
Hemidactylus kyaboboensis grow to a maximum snout–vent length of 80 mm (3.1 in) and a maximum total length of 160 mm (6.3 in). The head is broad. The body has indistinct dark crossbands and more prominent whitish stripes and dots. There is a broad crossband on the neck that reaches the lower tip of the ear hole.

== Habitat and distribution ==
Hemidactylus kyaboboensis have been collected from moist, semi-deciduous rainforests in the Togo Hills of eastern Ghana and Missahöhe in western Togo. These rainforests are habitat islands within the more arid Dahomey Gap.
