= Meizodon =

Scientific classification
- Kingdom: Animalia
- Phylum: Chordata
- Class: Reptilia
- Order: Squamata
- Suborder: Serpentes
- Family: Colubridae
- Subfamily: Colubrinae
- Genus: Meizodon; Fischer, 1856

Species
- Five recognized species, see article.

Genus of snakes

Meizodon is a genus of snakes in the subfamily Colubrinae of the family Colubridae. The genus Meizodon contains five species, all of which are poorly known and are endemic to Sub-Saharan Africa.

== Species list ==
- Meizodon coronatus (Schlegel, 1837) – western crowned snake
- Meizodon krameri Schätti, 1985 – Tana Delta smooth snake
- Meizodon plumbiceps (Boettger, 1893) – black-headed smooth snake
- Meizodon regularis Fischer, 1856 – eastern crowned smooth snake
- Meizodon semiornatus (W. Peters, 1854) – semiornate smooth snake, semiornate snake

Nota bene: A binomial authority in parentheses indicates that the species was originally described in a genus other than Meizodon.

== Etymology ==
The specific name, krameri, is in honor of Swiss herpetologist Eugen Kramer (1921–2004).
