= Meizodon semiornatus =

Conservation status
- Least Concern (IUCN 3.1)

Scientific classification
- Kingdom: Animalia
- Phylum: Chordata
- Class: Reptilia
- Order: Squamata
- Suborder: Serpentes
- Family: Colubridae
- Genus: Meizodon
- Species: M. semiornatus

Binomial name
- Meizodon semiornatus (W. Peters, 1854)

Species of snake

Meizodon semiornatus, the semiornate smooth snake or semiornate snake, is a species of snake in the subfamily Colubrinae. It is found in Africa.
