= Dipsadoboa duchesnii =

Conservation status
- Least Concern (IUCN 3.1)

Scientific classification
- Kingdom: Animalia
- Phylum: Chordata
- Class: Reptilia
- Order: Squamata
- Suborder: Serpentes
- Family: Colubridae
- Genus: Dipsadoboa
- Species: D. duchesnii

Binomial name
- Dipsadoboa duchesnii (Boulenger, 1901)

Species of snake

Dipsadoboa duchesnii is a species of non-venomous snake in the family Colubridae. The species is found in regions of Central Africa, including Democratic Republic of the Congo, Republic of the Congo, Gabon, Equatorial Guinea, Central African Republic, Nigeria, and Cameroon.
