= Rasmussen's gecko =

Scientific classification
- Kingdom: Animalia
- Phylum: Chordata
- Class: Reptilia
- Order: Squamata
- Suborder: Gekkota
- Family: Gekkonidae
- Genus: Urocotyledon
- Species: U. rasmusseni

Binomial name
- Urocotyledon rasmusseni Bauer & Menegon, 2006

Species of lizard

Rasmussen's gecko (Urocotyledon rasmusseni) is a species of lizard in the family Gekkonidae. The species is endemic to the Udzungwa Mountains in Tanzania.

== Etymology ==
The specific name, rasmusseni, is in honor of Danish herpetologist Jens Bødtker Rasmussen.

== Reproduction ==
U. rasmusseni is oviparous.
