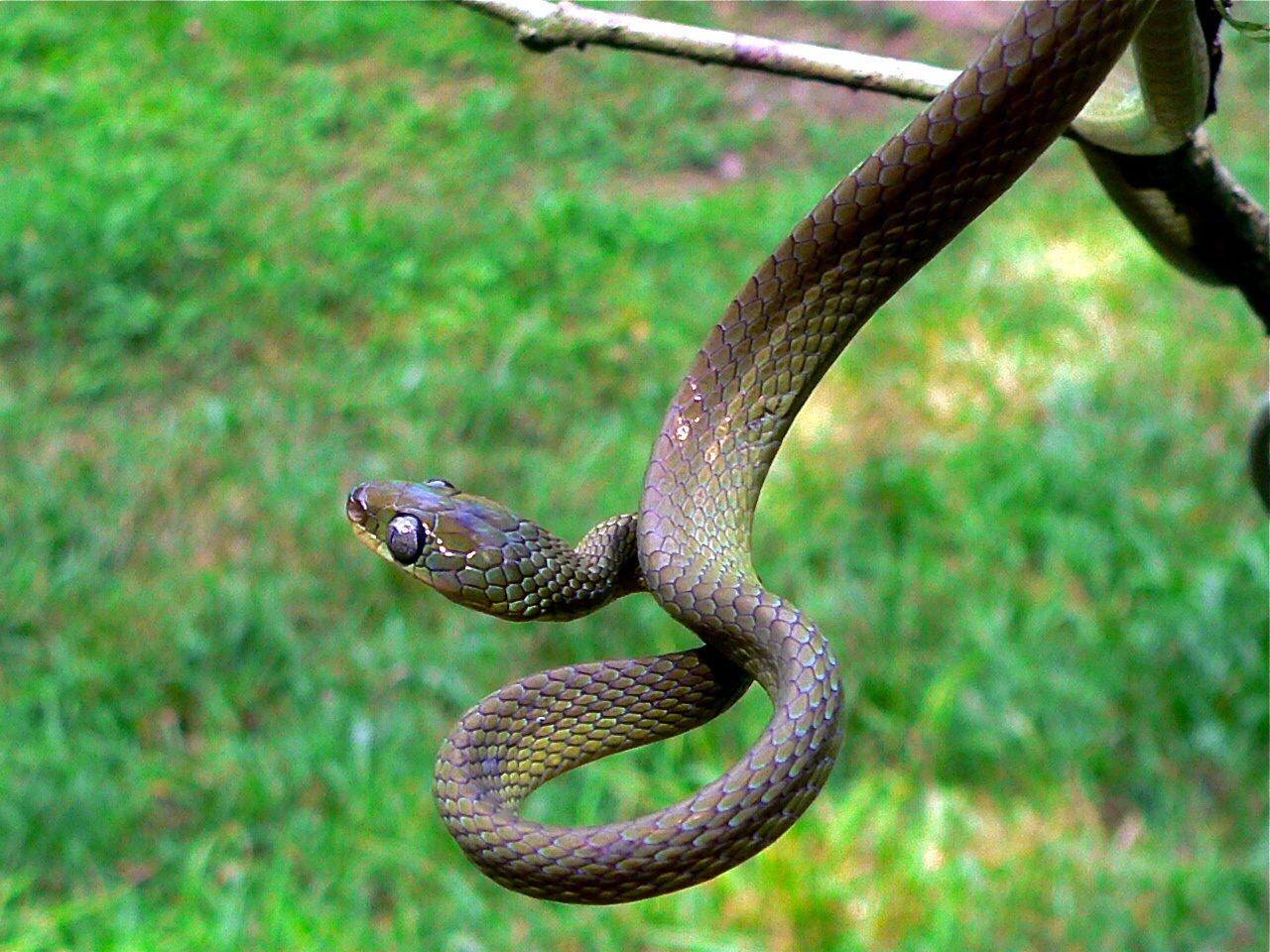

Conservation status
- Least Concern (IUCN 3.1)

Scientific classification
- Kingdom: Animalia
- Phylum: Chordata
- Class: Reptilia
- Order: Squamata
- Suborder: Serpentes
- Family: Colubridae
- Genus: Dipsadoboa
- Species: D. viridis

Binomial name
- Dipsadoboa viridis (Peters, 1869)

= Dipsadoboa viridis =

Species of snake

Dipsadoboa viridis, Laurent's green tree snake, is a species of non-venomous snake in the family Colubridae. The species is found in Cameroon through the Democratic Republic of the Congo, Gabon, Central African Republic, Togo, Ivory Coast, Ghana, Nigeria, and Rwanda.
