= Jens B. Rasmussen =

Danish herpetologist (1947–2005)

- Born: April 16, 1947; Frederiksberg, Copenhagen, Denmark
- Died: May 3, 2005 (aged 58)
- Spouse: Heidi Aune
- Children: 1

Jens Bødtker Rasmussen was a Danish herpetologist and museum curator. He is known for his contributions to the knowledge of the snakes of Africa, especially regarding their biogeography and phylogeny. He died in 2005 after a short period of illness.

== Life ==
As a student, Rasmussen established connections with the head of the vertebrate section of the University of Copenhagen Zoological Museum, Frits Wimpffen Bræstrup. He received his cand.mag. in 1975 and licentiate in 1977. Upon receiving his licentiate, he was made Curator of Herpetology at that museum, succeeding Bræstrup in this role. As curator, he undertook several expeditions to Africa, including South Sudan, Tanzania, and Democratic Republic of the Congo, focusing primarily on collections of African snakes, which he brought back to expand the collections at the Zoological Museum. Close personal connections with other notable herpetologists of the late 20th century, including Wolfgang Böhme, Garth Underwood, and Malcolm Largen, helped him establish a strong network and gather the massive dataset he was assembling for an atlas of African snakes. His work resulted in numerous significant scientific advances, including an atlas of the snakes of Ethiopia. He achieved the Danish higher doctorate in 1994, through a compendium of his publications on Dispadoboa.

== Honorifics ==
Three reptile species have been named after Jens B. Rasmussen:

- Urocotyledon rasmusseni Bauer & Menegon, 2006
- Varanus rasmusseni Koch, Gaulke & Böhme, 2010
- Causus rasmusseni Broadley, 2014
