= Dipsadoboa unicolor =

Conservation status
- Least Concern (IUCN 3.1)

Scientific classification
- Kingdom: Animalia
- Phylum: Chordata
- Class: Reptilia
- Order: Squamata
- Suborder: Serpentes
- Family: Colubridae
- Genus: Dipsadoboa
- Species: D. unicolor

Binomial name
- Dipsadoboa unicolor Günther, 1858

Species of snake

Dipsadoboa unicolor, Günther's green tree snake, is a species of non-venomous snake in the family Colubridae. The species is found in Uganda, Rwanda, Burundi, the Democratic Republic of the Congo, the Republic of the Congo, Central African Republic, Cameroon, Nigeria, Togo, Ghana, Ivory Coast, Guinea, Liberia, Tanzania, South Sudan, and Equatorial Guinea.
