= Dipsadoboa underwoodi =

Conservation status
- Least Concern (IUCN 3.1)

Scientific classification
- Kingdom: Animalia
- Phylum: Chordata
- Class: Reptilia
- Order: Squamata
- Suborder: Serpentes
- Family: Colubridae
- Genus: Dipsadoboa
- Species: D. underwoodi

Binomial name
- Dipsadoboa underwoodi Rasmussen, 1993

Species of snake

Dipsadoboa underwoodi is a species of non-venomous snake in the family Colubridae. The species is found in Cameroon, Gabon, Togo, Guinea, Sierra Leone, Liberia, Ivory Coast, Ghana, and Equatorial Guinea.
