= Meizodon coronatus =

Conservation status
- Least Concern (IUCN 3.1)

Scientific classification
- Kingdom: Animalia
- Phylum: Chordata
- Class: Reptilia
- Order: Squamata
- Suborder: Serpentes
- Family: Colubridae
- Genus: Meizodon
- Species: M. coronatus

Binomial name
- Meizodon coronatus (Schlegel, 1837)

Species of snake

Meizodon coronatus, the western crowned snake, is a species of snakes in the subfamily Colubrinae. It is found in Africa.
