= Meizodon regularis =

Conservation status
- Least Concern (IUCN 3.1)

Scientific classification
- Kingdom: Animalia
- Phylum: Chordata
- Class: Reptilia
- Order: Squamata
- Suborder: Serpentes
- Family: Colubridae
- Genus: Meizodon
- Species: M. regularis

Binomial name
- Meizodon regularis Fischer, 1856

Synonyms
- Coronella (Mizodon [sic]) regularis Fischer, 1883: 15; Coronella coronata Schmidt, 1923: 87 (fide Schätti, 1985); Coronella elegans Jan, G.A. 1863; Meizodon regularis Broadley, 1998; Meizodon regularis Chirio & Ineich, 2006

Species of snake

Meizodon regularis, the eastern crowned smooth snake, is a species of snakes in the subfamily Colubrinae. It is found in Africa.
