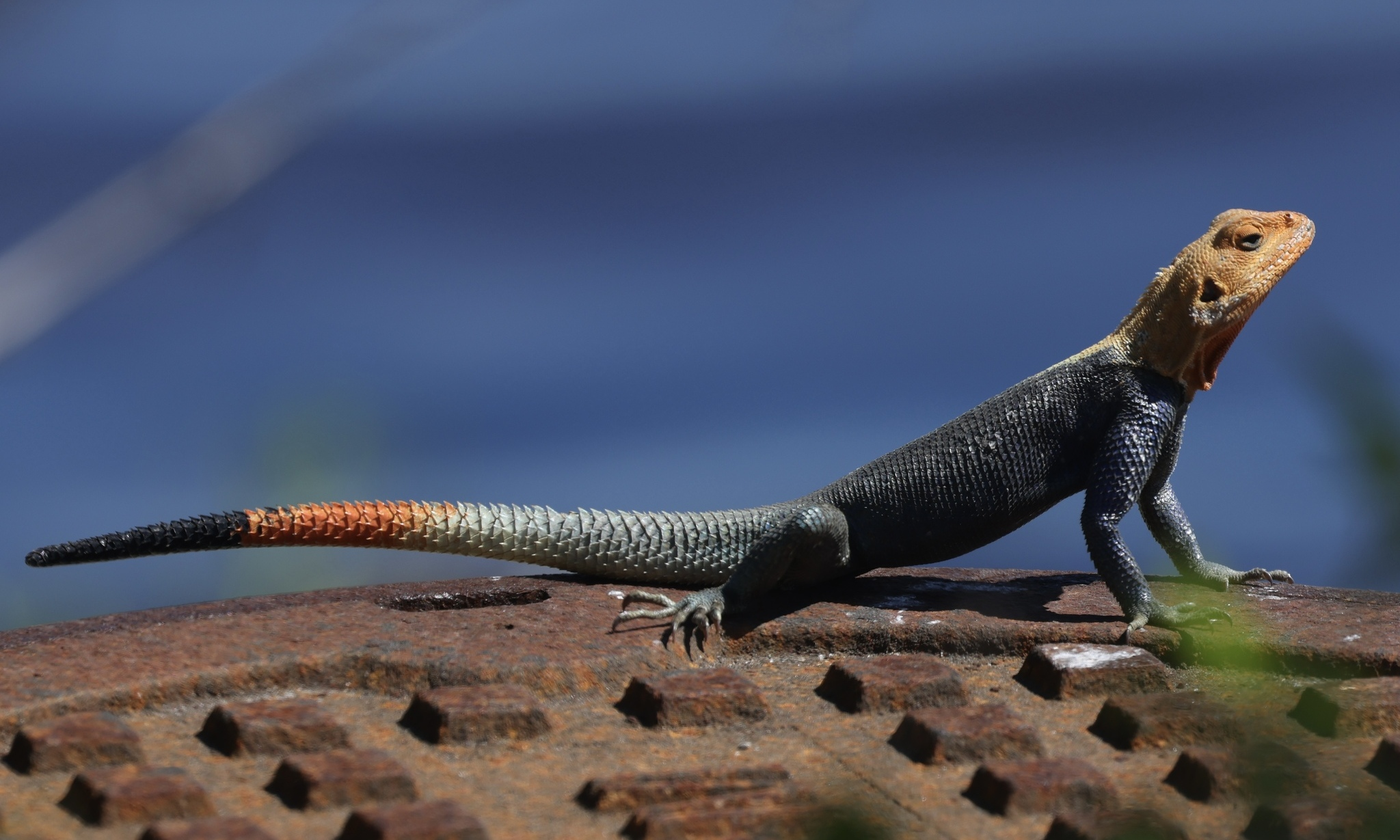

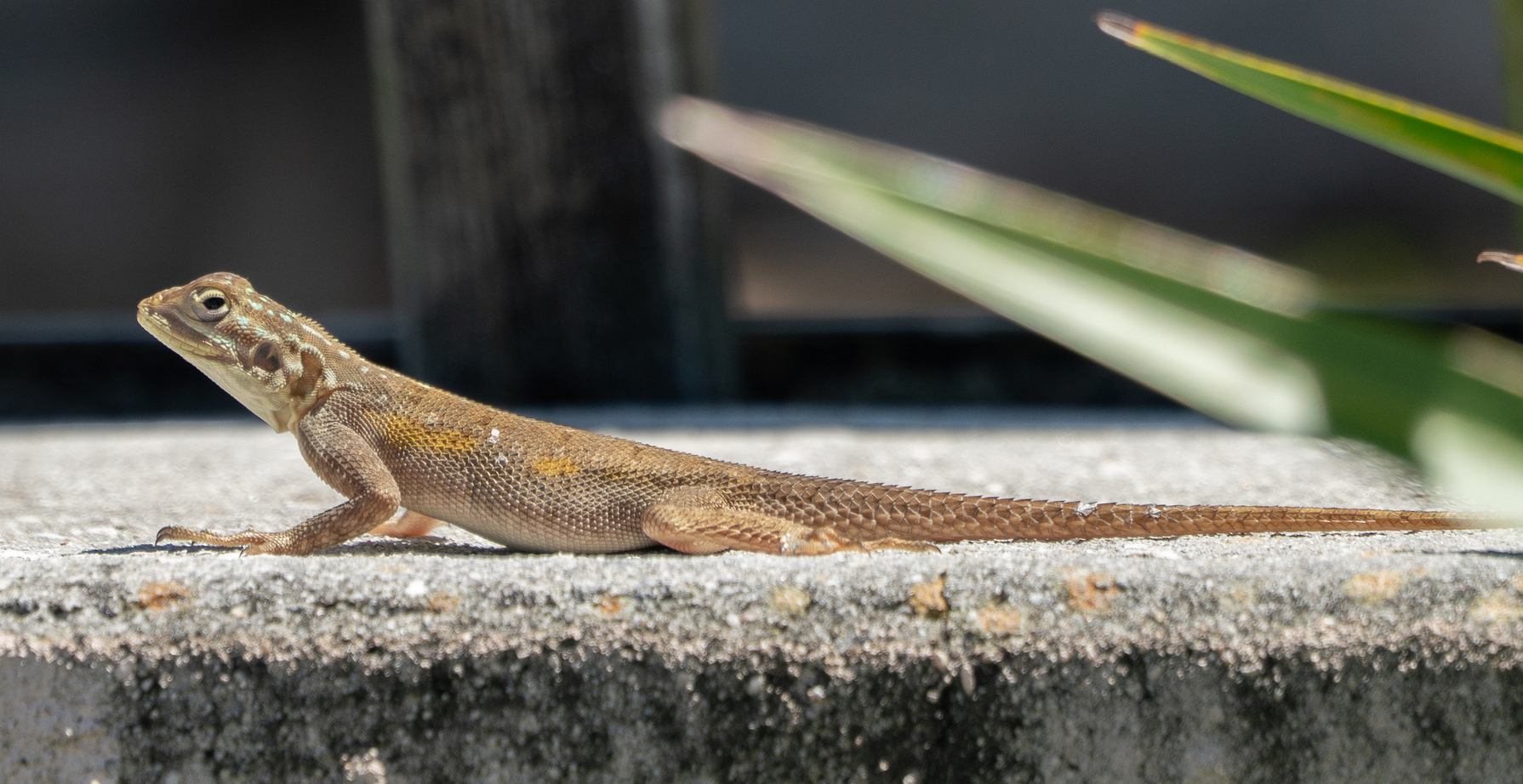
- Male (top) and female (bottom)

Conservation status
- Least Concern (IUCN 3.1)

Scientific classification
- Kingdom: Animalia
- Phylum: Chordata
- Class: Reptilia
- Order: Squamata
- Suborder: Iguania
- Family: Agamidae
- Genus: Agama
- Species: A. picticauda

Binomial name
- Agama picticauda W. Peters, 1877

= Agama picticauda =

Species of lizard

Agama picticauda, also known commonly as Peters's rock agama and the African redhead agama, is a species of lizard in the family Agamidae. The species is native to West Africa.

== Geographic range ==
A. picticauda occurs in West Africa, from Mauritania in the west to Nigeria in the east. 10

=== Introduced range ===
A. picticauda was first introduced to Florida in 1976 through the pet trade. First colonizing Homestead and other areas in Miami-Dade County. Since then it has spread elsewhere in South Florida including the Keys. Introduced populations also exist in La Réunion and the Comoros, with single specimen(s) reported from Cape Verde, Madeira, and Madagascar.

Sightings in South Florida rapidly increased at the end of 2020, indicating that the population has recently also increased rapidly. Further sightings in 2024, as suggested by the Florida Fish and Wildlife Conservation Commission that the population has expanded northward into Central Florida as far north as Volusia County.

An awareness letter, drafted by numerous Caribbean-based biologists and conservationists highlights the threat to reptiles across the Caribbean Lesser Antilles if A. picticauda becomes established there. In 2022 and 2023, several individual specimens have been sighted on the British Virgin Islands as well as The Bahamas. In March 2025, a shipment that arrived on the island of Saint Barthélemy contained several agama individuals, all of which were captured soon after arrival.

A new study in 2024 from the University of Florida suggests that the invasive lizard found in over 20 counties may indirectly increase the risk of mosquito-borne diseases like West Nile virus. As Agama picticauda preys on the also invasive brown anole, it reduces the number of anoles available for mosquitoes to feed on. This could lead to mosquitoes seeking out humans for their blood meal, potentially increasing the spread of diseases.
