= Dipsadoboa brevirostris =

Conservation status
- Least Concern (IUCN 3.1)

Scientific classification
- Kingdom: Animalia
- Phylum: Chordata
- Class: Reptilia
- Order: Squamata
- Suborder: Serpentes
- Family: Colubridae
- Genus: Dipsadoboa
- Species: D. brevirostris

Binomial name
- Dipsadoboa brevirostris (Sternfeld, 1908)
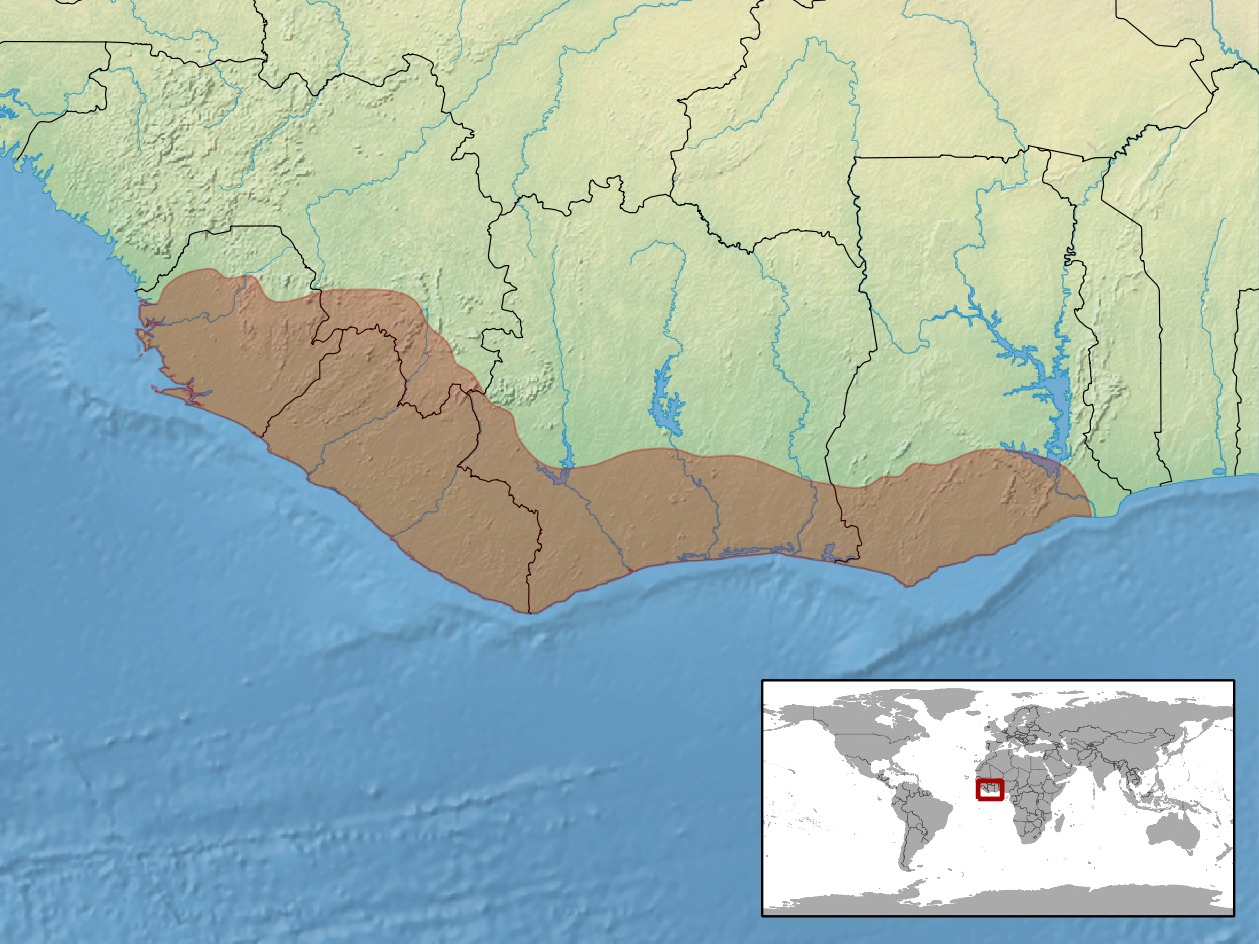

Species of snake

Dipsadoboa brevirostris is a species of non-venomous snake in the family Colubridae. The species is found in Guinea, Sierra Leone, Liberia, Ivory Coast, Ghana, Togo, Nigeria, and Cameroon.
