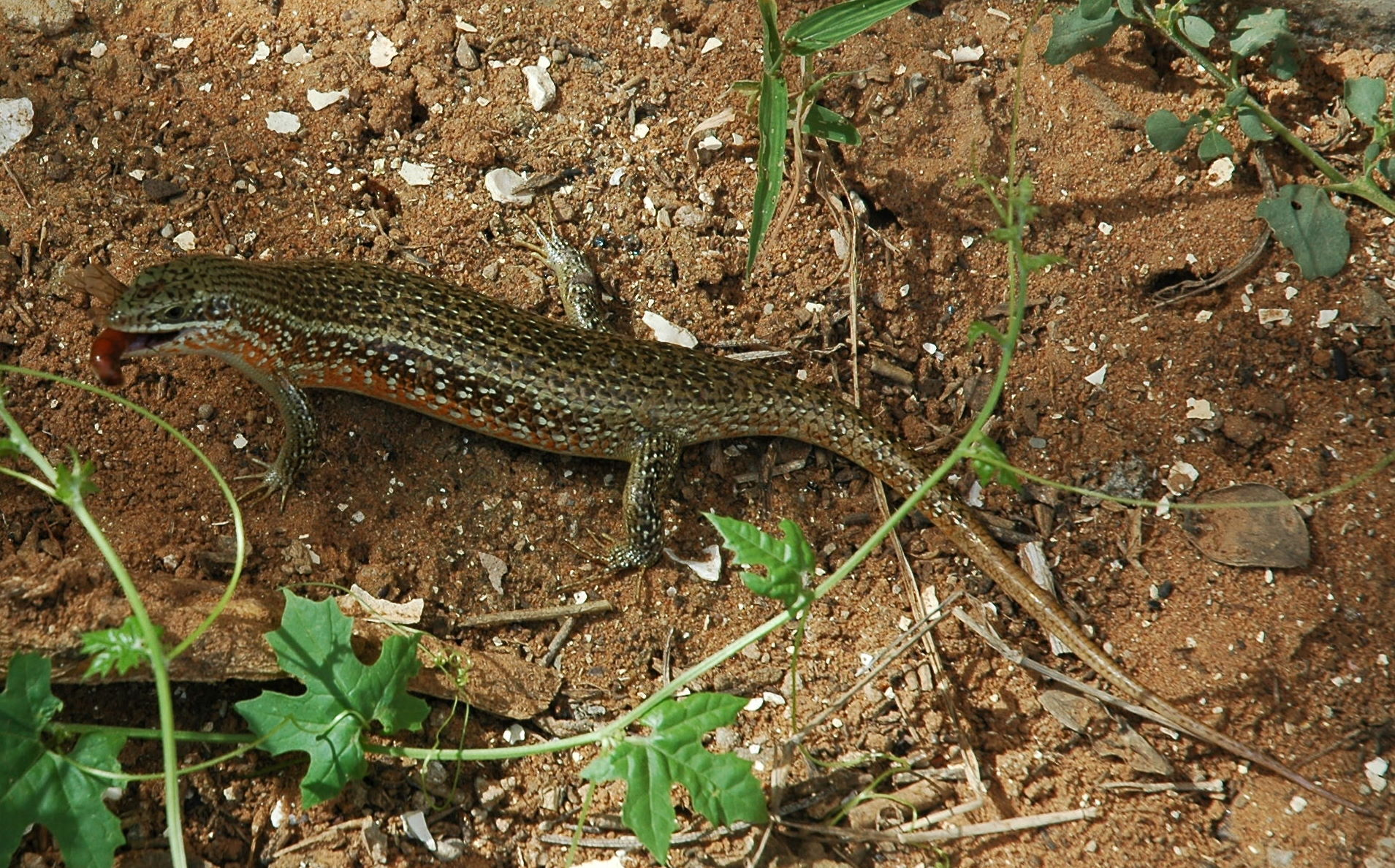

Conservation status
- Least Concern (IUCN 3.1)

Scientific classification
- Kingdom: Animalia
- Phylum: Chordata
- Class: Reptilia
- Order: Squamata
- Family: Scincidae
- Genus: Trachylepis
- Species: T. perrotetii

Binomial name
- Trachylepis perrotetii (A.M.C. Duméril & Bibron, 1839)

Synonyms
- Euprepes perrotetii A.M.C. Duméril & Bibron, 1839; Mabuia perrotetii (A.M.C. Duméril & Bibron, 1839); Mabuya perrotetii (A.M.C. Duméril & Bibron, 1839); Euprepis perrotetii (A.M.C. Duméril & Bibron, 1839); Euprepes (Euprepis) pleurostictus W. Peters, 1864; Mabuia mongallensis F. Werner, 1908; Mabuia breviparietalis Chabanaud, 1917

= Trachylepis perrotetii =

Species of lizard

Trachylepis perrotetii, also known commonly as the African red-sided skink, the red-sided skink, and the Teita mabuya, is a species of lizard in the subfamily Mabuyinae of the family Scincidae. The species is native to Sub-Saharan West Africa. There are two recognized subspecies.

== Etymology ==
The specific name, perrotetii, is in honor of French naturalist George Samuel Perrottet.

== Geographic range ==
Trachylepis perrotetii is found in Benin, Burkina Faso, Cameroon, Central African Republic, Chad, Democratic Republic of the Congo, The Gambia, Ghana, Guinea, Guinea-Bissau, Ivory Coast, Liberia, Mali, Mauritania, Niger, Nigeria, Senegal, Sierra Leone, Sudan, Togo, and Uganda.

== Habitat ==
The preferred natural habitat of Trachylepis perrotetii is savanna, at elevations from near sea level to 1,900 m (6,200 ft).

== Behavior ==
Trachylepis perrotetii is diurnal and terrestrial. It digs short burrows under bushes for shelter.

== Reproduction ==
Trachylepis perrotetii is oviparous.

== Subspecies ==
Two subspecies are recognized as being valid, including the nominotypical subspecies.

- Trachylepis perrotetii perrotetii (A.M.C. Duméril & Bibron, 1839)
- Trachylepis perrotetii upembae (de Witte, 1953)
