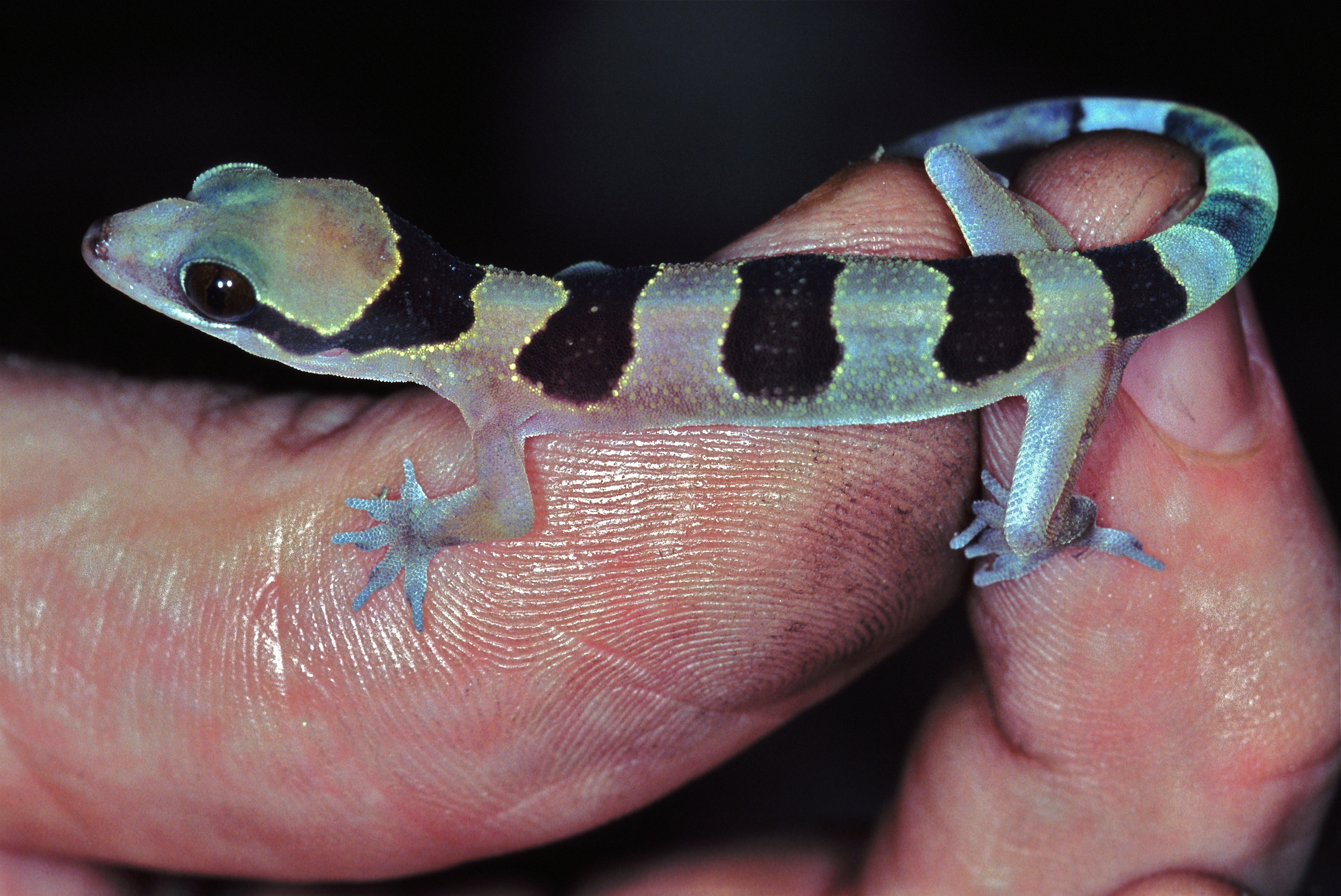

Conservation status
- Least Concern (IUCN 3.1)

Scientific classification
- Kingdom: Animalia
- Phylum: Chordata
- Class: Reptilia
- Order: Squamata
- Suborder: Gekkota
- Family: Gekkonidae
- Genus: Hemidactylus
- Species: H. fasciatus

Binomial name
- Hemidactylus fasciatus Gray, 1842

= Banded leaf-toed gecko =

Species of lizard

The banded leaf-toed gecko (Hemidactylus fasciatus) is a species of gecko. It is endemic to West Africa west of the Dahomey Gap, from southern Guinea to Togo.

Hemidactylus fasciatus is a fairly large gecko recognizable by the broad dark band between the eyes and the neck and by its pale upper lip. It can grow to 95 mm (3.7 in) in snout–vent length and about 172 mm (6.8 in) in total length. It is generally found in the forest where it hides during the day in tree stumps or rock crevices.
