= List of reptiles of Ghana =

This is a list of the reptile species recorded in Ghana. There are 154 reptile species in Ghana, of which one is critically endangered, one is endangered, two are vulnerable and two are near threatened. This list is derived from the Reptile Database which lists species of reptile and includes those reptiles that have recently been classified as extinct (since 1500 AD). The taxonomy and naming of the individual species is based on those currently used by the Reptile Database as of 20 September 2011 and supplemented by the common names and taxonomy from the IUCN where no Reptile Database article was available.

The following tags are used to highlight specific species' conservation status as assessed by the IUCN:

EX	Extinct	No reasonable doubt that the last individual has died.
EW	Extinct in the wild	Known only to survive in captivity or as a naturalized populations well outside its previous range.
CR	Critically endangered	The species is in imminent risk of extinction in the wild.
EN	Endangered	The species is facing an extremely high risk of extinction in the wild.
VU	Vulnerable	The species is facing a high risk of extinction in the wild.
NT	Near threatened	The species does not meet any of the criteria that would categorise it as risking extinction but it is likely to do so in the future.

== Order: Testudines (turtles) ==
- Family: Testudinidae (tortoises)
  - Genus: Kinixys
    - Bell's hinge-back tortoise, Kinixys belliana
    - Eroded hinge-back tortoise, Kinixys erosa
    - Home's hinge-back tortoise, Kinixys homeana VU
- Family: Cheloniidae (sea turtles)
  - Genus: Chelonia
    - Green turtle, Chelonia mydas
  - Genus: Eretmochelys
    - Hawksbill, Eretmochelys imbricata
  - Genus: Lepidochelys
    - Olive ridley, Lepidochelys olivacea
- Family: Dermochelyidae
  - Genus: Dermochelys
    - Leatherback sea turtle, Dermochelys coriacea CR
- Family: Pelomedusidae (Afro-American side-neck turtles)
  - Genus: Pelomedusidae
    - Helmeted turtle, Pelomedusa subrufa
  - Genus: Pelusios
    - Ivory Coast mud turtle, Pelusios cupulatta
    - African forest turtle, Pelusios gabonensis
    - West African black turtle, Pelusios niger
- Family: Trionychidae (soft-shell turtles)
  - Genus: Cyclanorbis
    - Nubian soft-shelled turtle, Cyclanorbis elegans NT
    - Senegal soft-shelled turtle, Cyclanorbis senegalensis NT

== Order: Squamata (snakes and lizards) ==
- Family: Agamidae (agamas)
  - Genus: Agama
    - Agama africana
    - Common agama, Agama agama
    - Doria's agama, Agama doriae
    - False agama, Agama paragama
    - Senegal agama, Agama sankaranica
    - Agama sylvana
- Family: Chamaeleonidae (chameleons)
  - Genus: Chamaeleo
    - Graceful chameleon, Chamaeleo gracilis
    - Senegal chameleon, Chamaeleo senegalensis
  - Genus: Trioceros
    - Crested chameleon, Trioceros cristatus
- Family: Gekkonidae (geckos)
  - Genus: Hemidactylus
    - Brook's house gecko, Hemidactylus angulatus
    - Nigerian leaf-toed gecko, Hemidactylus ansorgii
    - Spotted house gecko, Hemidactylus brookii
    - Banded leaf-toed gecko, Hemidactylus fasciatus
    - House gecko, Hemidactylus mabouia
    - Guinea leaf-toed gecko, Hemidactylus muriceus
  - Genus: Lygodactylus
    - Cameroon dwarf gecko, Lygodactylus conraui
    - Chevron-throated dwarf gecko, Lygodactylus gutturalis
    - Painted dwarf gecko, Lygodactylus picturatus
- Family: Eublepharidae (eyelid geckos)
  - Genus: Hemitheconyx
    - Fat-tail gecko, Hemitheconyx caudicinctus
- Family: Phyllodactylidae (leaf-toed geckos)
  - Genus: Ptyodactylus
    - Yellow fan-fingered gecko, Ptyodactylus hasselquistii
    - Ragazzi's fan-footed gecko, Ptyodactylus ragazzii
- Family: Gerrhosauridae (plated lizards)
  - Genus: Gerrhosaurus
    - Rough-scaled plated lizard, Gerrhosaurus major
- Family: Lacertidae (true lizards)
  - Genus: Acanthodactylus
    - Chabanaud's fringe-fingered lizard, Acanthodactylus boueti
    - Guinea fringe-fingered lizard, Acanthodactylus guineensis
  - Genus: Gastropholis
    - Cope's spinytail lizard, Gastropholis echinata
  - Genus: Holaspis
    - Saw-tail lizard, Holaspis guentheri
- Family: Scincidae (skinks)
  - Genus: Chalcides
    - Thierry's cylindrical skink, Chalcides thierryi
  - Genus: Cophoscincopus
    - Keeled water skink, Cophoscincopus durus
    - Cophoscincopus greeri
    - Cophoscincopus simulans
  - Genus: Lepidothyris
    - Fire skink, Lepidothyris fernandi
  - Genus: Lygosoma
    - Lygosoma guineensis
  - Genus: Mochlus
    - Mochlus brevicaudis
  - Genus: Panaspis
    - Togo lidless skink, Panaspis togoensis
  - Genus: Trachylepis
    - Senegal skink, Trachylepis affinis
    - Guinea skink, Trachylepis albilabris
    - Trachylepis buettneri
    - Speckle-lipped skink, Trachylepis maculilabris
    - Teita skink, Trachylepis perrotetii
    - Tropical skink, Trachylepis polytropis
    - African five-lined skink, Trachylepis quinquetaeniata
    - Rodenburg's skink Trachylepis rodenburgi
- Family: Varanidae (monitors)
  - Genus: Varanus
    - Savanna monitor, Varanus exanthematicus
    - Nile monitor, Varanus niloticus
- Family: Amphisbaenidae (worm lizards)
  - Genus: cynisca
    - Ghana worm lizard, sCynisca kraussi EN
    - Coast worm lizard, Cynisca leucura
    - Cynisca muelleri
    - Cynisca williamsi
- Family: Pythonidae (pythons)
  - Genus: Python
    - Ball python, Python regius
    - African rock python, Python sebae
- Family: Boidae (boas)
  - Genus: Calabaria
    - Calabar ground python, Calabaria reinhardtii
  - Genus: Eryx
    - Muller's sand boa, Eryx muelleri
- Family: Colubridae (colubrid snakes)
  - Genus: Afronatrix
    - African brown water snake, Afronatrix anoscopus
  - Genus: Bamanophis
    - Bamanophis dorri
  - Genus: Crotaphopeltis
    - Crotaphopeltis hippocrepis
    - White-lipped herald snake, Crotaphopeltis hotamboeia
  - Genus: Dasypeltis
    - Central African egg-eater, Dasypeltis fasciata
    - Common egg-eater, Dasypeltis scabra
  - Genus: Dipsadoboa
    - Dipsadoboa duchesnii
    - Gunther's green tree snake, Dipsadoboa unicolor
  - Genus: Grayia
    - Smith's African water snake, Grayia smithii
  - Genus: Hapsidophrys
    - Black-lined green snake, Hapsidophrys lineatus
    - Emerald snake, Hapsidophrys smaragdina
  - Genus: Meizodon
    - Western crowned smooth snake, Meizodon coronatus
  - Genus: Natriciteres
    - Collared marsh snake, Natriciteres fuliginoides
    - Olive marsh snake, Natriciteres olivacea
    - Variable marsh snake, Natriciteres variegata
  - Genus: Philothamnus
    - Emerald green snake, Philothamnus heterodermus
    - Slender green snake, Philothamnus heterolepidotus
    - Northern green bush snake, Philothamnus irregularis
    - Spotted bush snake, Philothamnus semivariegatus
  - Genus: Rhamnophis
    - Large-eyed green tree snake, Rhamnophis aethiopissa
  - Genus: Scaphiophis
    - African shovel-nosed snake, Scaphiophis albopunctatus
  - Genus: Telescopus
    - Variable cat snake, Telescopus variegatus
  - Genus: Thelotornis
    - Forest vine snake Thelotornis kirtlandii
  - Genus: Thrasops
    - Yellow-throated bold-eyed tree snake, Thrasops flavigularis
    - Western black tree snake, Thrasops occidentalis
  - Genus: Toxicodryas
    - Blanding's tree snake, Toxicodryas blandingii
    - Fischer's cat snake, Toxicodryas pulverulenta
- Family: Lamprophiidae
  - Genus: Amblyodipsas
    - Western purple-glossed snake, Amblyodipsas unicolor
  - Genus: Aparallactus
    - Lined centipede-eater, Aparallactus lineatus
    - Reticulated centipede-eater, Aparallactus lunulatus
    - Western forest centipede-eater, Aparallactus modestus
  - Genus: Atractaspis
    - Slender burrowing asp, Atractaspis aterrima
    - Fat burrowing asp, Atractaspis corpulenta
    - Dahomey burrowing asp, Atractaspis dahomeyensis
    - Variable burrowing asp, Atractaspis irregularis
  - Genus: Boaedon
    - Striped house snake, Boaedon lineatus
    - Olive house snake, Boaedon olivaceus
    - Hallowell's house snake, Boaedon virgatus
  - Genus: Bothrophthalmus
    - Red-black striped snake, Bothrophthalmus lineatus
  - Genus: Chamaelycus
    - African banded snake, Chamaelycus fasciatus
  - Genus: Gonionotophis
    - Savanna lesser file snake, Gonionotophis grantii
    - Mocquard's file snake, Gonionotophis guirali
    - Matschie's file snake, Gonionotophis klingi
    - Western forest file snake, Gonionotophis poensis
    - Small-eyed file snake, Gonionotophis steophthalmus
  - Genus: Hormonotus
    - Uganda house snake, Hormonotus modestus
  - Genus: Lycophidion
    - Leach's wolf snake, Lycophidion irroratum
    - Flat wolf snake, Lycophidion laterale
    - Lycophidion nigromaculatum
    - Lycophidion semicinctum
  - Genus: Malpolon
    - Moila snake, Malpolon moilensis
  - Genus: Polemon
    - Reinhardt's snake-eater, Polemon acanthias
    - Ivory Coast snake-eater, Polemon neuwiedi
  - Genus: Prosymna
    - Prosymna greigerti
    - Ghana shovel-snout, Prosymna meleagris
  - Genus: Psammophis
    - Elegant sand racer, Psammophis elegans
    - Lined olympic snake, Psammophis lineatus
    - Olive grass racer, Psammophis phillipsii
    - Ornate olympic snake, Psammophis praeornatus
    - Rukwa sand racer, Psammophis rukwae
  - Genus: Psammophylax
    - Striped beaked snake, Psammophylax acutus
  - Genus: Rhamphiophis
    - Western beaked snake, Rhamphiophis oxyrhynchus
- Family: Elapidae
  - Genus: Dendroaspis
    - Jameson's mamba, Dendroaspis jamesoni
    - Western green mamba, Dendroaspis viridis
  - Genus: Elapsoidea
    - Angolan garter snake, Elapsoidea semiannulata
  - Genus: Naja
    - Mali cobra, Naja katiensis
    - Forest cobra, Naja melanoleuca
    - Black-necked spitting cobra, Naja nigricollis
    - Senegalese cobra, Naja senegalensis
  - Genus: Pseudohaje
    - African tree cobra, Pseudohaje goldii
    - Hoodless cobra Pseudohaje nigra
- Family: Viperidae (adders and vipers)
  - Genus: Atheris
    - Western bush viper, Atheris chlorechis
    - African bush viper, Atheris squamigera
  - Genus: Bitis
    - Puff adder, Bitis arietans
    - Gaboon adder, Bitis gabonica
    - Rhinoceros viper, Bitis nasicornis
  - Genus: Causus
    - Forest night adder, Causus lichtensteinii
    - Spotted night adder, Causus maculatus
    - Common night adder, Causus rhombeatus
  - Genus: Echis
    - African saw-scaled viper, Echis ocellatus
- Family: Typhlopidae (blind snakes)
  - Genus: Afrotyphlops
    - Common lined worm snake, Afrotyphlops lineolatus
    - Spotted blind snake, Afrotyphlops punctatus
  - Genus: Guinea
    - Two-coloured blind snake, Guinea bicolor
    - Sundevall's worm snake, Guinea sundewalli
  - Genus: Leptotyphlops
    - West African blind snake, Leptotyphlops debilis
  - Genus: Letheobia
    - Gabon beaked snake, Letheobia caeca
  - Genus: Myriopholis
    - Long-nosed worm snake, Myriopholis macrorhyncha
  - Genus: Typhlops
    - Typhlops coecatus

== Order: Crocodylidae (crocodiles and relatives) ==
- Family: Crocodylus (crocodiles)
  - Genus: Crocodylus
    - West African crocodile, Crocodylus suchus
  - Genus: Mecistops
    - West African slender-snouted crocodile, Mecistops cataphractus CR
  - Genus: Osteolaemus
    - West African dwarf crocodile, Osteolaemus tetraspis VU

== See also ==
- List of chordate orders
- List of regional reptiles lists
