= Variable marsh snake =

There are two species of snake named variable marsh snake:

- Natriciteres variegata, species of natricine snake found across Africa
- Natriciteres pembana, species of natricine snake found on Pemba Island in Tanzania
