= Tropical mabuya =

tropical mabuya may refer to:

- Trachylepis paucisquamis
- Trachylepis polytropis

== See also ==
- Skink
