= Fat-tailed gecko =

There are two genera of lizards named fat-tailed geckos:

- Diplodactylus, all species found in Australia
- Hemitheconyx, both species found in Africa
