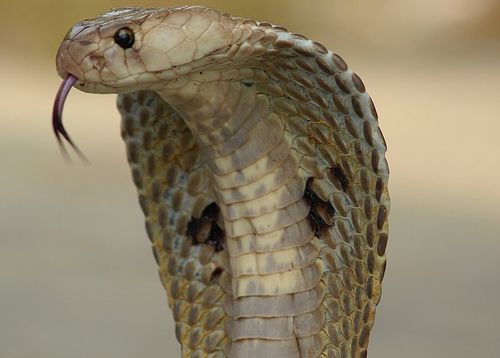
- Indian cobra (Naja naja)

Scientific classification
- Kingdom: Animalia
- Phylum: Chordata
- Class: Reptilia
- Order: Squamata
- Clade: Ophidia
- Suborder: Serpentes

Subdivisions
- Genus Naja of family Elapidae; Several species within other genera of Elapidae; Species Hydrodynastes gigas of family Colubridae

= Cobra =

Cobra Informal name for various snakes Temporal range: Miocene–Holocene

Cobra is the common name of various venomous snakes, most of which belong to the genus Naja.

Many cobras are capable of rearing upwards and producing a hood when threatened. (Note: Two kinds of non-venomous snake, the hognose snakes and the striped keelback, also rear upwards and produce hoods but are not considered "cobras"; likewise, some venomous elapid snakes, such as the black mamba, are also capable of producing hoods but are not called "cobras".)

== Other snakes known as "cobras" ==
While the members of the genus Naja constitute the true cobras, the name cobra is also applied to these other genera and species:

- The rinkhals, ringhals or ring-necked spitting cobra (Hemachatus haemachatus) so-called for its neck band as well as its habit of rearing upwards and producing a hood when threatened
- The king cobra or hamadryad (Ophiophagus hannah)
- The two species of tree cobras, Goldie's tree cobra (Pseudohaje goldii) and the black tree cobra (Pseudohaje nigra)
- The two species of shield-nosed cobras, the Cape coral snake (Aspidelaps lubricus) and the shield-nosed cobra (Aspidelaps scutatus)
- The two species of black desert cobras or desert black snakes, Walterinnesia aegyptia and Walterinnesia morgani, neither of which rears upwards and produces a hood when threatened
- The eastern coral snake or American cobra (Micrurus fulvius), which also does not rear upwards and produce a hood when threatened

The false water cobra (Hydrodynastes gigas) is the only "cobra" species that is not a member of the Elapidae. It does not rear upwards, produces only a slight flattening of the neck when threatened, and is only mildly venomous.
