= Goldie's tree cobra =

Pseudohaje goldii

Conservation status
- Least Concern (IUCN 3.1)

Scientific classification
- Kingdom: Animalia
- Phylum: Chordata
- Class: Reptilia
- Order: Squamata
- Suborder: Serpentes
- Family: Elapidae
- Genus: Pseudohaje
- Species: P. goldii

Binomial name
- Pseudohaje goldii (Boulenger, 1895)
- Geographic range of P. goldii in red.

Synonyms
- Naia goldii Boulenger, 1895; Naia yakomae Mocquard, 1896; Naia guentheri Boulenger, 1897; Naja goldii — K.P. Schmidt, 1923; Pseudohaje goldii — Bogert, 1942

Species of snake

Goldie's tree cobra (Pseudohaje goldii), also known commonly as the African tree cobra and (in error) as Gold's tree cobra, is a species of venomous tree cobra (genus Pseudohaje meaning "false cobra") in the family Elapidae. The species is native to Central and Western Africa. This species is one of the two tree cobras in Africa, the other being the black tree cobra (Pseudohaje nigra). Goldie's tree cobra is one of the most venomous snakes and creatures in Africa.

== Taxonomy and etymology ==
Belgian-British zoologist George Albert Boulenger described the species in 1895 as Naia goldii. The specific name, goldii, is in honor of George Taubman Goldie, a Manx administrator in Nigeria.

== Description ==
Goldie's tree cobra is one of the largest venomous snakes in Africa, measuring 2.2–2.7 metres (7.2–8.9 ft) in total length (including tail). The dorsal body color of this species is glossy black. It has a cylindrical body with a long, spiky tail, which makes the snake more adaptable to arboreal life. The head is small with exceptionally large eyes, giving the snake excellent eyesight. There are usually 15 rows of dorsal scales at midbody, though there are rare specimens that have 17 rows.

== Geographic range ==
Goldie's tree cobra can be found in Central and Western Equatorial African countries, including Angola, Burundi, Cameroon, Central African Republic, Democratic Republic of the Congo, Republic of Congo, Equatorial Guinea, Gabon, Ghana, Ivory Coast, Kenya, Nigeria, Rwanda, and Uganda.

== Habitat ==
Being an arboreal species, P. goldii inhabits forests and woodlands along rivers and streams, at altitudes from sea level to 2,000 m (6,600 ft). However, it has also been found in artificial habitats such as ornamental gardens and plantain plantations.

== Behavior ==
Despite its large size, Goldie's tree cobra is a highly agile snake. It is equally comfortable in trees, on ground and in water. It can move quickly and gracefully through trees with the aid of its spiky tail. It is also a very secretive snake which is rarely seen by people. However, it is one of the few snakes that are considered aggressive. When threatened, it rears up and spreads a typical cobra hood, though its hood is much narrower than that of Naja naja. If it is further provoked, the snake may attempt to bite. Though it cannot spit its venom, its bite is very potent and potentially lethal. It is reputedly ill-tempered. It may also use its tail spike to defend itself if restrained.

== Venom ==
P. goldii venom is one of the most toxic and deadly of all African snakes. Venom of this species is primarily a neurotoxin, like most Elapidae. It is quick acting and extremely potent, easily killing a person. Moreover, there is no known specific antivenom made. Bite symptoms include swelling and stinging pain around the bite wound, numbness of limbs and lip, severe difficulty in breathing, sweating profusely and blurred vision. Victims may die of respiratory failure. A number of people are killed by this species.

== Diet ==
P. goldii preys predominately upon arboreal frogs, birds, and mammals such as squirrels, but will also eat terrestrial frogs and even fish.

== Reproduction ==
P. goldii is oviparous. The female will lay 10 to 20 eggs.
