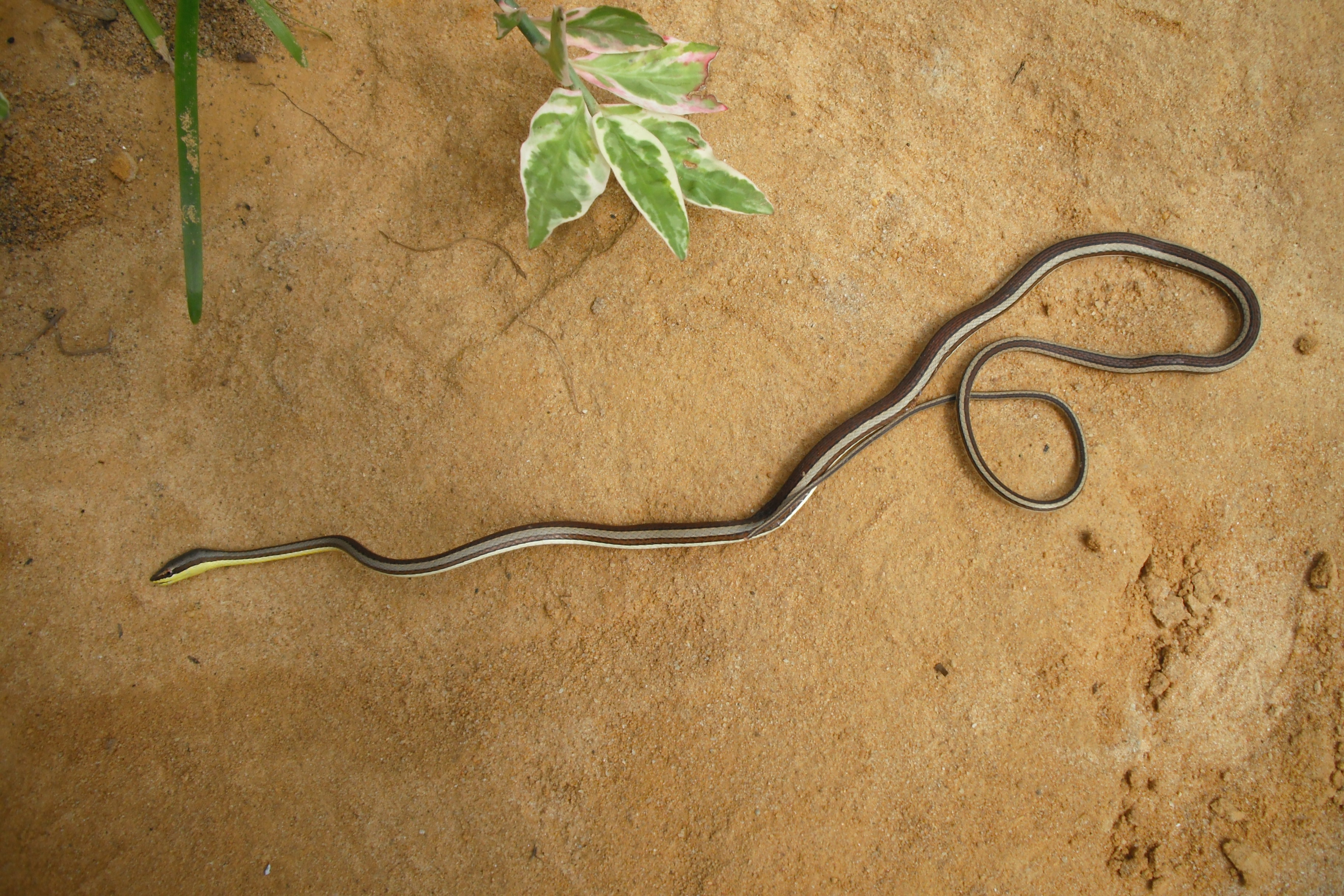

Conservation status
- Least Concern (IUCN 3.1)

Scientific classification
- Kingdom: Animalia
- Phylum: Chordata
- Class: Reptilia
- Order: Squamata
- Suborder: Serpentes
- Family: Psammophiidae
- Genus: Psammophis
- Species: P. elegans

Binomial name
- Psammophis elegans (Shaw, 1802)

Subspecies
- Psammophis elegans elegans (Shaw, 1802); Psammophis elegans univittatus Perret, 1961

Synonyms
- Coluber elegans Shaw, 1802

= Psammophis elegans =

Species of snake

Psammophis elegans, the elegant sand racer, is a species of psammophiid snake. It is found in tropical Africa.

The species is diurnal, and mainly hunts lizards.

== See also ==
- List of reptiles of Ghana
