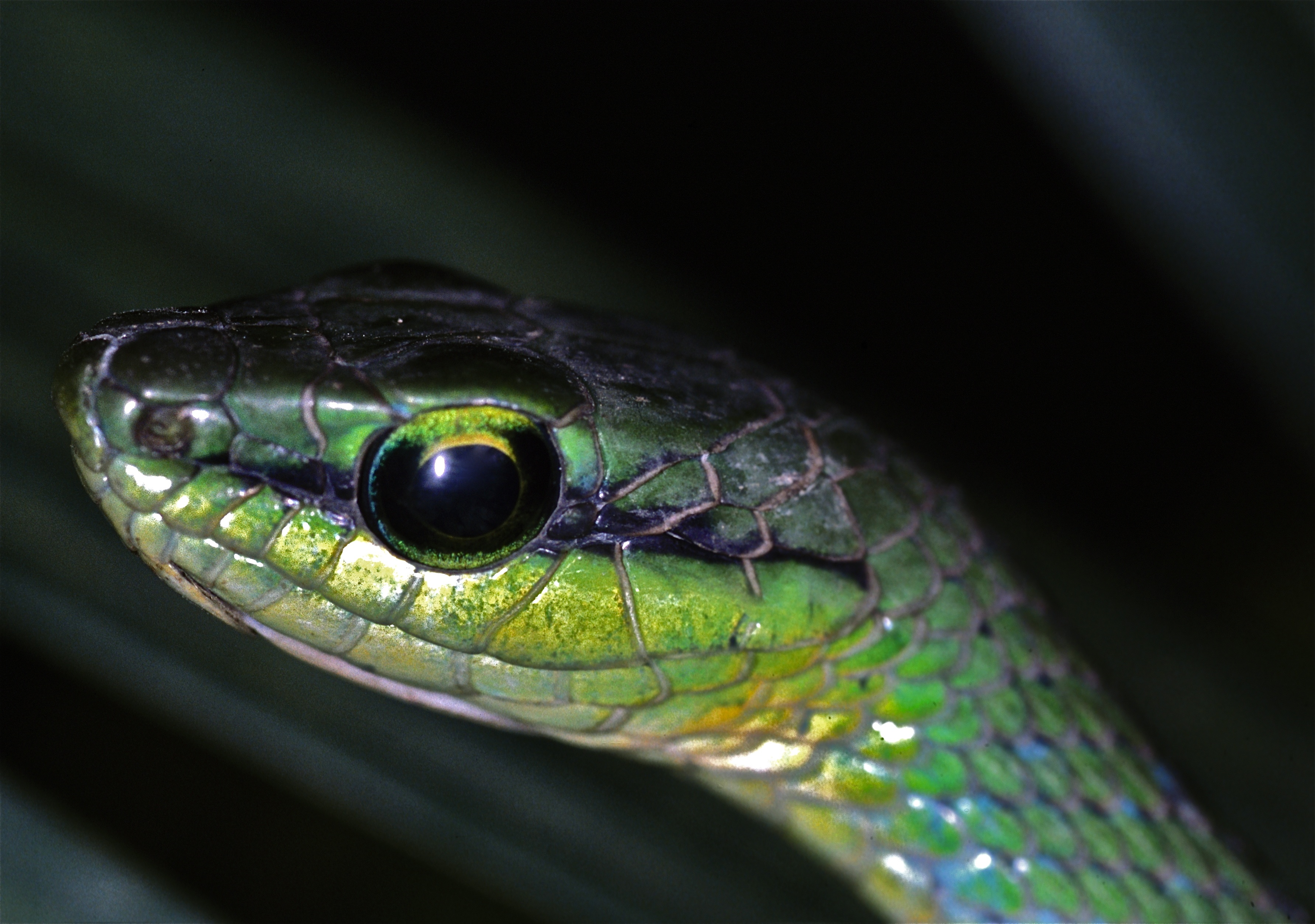
- Hapsidophrys smaragdinus

Scientific classification
- Kingdom: Animalia
- Phylum: Chordata
- Class: Reptilia
- Order: Squamata
- Suborder: Serpentes
- Family: Colubridae
- Subfamily: Colubrinae
- Genus: Hapsidophrys; Fischer, 1856

= Hapsidophrys =

Genus of snakes

Hapsidophrys is a genus of snakes of the family Colubridae.

== Species ==
- Hapsidophrys lineatus Fischer, 1856 - black-lined green snake
- Hapsidophrys principis (Boulenger, 1906)
- Hapsidophrys smaragdinus (Schlegel, 1837) - emerald snake
