= Natriciteres bipostocularis =

Conservation status
- Least Concern (IUCN 3.1)

Scientific classification
- Kingdom: Animalia
- Phylum: Chordata
- Class: Reptilia
- Order: Squamata
- Suborder: Serpentes
- Family: Colubridae
- Genus: Natriciteres
- Species: N. bipostocularis

Binomial name
- Natriciteres bipostocularis Broadley, 1962

Species of snake

Natriciteres bipostocularis, the southwestern forest marsh snake, is a species of natricine snake found in Zambia, the Democratic Republic of the Congo, and Angola.
