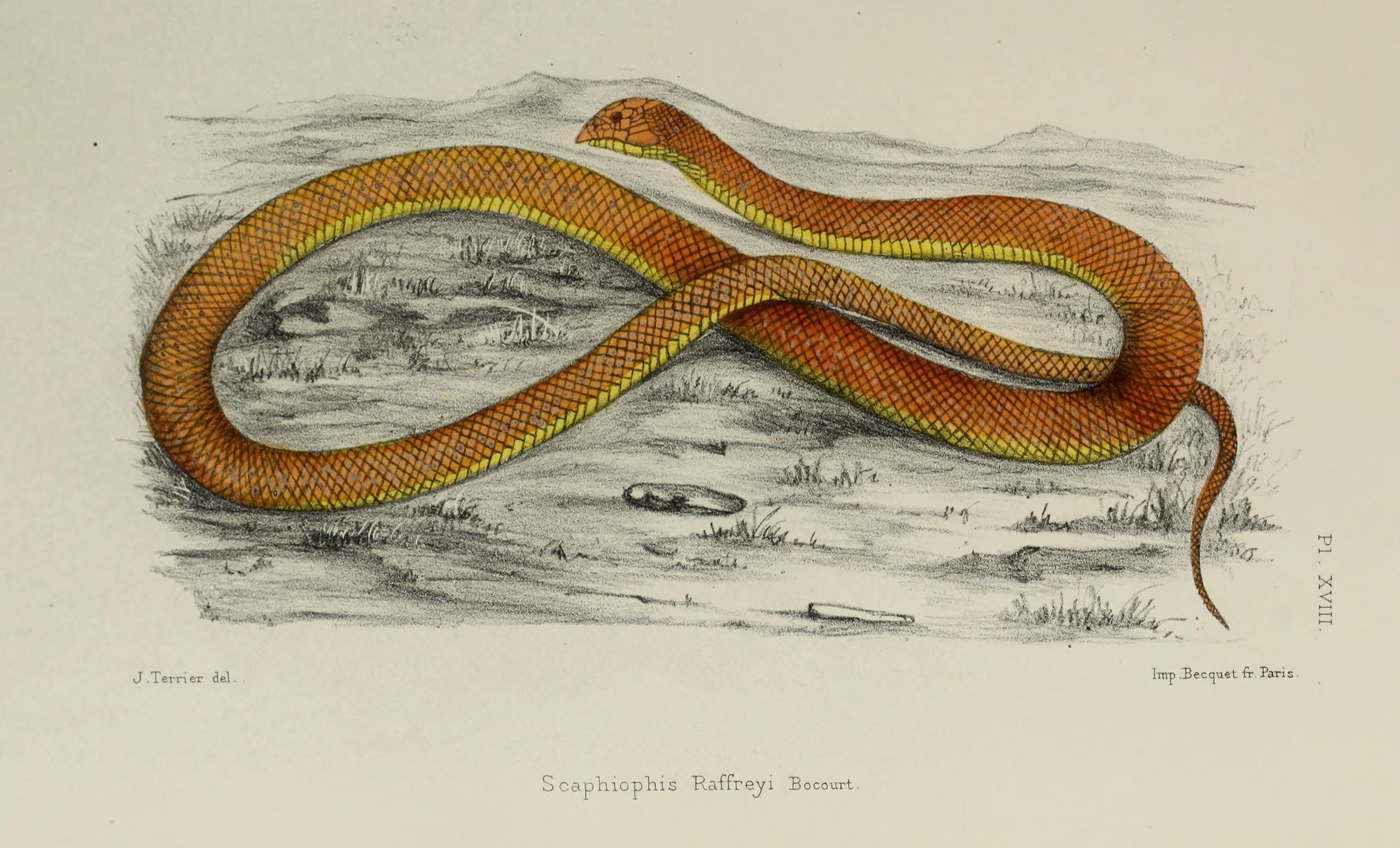

Conservation status
- Least Concern (IUCN 3.1)

Scientific classification
- Kingdom: Animalia
- Phylum: Chordata
- Class: Reptilia
- Order: Squamata
- Suborder: Serpentes
- Family: Colubridae
- Genus: Scaphiophis
- Species: S. raffreyi

Binomial name
- Scaphiophis raffreyi Bocourt, 1875

= Scaphiophis raffreyi =

Species of snake

Scaphiophis raffreyi, the Ethiopian hook-nosed snake, is a species of snake of the family Colubridae.

The snake is found in central Africa.
