= Hapsidophrys principis =

Conservation status
- Least Concern (IUCN 3.1)

Scientific classification
- Kingdom: Animalia
- Phylum: Chordata
- Class: Reptilia
- Order: Squamata
- Suborder: Serpentes
- Family: Colubridae
- Genus: Hapsidophrys
- Species: H. principis

Binomial name
- Hapsidophrys principis (Boulenger, 1906)

Synonyms
- Gastropyxis principis Boulenger, 1906

Species of snake

Hapsidophrys principis is a species of snake in the family Colubridae. It was described by George Albert Boulenger in 1906. The species occurs on the island of Príncipe in São Tomé and Príncipe, in elevations between 100 and 300 meters above sea level.
