= Hapsidophrys lineatus =

Conservation status
- Least Concern (IUCN 3.1)

Scientific classification
- Kingdom: Animalia
- Phylum: Chordata
- Class: Reptilia
- Order: Squamata
- Suborder: Serpentes
- Family: Colubridae
- Genus: Hapsidophrys
- Species: H. lineatus

Binomial name
- Hapsidophrys lineatus Fischer, 1856

Species of snake

Hapsidophrys lineatus, the black-lined green snake, is a species of non-venomous snake in the family Colubridae. The species is found in Africa.
