= Fischer's dwarf gecko =

Conservation status
- Least Concern (IUCN 3.1)

Scientific classification
- Kingdom: Animalia
- Phylum: Chordata
- Class: Reptilia
- Order: Squamata
- Suborder: Gekkota
- Family: Gekkonidae
- Genus: Lygodactylus
- Species: L. fischeri

Binomial name
- Lygodactylus fischeri Boulenger, 1890

Species of lizard

Fischer's dwarf gecko (Lygodactylus fischeri) is a species of lizard in the family Gekkonidae. The species is native to West Africa and Central Africa.

== Etymology ==
The specific name, fischeri, is in honor of German herpetologist Johann Gustav Fischer.

== Geographic range ==
L. fischeri is found in Gabon, Equatorial Guinea, Cameroon, and southeast Nigeria, with a single, isolated record from Benin. The record from Sierra Leone is questionable.

== Ecology ==
L. fischeri is a rare and highly cryptic species occurring in closed humid forest and gallery forest. It is probably an insectivore feeding on ants.

== Description ==
Dorsally, L. fischeri is light olive green, with several longitudinal series of small black dots. Ventrally, it is uniformly white. The holotype has a snout-to-vent length (SVL) of 3.5 cm (1.4 in).

== Reproduction ==
L. fischeri is oviparous.
