= Taylor's fat-tailed gecko =

Conservation status
- Least Concern (IUCN 3.1)

Scientific classification
- Kingdom: Animalia
- Phylum: Chordata
- Class: Reptilia
- Order: Squamata
- Suborder: Gekkota
- Family: Eublepharidae
- Genus: Hemitheconyx
- Species: H. taylori

Binomial name
- Hemitheconyx taylori Parker, 1930

Species of lizard

Taylor's fat-tailed gecko (Hemitheconyx taylori), also known commonly as Taylor's fat-tail gecko, is a species of lizard in the family Eublepharidae. The species is native to northeastern Africa.

== Etymology ==
The specific name, taylori, is in honor of British army officer Captain R. H. R. Taylor.

== Geographic range ==
H. taylori is found in eastern Ethiopia and northern Somalia.

== Habitat ==
The preferred natural habitat of H. taylori is desert, at altitudes of 2,100–4,100 ft (640–1,250 m). They reportedly survive the dry landscape by adopting a nocturnal and even semi-fossorial lifestyle.

== Reproduction ==
H. taylori is oviparous.
