= Cophoscincopus senegalensis =

Conservation status
- Data Deficient (IUCN 3.1)

Scientific classification
- Kingdom: Animalia
- Phylum: Chordata
- Class: Reptilia
- Order: Squamata
- Family: Scincidae
- Genus: Cophoscincopus
- Species: C. senegalensis

Binomial name
- Cophoscincopus senegalensis J.-F. Trape, Mediannikov, & S. Trape, 2012

Species of lizard

Cophoscincopus senegalensis is a species of lizard in the family Scincidae. It is found in Senegal and Guinea.
