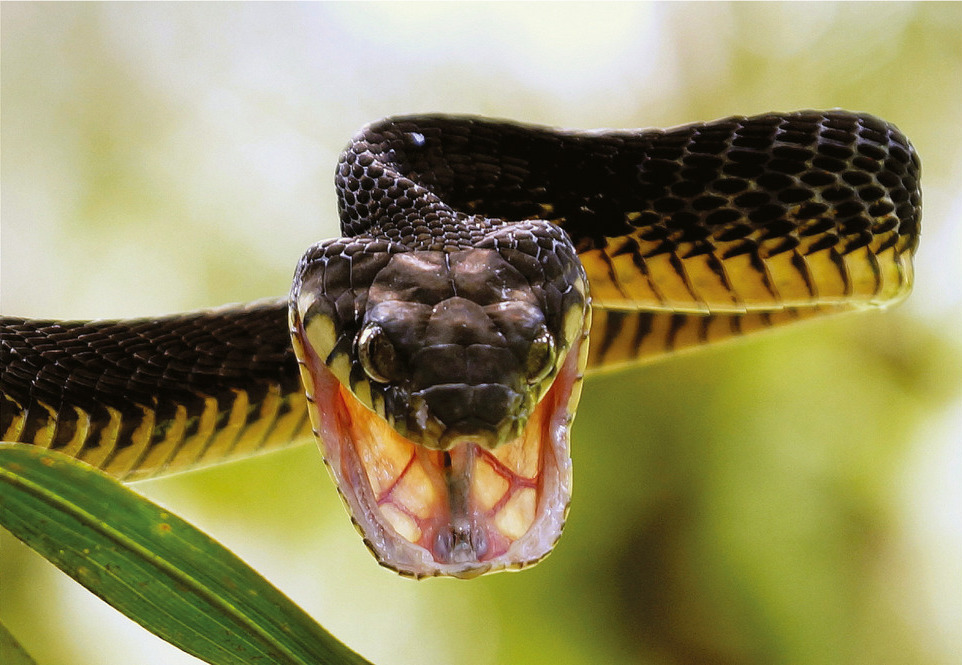
- Toxicodryas vexator

Scientific classification
- Kingdom: Animalia
- Phylum: Chordata
- Class: Reptilia
- Order: Squamata
- Suborder: Serpentes
- Family: Colubridae
- Subfamily: Colubrinae
- Genus: Toxicodryas; Hallowell, 1857

= Toxicodryas =

Genus of snakes

Toxicodryas is a genus of rear-fanged venomous snakes in the family Colubridae.

== Geographic range ==
The genus Toxicodryas is native to Sub-Saharan Africa.

== Species ==
Four species are recognized as being valid.

- Toxicodryas adamanteus Greenbaum et al., 2021
- Toxicodryas blandingii (Hallowell, 1844) - Blanding's tree snake
- Toxicodryas pulverulenta (Fischer, 1856) - Fischer's cat snake
- Toxicodryas vexator Greenbaum et al., 2021

Nota bene: A binomial authority in parentheses indicates that the species was originally described in a genus other than Toxicodryas.
