= Natriciteres sylvatica =

Conservation status
- Least Concern (IUCN 3.1)

Scientific classification
- Kingdom: Animalia
- Phylum: Chordata
- Class: Reptilia
- Order: Squamata
- Suborder: Serpentes
- Family: Colubridae
- Genus: Natriciteres
- Species: N. sylvatica

Binomial name
- Natriciteres sylvatica Broadley, 1966

Species of snake

Natriciteres sylvatica, the forest marsh snake, is a species of natricine snake found in Tanzania, Mozambique, Malawi, Zimbabwe, and South Africa.
