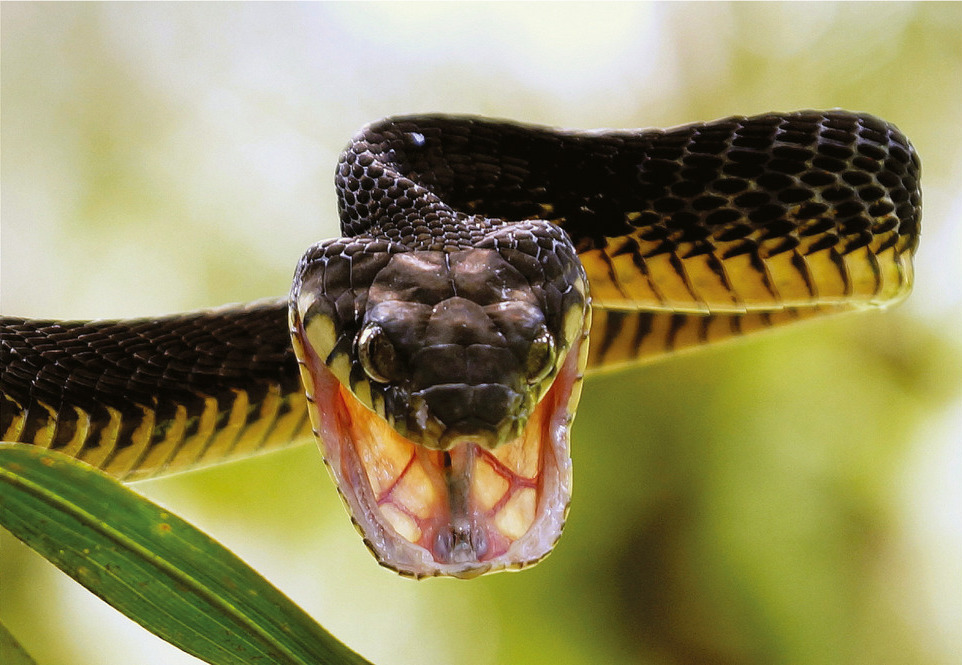
- Snake species in North Africa

Scientific classification
- Kingdom: Animalia
- Phylum: Chordata
- Class: Reptilia
- Order: Squamata
- Suborder: Serpentes
- Family: Colubridae
- Genus: Toxicodryas
- Species: T. vexator

Binomial name
- Toxicodryas vexator Greenbaum, Allen, Vaughan, Pauwels, Wallach, Kusamba, Muringa, Aris-Tote, Mali, Badjedjea, Penner, Rodel, Rivera, Sterkhova, Johnson, Tapondju, & Brown, 2021

= Toxicodryas vexator =

Species of snake

Toxicodryas vexator is a species of snake of the family Colubridae.

The snake is found in the Democratic Republic of Congo.
