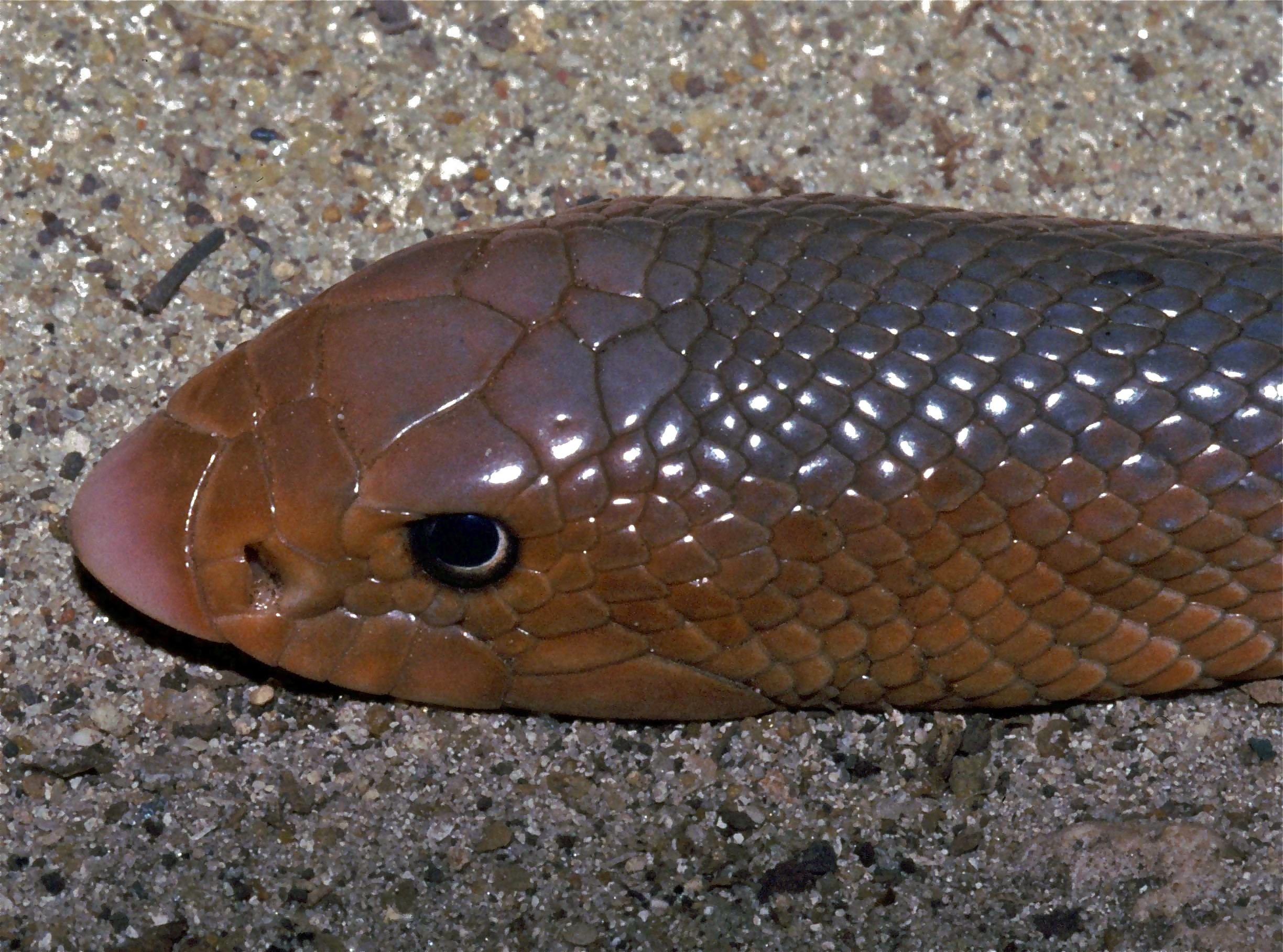

Conservation status
- Least Concern (IUCN 3.1)

Scientific classification
- Kingdom: Animalia
- Phylum: Chordata
- Class: Reptilia
- Order: Squamata
- Suborder: Serpentes
- Family: Colubridae
- Genus: Scaphiophis
- Species: S. albopunctatus

Binomial name
- Scaphiophis albopunctatus Peters, 1870

= Scaphiophis albopunctatus =

Species of snake

Scaphiophis albopunctatus, the African shovel-nosed snake, is a non-venomous species of snake in the family Colubridae.

This snake is found across Central and Western Africa, and some areas of Eastern and Southern Africa, including in Benin, Burundi, Cameroon, the Central African Republic, the Democratic Republic of the Congo, the Republic of Congo, Ethiopia, Ghana, Guinea, Kenya, Liberia, Niger, Nigeria, Rwanda, Sierra Leone, Sudan, Tanzania, Togo, Uganda and Zambia

A mainly fossorial snake, its preferred habitats are dry savanna to open forest savanna, miombo woodland, moist grassland, moist woodland to primary lowland rainforest, and deciduous bushlands and thickets, where it feeds primarily on rodents; at times, it will repurpose or take over the burrows inhabited by its prey, such as those of ground squirrels.
