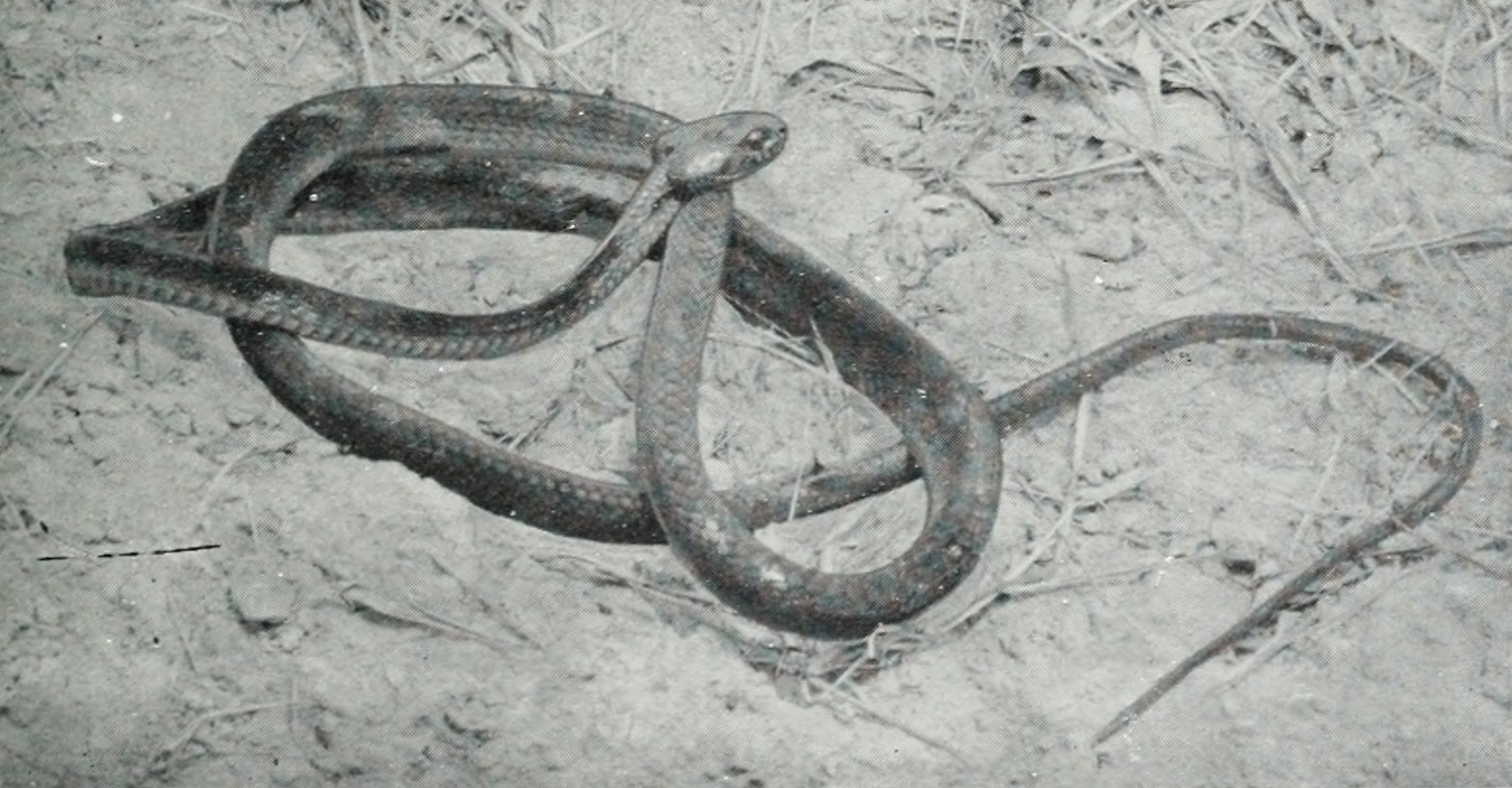

Conservation status
- Least Concern (IUCN 3.1)

Scientific classification
- Kingdom: Animalia
- Phylum: Chordata
- Class: Reptilia
- Order: Squamata
- Suborder: Serpentes
- Family: Colubridae
- Genus: Toxicodryas
- Species: T. blandingii

Binomial name
- Toxicodryas blandingii (Hallowell, 1844)

Synonyms
- Dipsas blandingii Hallowell, 1844; Toxicodryas blandingii Hallowell, 1857; Dipsadomorphus blandingii F. Werner, 1899; Boiga blandingii Schmidt, 1923; Toxicodryas blandingii Wallach et al., 2014

= Toxicodryas blandingii =

Species of snake

Toxicodryas blandingii, commonly known as Blanding's cat snake and Blanding's tree snake, is a species of rear-fanged venomous snake of the family Colubridae. The species is endemic to Sub-Saharan Africa.

== Etymology ==
The specific name, blandingii, is in honor of William Blanding (1772–1857), an American physician and naturalist.

== Geographic range ==
T. blandingii is found in Angola, Benin, Cameroon, Central African Republic, Congo, DR Congo, Equatorial Guinea, Gabon, Gambia, Ghana, Guinea, Guinea-Bissau, Ivory Coast, Kenya, Liberia, Nigeria, Senegal, Sierra Leone, Sudan, Togo, Uganda, and Zambia.

== Habitat ==
The preferred natural habitats of T. blandingii are forest and savanna, at altitudes from sea level to 2,200 m (7,200 ft). However, it is also found in gardens, parks, and in and around houses.

== Description ==
T. blandingii is a long and slender species. The longest specimen measured by Boulenger (1896) had a total length of 2.2 m (7.2 ft), including a tail 0.5 m (1.6 ft) long.

== Diet ==
T. blandingii preys upon lizards including dwarf chameleons, small mammals including bats, and birds.

== Reproduction ==
T. blandingii is oviparous. Clutch size is 7–14 eggs.
