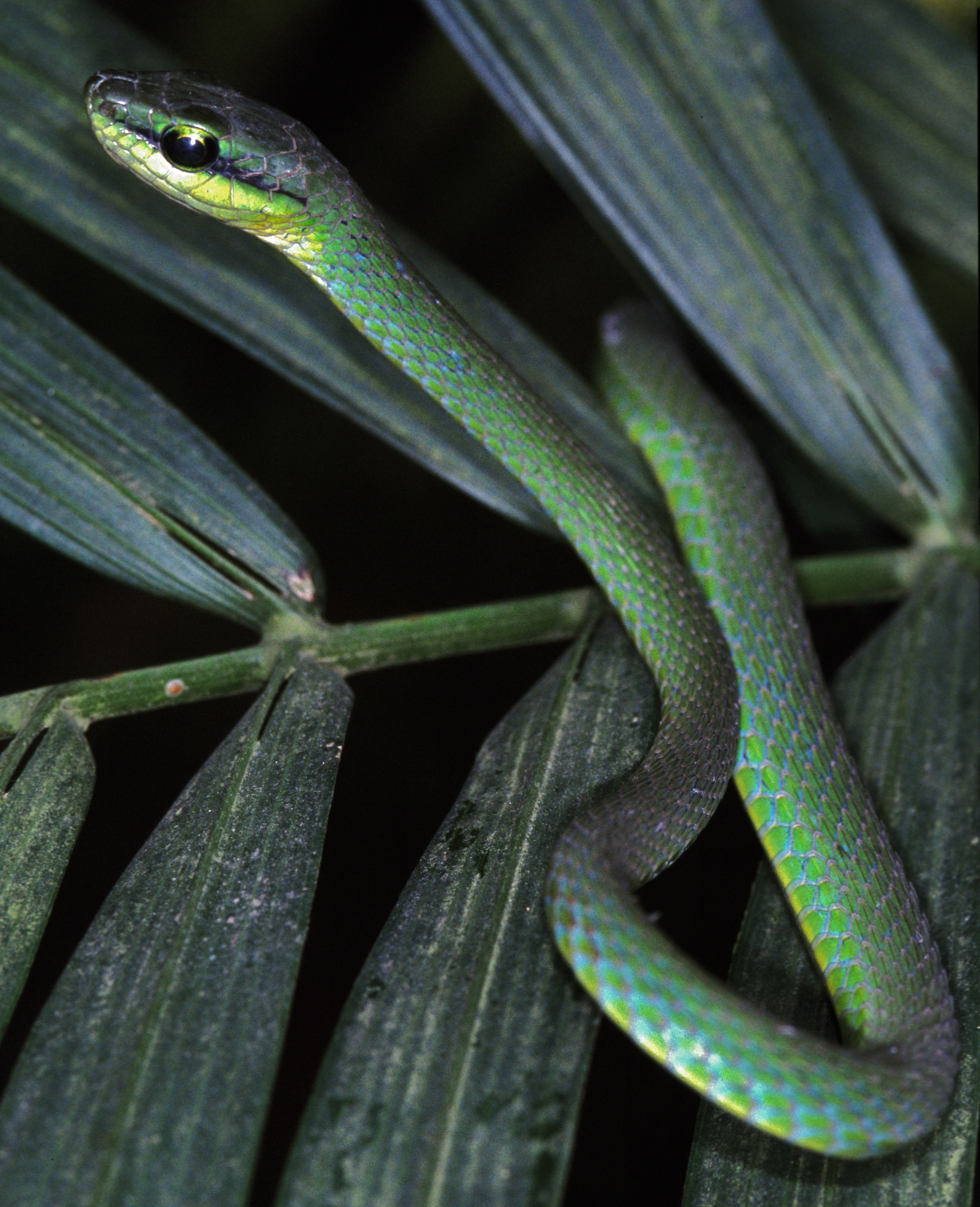

Conservation status
- Least Concern (IUCN 3.1)

Scientific classification
- Kingdom: Animalia
- Phylum: Chordata
- Class: Reptilia
- Order: Squamata
- Suborder: Serpentes
- Family: Colubridae
- Genus: Hapsidophrys
- Species: H. smaragdinus

Binomial name
- Hapsidophrys smaragdinus (Schlegel, 1837)

Synonyms
- Hapsidophrys smaragdina

= Emerald snake =

Species of snake

The emerald snake (Hapsidophrys smaragdinus) is a species of snake of the family Colubridae.

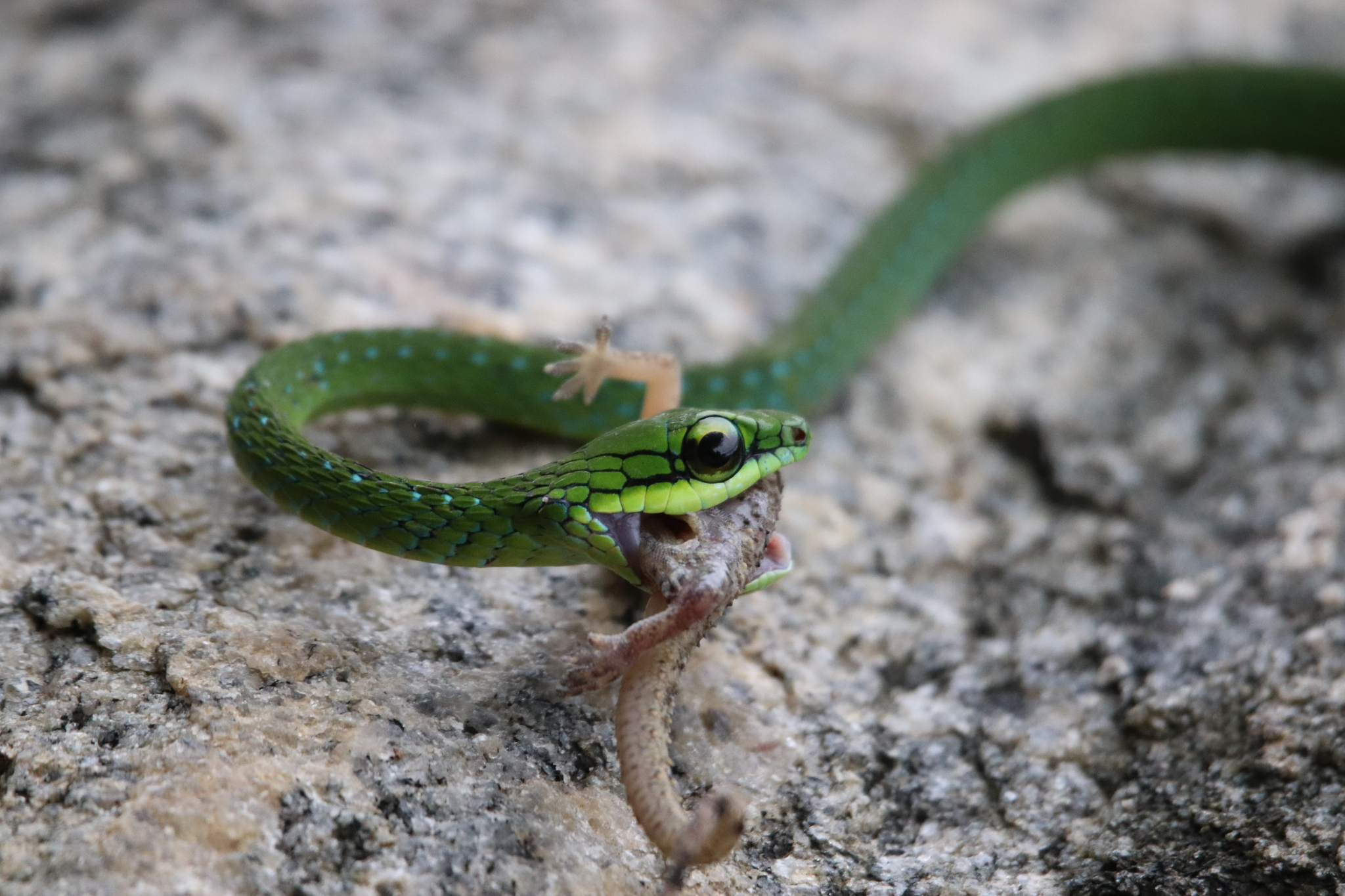
Eating a house gecko.

== Geographic range ==
The snake is found in Africa.

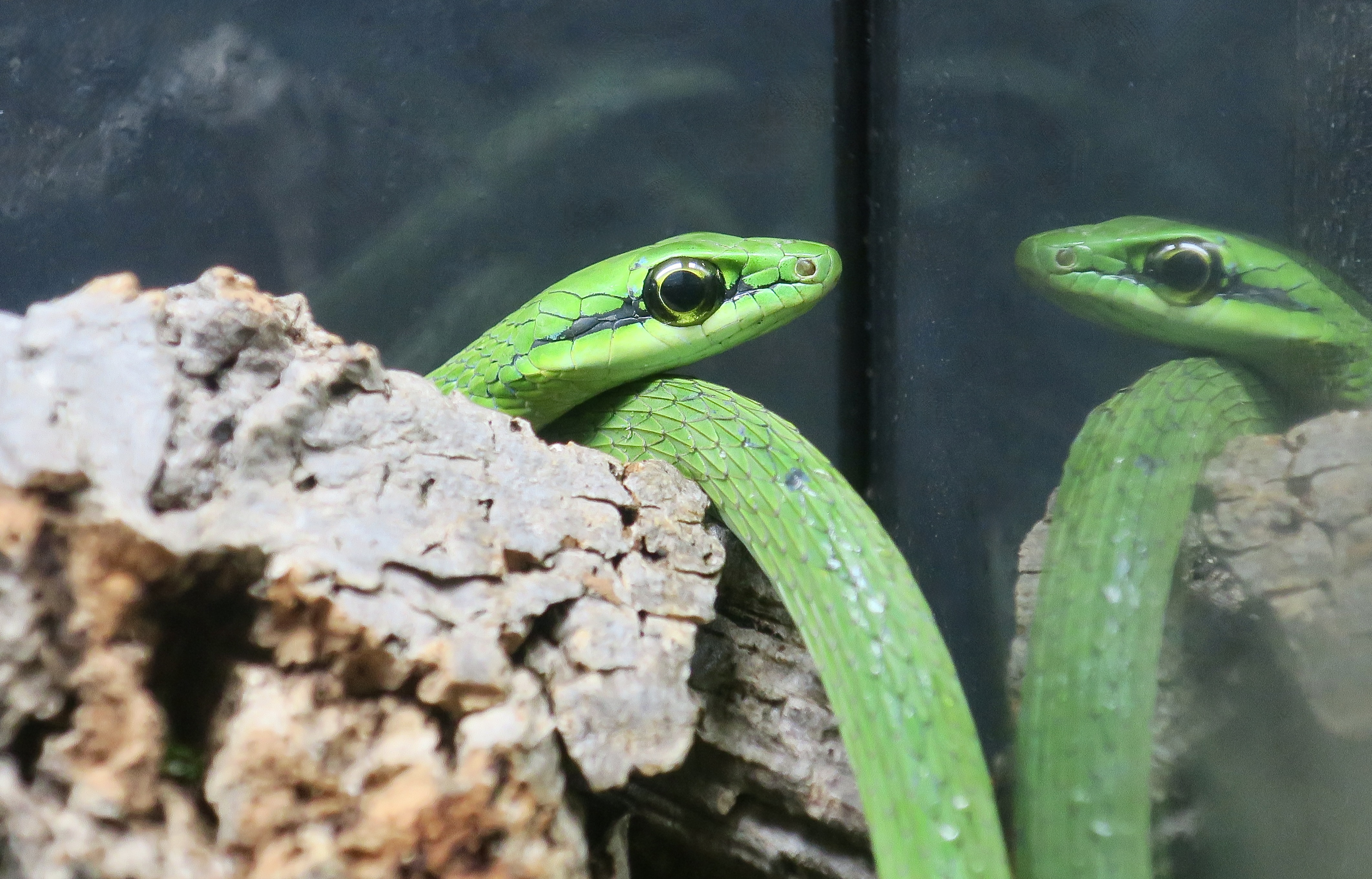
At LLL Reptiles, a reptile store in Henderson, Nevada.
