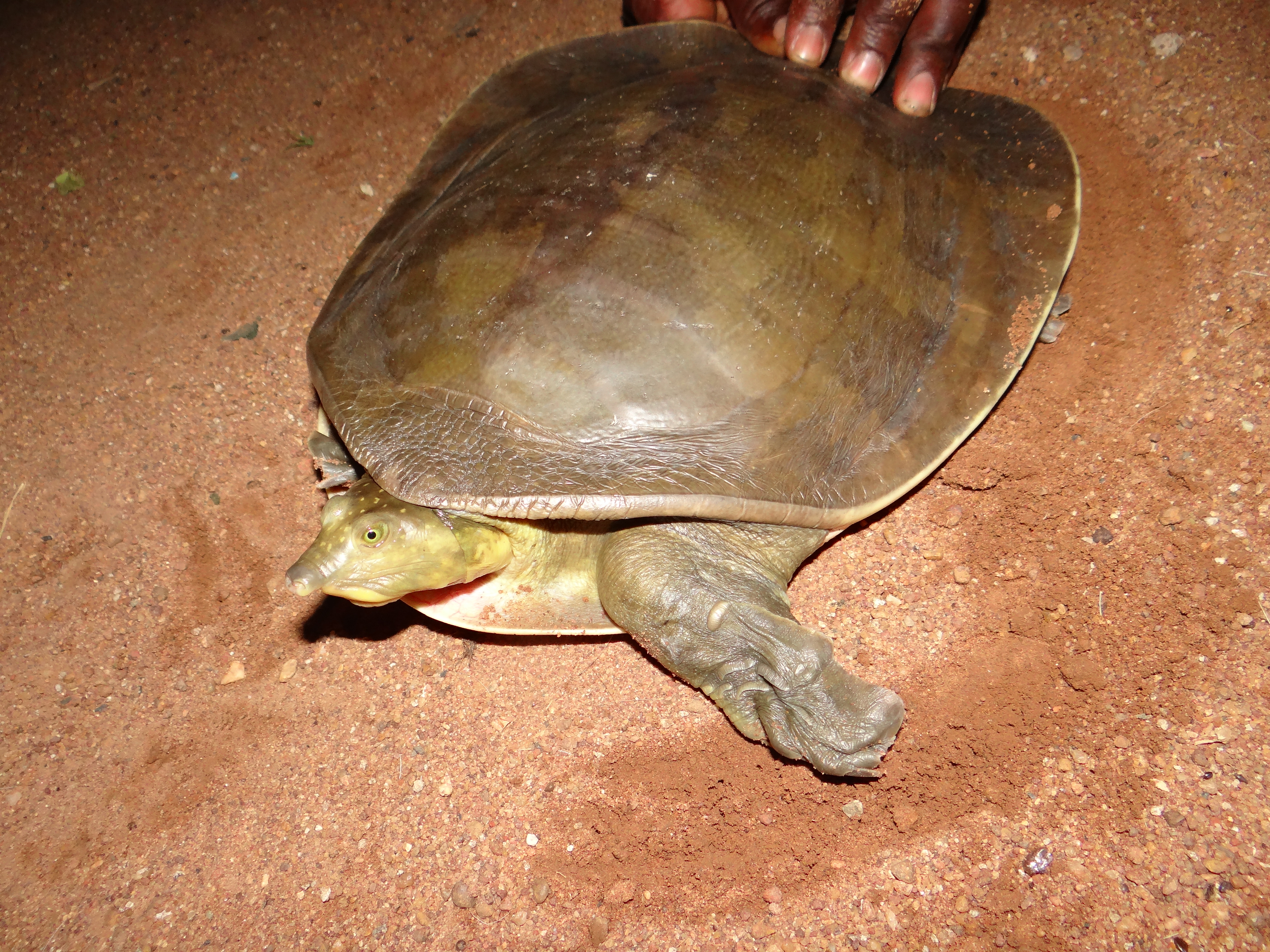

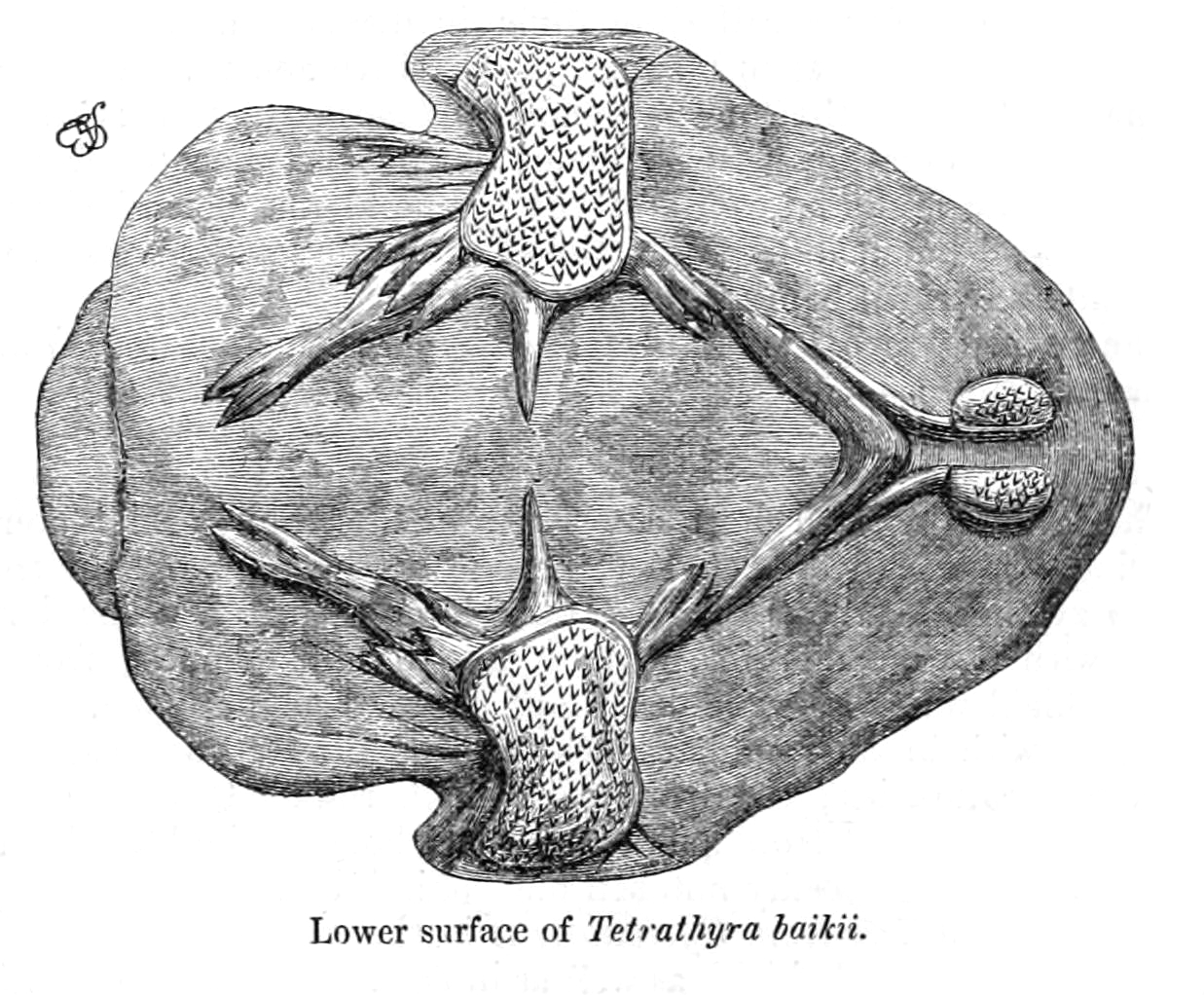
- Underside of shell

Conservation status
- Vulnerable (IUCN 3.1)
- CITES Appendix II

Scientific classification
- Kingdom: Animalia
- Phylum: Chordata
- Class: Reptilia
- Order: Testudines
- Suborder: Cryptodira
- Family: Trionychidae
- Genus: Cyclanorbis
- Species: C. senegalensis

Binomial name
- Cyclanorbis senegalensis (A.M.C. Duméril & Bibron, 1835)

Synonyms
- Cryptopus senegalensis A.M.C. Duméril & Bibron, 1835; Emyda senegalensis — Gray, 1844; Cyclanorbis petersii Gray, 1854; Cyclanosteus petersii — Gray, 1856; Cycloderma senegalense — A.H.A. Duméril, 1860 (ex errore); Cycloderma petersii — Strauch, 1862; Cyclanosteus senegalensis — Gray, 1864; Tetrathyra baikii Gray, 1865; Tetrathyra vaillantii Rochebrune, 1884; Cyclanorbis senegalensis — Boulenger, 1889

= Senegal flapshell turtle =

Species of turtle

The Senegal flapshell turtle (Cyclanorbis senegalensis) is a species of turtle in the subfamily Cyclanorbinae of the family Trionychidae. The species, which is one of two species of softshell turtles in the genus Cyclanorbis, is endemic to Africa.

== Geographic range ==
C. senegalensis is found in Benin, Burkina Faso, Cameroon, Central African Republic, Chad, Ivory Coast, Ethiopia, Gambia, Ghana, Guinea-Bissau, Liberia, Mali, Niger, Nigeria, Senegal, Sierra Leone, South Sudan, Sudan, and Togo.

== Habitat ==
The preferred natural habitats of C. senegalensis are freshwater wetlands and savanna.

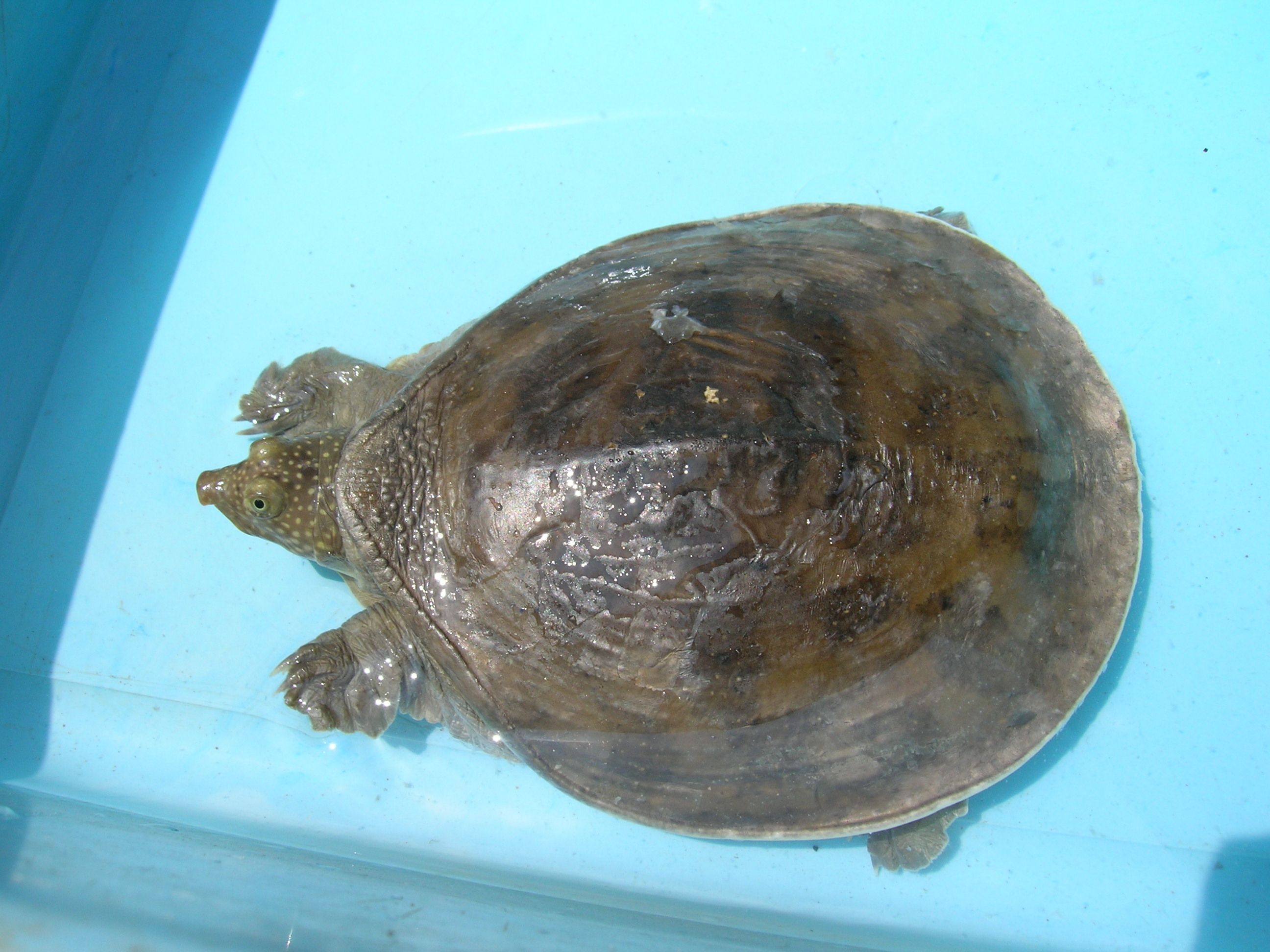
Cyclanorbis senegalensis

== Description ==
C. senegalensis may attain a straight-line carapace length of 35 cm (14 in).

The head is olive, with numerous white dots. The carapace is olive, either uniform or with small dark blotches. Hatchlings have longitudinal rows of small tubercles on the carapace. The plastron is yellowish, clouded with brown. The plastral callosities are finely granular.

== Diet ==
C. senegalensis preys upon tadpoles, other amphibians, and fishes. Large adults of C. senegalensis have jaws strong enough to also eat freshwater clams and snails.
