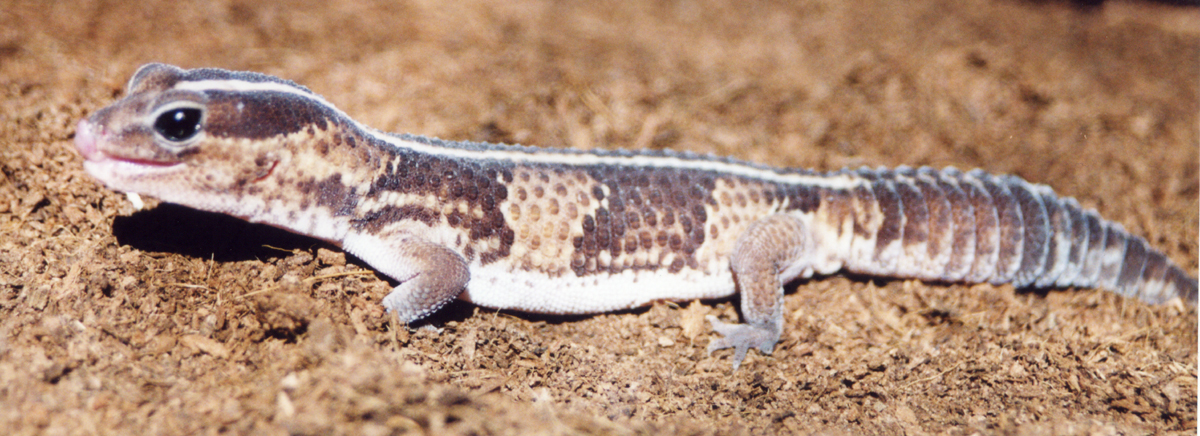

Conservation status
- Least Concern (IUCN 3.1)

Scientific classification
- Kingdom: Animalia
- Phylum: Chordata
- Class: Reptilia
- Order: Squamata
- Suborder: Gekkota
- Family: Eublepharidae
- Genus: Hemitheconyx
- Species: H. caudicinctus

Binomial name
- Hemitheconyx caudicinctus (Duméril, 1851)

= African fat-tailed gecko =

Species of lizard

The African fat-tailed gecko or fat-tail gecko (Hemitheconyx caudicinctus) is a ground-dwelling species of gecko from West Africa and Cameroon.

== Description ==
The African fat-tailed gecko is from the subfamily Eublepharinae. This subfamily has visibly different characteristics from other geckos. They are terrestrial, and have moveable eyelids, vertical pupils, and no adhesive lamellae.

The African fat-tailed gecko is typically around 7–8 inches in length, and up to 75 grams in weight, with females being slightly smaller than males. Normal coloring is brown and tan/beige stripes, with a possible thin white stripe along the length of the back. The underbelly is pale pink or off-white.

The tails of African fat-tailed geckos serve an important purpose to them. Their tails are used for fat storage, so when food is scarce their tails are able to sustain them for a while. Their tails also contribute significantly to their defense from predators. Like many other geckos they are able to drop their tails when necessary. This mechanism helps them make a quick escape from predators. They are also able to regenerate their tails, however it will not resemble the original tail. Instead of having ridges like the original tail, the regenerated tail will be smooth and more bulbous in comparison.

== Distribution and habitat ==
The African fat-tailed gecko is found in West Africa, from Senegal to Nigeria, extending marginally to Central Africa (northern Cameroon). Within their range, these geckos are found in the dry Sahel habitat, as well as in wet or dry savannah habitat. African fat-tailed geckos will spend most of their time in a dark, humid hiding place such as a termite mound.

African fat-tailed geckos have been seen to vary in physical attributes based on their habitat even within specific regions of Africa from size, scale pattern, to color. This allows for them to be able to hide from predators and be successful at repopulating.

== Behavior ==
The African fat-tailed gecko is equipped with the ability to lose its tail when threatened or attacked. If the tail is lost, the new tail will have a more rounded shape, similar to the head. It may not match the body coloration and pattern of the gecko. The tail is also where they store their fat, an important energy reserve. With its tail, an African fat tailed gecko can go days on end without food.

African fat-tailed geckos are reportedly strictly nocturnal, taking shelter from their generally hot and dry environment during the day and emerging at night to forage. They have been found during the day hiding under a variety of cover and will retreat to burrows or hide under rocks or fallen logs.

== Diet ==
African fat-tailed geckos have a primarily insectivorous diet, feeding on various kinds of insects and other invertebrates within their habitats, such as worms, crickets, possibly beetles or cockroaches, etc.

== As pets ==
In the pet trade the African fat-tailed gecko has gained some popularity though is still not as popular as the closely related leopard gecko. With good care, African fat-tailed geckos generally live 15–20 years, although longer may be possible.

== Morphs ==
Through selective breeding, the reptile trade has produced numerous color variants of the African fat-tailed gecko.
