= Natriciteres pembana =

Conservation status
- Least Concern (IUCN 3.1)

Scientific classification
- Kingdom: Animalia
- Phylum: Chordata
- Class: Reptilia
- Order: Squamata
- Suborder: Serpentes
- Family: Colubridae
- Genus: Natriciteres
- Species: N. pembana

Binomial name
- Natriciteres pembana (Loveridge, 1935)

Species of snake

Natriciteres pembana, the variable marsh snake, is a species of natricine snake found on Pemba Island in Tanzania.
