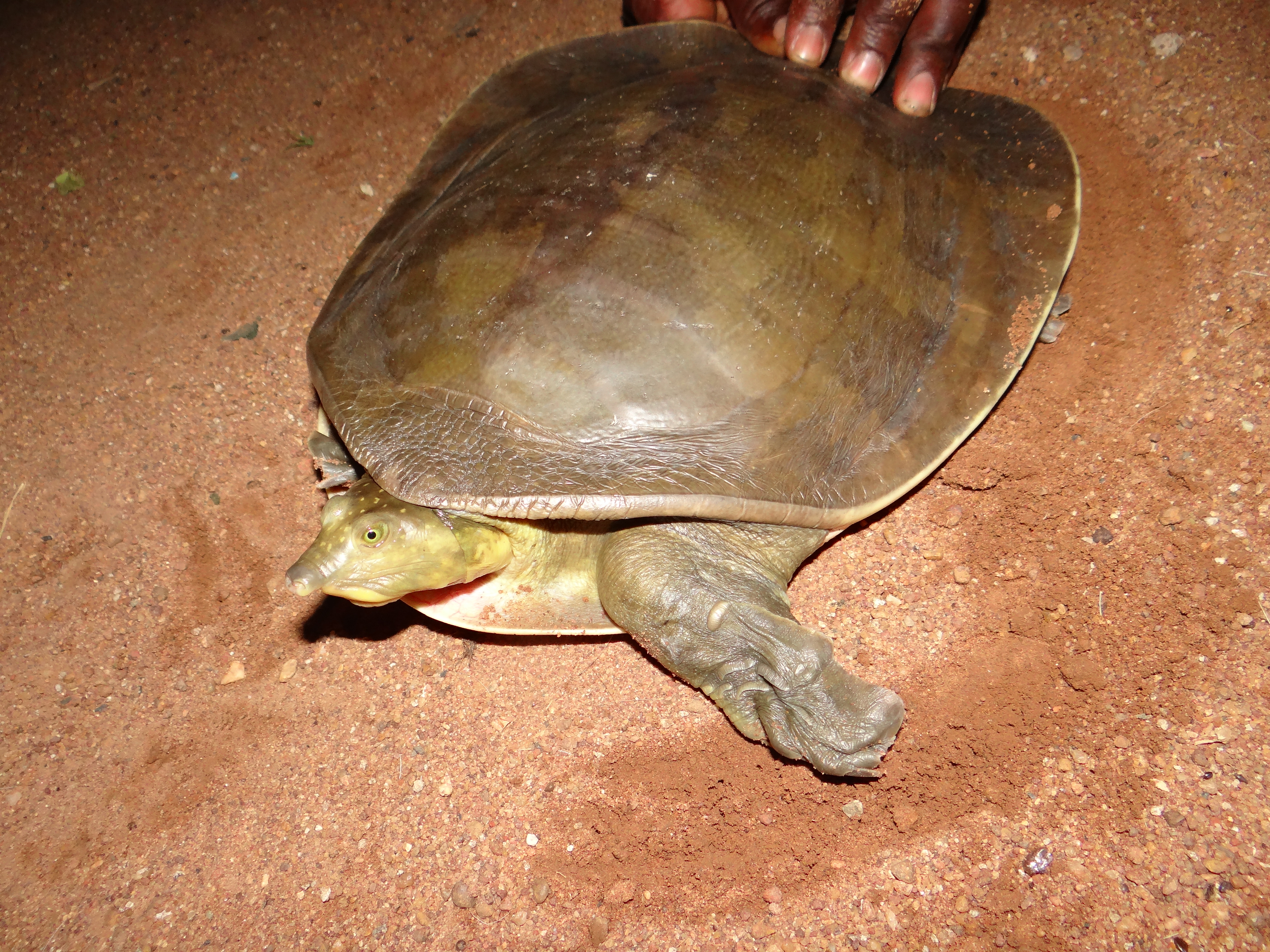
- Senegal flapshell turtle (C. senegalensis)

Scientific classification
- Kingdom: Animalia
- Phylum: Chordata
- Class: Reptilia
- Order: Testudines
- Suborder: Cryptodira
- Family: Trionychidae
- Subfamily: Cyclanorbinae
- Genus: Cyclanorbis; Gray, 1854

Synonyms
- Cryptopus A.M.C. Duméril & Bibron, 1835; Cryptopodus A.H.A. Duméril, 1856 (ex errore); Cyclanosteus Gray, 1856; Tetrathyra Gray, 1865; Baikiea Gray, 1869

= Cyclanorbis =

Cyclanorbis Temporal range: Pliocene to recent, 5.332–0 Ma

Genus of turtles

Cyclanorbis is a genus of softshell turtles in the family Trionychidae. The genus is endemic to Africa.

== Description ==
In the genus Cyclanorbis the plastron has cutaneous flaps, under which the hind legs can be concealed.

== Species ==
The genus Cyclanorbis contains the following extant species:

- Nubian flapshell turtle – Cyclanorbis elegans (Gray, 1869)
- Senegal flapshell turtle – Cyclanorbis senegalensis (A.M.C. Duméril & Bibron, 1835)

One extinct species is also known from fossil remains: Cyclanorbis turkanensis Meylan et al. 1990, from the Pliocene of Kenya.

Nota bene: A binomial authority in parentheses indicates that the species was originally described in a genus other than Cyclanorbis.

== Bibliography ==
- Rhodin, Anders G.J.; van Dijk, Peter Paul; Iverson, John B.; Shaffer, H. Bradley; Roger, Bour (2011-12-31). "Turtles of the world, 2011 update: Annotated checklist of taxonomy, synonymy, distribution and conservation status" (PDF). Chelonian Research Monographs. 6. Archived from the original (PDF) on 2012-01-31.
- Fritz, Uwe; Havaš, Peter (2007-10-31). "Checklist of Chelonians of the World" (PDF). Archived from the original (PDF) on 2011-05-01.
