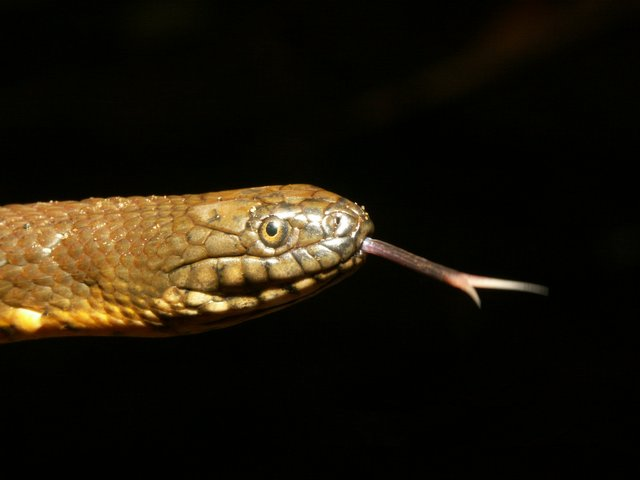

Conservation status
- Least Concern (IUCN 3.1)

Scientific classification
- Kingdom: Animalia
- Phylum: Chordata
- Class: Reptilia
- Order: Squamata
- Suborder: Serpentes
- Family: Colubridae
- Genus: Afronatrix; Rossman & Eberle, 1977
- Species: A. anoscopus

Binomial name
- Afronatrix anoscopus (Cope, 1861)

= African brown water snake =

Species of snake

The African brown water snake (Afronatrix anoscopus) is a species of non-venomous semiaquatic oviparous snake in the subfamily Natricinae of the family Colubridae. The species, which is monotypic in the genus Afronatrix, is native to West Africa. It is commonly found in many West African countries in freshwater swamps, rivers, streams, ponds, and sometimes brackish bodies of water. This species can grow up to 75 cm, and It preys on other aquatic animals like fish, frogs, tadpoles, and frog eggs.

== Geographic distribution ==
Has a patchy distribution across West Africa, with confirmed records in Liberia, Nigeria, Senegal, Sierra Leone, Côte d'Ivoire, Ghana, Guinea, and Cameroon.It is likely present in other West African countries, but limited survey reports have resulted in a lack of records from these areas. It was reported in 2011 that the African brown water snake is the most abundant snake species in the rainforests of southeastern Guinea. The high population density of this species in many West African streams, along with dietary evidence, indicates that this snake plays a key role as a primary fish predator in these ecosystems.

== Diet ==
A. anoscopus eats fish and amphibians. Studies in Nigeria show that it feeds on frogs, including Silurana tropicalis, Ptychadena spp., and Bufomaculatus, as well as fish like cyprinids and mudskippers. Juveniles eat more tadpoles, while adults consume more fish. This change in diet as the snake grows is similar to patterns seen in some European Natricinae like the grass snake. It hunts in freshwater swamps, rivers, and streams, and sometimes in brackish water.

== Size and coloration ==
A. anoscopus can grow up to 75 cm. (29.5 in.). Its most common color is solid brown to reddish with fewer specimens being yellow-brown with black ocular spots. Typical tail length for this snake is 42 cm (17 in), but there have been reports of lengths reaching 60 cm (24 in). Typical snout-vent length is 14.6–45.5 cm (5.7–17.9 in). Males and females do not have significant differences in average total length.

== Morphology ==
The Afronatrix genus, which includes A. anoscopus, is considered unique when compared to other members of the natricine subfamily in that it has lateral keels on its subcaudals. Additionally, it exhibits subocular scales, and will have a minimum of 21 dorsal scale rows. Its hemipenis anatomy has strong similarity to some Asian natricine snakes in that it is only partially bilobed and asymmetrical. This along with biochemical data suggests a close relationship between the two species. Its dentition is described as syncranterian (firmly fused to the jawbone without sockets).

== Habitat use and seasonal movement ==
Primarily inhabits ponds and freshwater rivers in rainforest zones of West Africa. Its habitat use changes with the seasons, likely in response to water availability. During the wet season, when ponds are full, the species is commonly found in these temporary water bodies. However, as ponds dry out in the dry season, many individuals move to freshwater rivers, where water remains available. This seasonal migration helps the snakes access stable food resources, such as fish and frogs, which are abundant in flooded habitats but scarcer in dried out areas.
