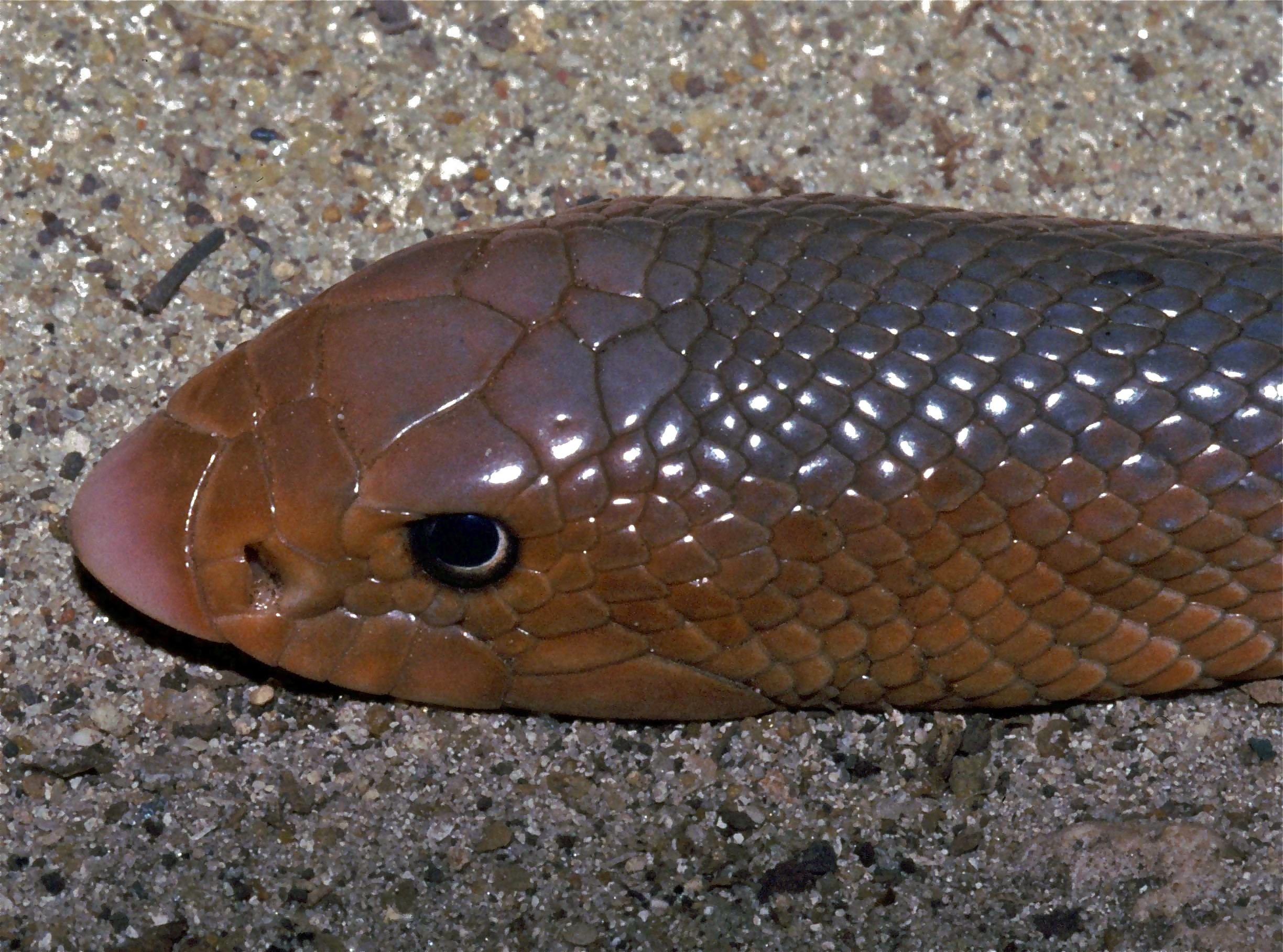
- S. albopunctatus

Scientific classification
- Kingdom: Animalia
- Phylum: Chordata
- Class: Reptilia
- Order: Squamata
- Suborder: Serpentes
- Family: Colubridae
- Subfamily: Colubrinae
- Genus: Scaphiophis; W. Peters, 1870

= Scaphiophis =

Genus of snakes

Scaphiophis is a genus of African snakes in the family Colubridae. Common names include hook-nosed snakes and shovel-nosed snakes.

== Species ==
Two species are recognized as being valid.

- Scaphiophis albopunctatus W. Peters, 1870 - African shovel-nosed snake
- Scaphiophis raffreyi Bocourt, 1875 - Ethiopian hook-nosed snake

== Etymology ==
The specific name, raffreyi, is in honor of French scientific collector Achille Raffray.
