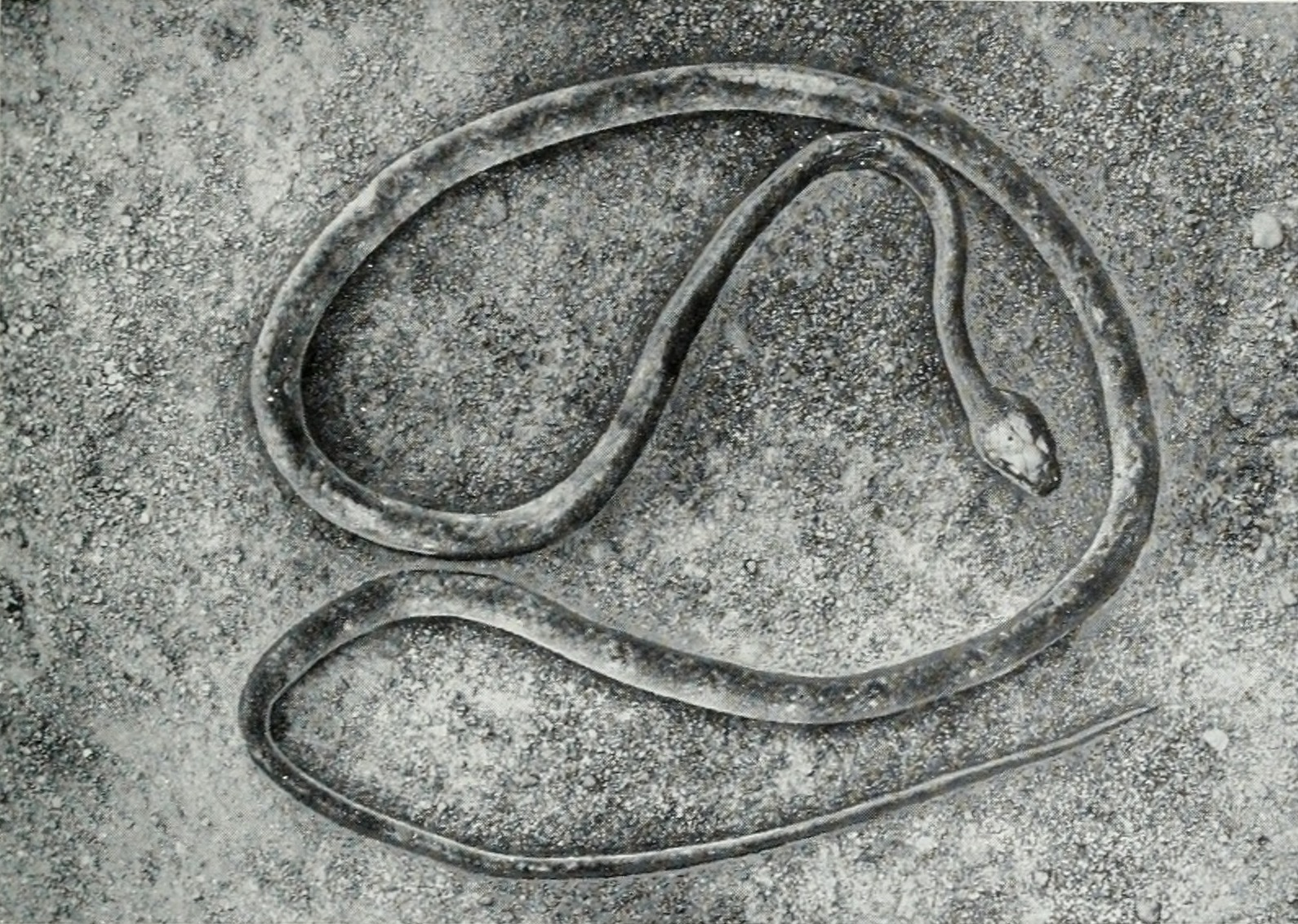
- Adult colouration pattern

Conservation status
- Least Concern (IUCN 3.1)

Scientific classification
- Kingdom: Animalia
- Phylum: Chordata
- Class: Reptilia
- Order: Squamata
- Suborder: Serpentes
- Family: Colubridae
- Genus: Toxicodryas
- Species: T. pulverulenta

Binomial name
- Toxicodryas pulverulenta (Fischer, 1856)

Synonyms
- Dipsas pulverulenta Fischer, 1856; Dipsadomorphus pulverulentus — Sternfeld, 1917; Boiga pulverulenta — Schmidt, 1923; Toxicodryas pulverulenta — J.-F. Trape & Roux-Estève, 1995

= Toxicodryas pulverulenta =

Species of snake

Toxicodryas pulverulenta, commonly known as Fischer's cat snake, Fischer's tree snake, and the powdered tree snake, is a species of rear-fanged venomous snake in the family Colubridae. The species is native to Sub-Saharan Africa.

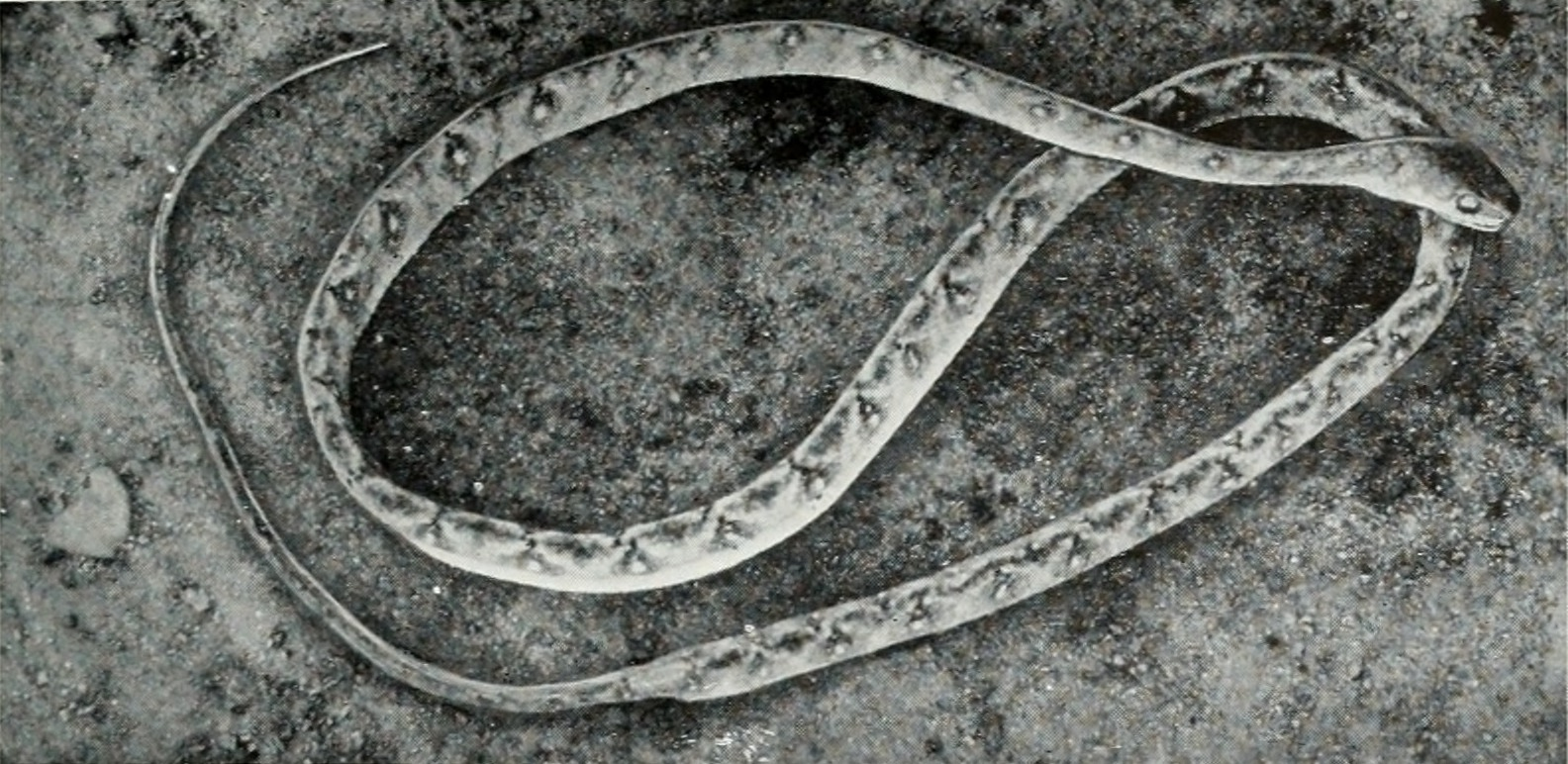
Juvenile colouration pattern

== Etymology ==
The specific name, pulverulenta, means "dusted" or "powdery" in Latin. The common names, Fischer's cat snake and Fischer's tree snake, are in honour of German herpetologist Johann Gustav Fischer, who originally described this snake as a species new to science.

== Geographic range ==
T. pulverulenta is found in Angola, Benin, Cameroon, Central African Republic, Democratic Republic of the Congo, Gabon, Ghana, Guinea, Ivory Coast, Liberia, Nigeria, Republic of the Congo, São Tomé and Príncipe, Sierra Leone, South Sudan, Togo, and Uganda.

== Habitat ==
The preferred natural habitats of T. pulverulenta are forest and savanna, at altitudes from sea level to 1,050 m (3,440 ft), but it has also been found in palm plantations.

== Description ==
Smaller than other species in its genus, T. pulverulenta does not exceed one metre (40 inches) in snout-to-vent length (SVL). Dorsally, it is buff to pale brown. Ventrally, it is yellow, powdered with brown. Juveniles have a series of brown blotches on the flanks, each blotch enclosing a white area.

== Diet ==
T. pulverulenta preys upon lizards and rodents.

== Behaviour ==
T. pulverulenta is nocturnal and arboreal.

== Reproduction ==
T. pulverulenta is oviparous.
