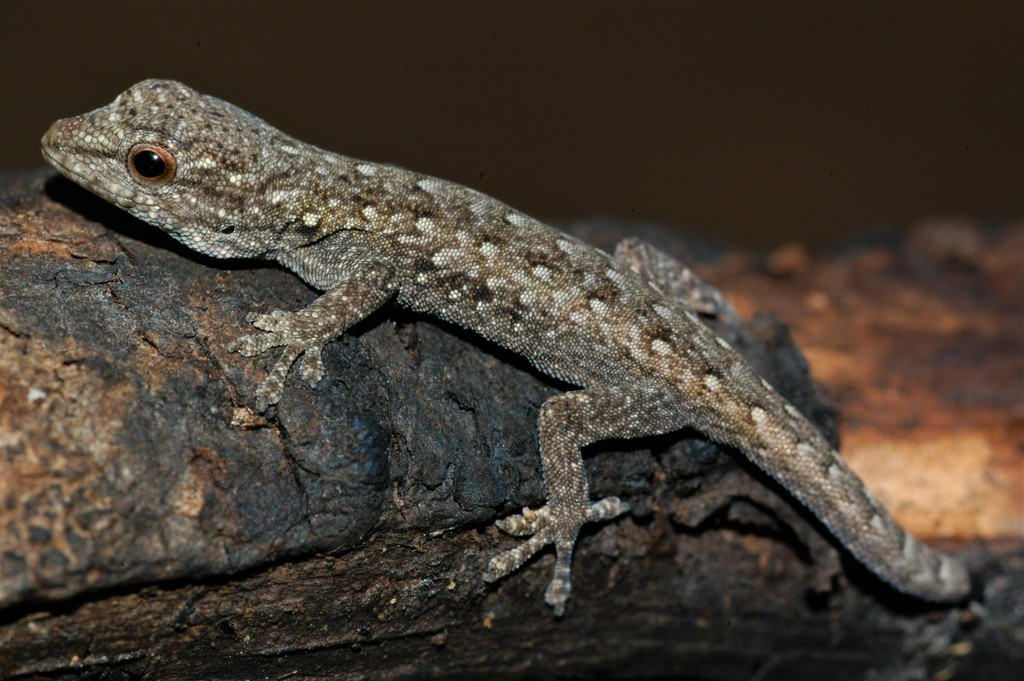

Conservation status
- Least Concern (IUCN 3.1)

Scientific classification
- Kingdom: Animalia
- Phylum: Chordata
- Class: Reptilia
- Order: Squamata
- Suborder: Gekkota
- Family: Gekkonidae
- Genus: Lygodactylus
- Species: L. gutturalis

Binomial name
- Lygodactylus gutturalis (Bocage, 1873)

Subspecies
- L. g. dysmicus Perret, 1963; L. g. gutturalis (Bocage, 1873); L. g. paurospilus Laurent, 1952

Synonyms
- Hemidactylus gutturalis; Lygodactylus picturatus gutturalis; Lygodactylus dysmicus; Lygodactylus angularis paurospilus

= Lygodactylus gutturalis =

Species of lizard

Lygodactylus gutturalis, also known as the Uganda dwarf gecko or chevron-throated dwarf gecko, is a species of gecko. It is widely distributed in Sub-Saharan Africa from near the Equator northward. Subspecies Lygodactylus gutturalis dysmicus is endemic to Cameroon, and subspecies Lygodactylus gutturalis paurospilus to Tanzania.
