= Pseudohaje =

Scientific classification
- Domain: Eukaryota
- Kingdom: Animalia
- Phylum: Chordata
- Class: Reptilia
- Order: Squamata
- Suborder: Serpentes
- Family: Elapidae
- Genus: Pseudohaje; Günther, 1858

Species
- See text.

Genus of snakes

Pseudohaje is a genus of venomous African elapid snakes, commonly called tree cobras or forest cobras because of their arboreal lifestyle. Their ability to produce a hood is limited to a slight flattening of the neck.

== Characteristics ==
Tree cobras have proportionally larger eyes compared to Naja species, smaller fangs, and smaller bone structures. Members were formerly categorized as Naja, but anatomical analysis of midbody scale rows distinguished them as a separate taxon.

== Species ==
Two species are recognized as valid.

- Pseudohaje goldii (Boulenger, 1895) – Goldie's tree cobra
- Pseudohaje nigra Günther, 1858 – black tree cobra

== See also ==
- Pseudonaja
