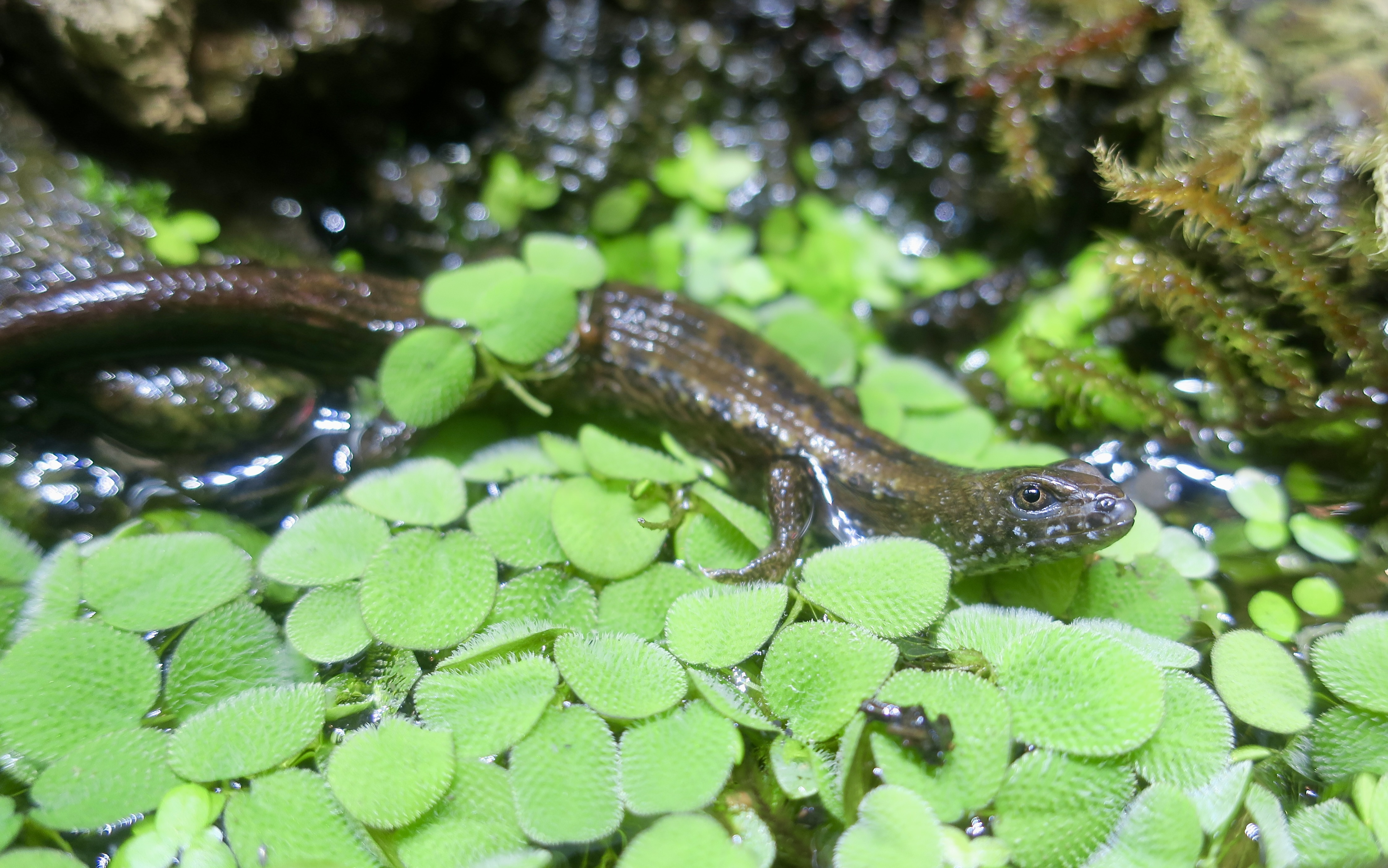

Conservation status
- Least Concern (IUCN 3.1)

Scientific classification
- Kingdom: Animalia
- Phylum: Chordata
- Class: Reptilia
- Order: Squamata
- Family: Scincidae
- Genus: Cophoscincopus
- Species: C. greeri

Binomial name
- Cophoscincopus greeri Böhme, Schmitz, & Ziegler, 2000

= Cophoscincopus greeri =

Species of lizard

Cophoscincopus greeri is a species of lizard in the family Scincidae. It is found in western Africa.

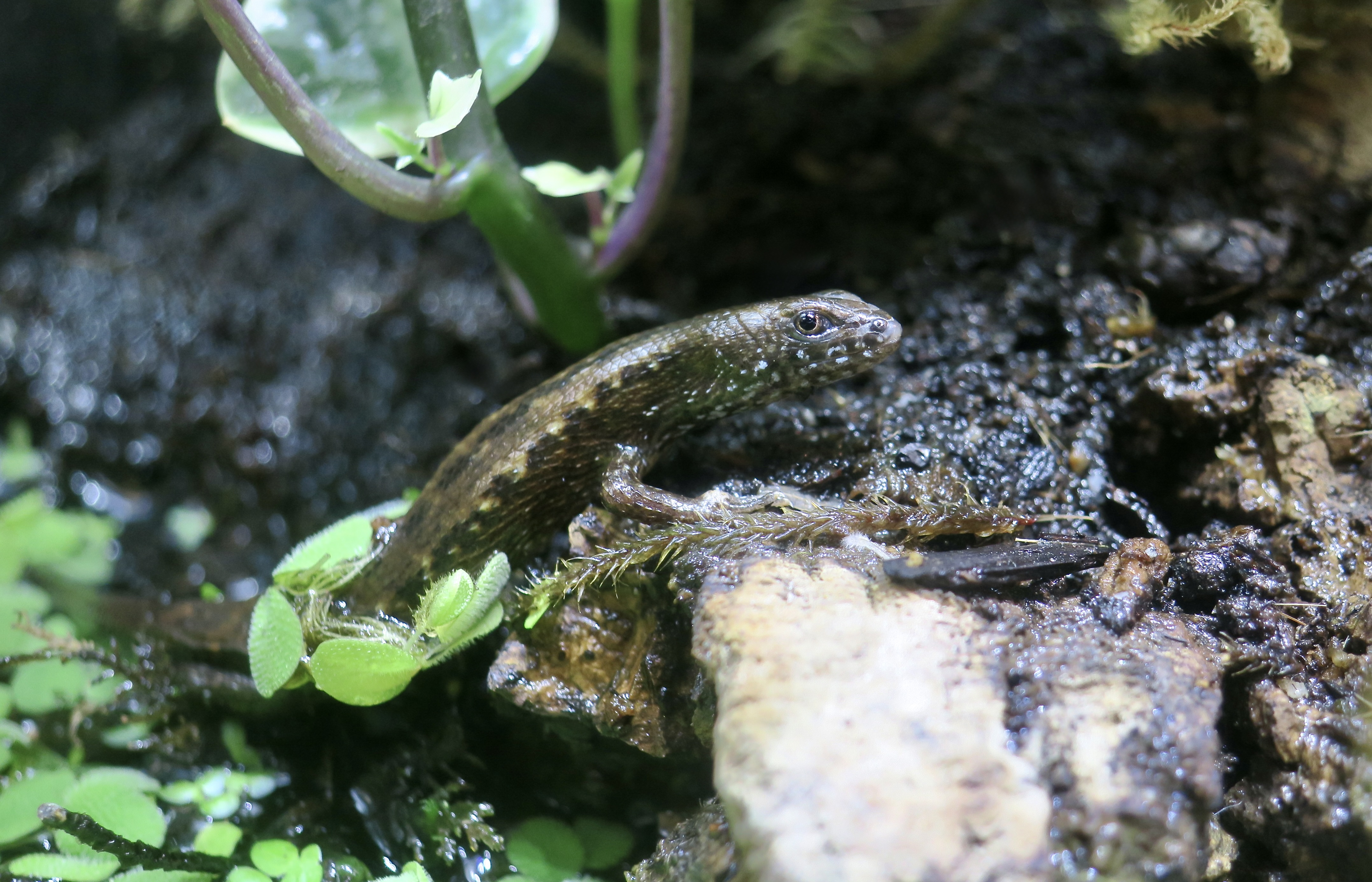
At a reptile store in Nevada.

== Etymology ==
The specific name, greeri, is in honor of Australian herpetologist Allen Eddy Greer.
