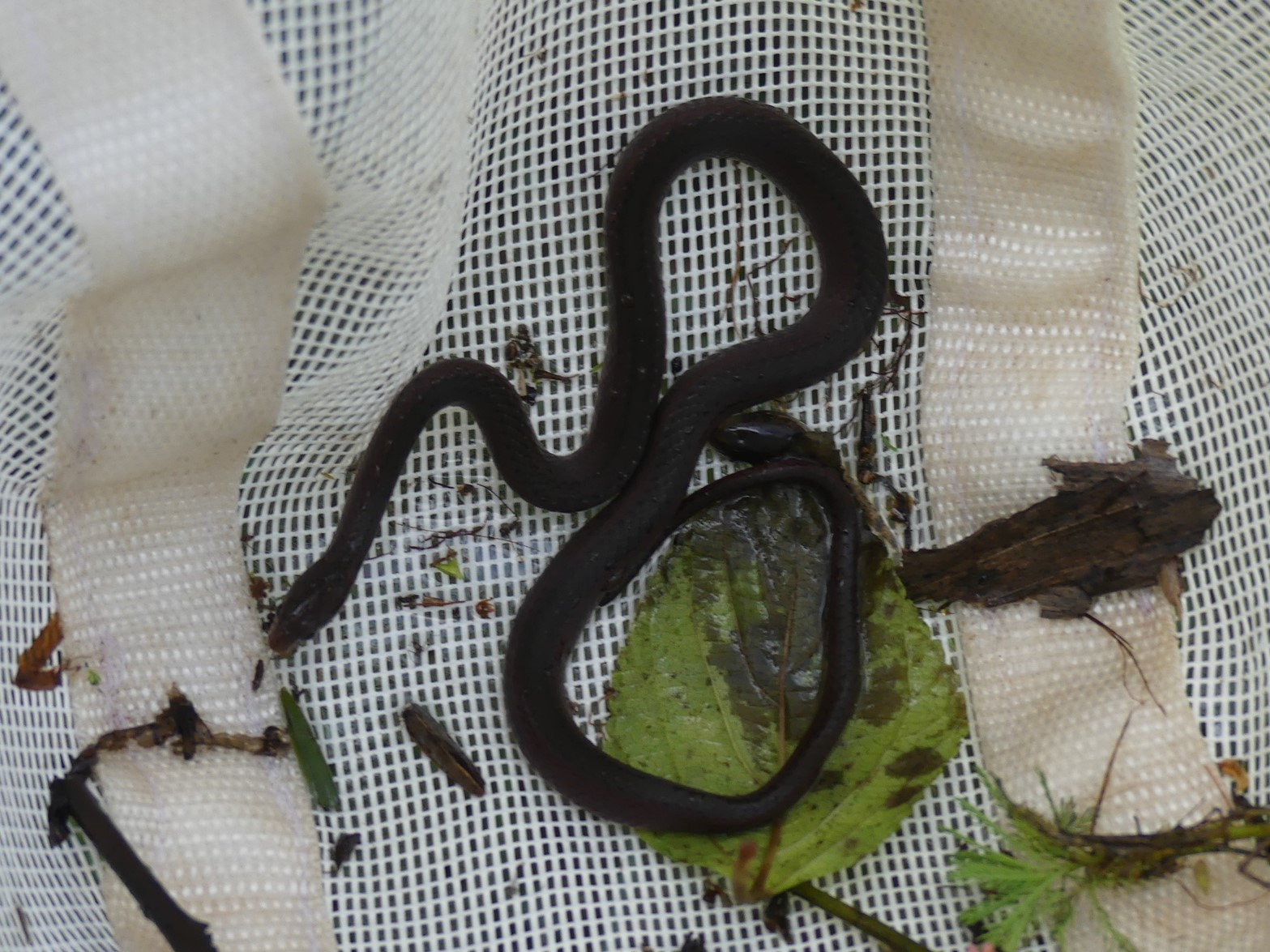
- Natriciteres olivacea

Scientific classification
- Kingdom: Animalia
- Phylum: Chordata
- Class: Reptilia
- Order: Squamata
- Suborder: Serpentes
- Family: Colubridae
- Subfamily: Natricinae
- Genus: Natriciteres; Loveridge, 1953

= Natriciteres =

Genus of snakes

Natriciteres is a genus of snakes in the subfamily Natricinae of the family Colubridae. The genus is endemic to Sub-Saharan Africa.

== Species ==
The following six species are recognized as being valid.

- Natriciteres bipostocularis Broadley, 1962 – southwestern forest marsh snake
- Natriciteres fuliginoides (Günther, 1858) – collared marsh snake
- Natriciteres olivacea (W. Peters, 1854) – olive marsh snake
- Natriciteres pembana (Loveridge, 1935) – variable marsh snake
- Natriciteres sylvatica Broadley, 1966 – forest marsh snake
- Natriciteres variegata (W. Peters, 1861) – variable marsh snake

Nota bene: A binomial authority in parentheses indicates that the species was originally described in a genus other than Natriciteres.
