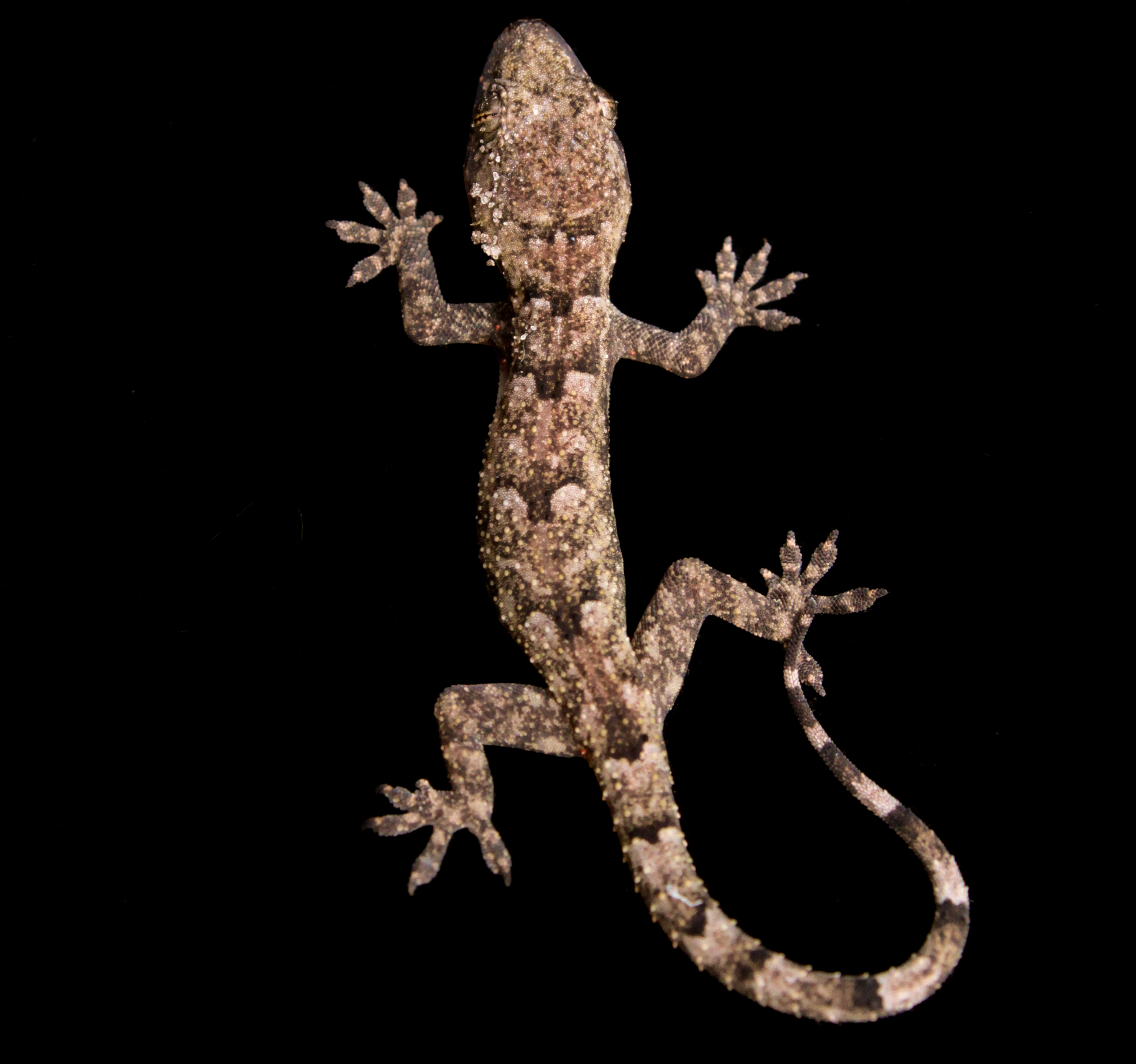

Conservation status
- Least Concern (IUCN 3.1)

Scientific classification
- Kingdom: Animalia
- Phylum: Chordata
- Class: Reptilia
- Order: Squamata
- Suborder: Gekkota
- Family: Gekkonidae
- Genus: Hemidactylus
- Species: H. muriceus

Binomial name
- Hemidactylus muriceus Peters, 1870

Synonyms
- Hemidactylus intestinalis Werner, 1897

= Guinea leaf-toed gecko =

Species of lizard

The Guinea leaf-toed gecko (Hemidactylus muriceus) is a species of gecko. It is found in West Africa between Guinea in the west and Nigeria east, and further east and south in Central Africa, in Cameroon, Gabon, and the Democratic Republic of the Congo. The Reptile Database also includes the Central African Republic as possible extension of its range.
