= Cophoscincopus simulans =

Conservation status
- Least Concern (IUCN 3.1)

Scientific classification
- Kingdom: Animalia
- Phylum: Chordata
- Class: Reptilia
- Order: Squamata
- Family: Scincidae
- Genus: Cophoscincopus
- Species: C. simulans

Binomial name
- Cophoscincopus simulans (Vaillant, 1884)

Species of lizard

Cophoscincopus simulans is a species of lizard in the family Scincidae. It is found in western Africa.
