= Cophoscincopus =

Scientific classification
- Kingdom: Animalia
- Phylum: Chordata
- Class: Reptilia
- Order: Squamata
- Family: Scincidae
- Subfamily: Eugongylinae
- Genus: Cophoscincopus; Mertens, 1934

Genus of lizards

Cophoscincopus (common name: keeled water skinks) is a genus of skinks, lizards in the family Scincidae. The genus is endemic to West Africa. As suggested by the common name, species in the genus Cophoscincopus are semi-aquatic.

== Species ==
There are four recognized species in the genus Cophoscincopus.

- Cophoscincopus durus (Cope, 1862)
- Cophoscincopus greeri Böhme, Schmitz & Ziegler, 2000
- Cophoscincopus senegalensis J.-F. Trape, Mediannikov & S. Trape, 2012
- Cophoscincopus simulans (Vaillant, 1884)

Nota bene: A binomial authority in parentheses indicates that the species was originally described in a genus other than Cophoscincopus.
