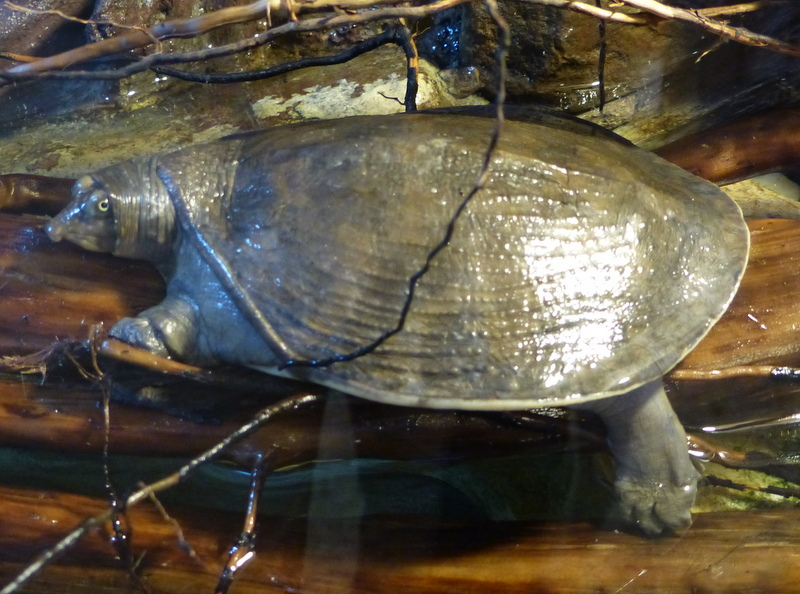

Conservation status
- Critically Endangered (IUCN 3.1)
- CITES Appendix II (CITES)

Scientific classification
- Kingdom: Animalia
- Phylum: Chordata
- Class: Reptilia
- Order: Testudines
- Suborder: Cryptodira
- Family: Trionychidae
- Genus: Cyclanorbis
- Species: C. elegans

Binomial name
- Cyclanorbis elegans (Gray, 1869)

Synonyms
- Baikiea elegans Gray, 1869; Cyclanorbis elegans – Boulenger, 1889; Cyclanorbis oligotylus Siebenrock, 1902

= Nubian flapshell turtle =

Species of turtle

The Nubian flapshell turtle or Nubian soft-shelled turtle (Cyclanorbis elegans) is one of two species of softshell turtle in the genus Cyclanorbis of the Trionychidae family. It is thought to have ranged from West Africa east through Central Africa to South Sudan, although it has been extirpated from the vast majority of its range.

== Distribution ==
Historically, Cyclanorbis elegans was found over a wide range, spanning from West Africa (Benin, Ghana, Nigeria, Togo) east through Central African Republic, Chad, Ethiopia and Sudan. In 2017, a lone population was found in the White Nile wetlands of South Sudan by Prof. Luca Luiselli and his team; this discovery was publicized in a 2019 paper. In 2021, another population was found along the same wetlands, but in northern Uganda (near the border with South Sudan); the species had not previously been recorded in this area.

On the biodiversity database iNaturalist, several "research-grade" sightings—i.e., with clear photographic evidence and GPS coordinates—of C. elegans have been documented between April 2022 and May 2024; the bulk of these observations took place in and around Salamat, Chad, while others have occurred in West Gonja, Ghana, and Tangúieta, Benin.

== Description ==
The Nubian flapshell turtle can reach a length of up to 70 cm (27.5 in).

== Conservation ==
The Nubian flapshell turtle's habitat is often located in very politically-hostile and tumultuous areas, which results in habitat loss due to situations surrounding local skirmishes, land mines and a greater need for water by local armed forces and civilians. In addition, especially during times of war, the turtles may be hunted as bushmeat. Some Chinese expatriates in Africa are known to offer rather large sums of money to poorer fishermen in exchange for catching these turtles, as they are valued for both food and Chinese medicine. Some of the captured turtles are then further exported to Asia for "fresh" availability. Bari fishermen, in South Sudan, have extensive cultural knowledge of the Nubian flapshell turtle, including natural history, lifestyle and reproductive patterns, and nesting sites, which may prove useful in future and ongoing conservation efforts of the species.
