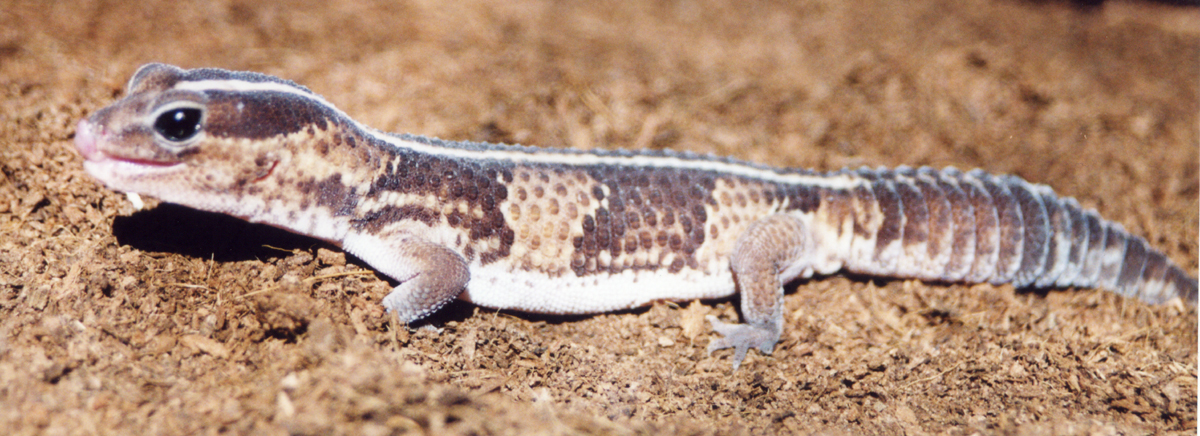
- African fat-tailed gecko (Hemitheconyx caudicinctus)

Scientific classification
- Kingdom: Animalia
- Phylum: Chordata
- Class: Reptilia
- Order: Squamata
- Suborder: Gekkota
- Family: Eublepharidae
- Genus: Hemitheconyx; Stejneger, 1893

= Hemitheconyx =

Genus of lizards

Hemitheconyx is a genus of geckos. Both species are found in Africa. They are known as fat-tailed geckos and often resemble leopard geckos. In wild populations of Hemitheconyx, females have been observed to select nesting areas with a temperature of 34.2 degrees Celsius near the upper pivotal temperature for its temperature-dependent sex determination system.

== Species ==
There are two recognized species in the genus Hemitheconyx:

- Hemitheconyx caudicinctus (Duméril, 1851) – (African) fat-tailed gecko
- Hemitheconyx taylori Parker, 1930 – Taylor's fat-tail(ed) gecko
