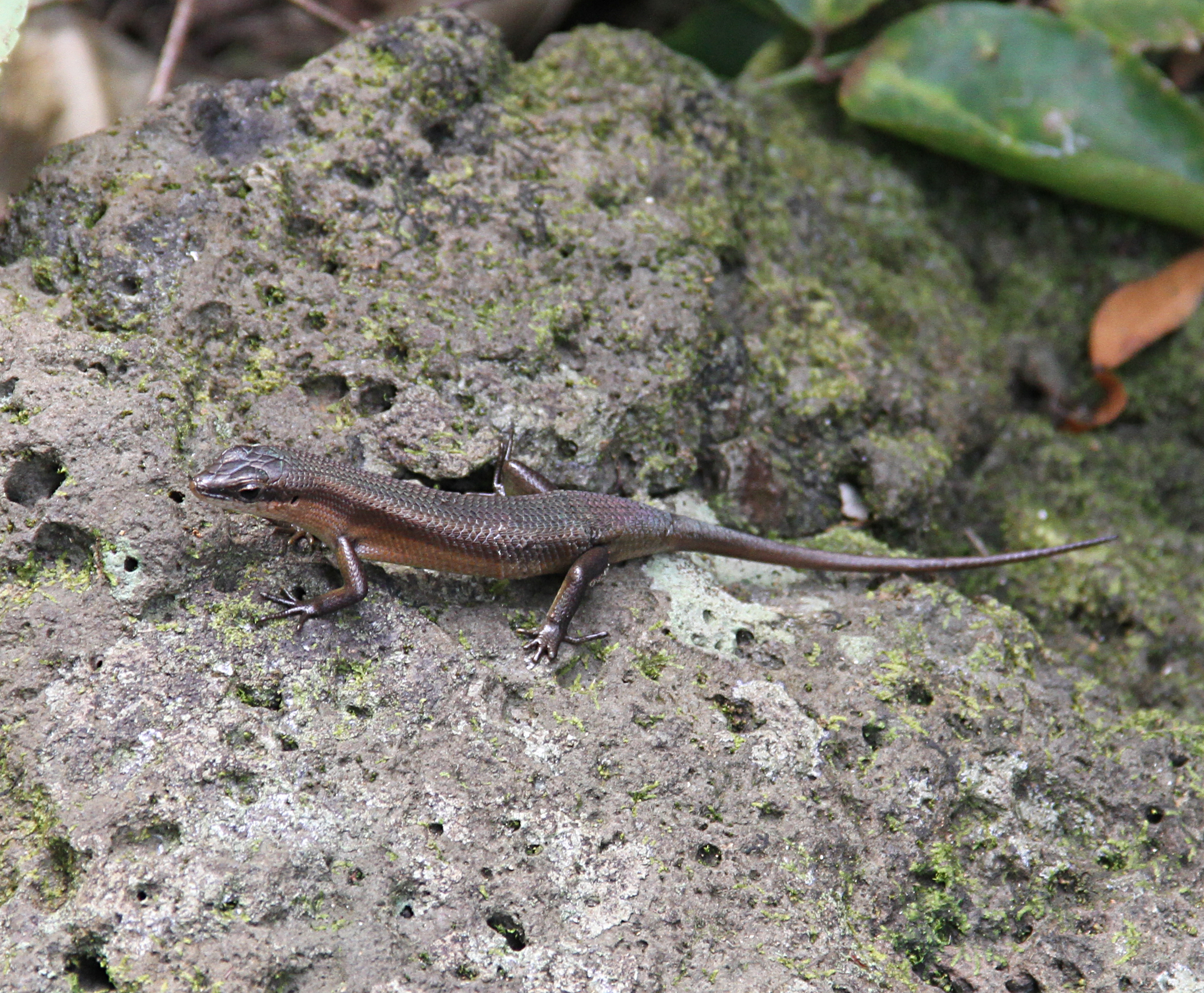

Scientific classification
- Domain: Eukaryota
- Kingdom: Animalia
- Phylum: Chordata
- Class: Reptilia
- Order: Squamata
- Family: Scincidae
- Genus: Trachylepis
- Species: T. polytropis

Binomial name
- Trachylepis polytropis (Boulenger, 1903)

= Trachylepis polytropis =

Species of lizard

The tropical mabuya (Trachylepis polytropis) is a species of skink found in Africa.
