= Natriciteres variegata =

Conservation status
- Least Concern (IUCN 3.1)

Scientific classification
- Kingdom: Animalia
- Phylum: Chordata
- Class: Reptilia
- Order: Squamata
- Suborder: Serpentes
- Family: Colubridae
- Genus: Natriciteres
- Species: N. variegata

Binomial name
- Natriciteres variegata (Peters, 1861)

Species of snake

Natriciteres variegata, the variable marsh snake, is a species of natricine snake found in Guinea, Equatorial Guinea, Ghana, Benin, Togo, Ivory Coast, Nigeria, Cameroon, Central African Republic, Democratic Republic of the Congo, Gabon, Sierra Leone, Burkina Faso, South Sudan, Sudan, and Liberia.
