= Black tree cobra =

Conservation status
- Least Concern (IUCN 3.1)

Scientific classification
- Kingdom: Animalia
- Phylum: Chordata
- Class: Reptilia
- Order: Squamata
- Suborder: Serpentes
- Family: Elapidae
- Genus: Pseudohaje
- Species: P. nigra

Binomial name
- Pseudohaje nigra Günther, 1858

Synonyms
- Pseudohaje nigra Günther, 1858; Naia guentheri Boulenger, 1896; Pseudohaje guentheri — Bogert, 1942; Pseudohaje nigra — Laurent, 1954

Species of snake

The black tree cobra (Pseudohaje nigra) is a species of venomous tree cobra found in central and western Africa. This species is one of the two tree cobras in Africa, the other being Goldie's tree cobra (Pseudohaje goldii).

== Distribution and habitat ==
P. nigra is found in Ghana, Guinea, Ivory Coast, Liberia, Nigeria, Sierra Leone, and Togo.

== Description ==
P. nigra is black dorsally, and brown ventrally. Adults may attain a total length (including tail) of 2.13 m (7.0 ft).
