= Johann Gustav Fischer =

German herpetologist

Johann Gustav Fischer (1 March 1819, Hamburg – 27 January 1889) was a German herpetologist.

He served as an instructor at the Johanneum in Hamburg, and was associated with the city's Naturhistorisches Museum, working extensively with its herpetological and ichthyological collections. He was the binomial author of numerous herpetological species, and has several species named in his honor:

- "Fischer's cat snake" (Toxicodryas pulverulenta), 1856.
- "Fischer's chameleon" (Kinyongia fischeri), described by Anton Reichenow in 1887.
- "Fischer's dwarf gecko" (Lygodactylus fischeri), described by George Albert Boulenger in 1890.
- "Fischer’s snail-eating snake" (Tropidodipsas fischeri), described by George Albert Boulenger in 1894.
- "Fischer's thick-toed gecko" (Pachydactylus laevigatus), 1888.

In the field of ichthyology, he described the genera Sclerocottus (Cottidae) and Gymnelichthys (Zoarcidae).

== Published works ==
Many of his scientific papers were published in the "Jahrbuch der Hamburgischen Wissenschaftlichen Anstalten", the "Abhandlungen aus dem Gebiete der Naturwissenschaften herausgegeben vom Naturwissenschaftlichen Verein" and the "Verhandlungen des Naturwissenschaftlichen Vereins von Hamburg-Altona". The following are some of Fischer's principal written efforts:

- Amphibiorum nudorum neurologiae specimen primum, 1843.
- Die gehirnnerven der saurier anatomisch untersucht, 1852 – Anatomical studies involving the cranial nerves of saurians.
- Anatomische abhandlungen über die perennibranchiaten und derotremen, 1864 – Anatomical notes on the perennibranchiate and derotreme.
- Ichthyologische und herpetologische Bemerkungen, 1885 – Ichthyological and herpetological comments.
- Die familie der seeschlangen systematisch beschrieben, 1886 – Family of sea snakes systematically described.
