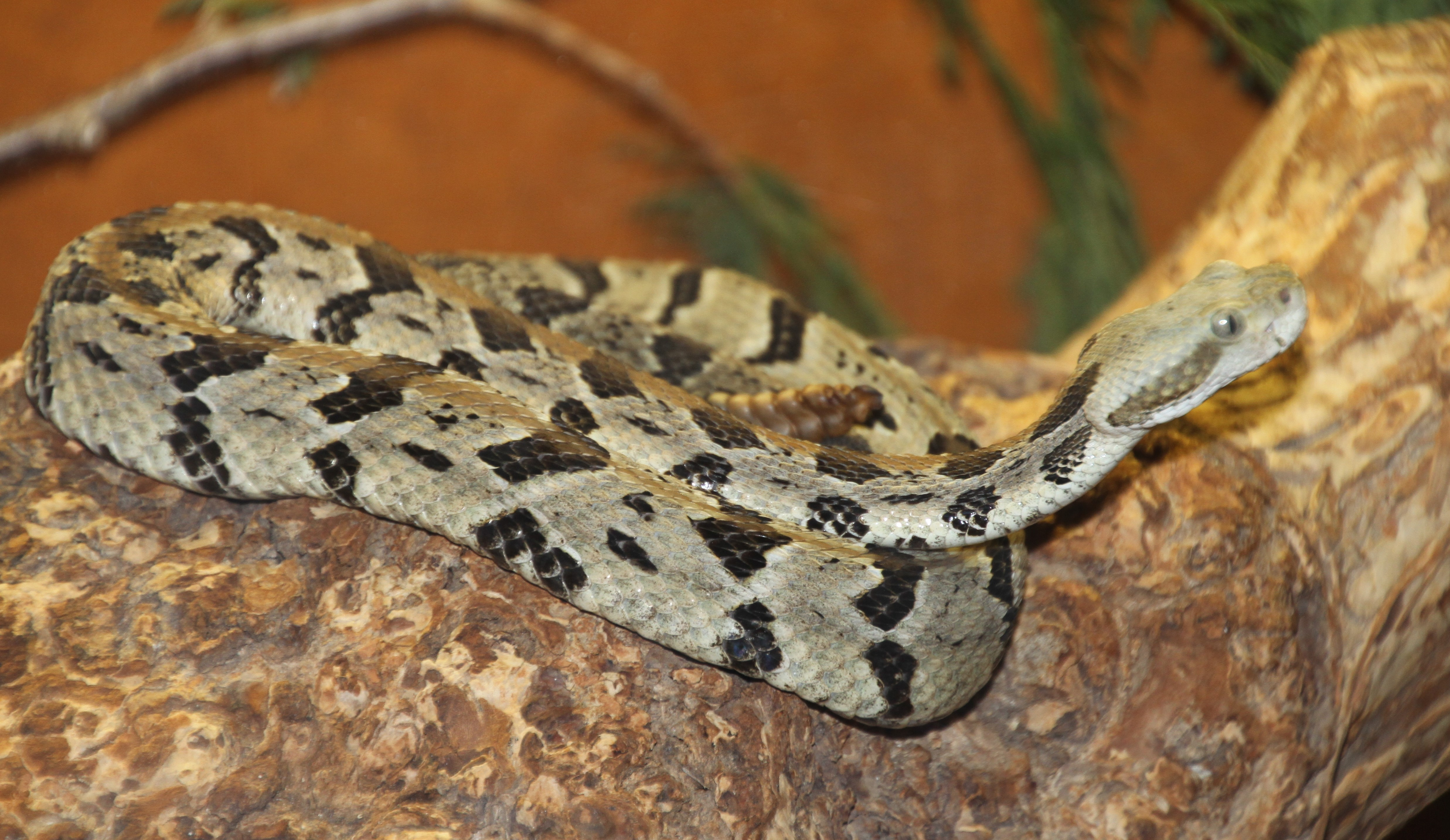
- Crotalus horridus, the timber rattlesnake

Scientific classification
- Kingdom: Animalia
- Phylum: Chordata
- Class: Reptilia
- Order: Squamata
- Suborder: Serpentes
- Family: Viperidae
- Subfamily: Crotalinae
- Genus: Crotalus; Linnaeus, 1758

Synonyms
- List: Crotalus Linnaeus, 1758; Crotalophorus Houttuyn, 1764; Caudisona Laurenti, 1768; Crotalinus Rafinesque, 1815; Crotalurus Rafinesque, 1820; Crotulurus Rafinesque, 1820; Uropsophus Wagler, 1830; Urocrotalon Fitzinger, 1843; Aploaspis Cope, 1867; Aechmophrys Coues In Wheeler, 1875; Haploaspis Cope, 1883; Paracrotalus Reuss, 1930

Audio
- Rattlesnake rattling

= Crotalus =

Genus of snakes

Crotalus is a genus of pit vipers, commonly known as rattlesnakes or rattlers, in the family Viperidae. The genus is found only in the Americas from southern Canada to northern Argentina. The generic name Crotalus is derived from the Greek word κρόταλον krótalοn, which means "rattle" or "castanet", and refers to the rattle on the end of the tail, which makes this group (genera Crotalus and Sistrurus) so distinctive. As of July 2023, 44 to 53 species are recognized as valid.

== Description ==
Members of the genus Crotalus range in size from only 50–70 cm (20–28 in) (C. intermedius, C. pricei), to over 150 cm (59 in) (eastern and western diamondback rattlesnakes). In general, adult males are slightly larger than females. Compared to most snakes, they are heavy-bodied, although some African vipers are much thicker. Most forms are easily recognized by the characteristic rattle on the end of their tails, although a few island populations form exceptions to this rule: C. catalinensis has lost its rattle entirely, Crotalus lorenzoensis usually has no rattle, and both Crotalus ruber lucasensis and Crotalus estebanensis exhibit a tendency for rattle loss. The rattle may also be lacking in any species due to a congenital abnormality.

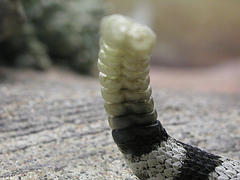
The rattle of a western diamondback rattlesnake (note the black and white colour at the base)

The rattle consists of a series of loosely interlocking hollow shells, each of which was at one point the scale covering the tip of the tail. In most other snakes, the tail tip, or terminal spine, is cone-shaped, hardly any thicker than the rest of the skin, and is shed along with it at each successive molt. In this case, the end scale, or "button", is much thicker and shaped like a bulb, with one or two annular constrictions to prevent it from falling off. Before each molt, a new button will have developed inside the last one and before the skin is shed off its body, the tip of the new button shrinks, then loosening the shell of the previous one. This process continues so the succession of molts produces an appendage consisting of a number of interlocking segments that make an audible noise when vibrated. Since younger specimens may shed several times in a year at a frequency that depends on their environment and how much they eat, every time adding a new segment to the rattle, the number of segments is a function of more than solely the age of the snake. In theory, the rattle could become very long indeed, but in practice, the older segments tend to wear out and fall off. How quickly this happens depends on the snake's environment, but end segments tend to break off after the rattle becomes about six or seven segments long; nonetheless, finding specimens with as many as a dozen segments is not uncommon— and in captive specimens, as many as 29 segments have been documented.

== Distribution and habitat ==
The genus Crotalus is found in the Americas from southern Canada to central Argentina.

== Behavior ==
No species of Crotalus is considered aggressive; when threatened, most retreat quickly, but most species defend themselves readily when cornered.

There is no consensus in the available literature about how far rattlesnakes can strike, with estimates ranging from one-third to the entire body length of the rattlesnake. Strike distance depends not just on the snake's size, but also on many other factors, including its species, the position of its body, and its degree of agitation. This is compounded by a further lack of consensus as to the location on the anchor coil of the snake from where a strike should be measured. They rarely strike further than half of their body length, and almost never more than three-fourths, but trusting such values is unwise if only because it is not feasible to accurately judge the length of a coiled snake.

== Feeding ==
The diets of species of Crotalus generally consist of vertebrates, although many invertebrate species are also consumed. Smaller species feed mainly on lizards, while larger species start by feeding on lizards as juveniles and then switch to preying mainly on mammals as adults. Prey items more frequently taken include rabbits, ground squirrels such as prairie dogs, tree squirrels, chipmunks, gophers, and rats and mice, while those less frequently taken include birds, lizards, snakes and amphibians. Cannibalism has been reported in a number of different species. Individuals that feed on rodents usually release their prey after a strike to avoid their teeth, and these snakes evidently can discriminate between trails left by prey that has or has not been envenomated.

== Predators ==
For all species of Crotalus, the most significant threats come from people, but they also face many natural enemies. These include other snakes, such as kingsnakes (Lampropeltis), coachwhips (Masticophis), indigo snakes (Drymarchon), and racers (Coluber); birds, such as hawks, eagles, owls, roadrunners and ravens; and mammals, such as cats, coyotes, foxes, wildcats, badgers, skunks and pigs. Certain species of birds frequently prey on these snakes, but this is not without risk. Two cases were reported in which dead hawks found near venomous snakes had suffered hemorrhage and gangrenous necrosis due to snakebite.

== Reproduction ==
The genus Crotalus is ovoviviparous, giving birth to live young. The basic lifecycle of many Nearctic species has been known for quite some time. Females at an age of 26 months undergo vitellogenesis as they enter their third hibernation, mate the following spring, and give birth later in September or October.

Several variations to this basic cycle occur. In North America, the females of some species store sperm in their oviducts for at least eight months, and the males (all species of which undergo spermatogenesis during the summer) store sperm in the vas deferens for at least a year. Thus, species that store sperm for a shorter duration mate in the spring and store sperm in the vas deferens, while those that do so for a longer duration mate in the fall and store sperm in the oviduct over the winter, after which fertilization occurs the following spring. In addition, species that occur further north, where weather is colder during much of the year and the feeding and growing season is short, may reproduce only every other year or less. Those found in central and southern Mexico or the tropics have reproductive cycles that correspond mostly with the rainy season.

== Venom ==
Two main hemotoxic effects are caused by rattlesnake venom. First, zinc-containing metalloproteases act upon capillary endothelial cells to inhibit platelet aggregation and hemorrhage. Second, the platelet antagonist crotalin creates a severe bleeding effect as it binds to the surface proteins, blocking aggregation.

Neurotoxic effects may also be caused by rattlesnake venom. These effects vary by species, and within species by population.

== Species ==
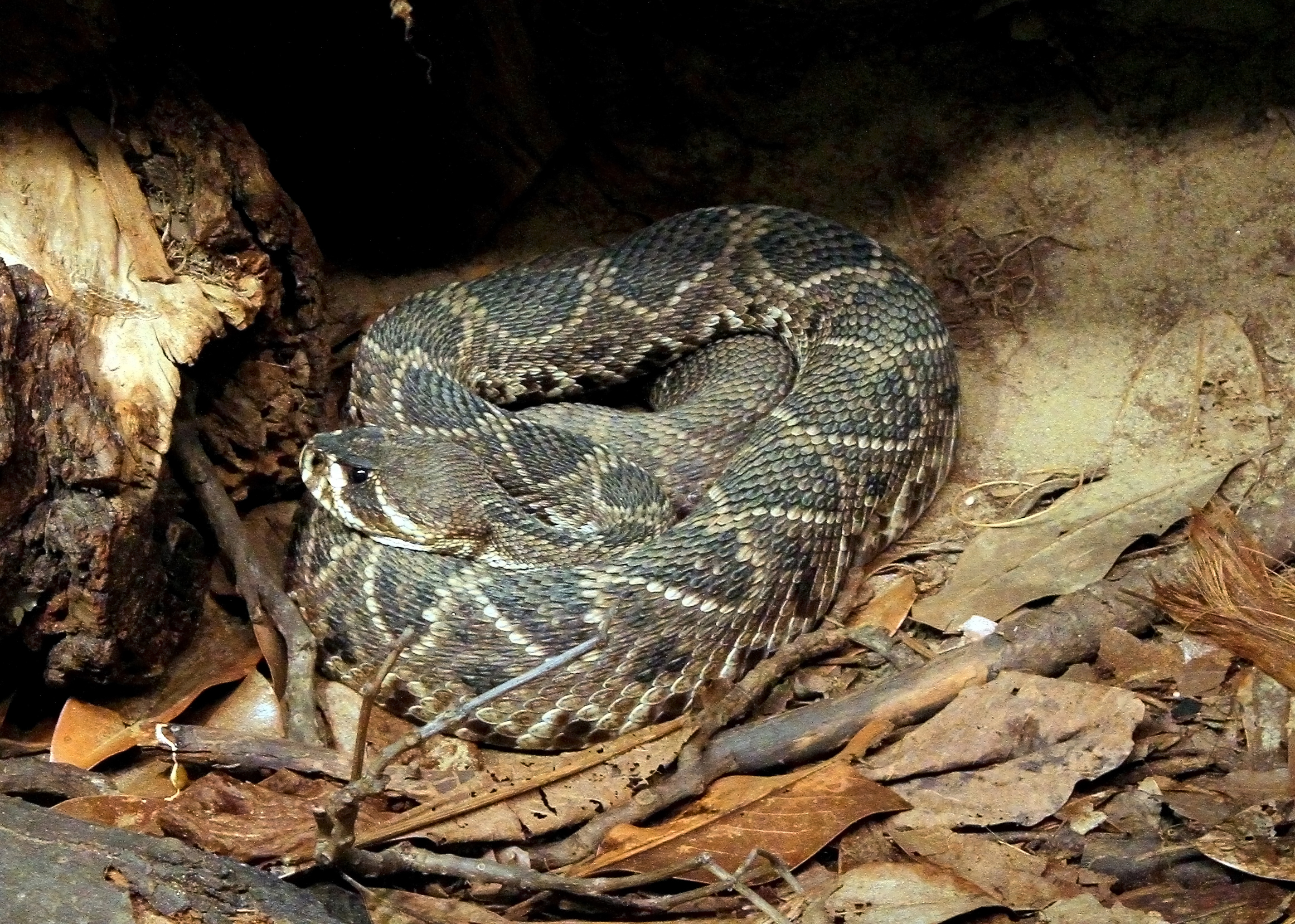
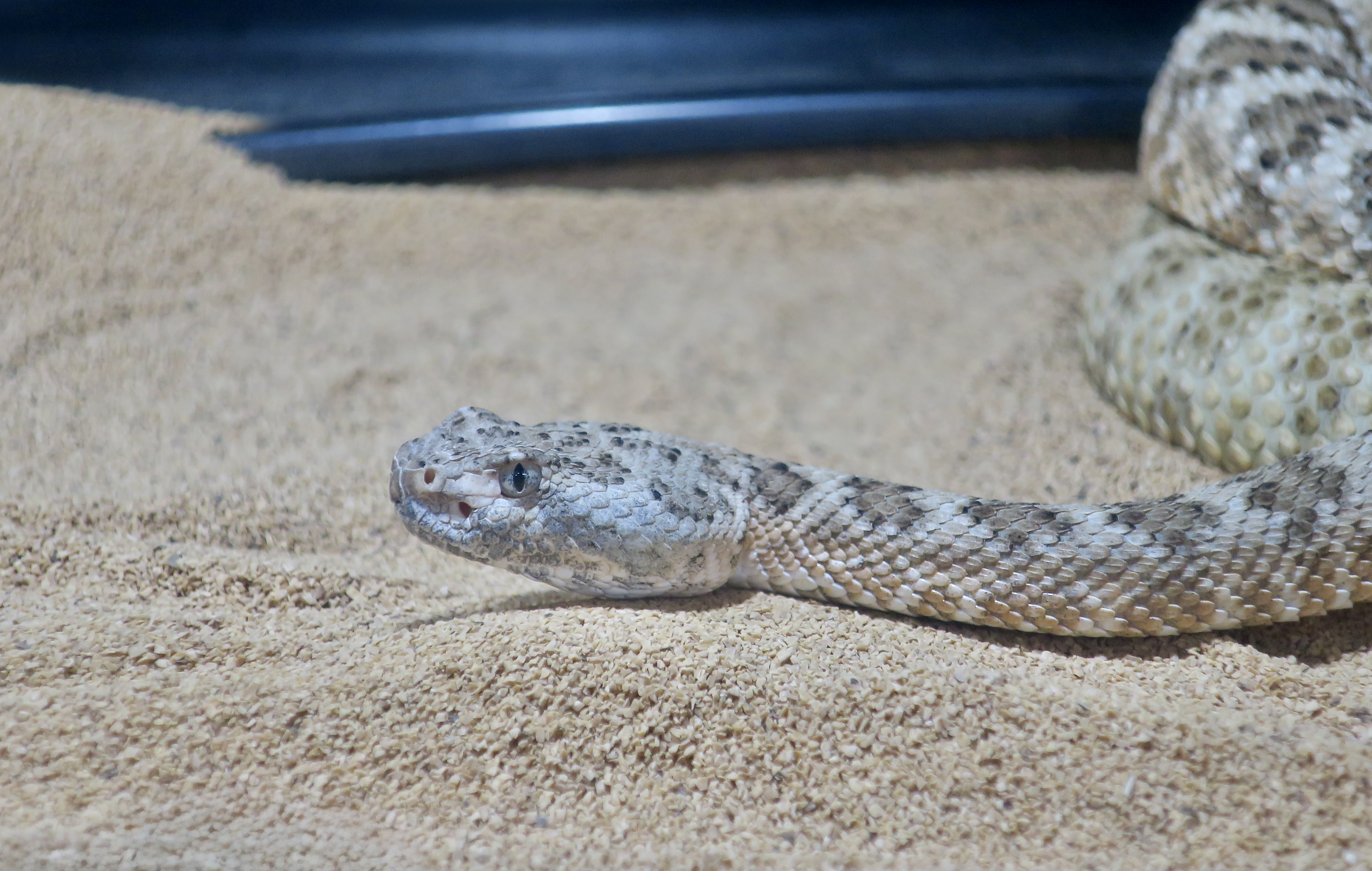
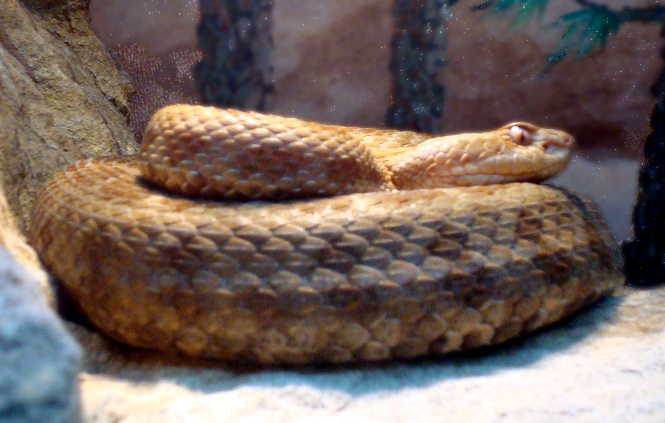
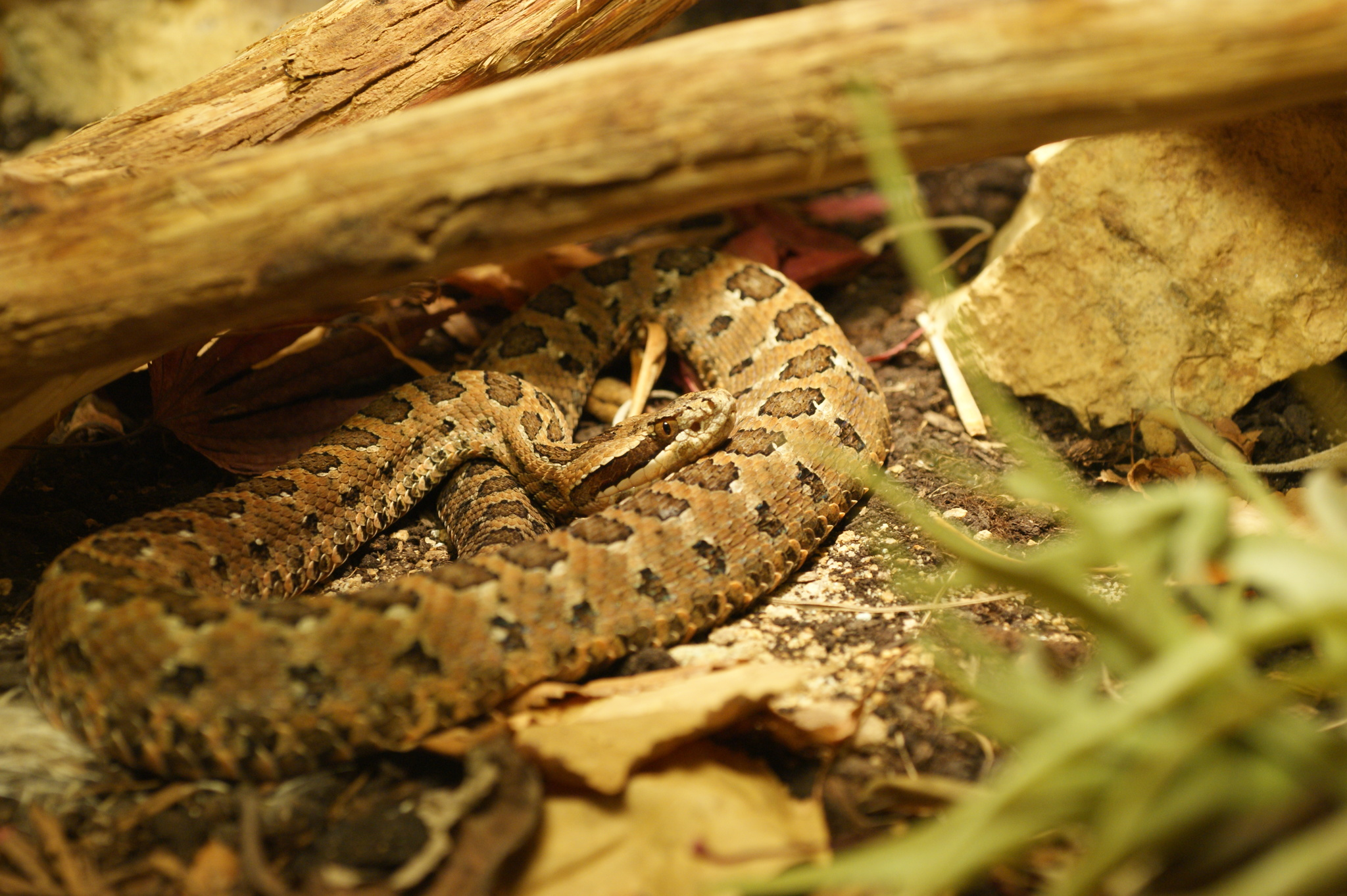
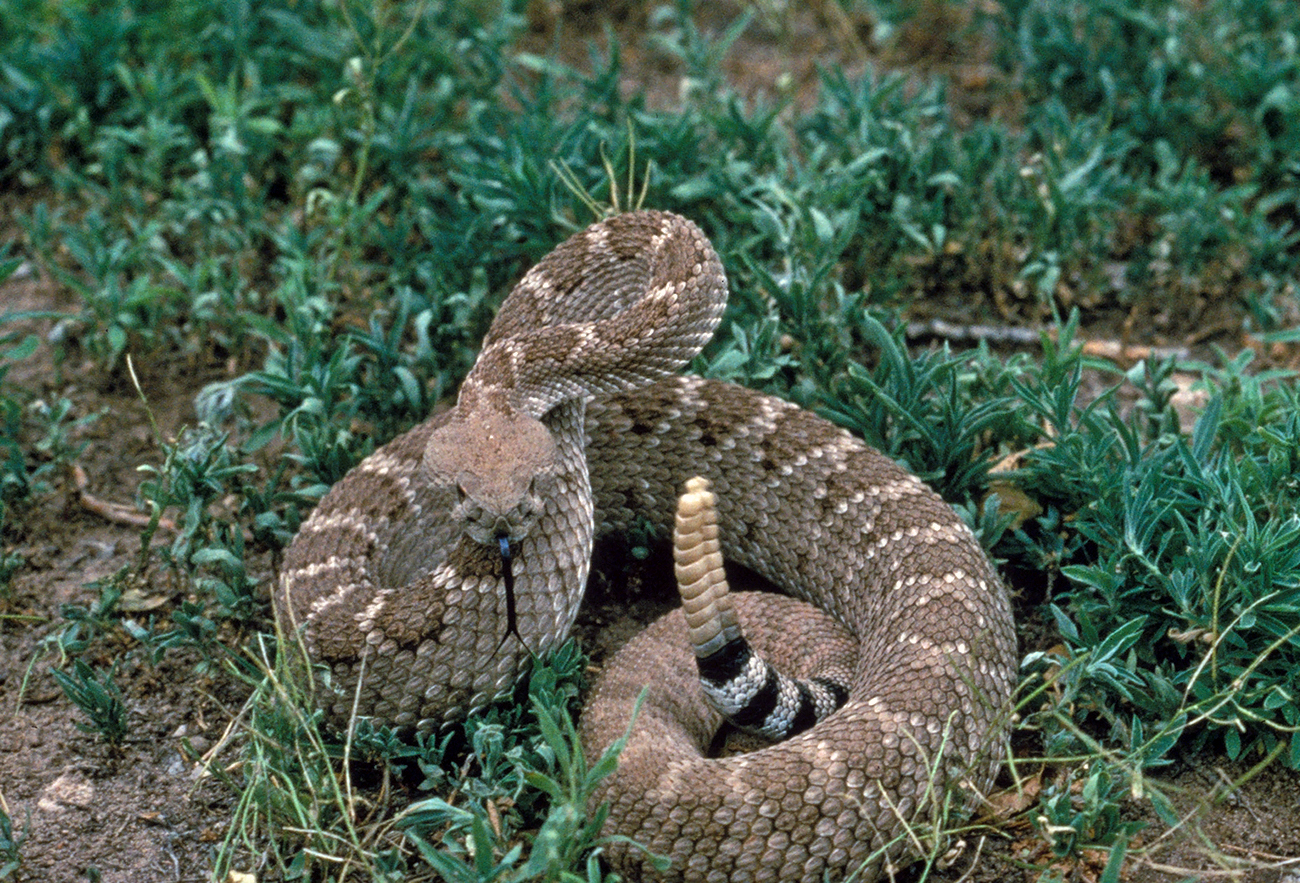
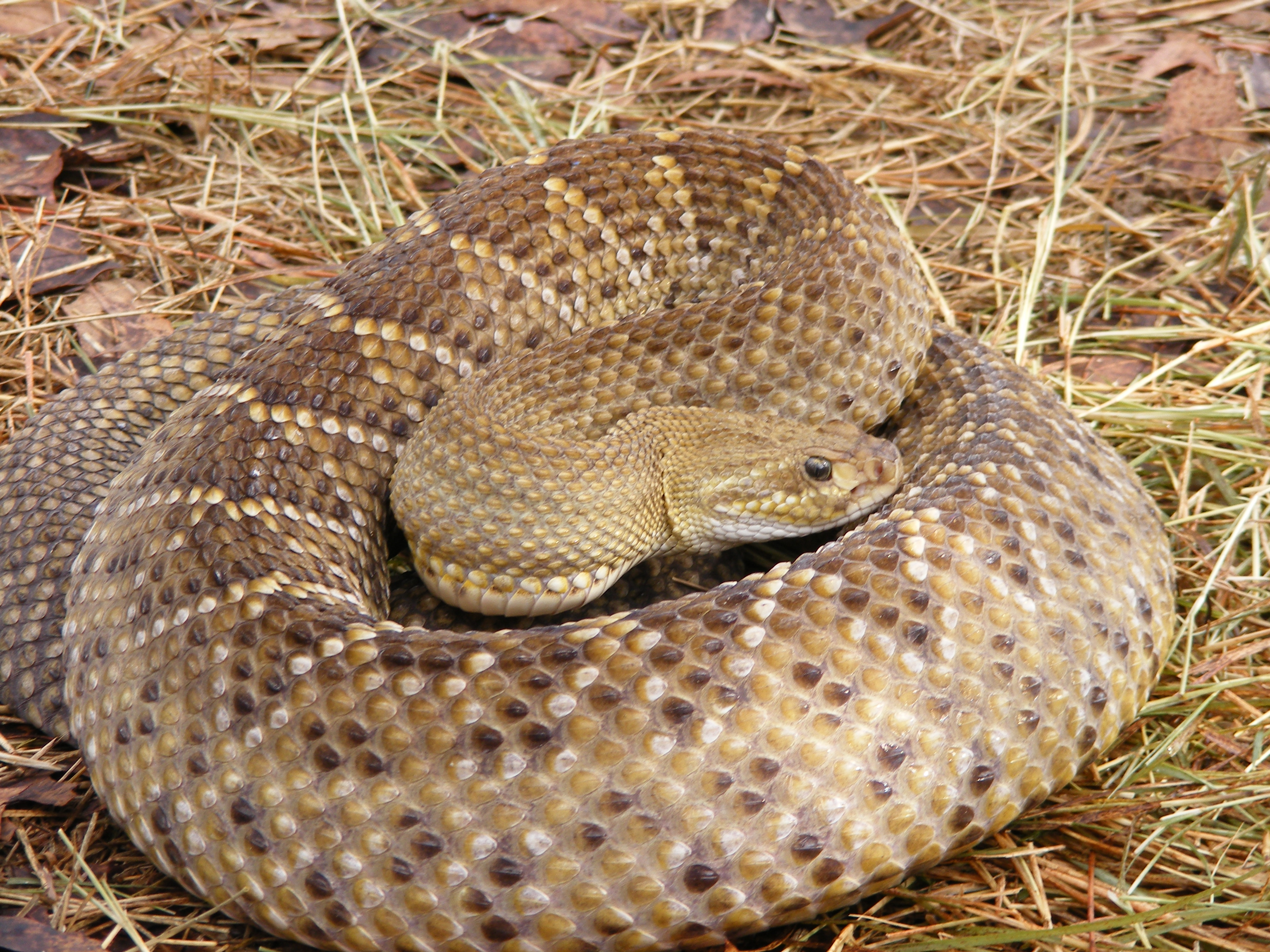
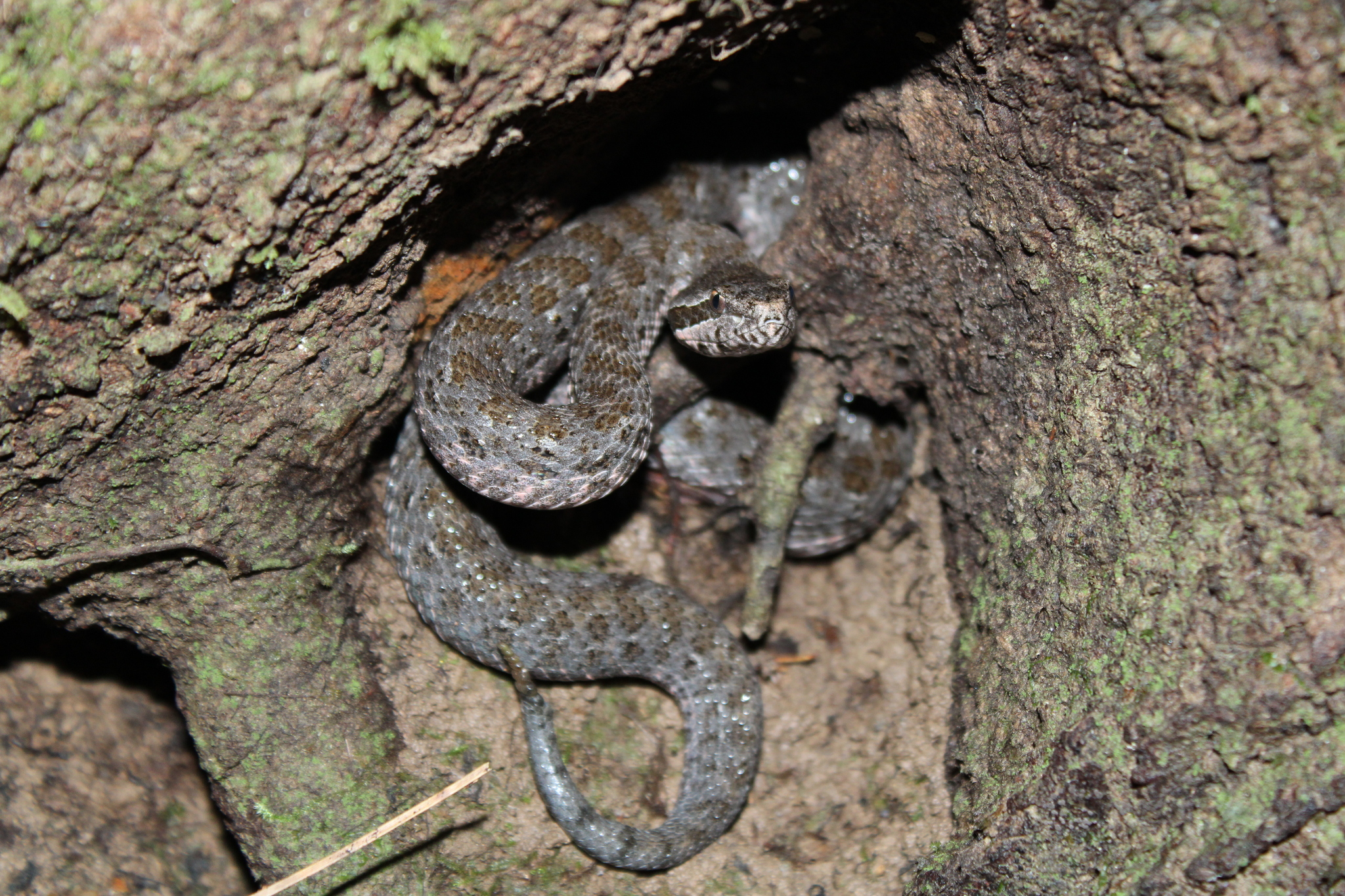
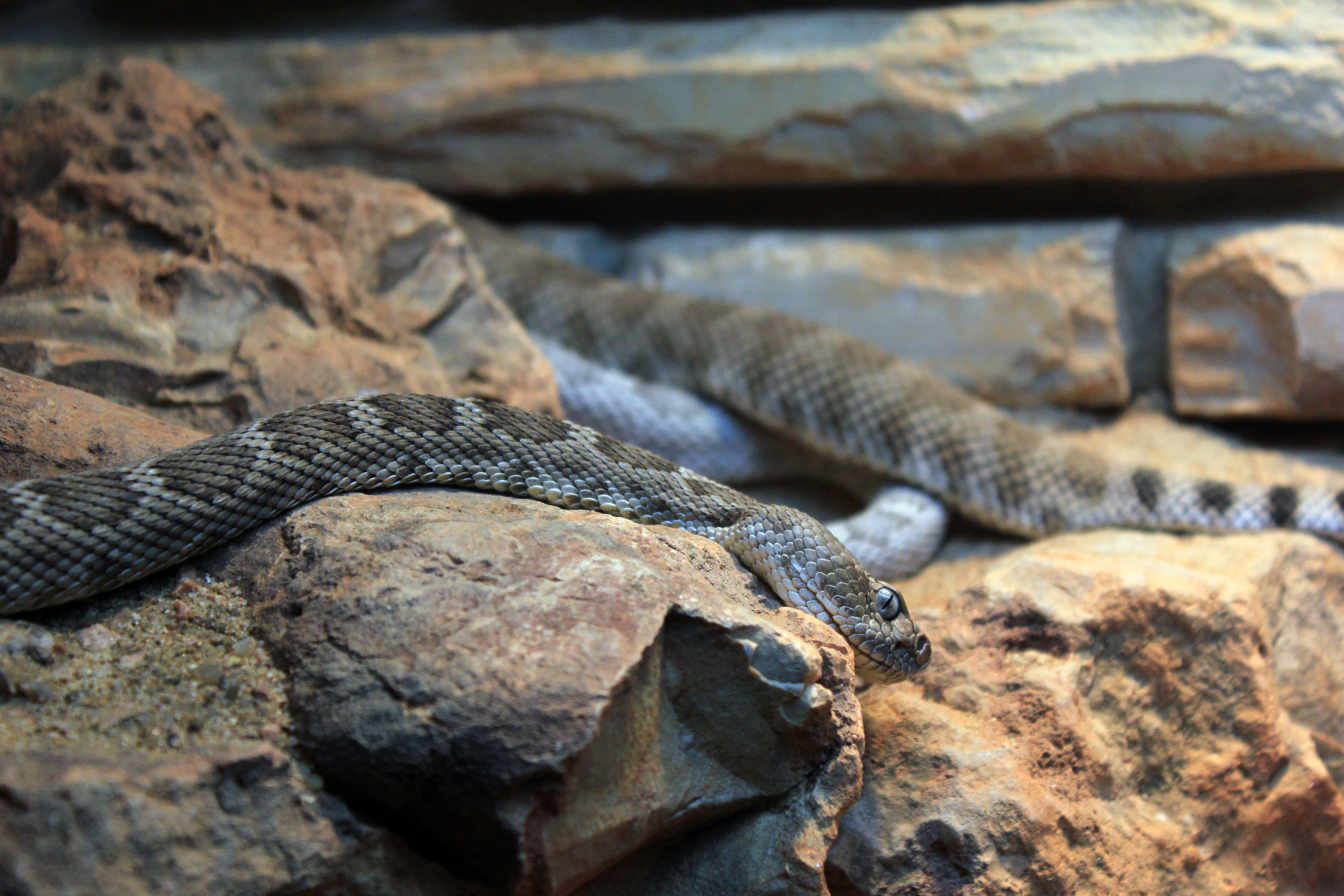
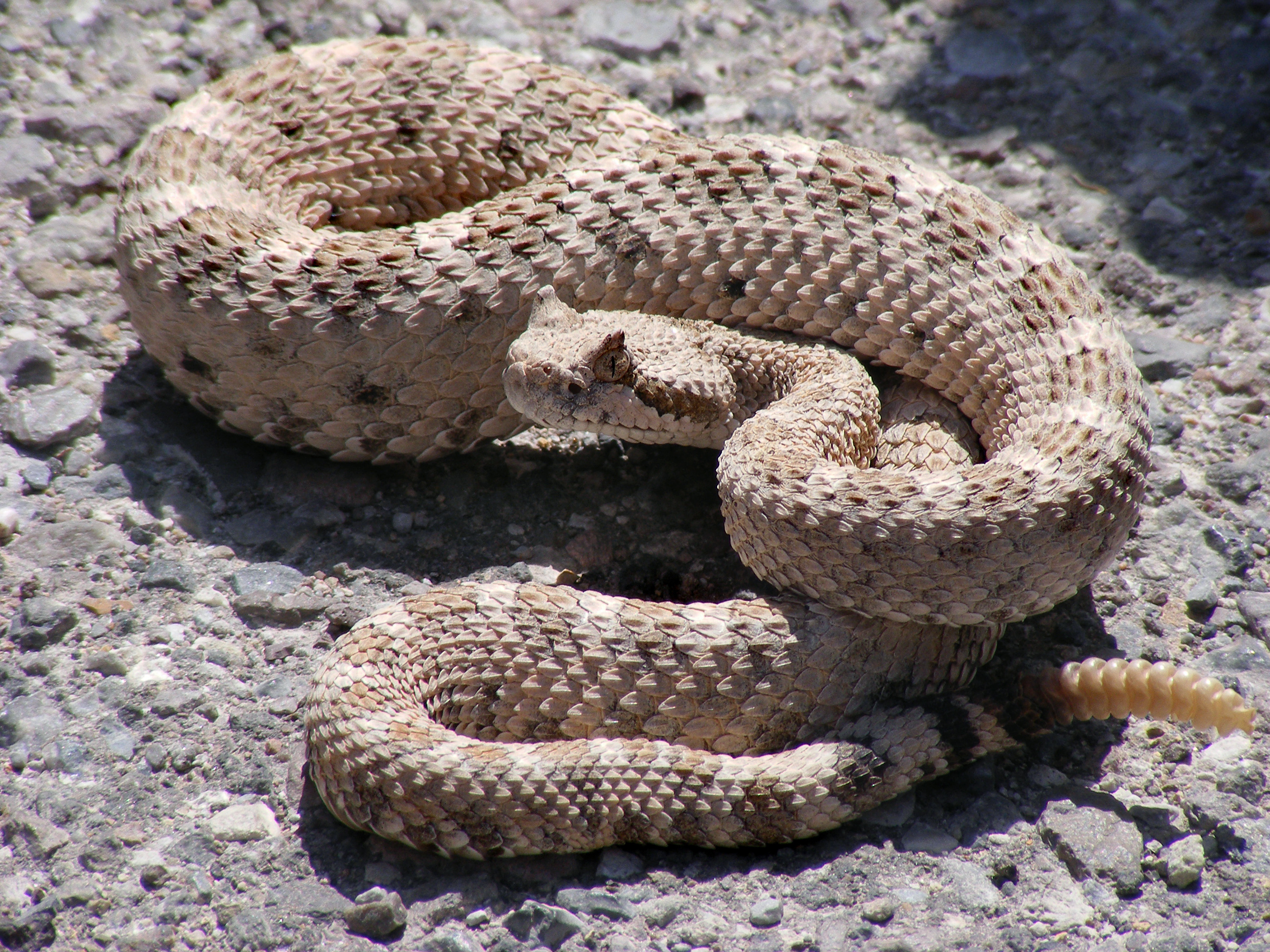
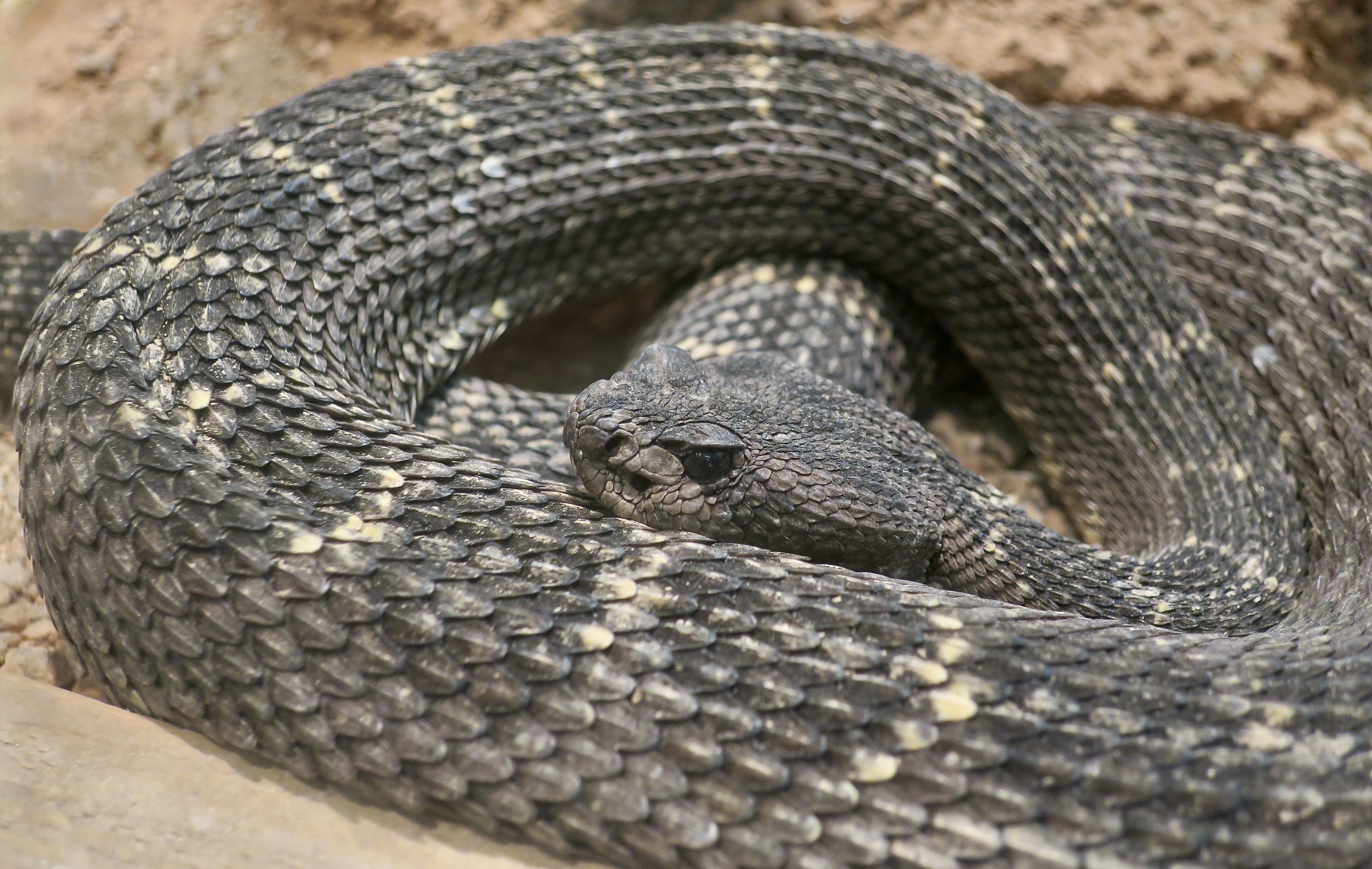
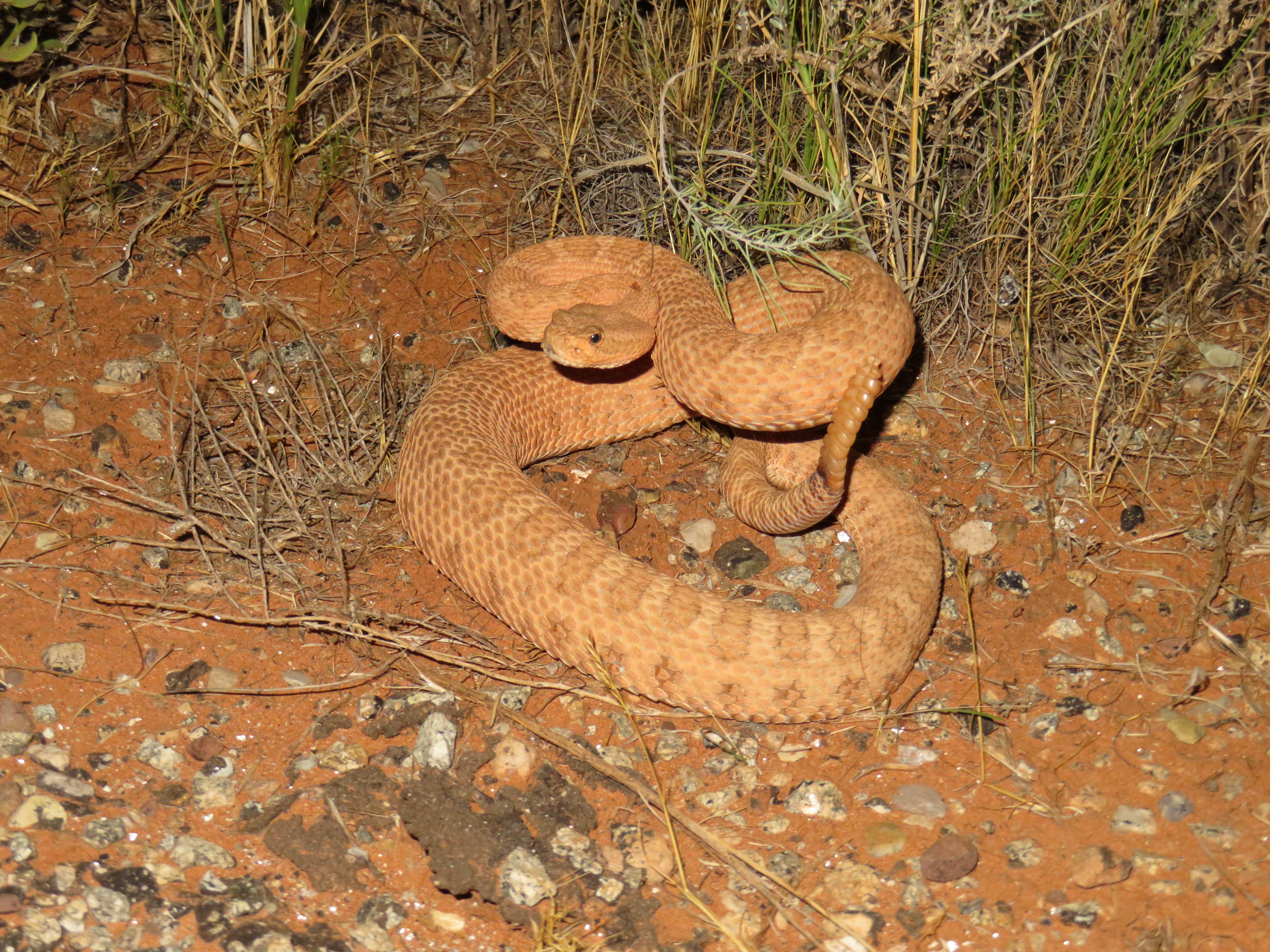
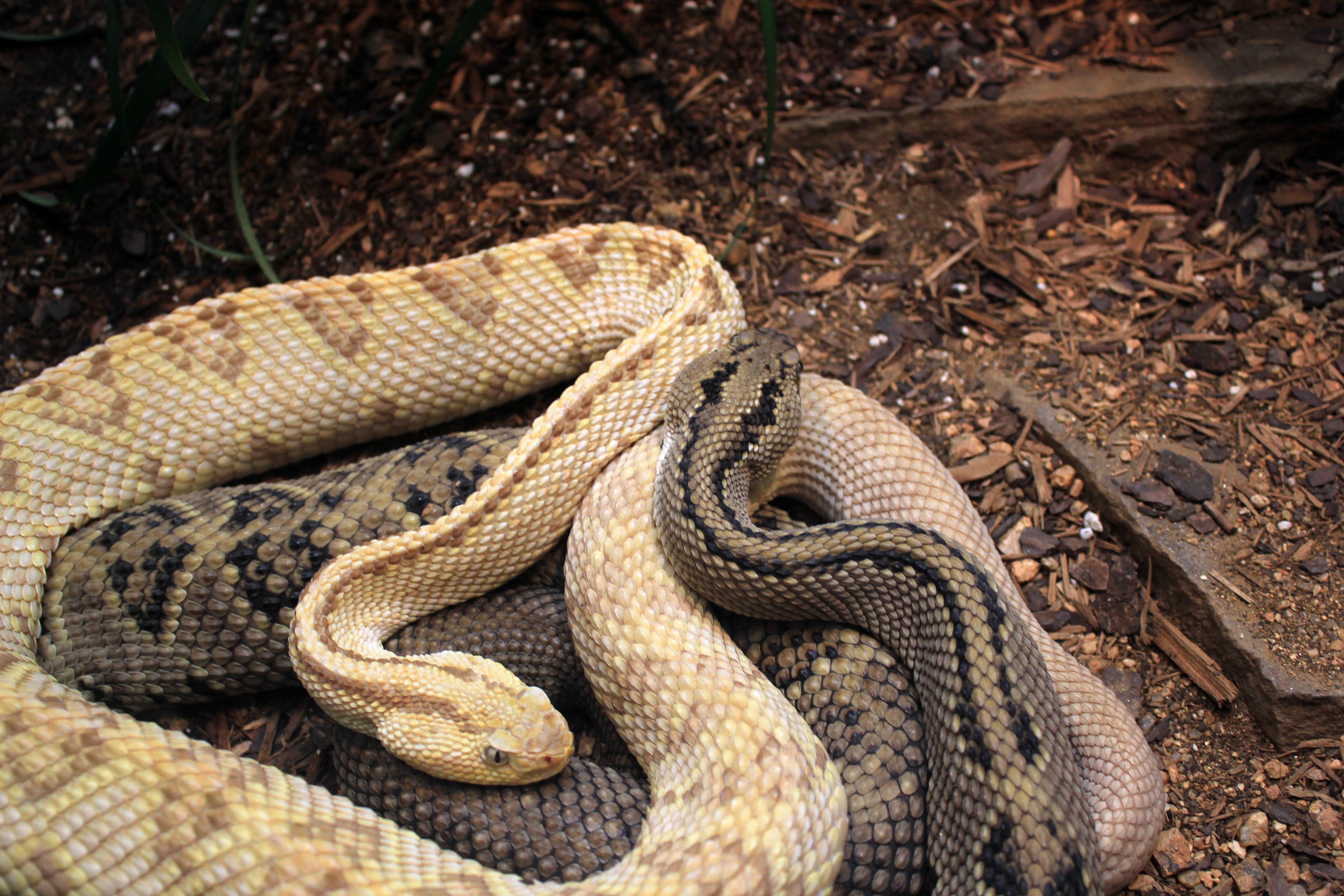
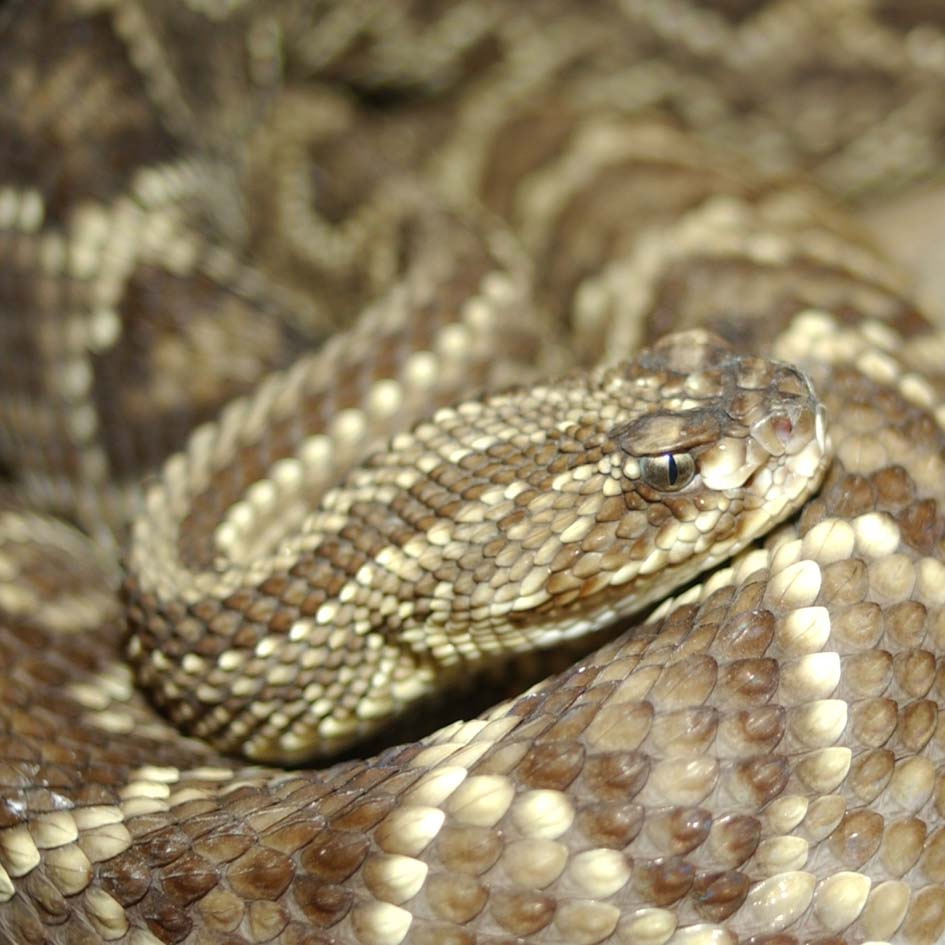
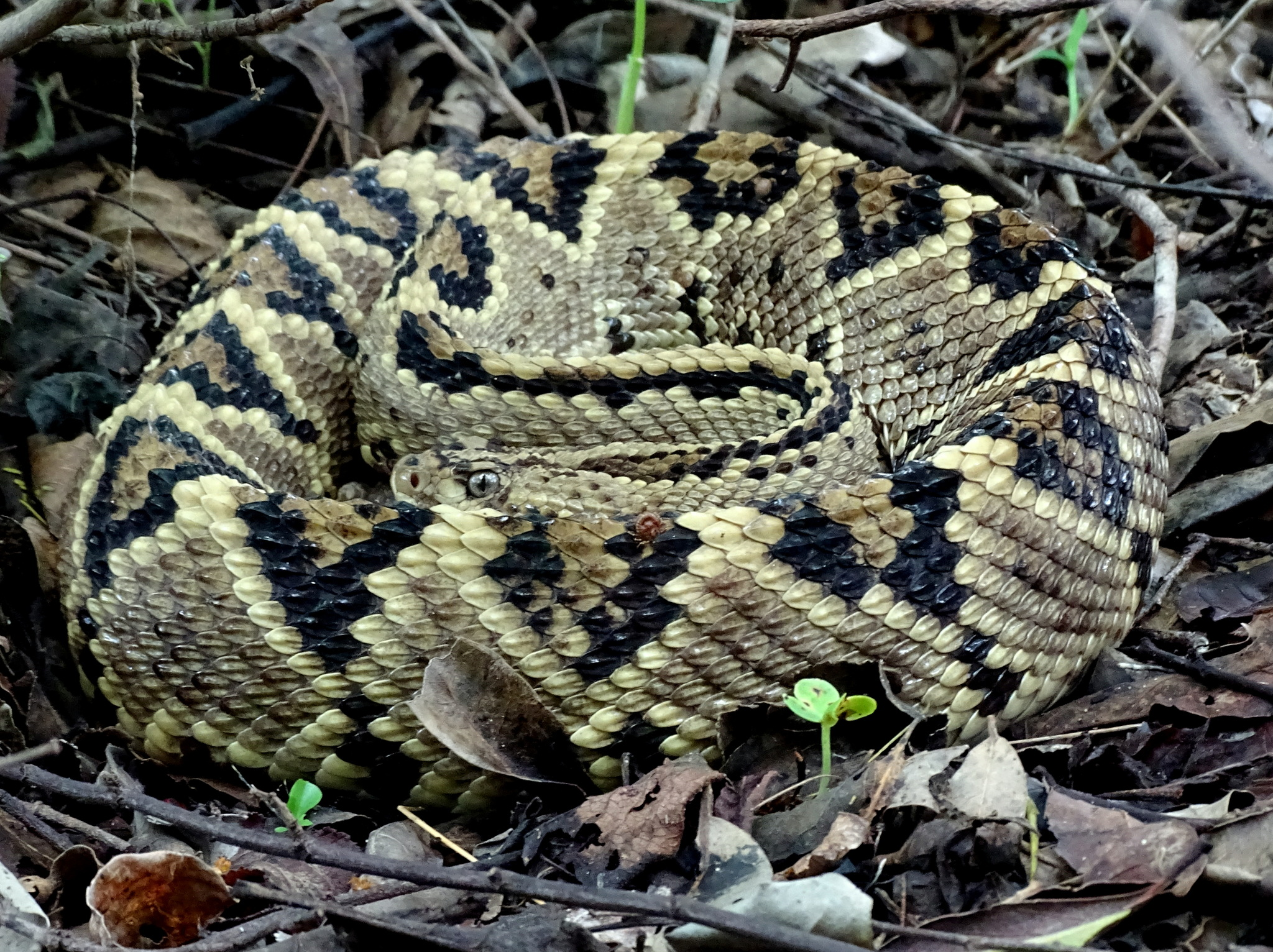
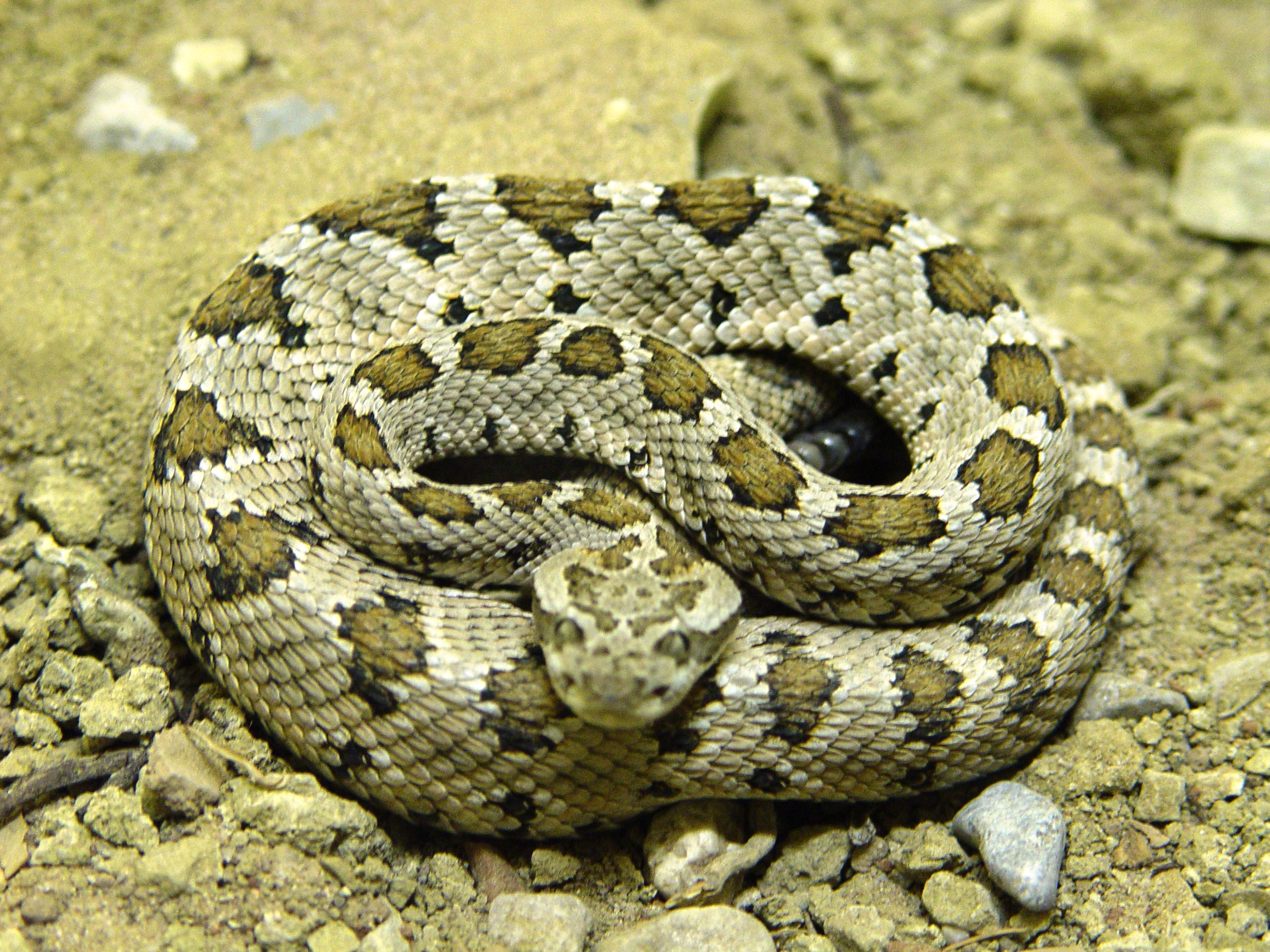
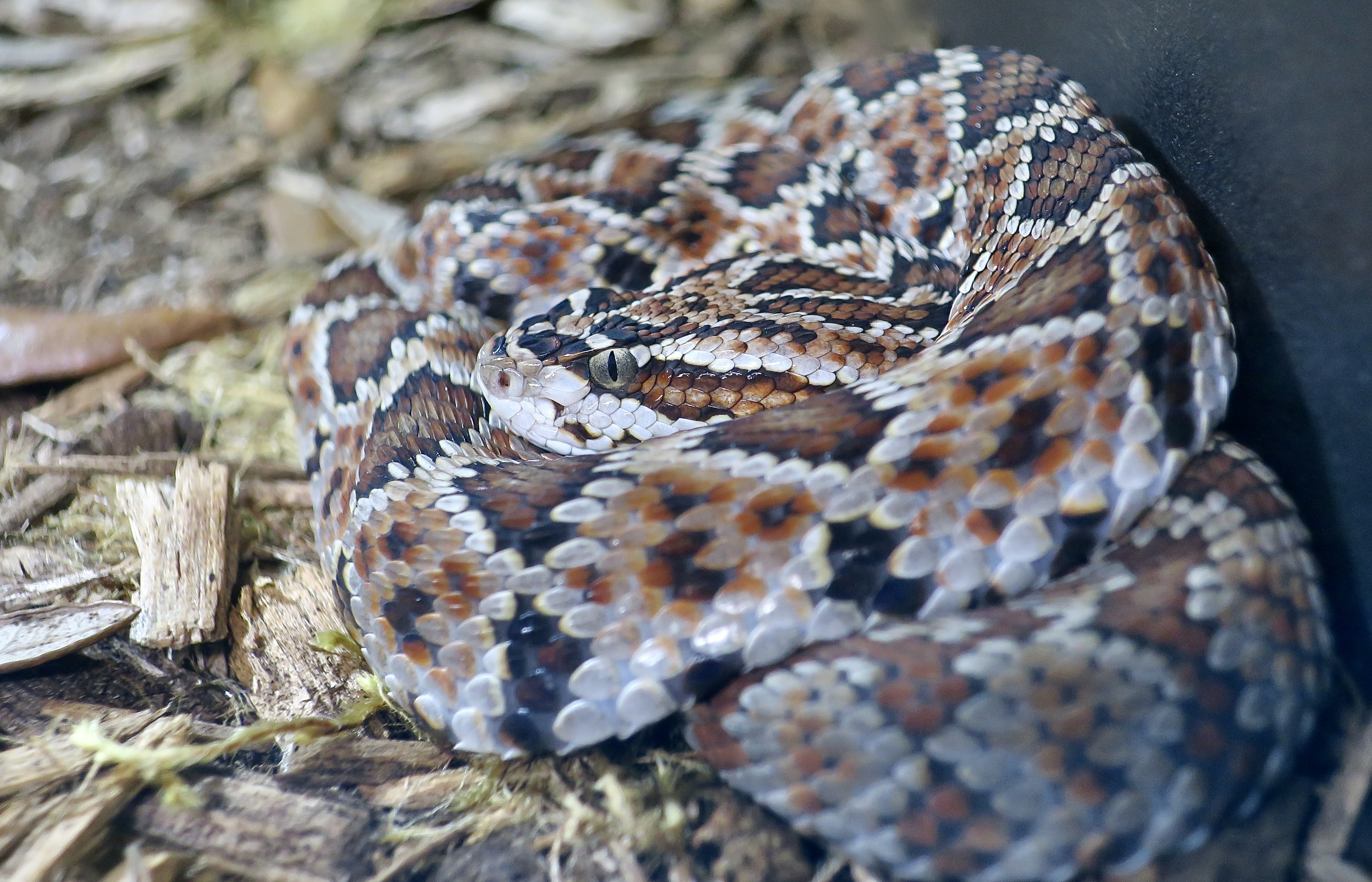
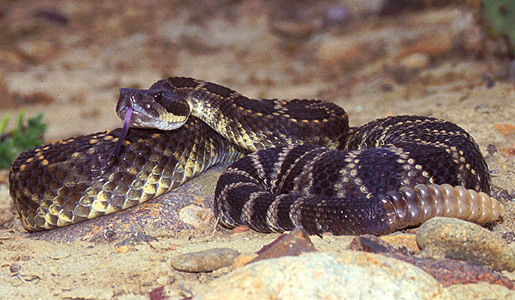
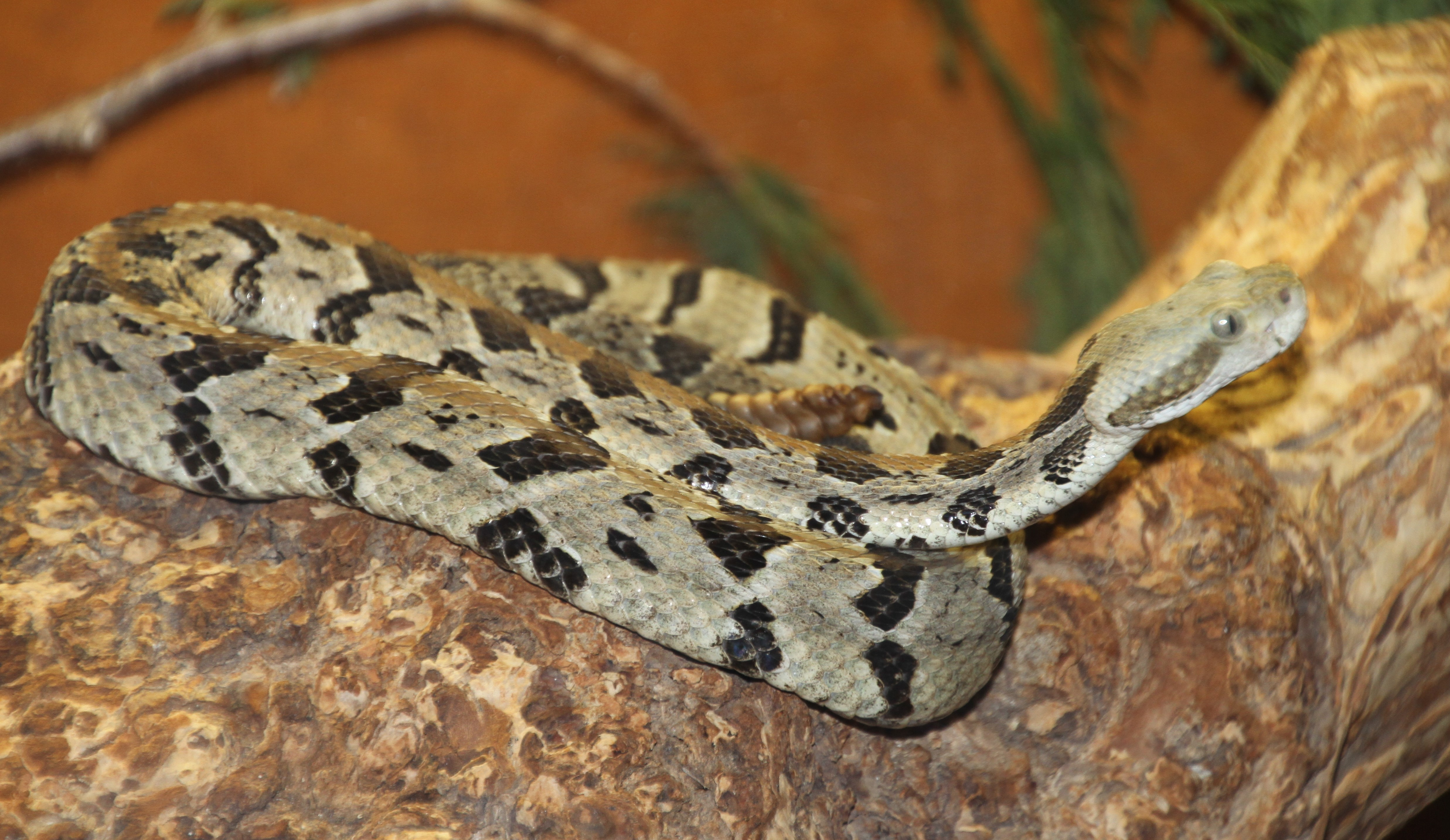
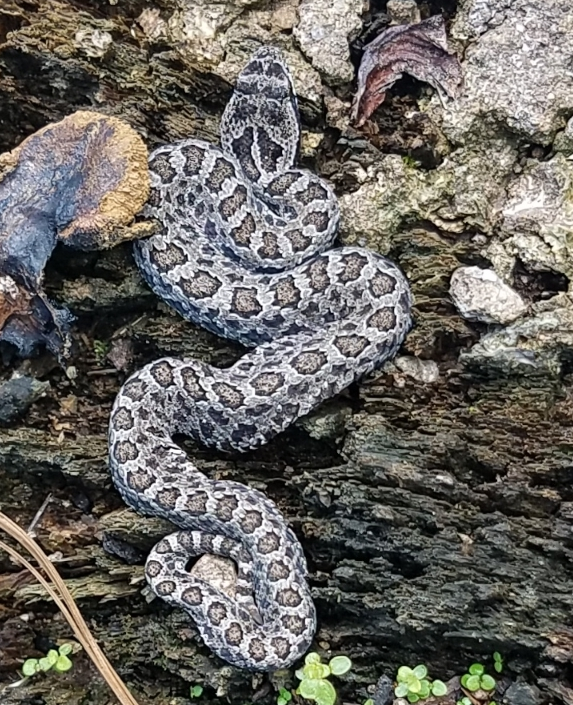
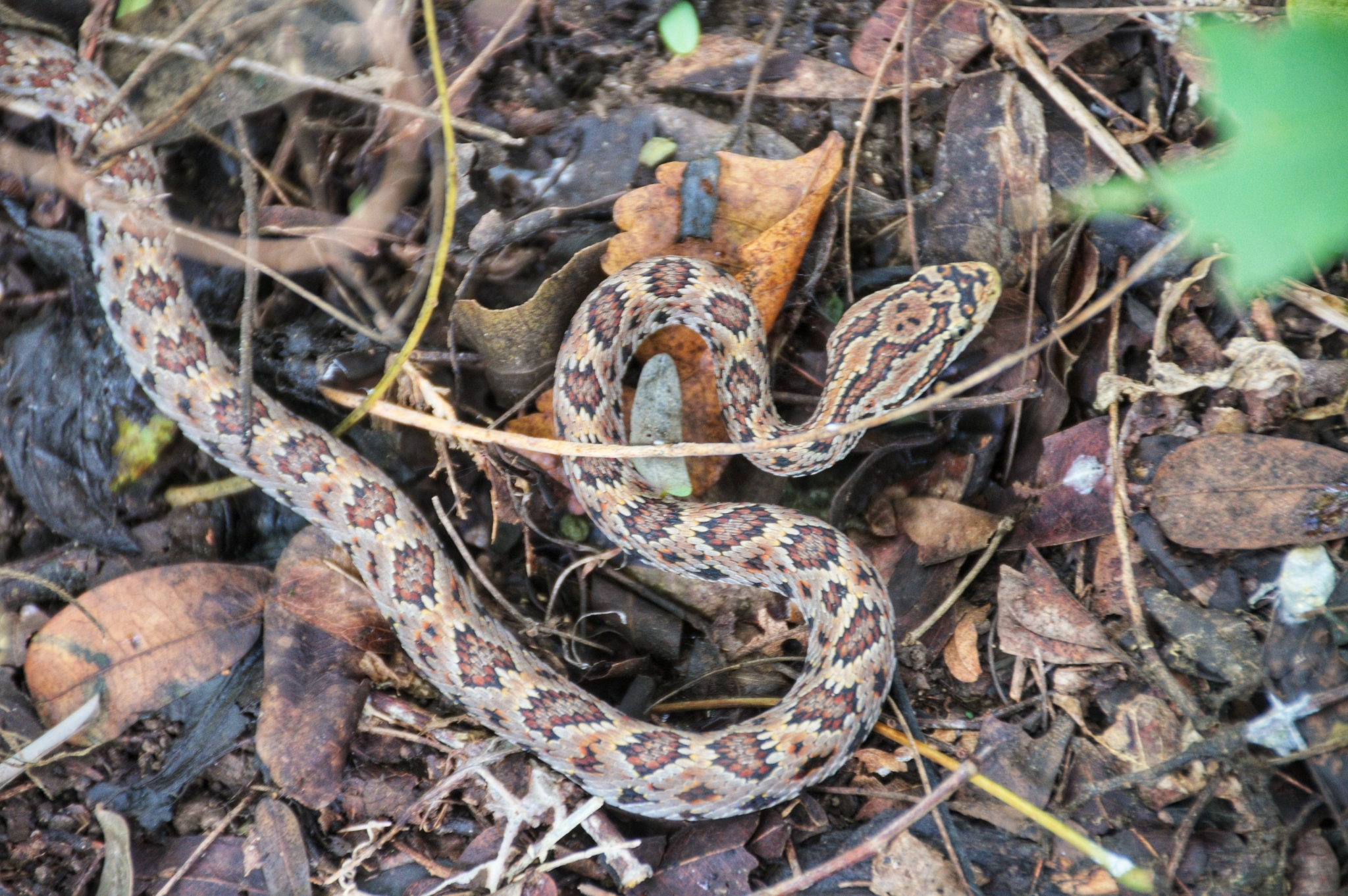
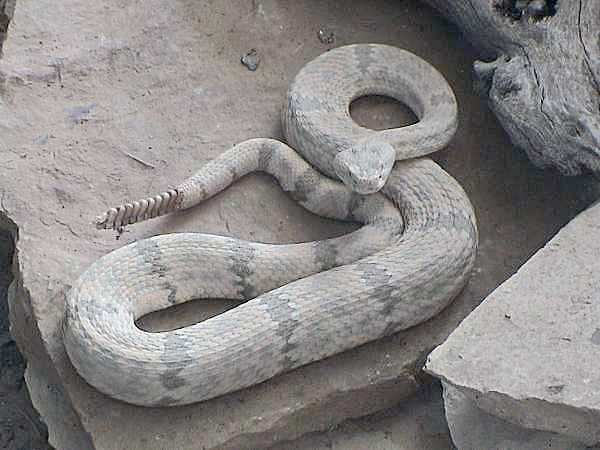
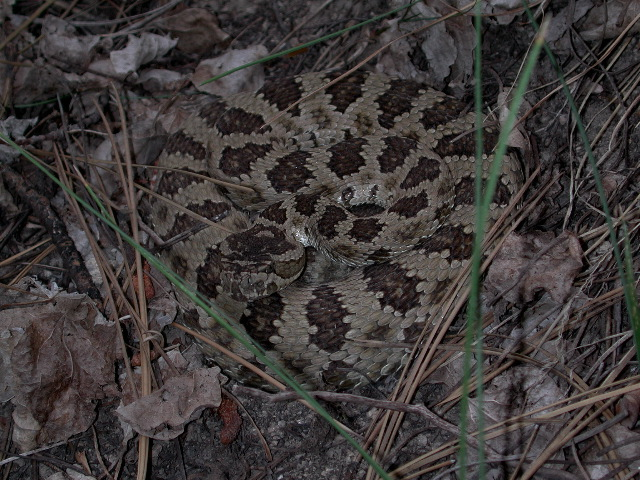
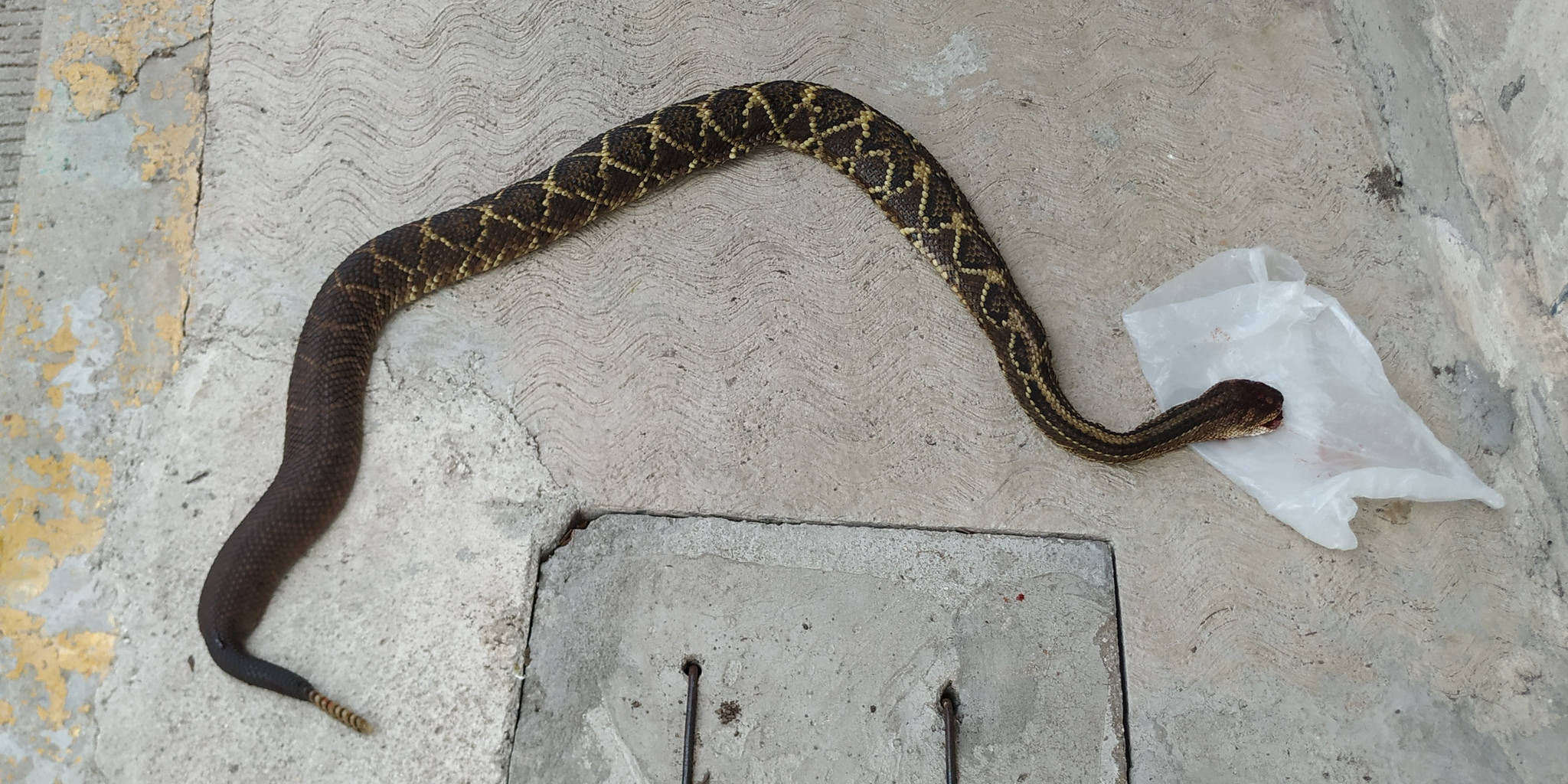
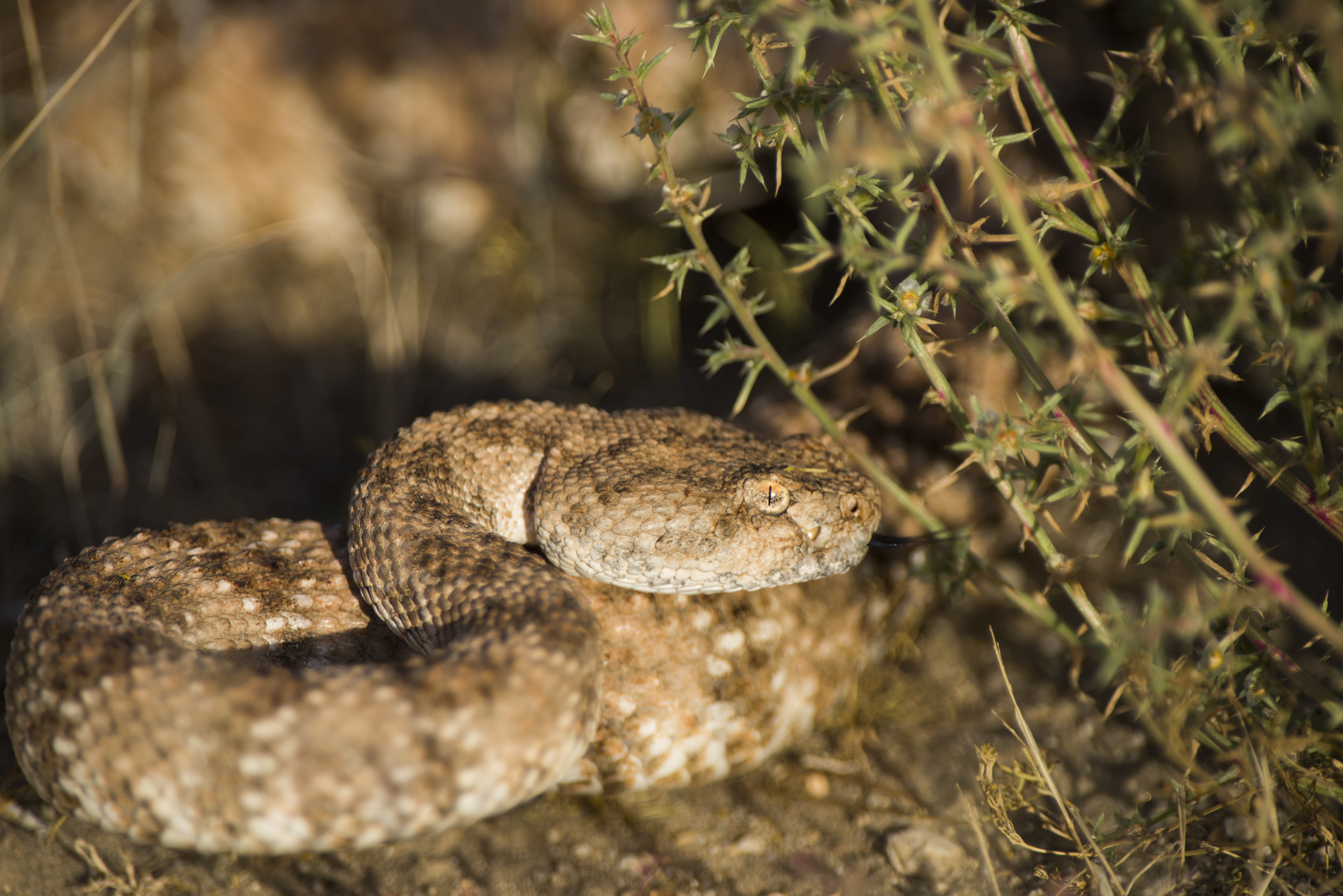
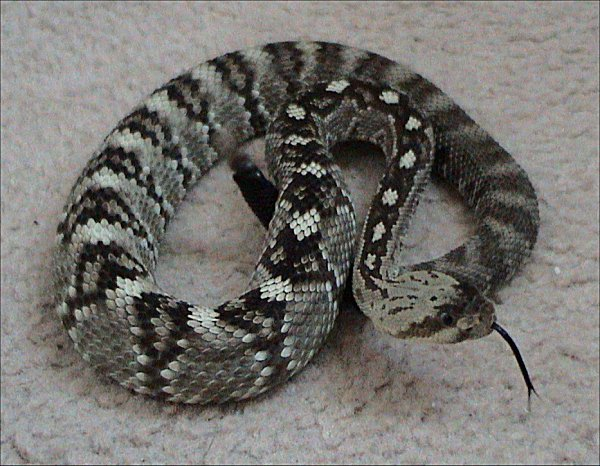
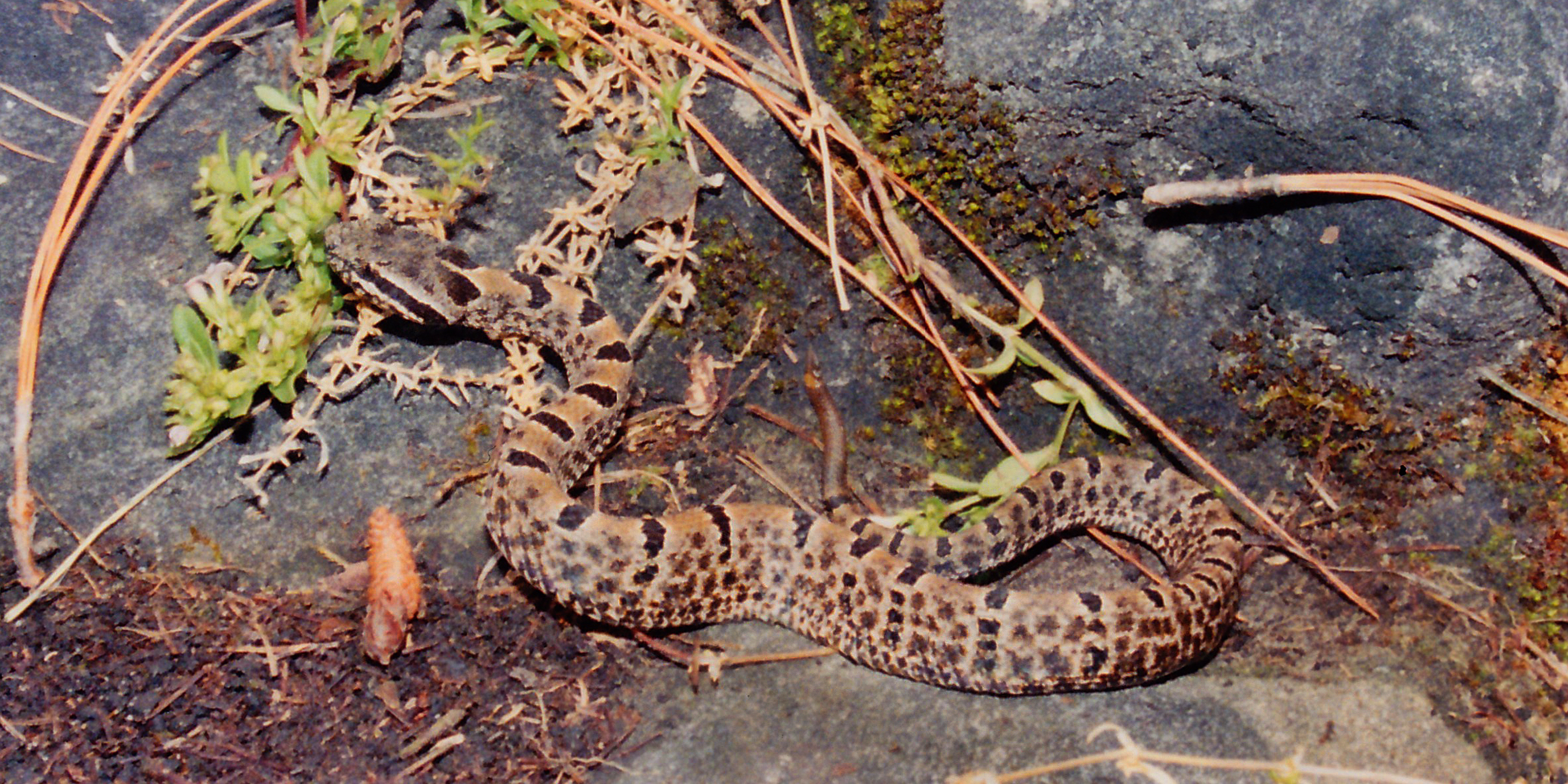
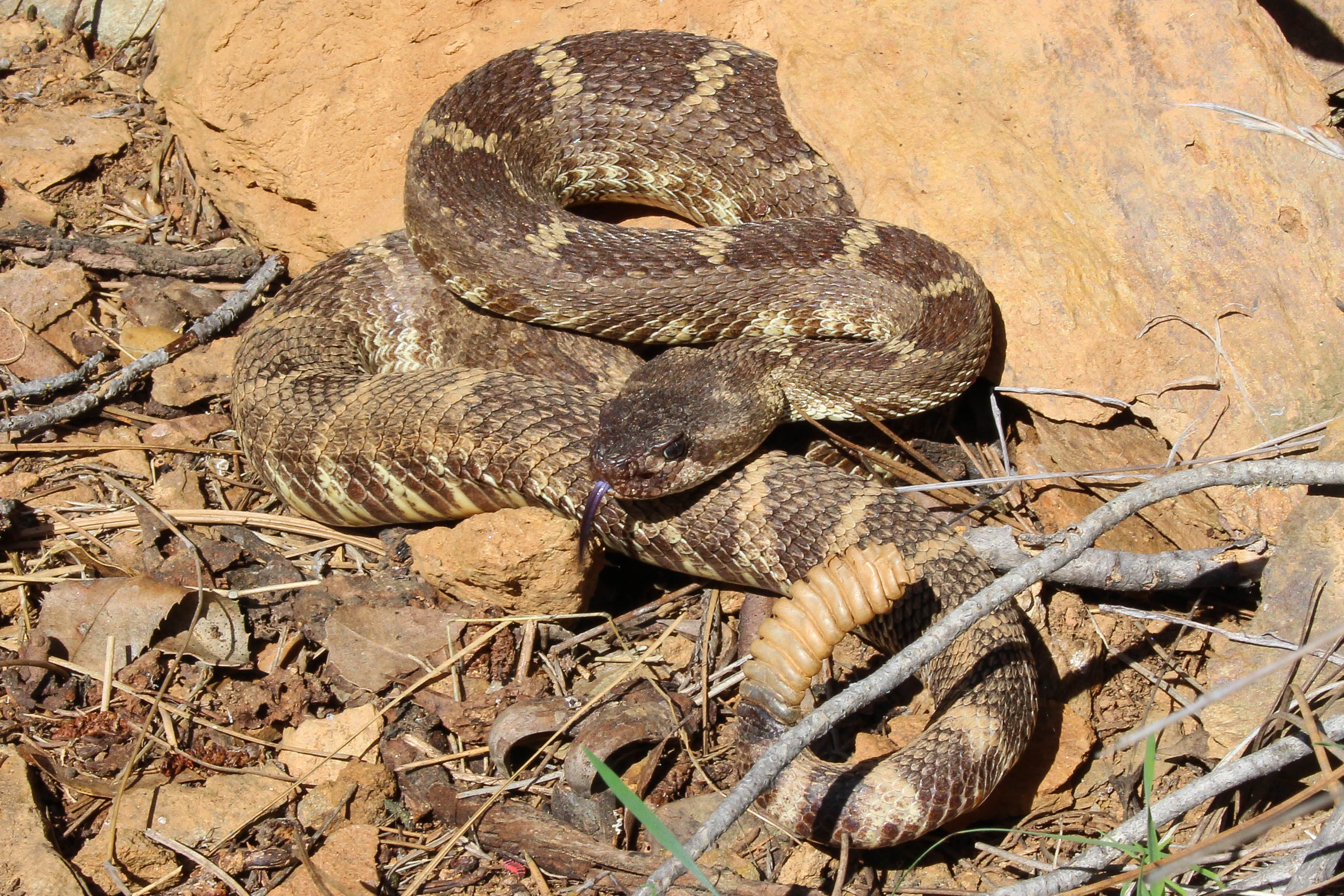
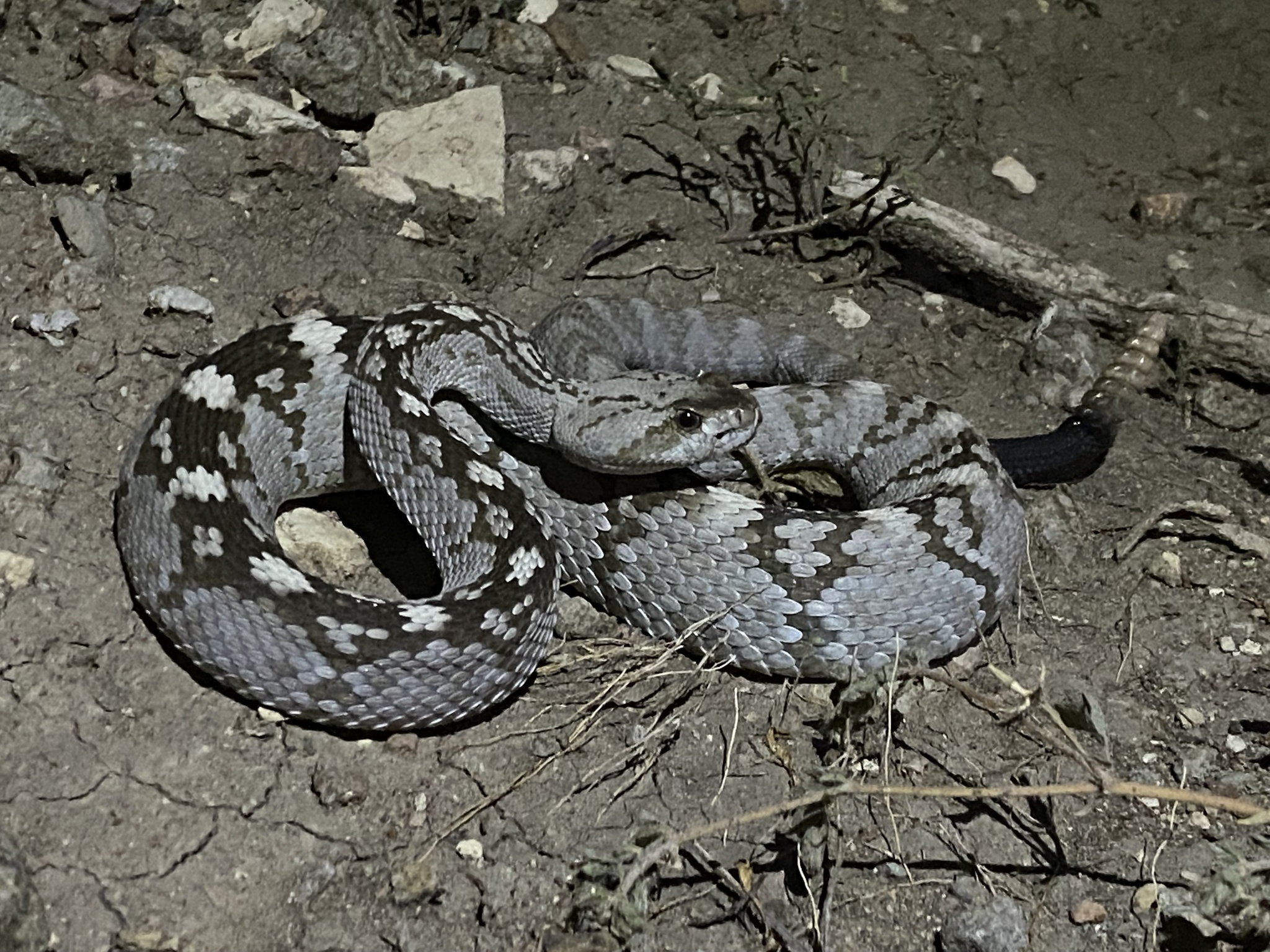
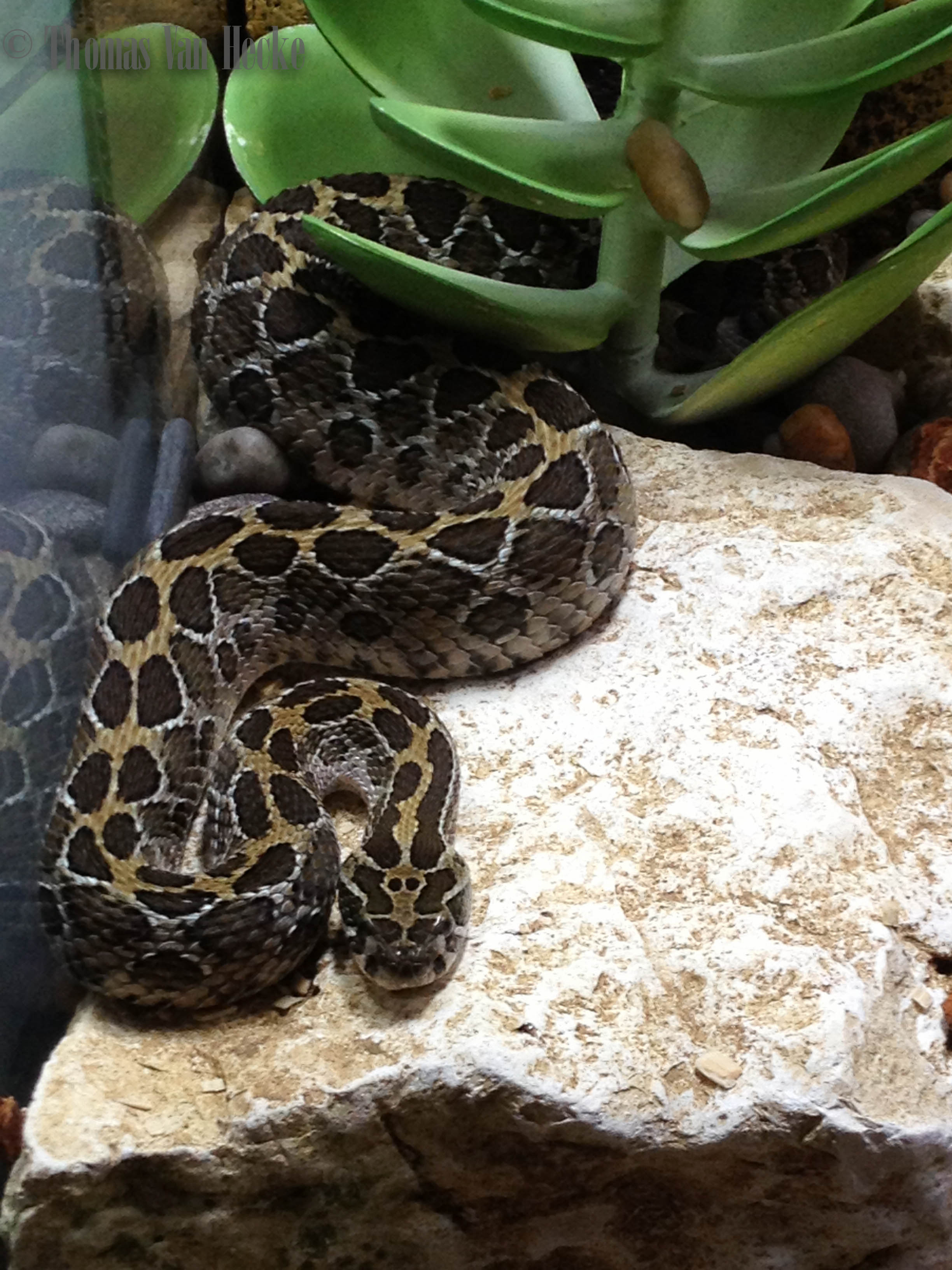
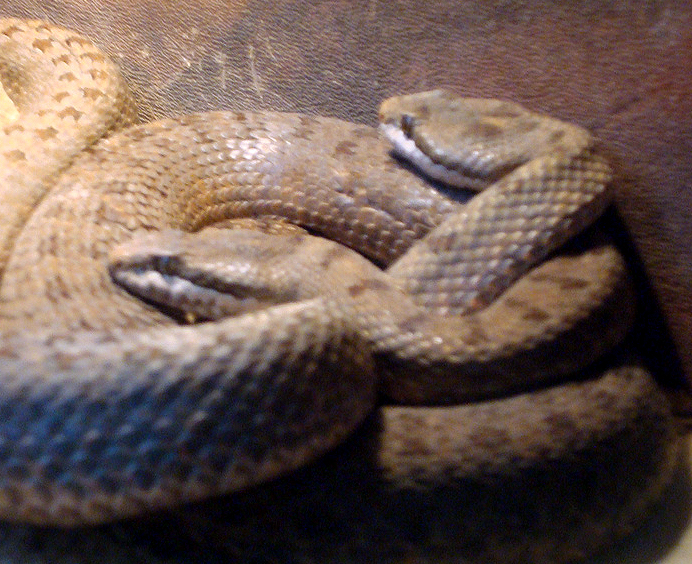
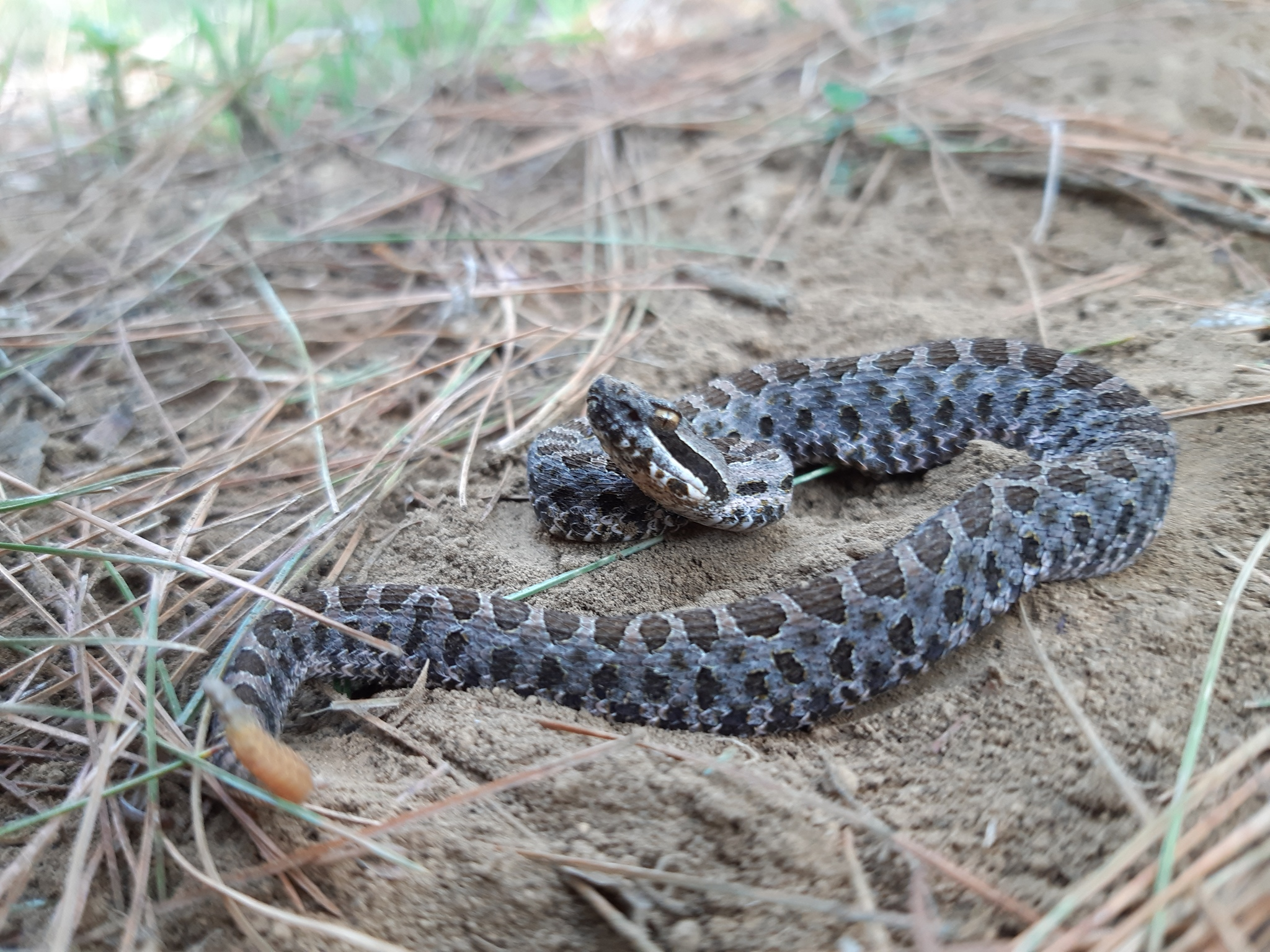
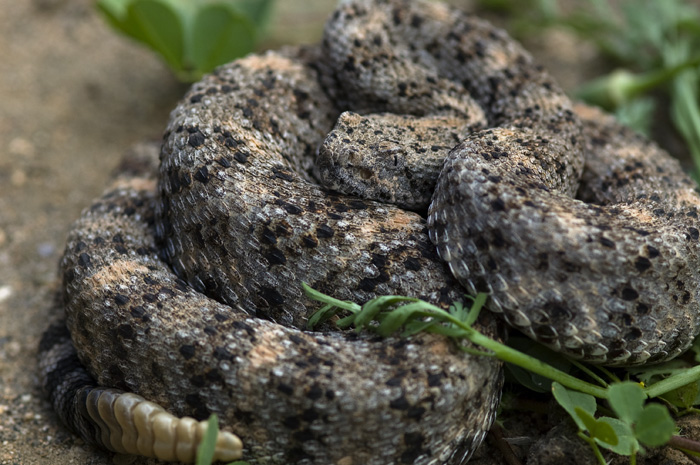
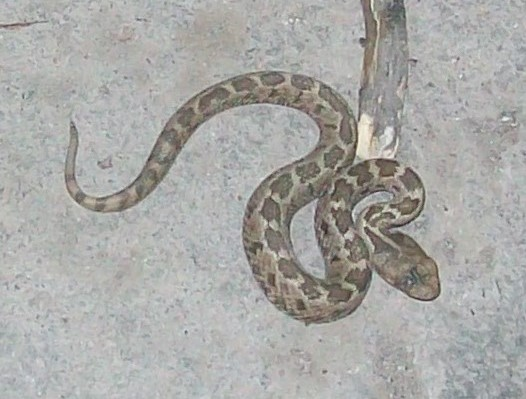
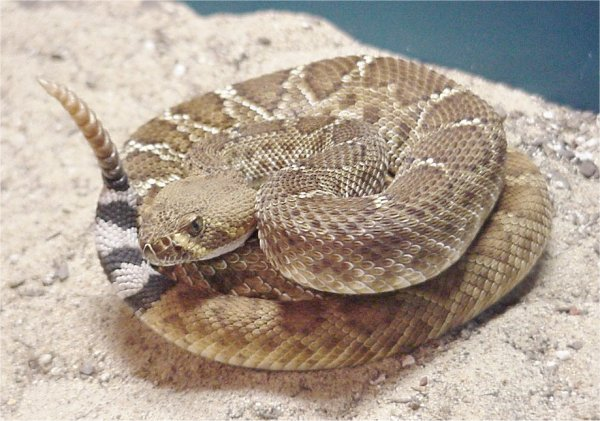
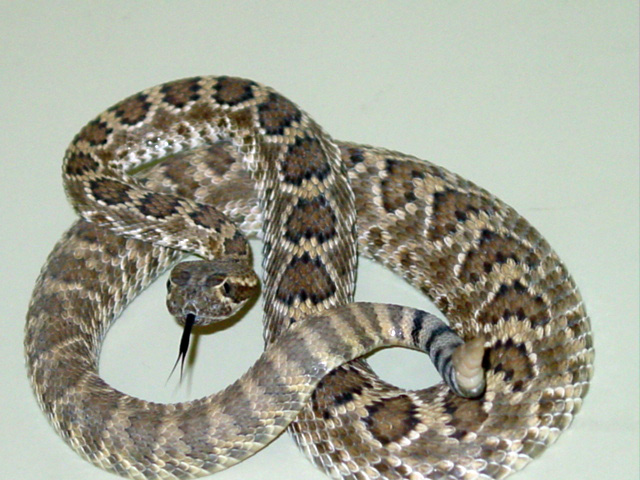
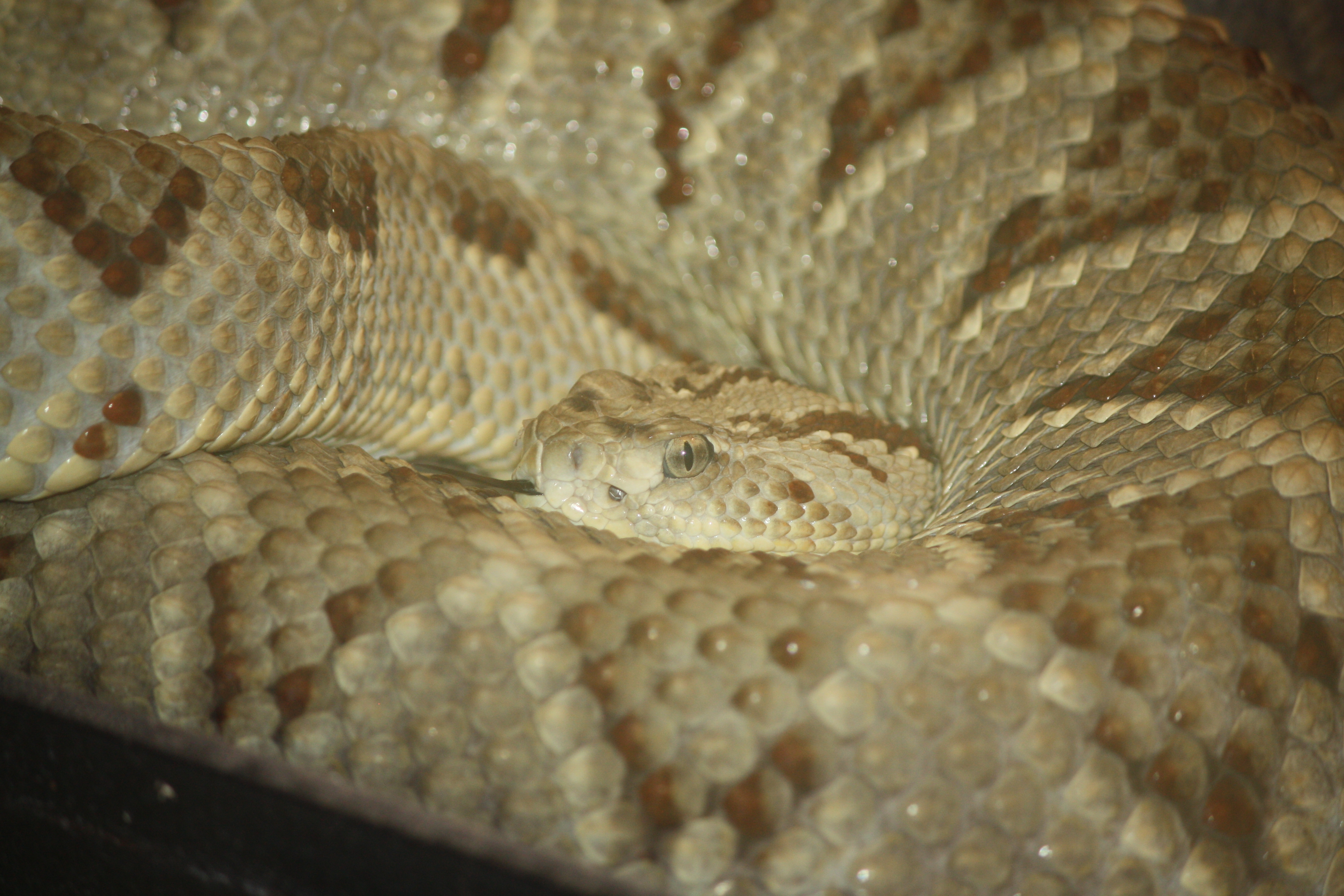
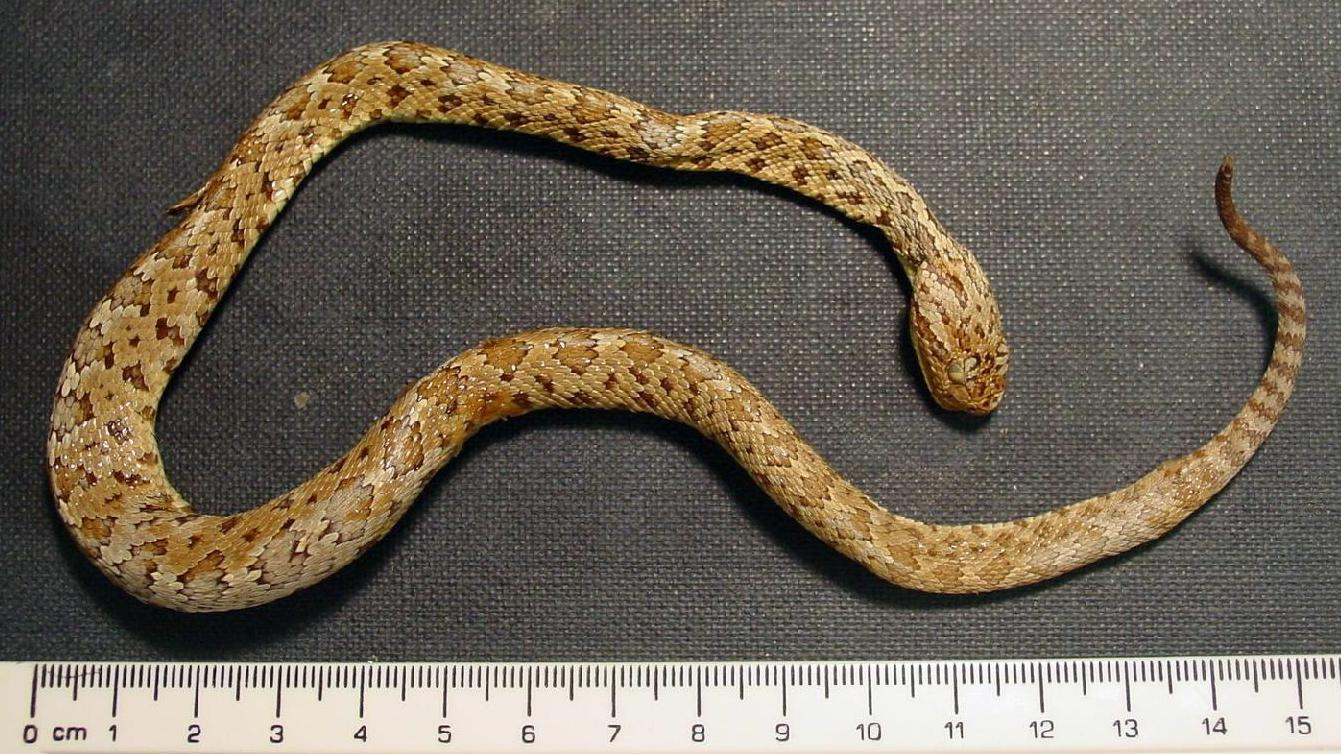
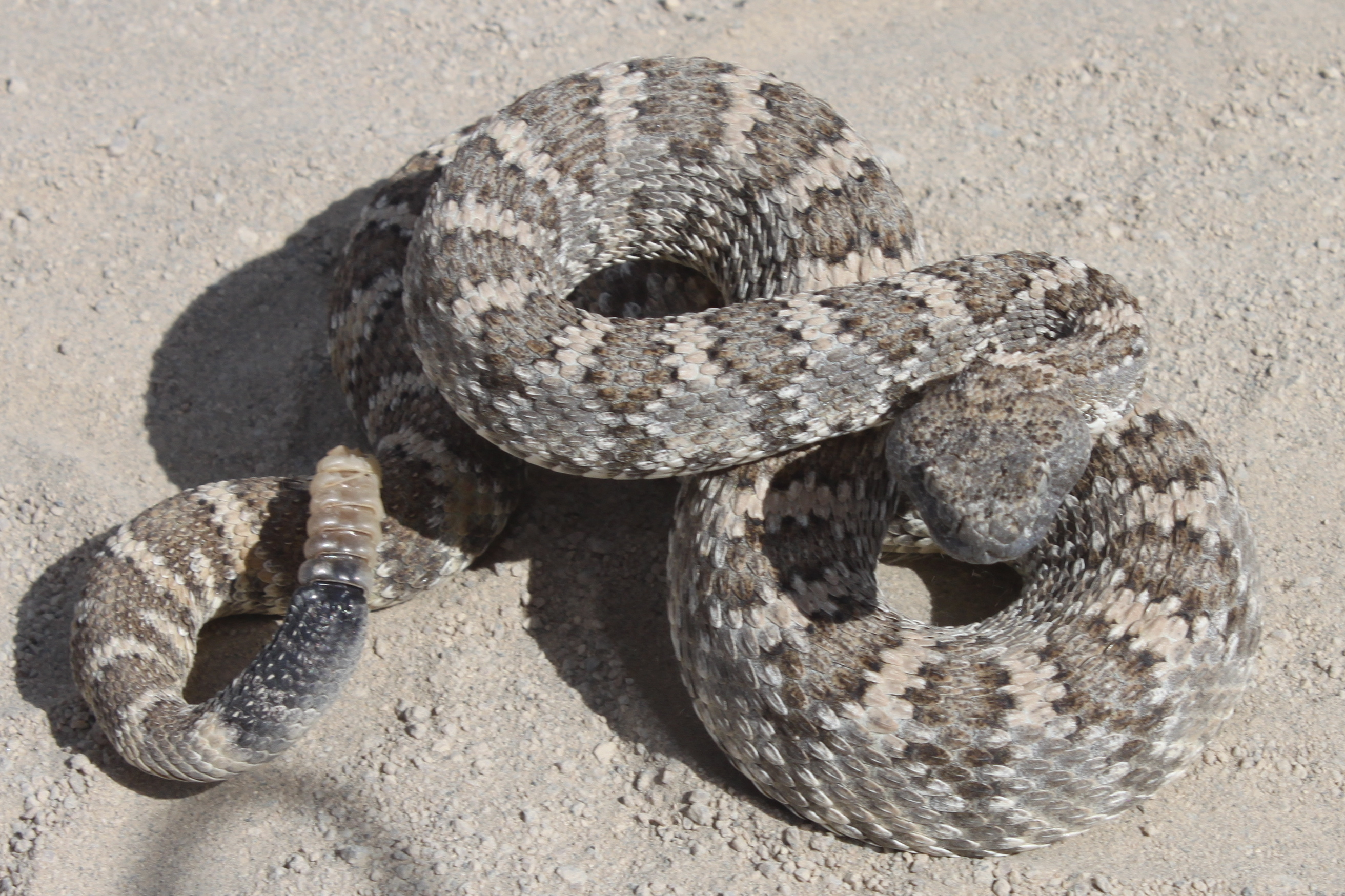
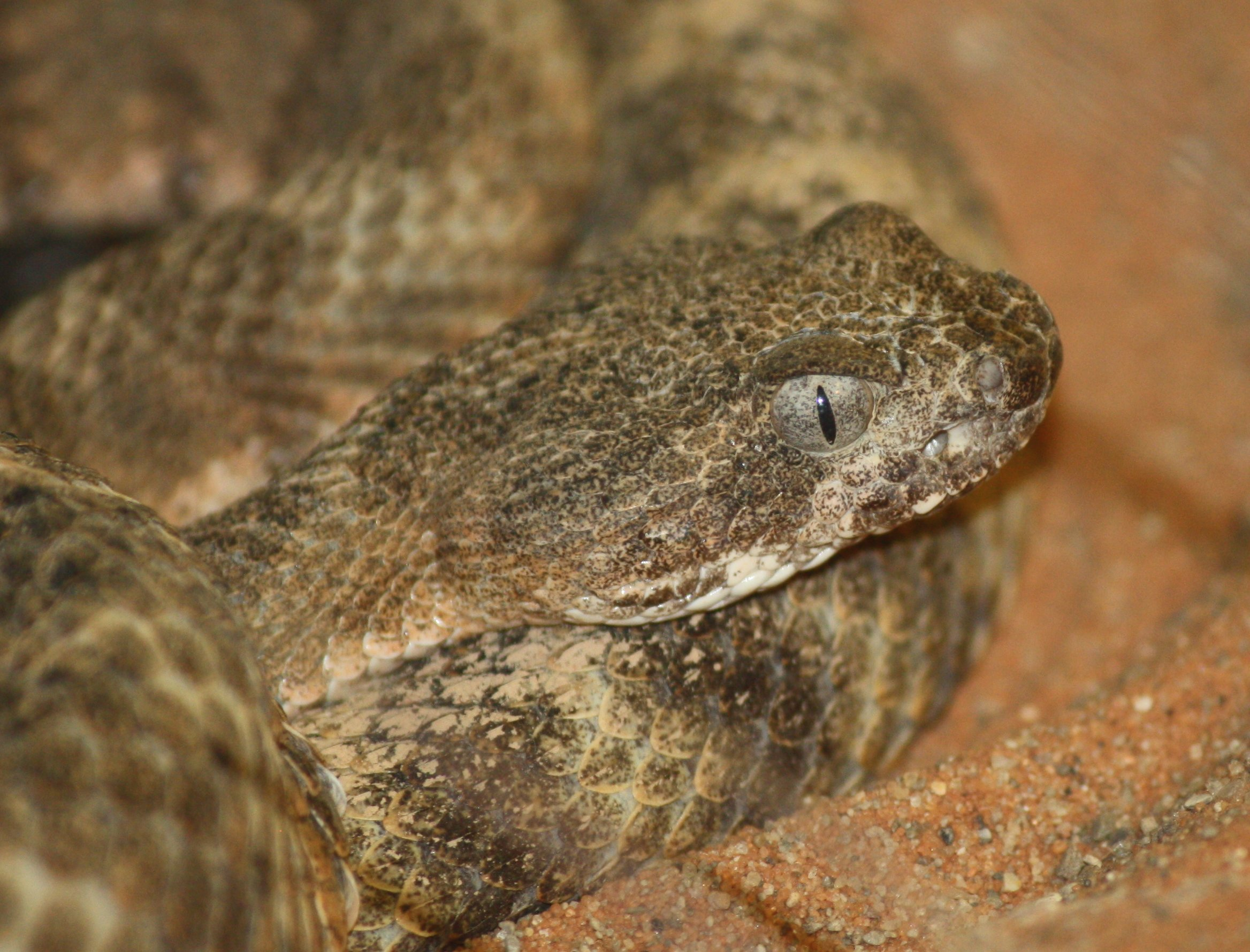
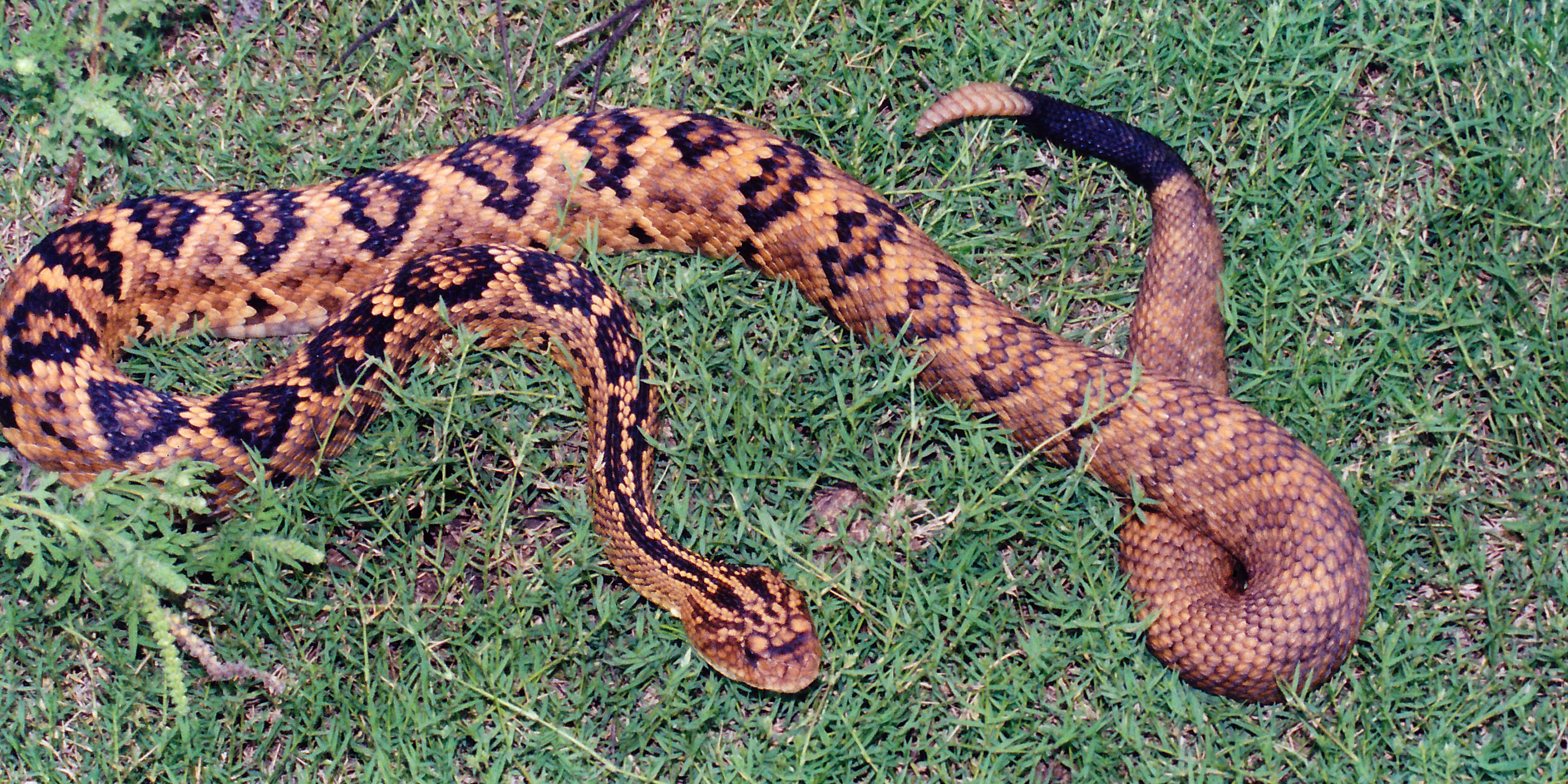
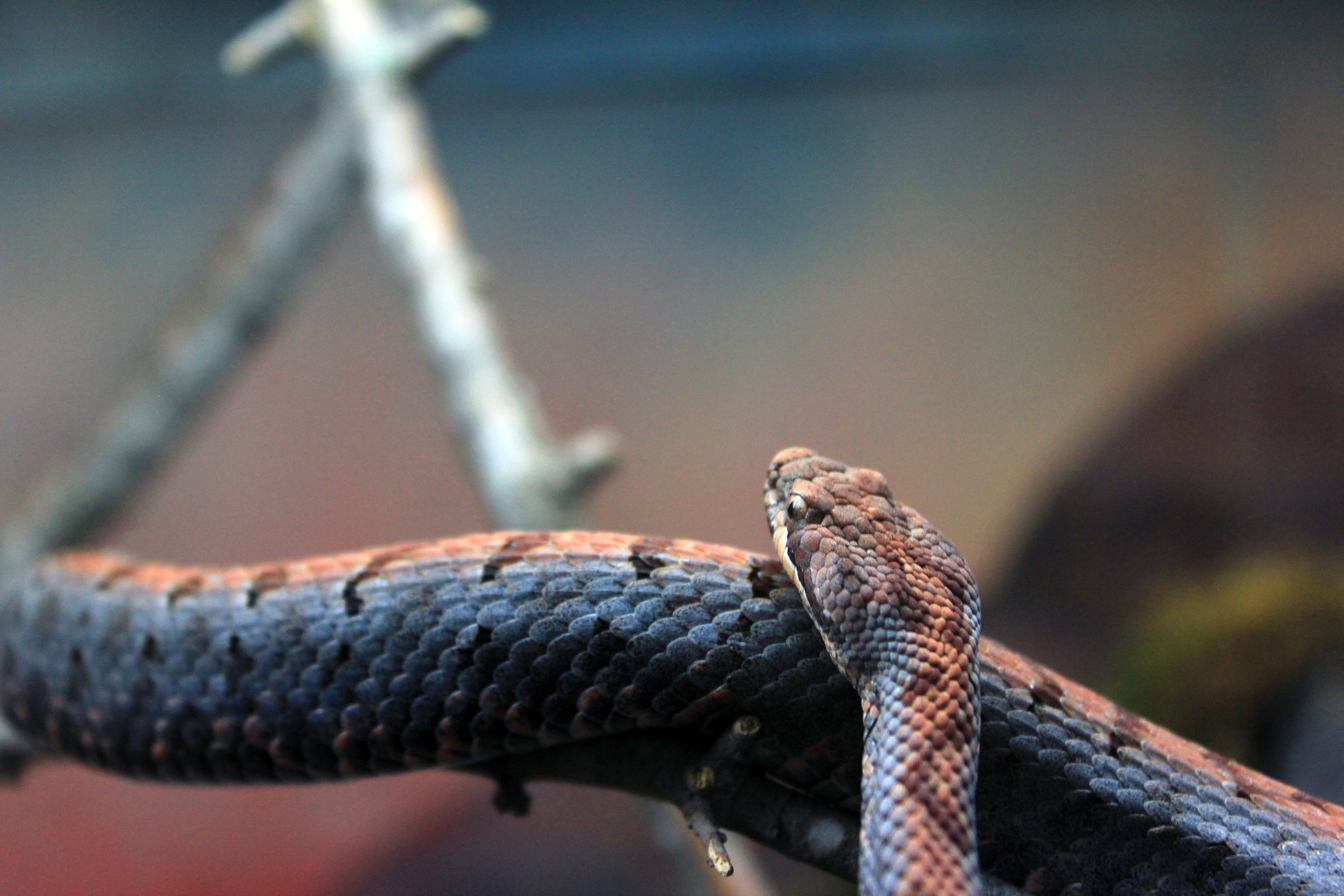
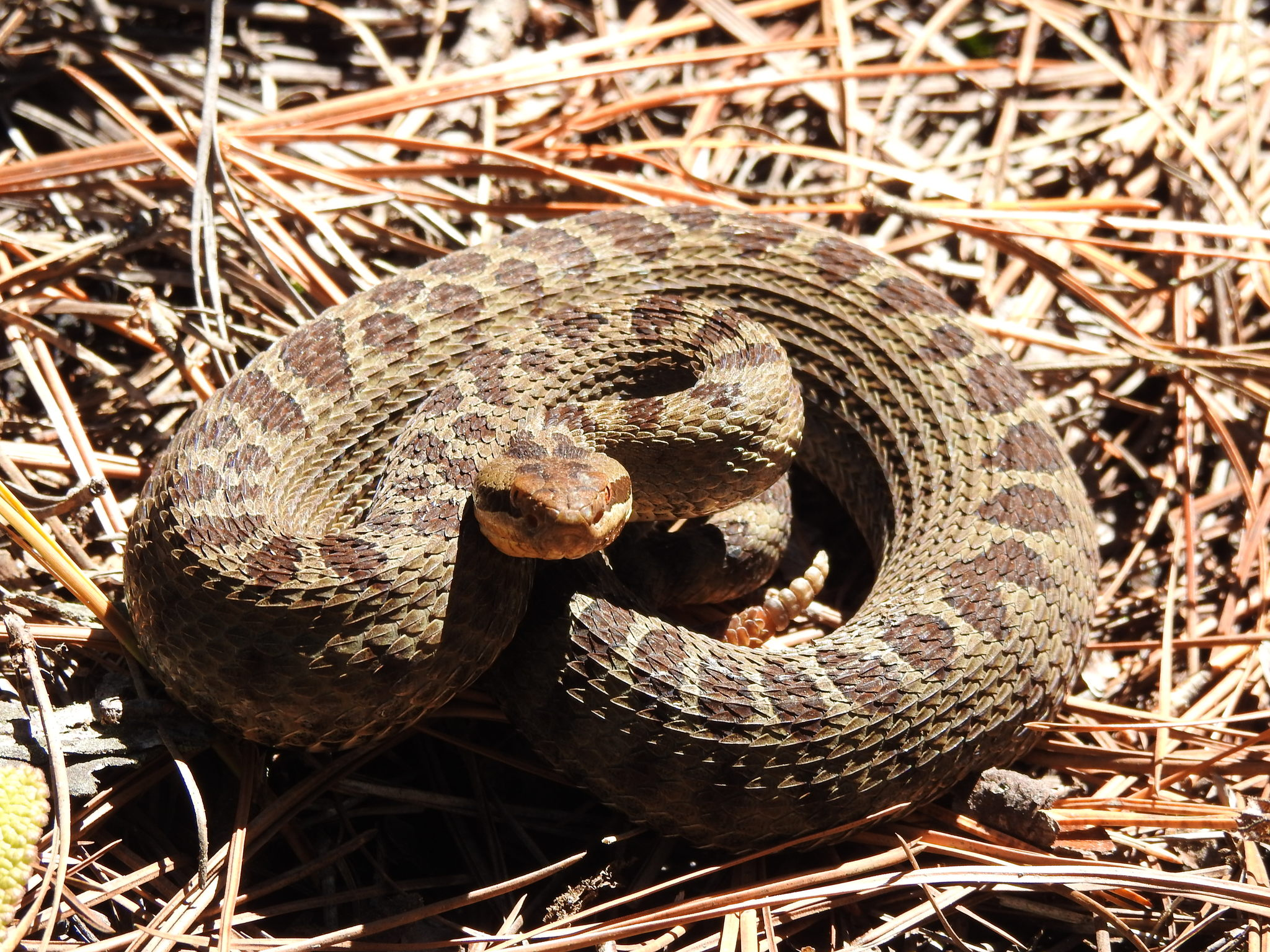
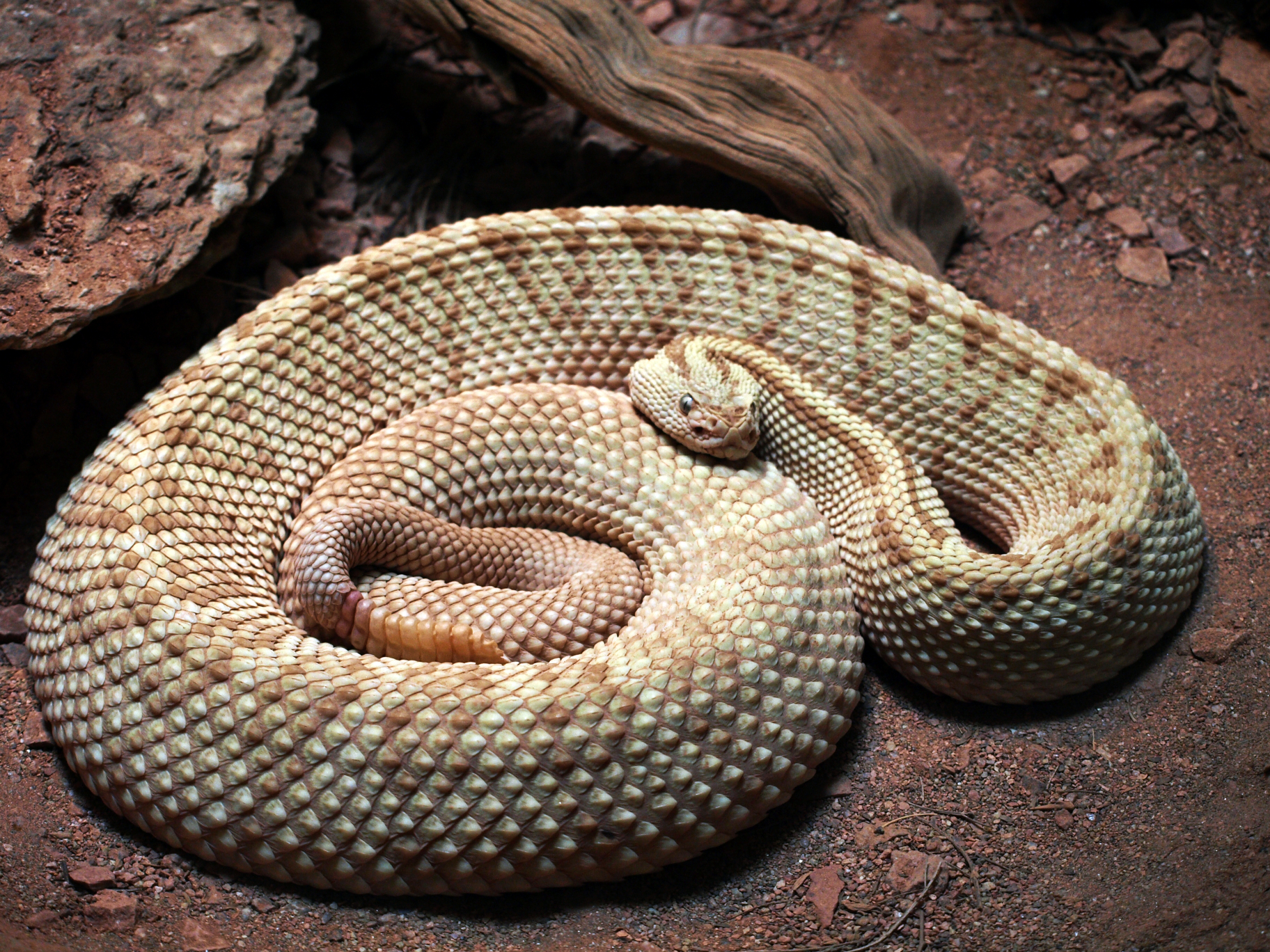
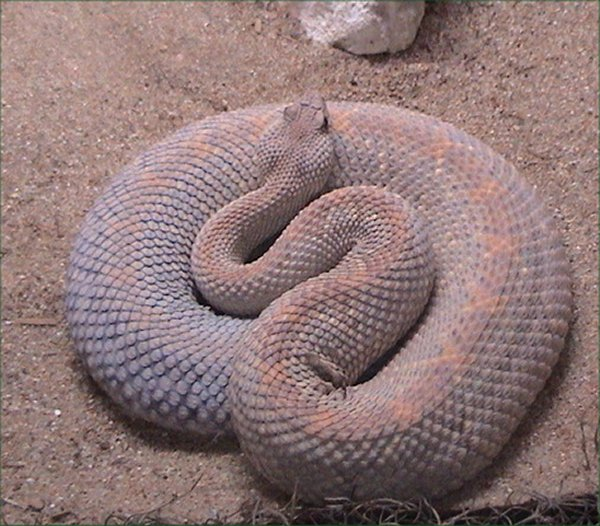
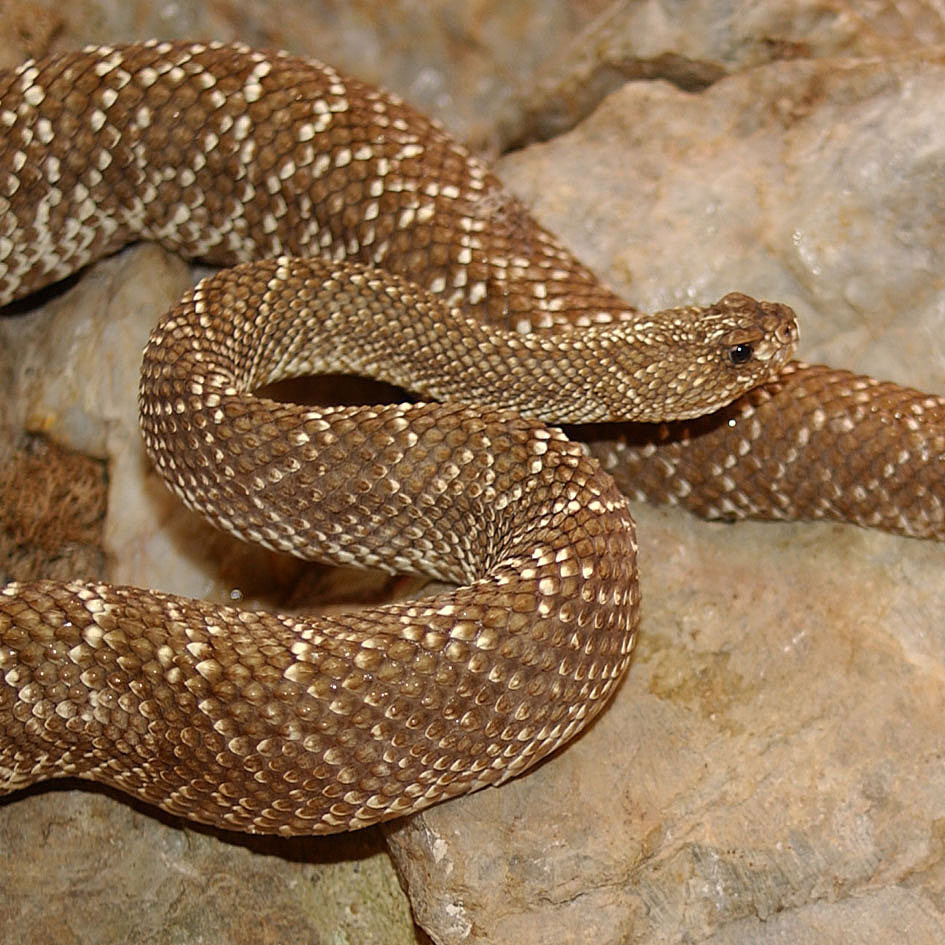
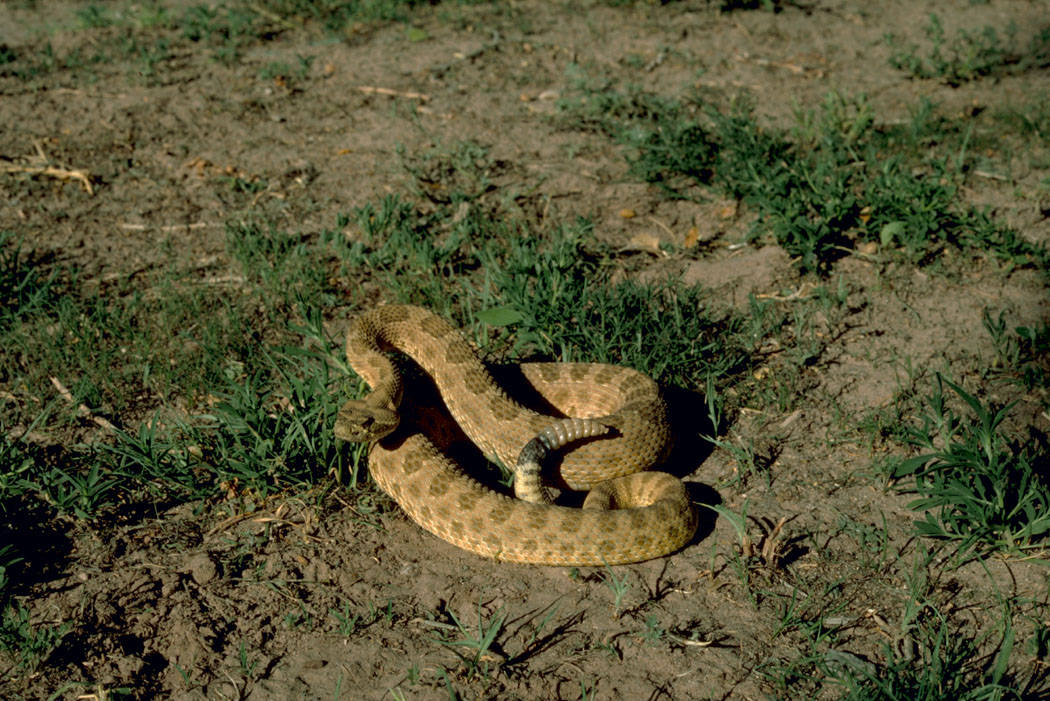
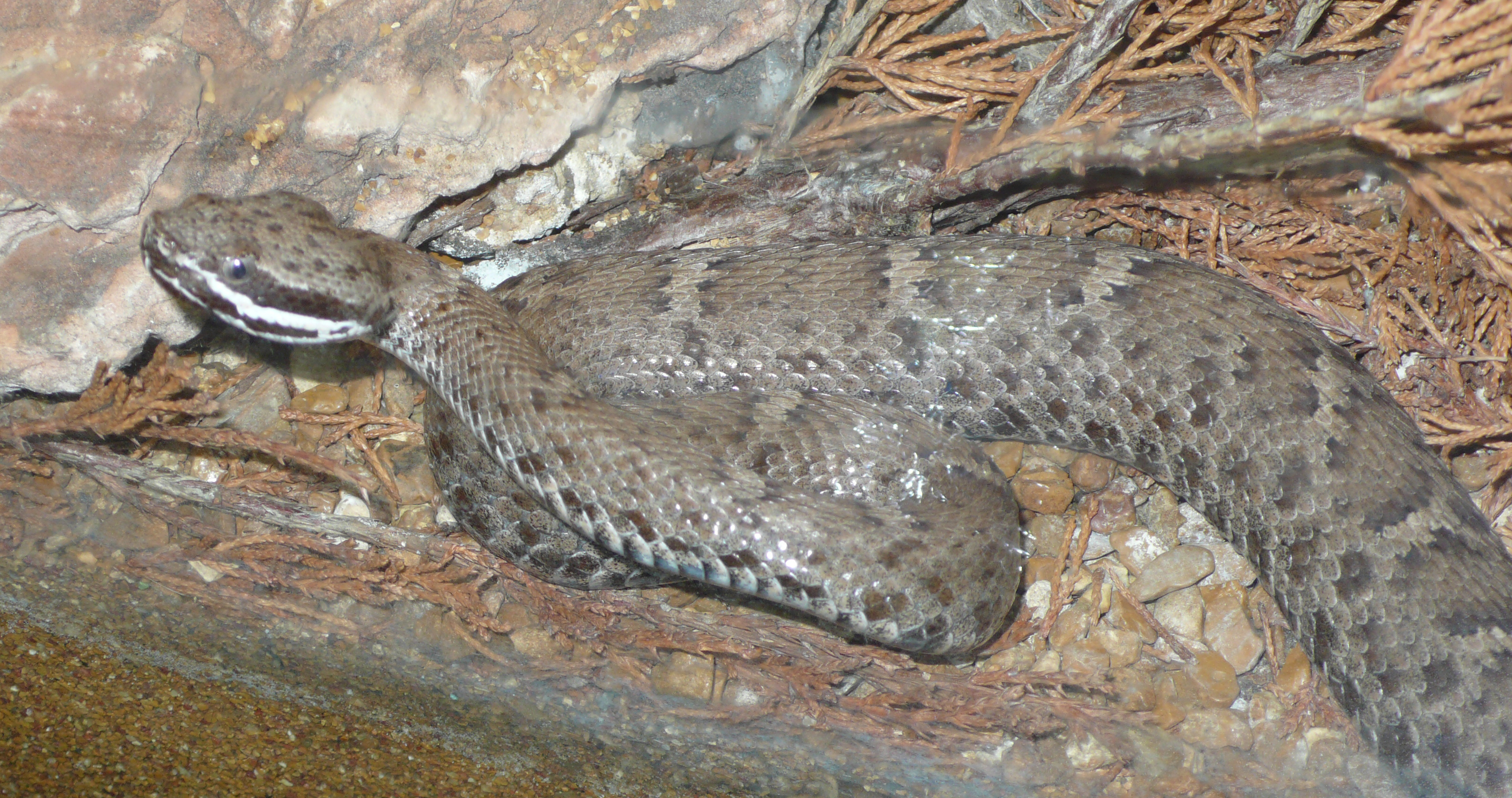
Image	Species	Taxon author	Subsp.*	Common name	Geographic range
	C. adamanteus	Palisot de Beauvois, 1799	0	Eastern diamondback rattlesnake	The southeastern United States from southeastern North Carolina, south along the coastal plain through peninsular Florida to the Florida Keys, and west along the Gulf Coast through southern Mississippi to southeastern Louisiana
	C. angelensis	Klauber, 1963	0	Angel de la Guarda Island speckled rattlesnake	Isla Ángel de la Guarda in the Gulf of California, Mexico
	C. aquilus	Klauber, 1952	0	Querétaro dusky rattlesnake	The highlands of central Mexico: Guanajuato, Hidalgo State of Mexico, Michoacán, and San Luis Potosí
	C. armstrongi	Campbell, 1979	0	Western dusky rattlesnake	Mexico: Jalisco and Nayarit
	C. atrox	Baird & Girard, 1853	0	Western diamondback rattlesnake	The Southwestern United States from central Arkansas and southeastern California, south into Mexico as far as northern Sinaloa, Hidalgo, and northern Veracruz, disjunct populations in southern Veracruz and southeastern Oaxaca
	C. basiliscus	(Cope, 1864)	0	Mexican west coast rattlesnake	Western Mexico from southern Sonora to Michoacán
	C. campbelli	Bryson, Linkem, Dorcas, Lathrop, Jones, Alvarado-Diaz, Grünwald & Murphy, 2014	0	Campbell's rattlesnake	Mexico: western Jalisco, northwestern Colima
	C. catalinensis	Cliff, 1954	0	Santa Catalina rattlesnake	Isla Santa Catalina in the Gulf of California (western Mexico)
	C. cerastes	Hallowell, 1854	3	Sidewinder, Horned rattlesnake	The southwestern United States in the desert region of eastern California, southern Nevada, extreme southwestern Utah, and western Arizona, northwestern Mexico in western Sonora and eastern Baja California
	C. cerberus	(Coues, 1875)	0	Arizona black rattlesnake	Central Arizona to western New Mexico
	C. concolor	(Woodbury, 1929)	0	Midget faded rattlesnake	basins of the Colorado and Green Rivers in the United States
	C. culminatus	Klauber, 1952	0	Northwestern neotropical rattlesnake	Mexico in southwestern Michoacán, southern and western Morelos, Guerrero, and southwestern Oaxaca, probably in extreme western Puebla and possibly in the Mexican Federal District
	C. durissus	Linnaeus, 1758	7	South American rattlesnake	All South American countries except Chile and Ecuador (although the various populations are disjunct), some islands in the Caribbean
	C. ehecatl	Carbajal-Marquez, Cedeno-Vazquez, Martinez-Arce, Neri-Castro, & Machkour-M'rabet, 2020	0	Tehuantepec Isthmus Neotropical rattlesnake	Mexico: (Chiapas, Oaxaca)
	C. enyo	(Cope, 1861)	2	Baja California rattlesnake	Western Mexico on the Baja California Peninsula from around Río San Telmo on the west coast and from opposite Isla Ángel de la Guarda on the Gulf Coast, south to Cabo San Lucas, on the following islands in the Gulf of California: San Marcos, Carmen, San José, San Francisco, Partida del Sur, Espírita Santo, and Cerralvo, off the Pacific coast on Isla Santa Margarita
	C. ericsmithi	Campbell & Flores-Villela, 2008	0	Guerreran long-tailed rattlesnake	Western Mexico: Guerrero
	C. estebanensis	Klauber, 1949	0	San Esteban Island rattlesnake	Mexico: Isla San Esteban (Gulf of California)
	C. helleri	(Meek, 1905)	0	Southern Pacific rattlesnake	SW California, Baja California, Mexico
	C. horridus^{T}	Linnaeus, 1758	0	Timber rattlesnake	The eastern United States from southern Minnesota and southern Maine, south to east Texas and north Florida, in southern Canada in southern Ontario
	C. intermedius	Troschel, 1865	2	Mexican small-headed rattlesnake	Central and southern Mexico, in southeastern Hidalgo, southern Tlaxcala, northeastern and south-central Puebla, west-central Veracruz, Oaxaca and Guerrero
	C. lannomi	W. Tanner, 1966	0	Autlán rattlesnake	Western Mexico in Jalisco
	C. lepidus	(Kennicott, 1861)	2	Rock rattlesnake	The southwestern United States in Arizona, southern New Mexico, and southwestern Texas, south into north-central Mexico
	C. lorenzoensis	Radcliffe & Maslin, 1975	0	San Lorenzo Island red diamond rattlesnake	Mexico, San Lorenzo Island in the Gulf of California
	C. lutosus	(Klauber, 1930)	0	Great Basin rattlesnake	Great Basin between the Rocky Mountains and the Sierra Nevada
	C. mictlantecuhtli	Carbajal-Marquez, Cedeno-Vazquez, Martinez-Arce, Neri-Castro, & Machkour-M'rabet, 2020	0	Veracruz Neotropical rattlesnake	Mexico: (Veracruz)
	C. mitchellii	(Cope, 1861)	1	Speckled rattlesnake	Mexico: most of Baja California Sur and on a number of islands in the Gulf of California and on Isla Santa Margarita off the Pacific coast of Baja California Sur
	C. molossus	Baird & Girard, 1853	3	Black-tailed rattlesnake	The southwestern United States (Arizona, south-western New Mexico), and Mexico from Sonora and western Chihuahua as far south as Oaxaca, in the Gulf of California on San Esteban Island and Tiburón Island
	C. morulus	Klauber, 1952	0	Tamaulipan rock rattlesnake	Mexico (Sierra Madre Oriental: Tamaulipas, Nuevo León, Coahuila)
	C. oreganus	Holbrook, 1840	0	Western rattlesnake	Southwestern Canada (southern British Columbia), south through the northwestern half of the United States (Washington, Oregon, western and southern Idaho, California
	C. ornatus	Hallowell, 1854	0	Eastern black-tailed rattlesnake	The southwestern United States (New Mexico, western and central Texas) and north-eastern Mexico (Chihuahua, Coahuila)
	C. polisi	Meik, Schaack, FloreS-Villela, & Streicher, 2018	0	Horsehead Island speckled rattlesnake	Cabeza de Caballo Island, Baja California, Mexico
	C. polystictus	(Cope, 1865)	0	Mexican lance-headed rattlesnake	Central Mexican Plateau, from southern Zacatecas and northeastern Colima east to east-central Veracruz
	C. pricei	Van Denburgh, 1895	1	Twin-spotted rattlesnake	In the US from southeastern Arizona, and Mexico in northern Sonora southeast through Chihuahua, Durango, southeastern Coahuila, and Nuevo León into Tamaulipas
	C. pusillus	Klauber, 1952	0	Tancitaran dusky rattlesnake	West-central Mexico in southwestern and west-central Michoacán and adjacent Jalisco, probably also in northeastern Colima
	C. pyrrhus	Cope, 1867	0	Southwestern speckled rattlesnake	Southwestern United States (western Arizona, southern California, southern Nevada, extreme south-western Utah) and northwestern Mexico (Baja California del Norte, northwestern Sonora)
	C. ravus	(Cope, 1865)	3	Mexican pygmy rattlesnake	The mountains of central and southern Mexico, west of the Isthmus of Tehuantepec, in the southeastern part of the Mexican Plateau, in the highlands of Morelos, Tlaxcala, Puebla, Veracruz, Oaxaca, and the Sierra Madre del Sur in Guerrero
	C. ruber	Cope, 1892	2	Red diamond rattlesnake	The US in southwestern California, south through the Baja California Peninsula, except in the desert east of the Sierra de Juárez, also on a number of islands in the Gulf of California and three islands off the west coast of Baja California Sur
	C. scutulatus	(Kennicott, 1861)	1	Mojave rattlesnake	The southwestern US in southern California, southern Nevada, extreme southwestern Utah, most of Arizona, southern New Mexico, and West Texas, and south into Mexico to southern Puebla
	C. simus	Latreille In Sonnini & Latreille, 1801	0	Middle American rattlesnake	From Mexico in southwestern Michoacán on the Pacific coast, and Veracruz and the Yucatán Peninsula on the Atlantic coast, south through Belize, Guatemala, El Salvador, Honduras, and Nicaragua to west-central Costa Rica
	C. stejnegeri	Dunn, 1919	0	Long-tailed rattlesnake	Western Mexico in eastern Sinaloa, western Durango, and probably northern Nayarit
	C. stephensi	Klauber, 1930	0	Panamint rattlesnake	United States: eastern California, southwestern Nevada
	C. tancitarensis	Alvarado-Diaz & Campbell, 2004	0	Tancitaro rattlesnake	Mexico: Michoacán
	C. thalassoporus	Meik, Schaack, FloreS-Villela, & Streicher, 2018	0	Louse Island speckled rattlesnake	Piojo Island, Baja California, Mexico
	C. tigris	Kennicott in Baird, 1859	0	Tiger rattlesnake	The southwestern US in south-central Arizona, and in northwestern Mexico in Sonora, on Isla Tiburón in the Gulf of California
	C. tlaloci	Bryson, Linkem, Dorcas, Lathrop, Jones, Alvarado-Diaz, Grünwald & Murphy, 2014	0		Mexico: Michoacan and Guerrero
	C. totonacus	Gloyd & Kauffeld, 1940	0	Totonacan rattlesnake	Northeastern Mexico from central Nuevo León through southern Tamaulipas, northern Veracruz, eastern San Luis Potosí, and northern Querétaro.
	C. transversus	Taylor, 1944	0	Cross-banded mountain rattlesnake	Central Mexico in the State of Mexico and Morelos.
	C. triseriatus	(Wagler, 1830)	1	Mexican dusky rattlesnake	Mexico, along the southern edge of the Mexican Plateau in the highlands of the Transverse Volcanic Cordillera, including the states of Nayarit, Jalisco, Michoacán, Morelos, México, Puebla, Tlaxcala, and Veracruz
	C. tzabcan	Klauber, 1952	0	Yucatán neotropical rattlesnake	Mexico (Yucatán, Campeche, Quintana Roo, and eastern Tabasco), northern Guatemala and northern Belize
	C. unicolor	Klauber, 1936	0	Aruba rattlesnake	Aruba
	C. vegrandis	Klauber, 1941	0	Uracoan rattlesnake	Eastern Venezuela
	C. viridis	(Rafinesque, 1818)	3	Prairie rattlesnake	Southern Canada (Alberta, Saskatchewan), south through the US (eastern Idaho, Montana, North Dakota, South Dakota, Wyoming, Nebraska, Colorado, Kansas, Oklahoma, Texas, New Mexico, extreme eastern Arizona), and into northern Mexico (northern Coahuila, northwestern Chihuahua)
	C. willardi	Meek, 1905	5	Ridge-nosed rattlesnake	The US in southeastern Arizona and southwestern New Mexico, and northwestern Mexico in Sonora, Chihuahua, Durango, and Zacatecas

*) Not including the nominate subspecies
^{T}) Type species

== See also ==
- Snakebite
