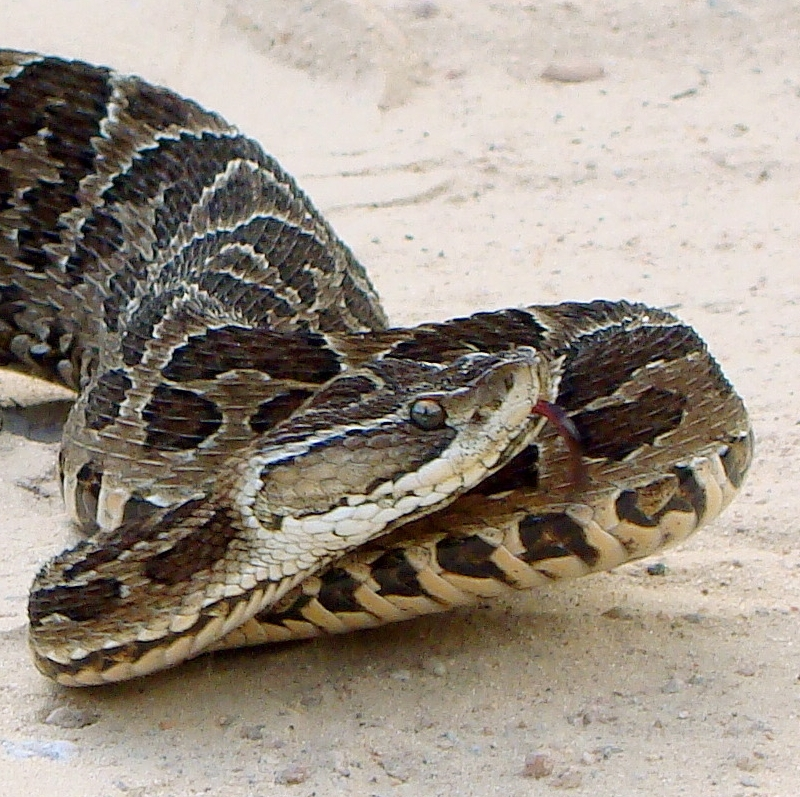
- Bothrops alternatus

Scientific classification
- Kingdom: Animalia
- Phylum: Chordata
- Class: Reptilia
- Order: Squamata
- Suborder: Serpentes
- Family: Viperidae
- Subfamily: Crotalinae
- Genus: Bothrops; Wagler, 1824

Synonyms
- Bothrops Wagler, 1824; Rhinocerophis Garman, 1881

= Bothrops =

Genus of snakes

Bothrops is a genus of highly venomous pit vipers endemic to the Neotropics. The generic name, Bothrops, is derived from the Greek words βόθρος, bothros, meaning "pit", and ὄψ, ops, meaning "eye" or "face", together an allusion to the heat-sensitive loreal pit organs. Members of this genus are responsible for more human deaths in the Americas than any other group of venomous snakes. Currently, 48 species are recognized.

== Description ==
Species in the genus Bothrops range in size from small, never growing to more than 50–70 cm (19.5–27.5 in), to large at over 200 cm (6.6 ft) in total length (tail included). Most are characterized by having a sharp canthus rostralis and an unelevated snout.

The arrangement of the scales on top of the head is extremely variable; the number of interorbital scales may be 3–14, with 7–9 supralabials and 9–11 sublabials. The snake has 21–29 rows of dorsal scales at midbody, 139–240 ventral scales, and 30–86 subcaudals, which are generally divided.

== Common names ==
Lacépède originally applied the common name "lanceheads" to all snakes in the genus Bothrops, which he considered conspecific. Thus, older writings, as well as popular and sometimes scientific writings (including the American Heritage, Merriam-Webster, and New Shorter Oxford dictionaries), still often call them fer-de-lance (French, "spearhead"). However, many scientists and hobbyists now restrict this name to the Martinican species, B. lanceolatus. Other common names include American lanceheads and American lance-headed vipers.

== Geographic range ==
Bothrops species are found in northeastern Mexico (Tamaulipas) southward through Central and South America to Argentina. They also occur on the islands of Saint Lucia and Martinique in the Lesser Antilles, as well as one species on Ilha da Queimada Grande off the coast of Brazil. B. atrox is also found on the island of Trinidad in the Caribbean off the eastern coast of Venezuela.

== Behavior ==
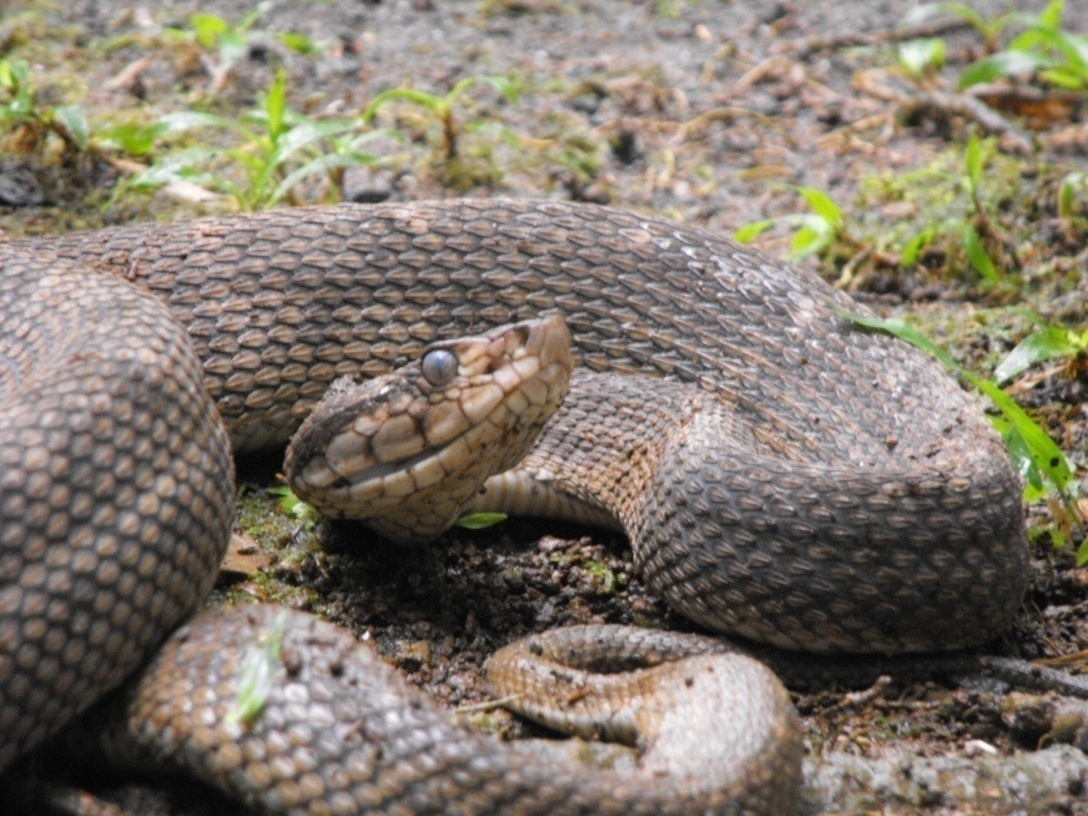
B. caribbaeus

Most species of Bothrops are nocturnal, although a few found at higher altitudes are active during the day. Otherwise, they may be seen on cloudy days or during periods of rain. Most are terrestrial, though all are capable of climbing. One species, B. insularis, which is endemic to Ilha da Queimada Grande, is considered to be semiarboreal. This species, unlike most Bothrops, preys primarily on birds, due to the absence of native mammal species on Queimada Grande. This feeding habit probably accounts for their more arboreal lifestyle compared with their mainland cogenerics. Many species of Bothrops exhibit tail vibration behavior when disturbed.

== Venom ==
Members of the genus Bothrops are responsible for more fatalities in the Americas than any other group of venomous snakes. In this regard, the most important species are B. asper, B. atrox, and B. jararaca. Without treatment, the fatality rate is estimated to be about 7.0%, but with treatment, this is reduced to 0.5–3.0%.

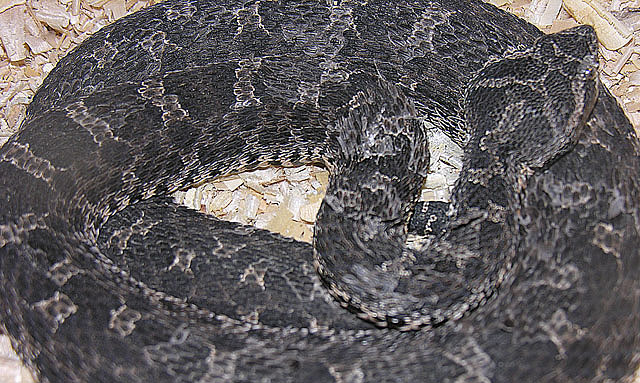
Bothrops ammodytoides

Typical symptoms of bothropic envenomation include immediate burning pain, dizziness, nausea, vomiting, sweating, headache, massive swelling of the bitten extremity, hemorrhagic blebs, local necrosis, bleeding from the nose and gums, ecchymosis, erythemia, hypotension, tachycardia, coagulopathy with hypofibrinogenemia and thrombocytopenia, hematemesis, melena, epistaxis, hematuria, intracerebral hemorrhage, and kidney failure, secondary to hypotension and bilateral cortical necrosis. Usually, some discoloration is seen around the bite site, and rashes may develop on the torso or the extremities.

In general, death results from hypotension secondary to blood loss, kidney failure, and intracranial hemorrhage. Common complications include necrosis and kidney failure secondary to shock and the toxic effects of the venom.

== Species ==
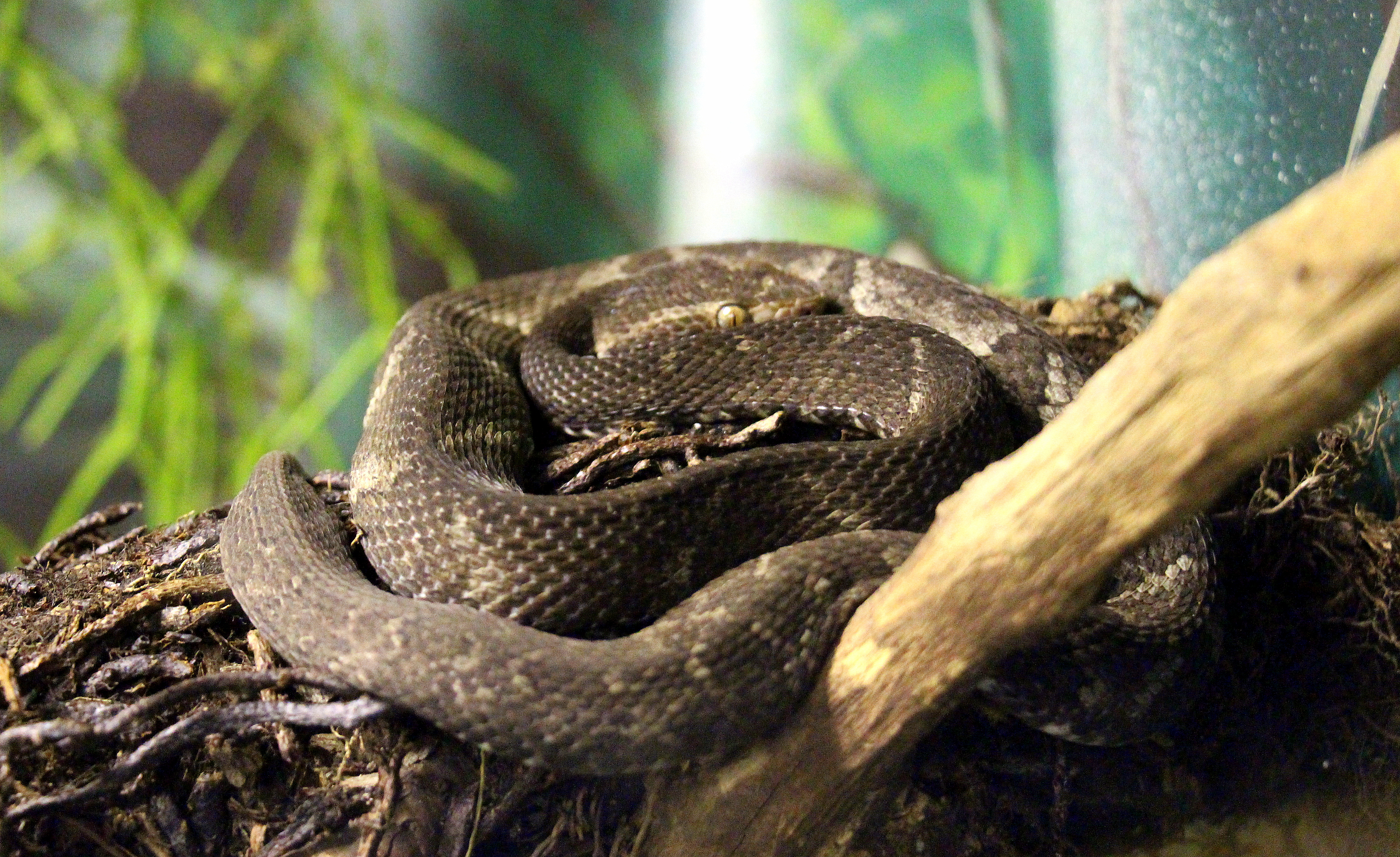
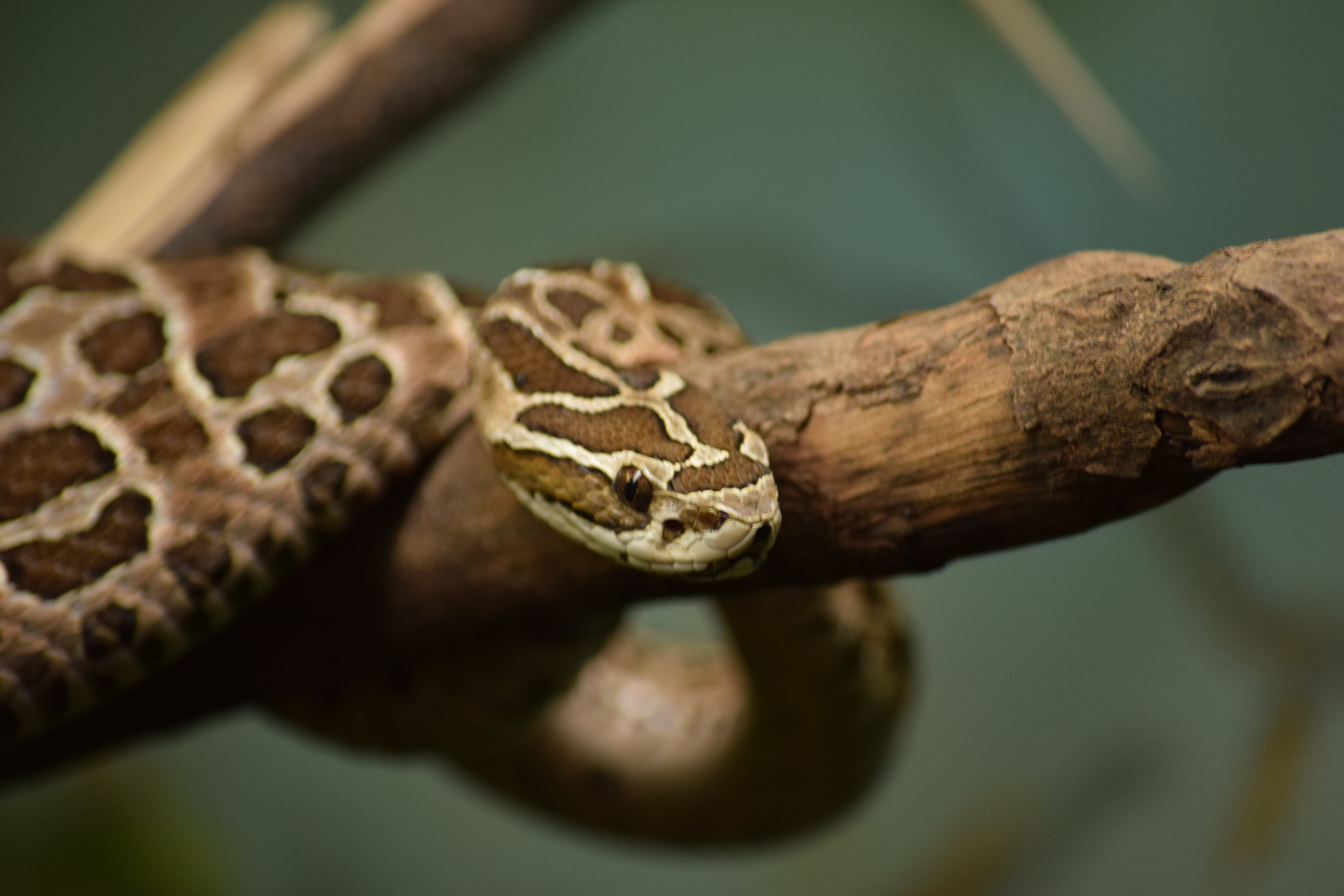
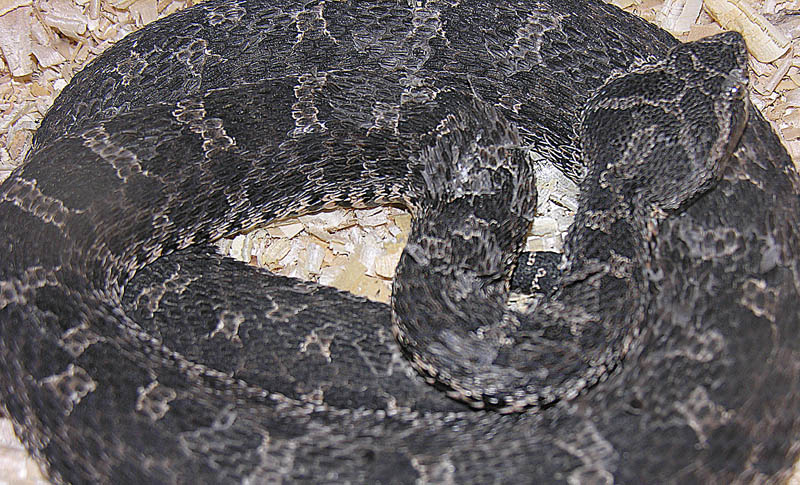
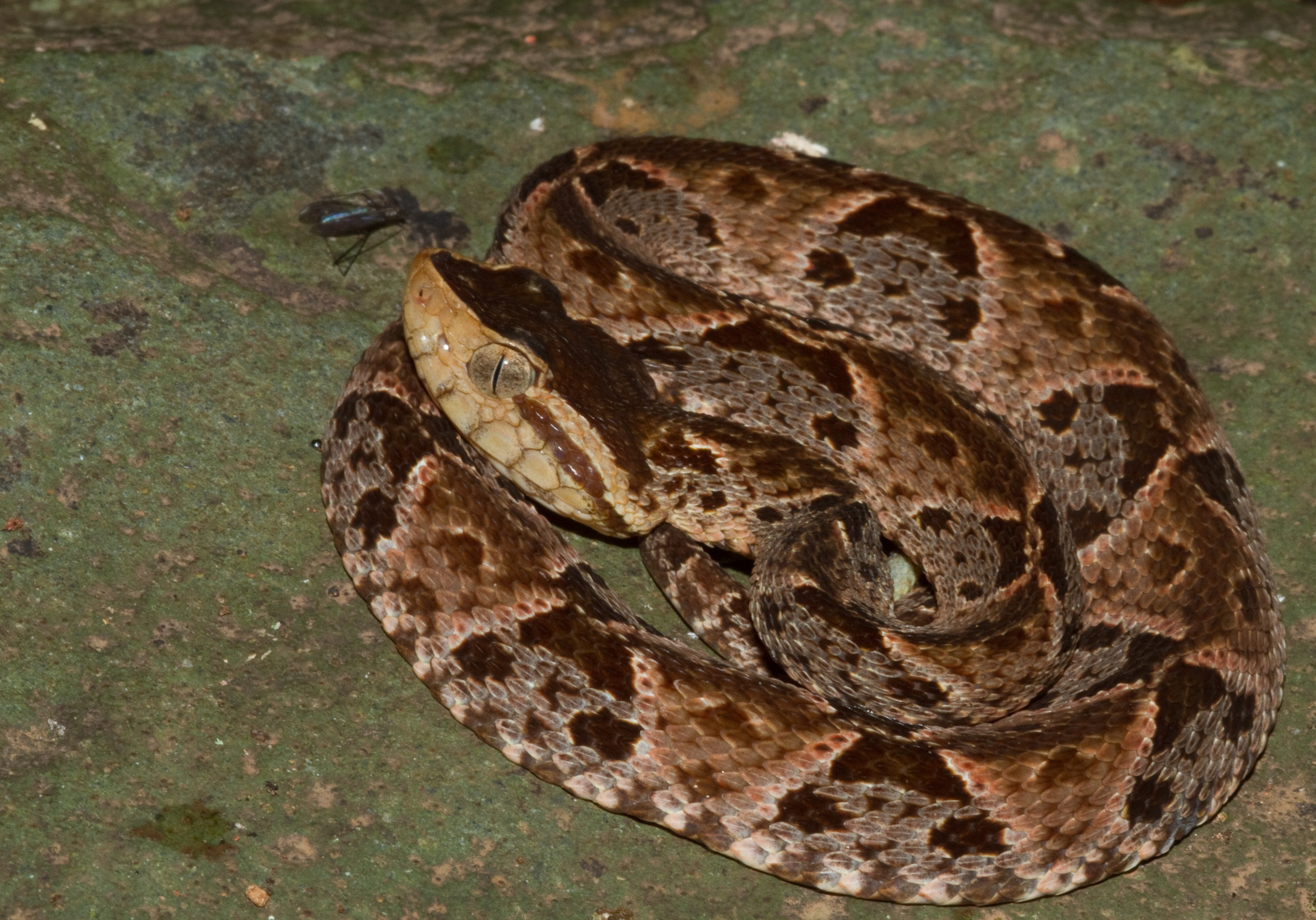
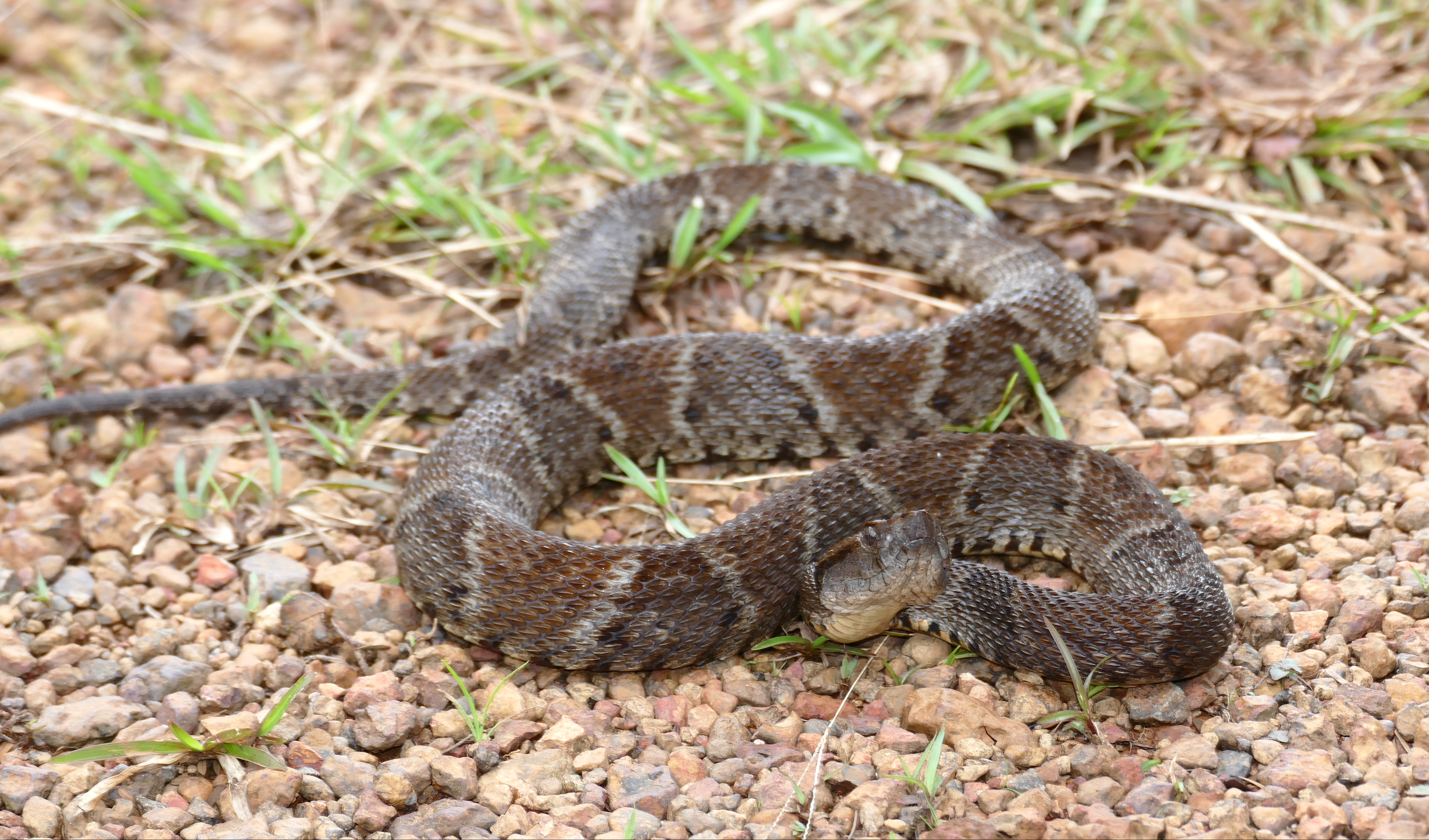
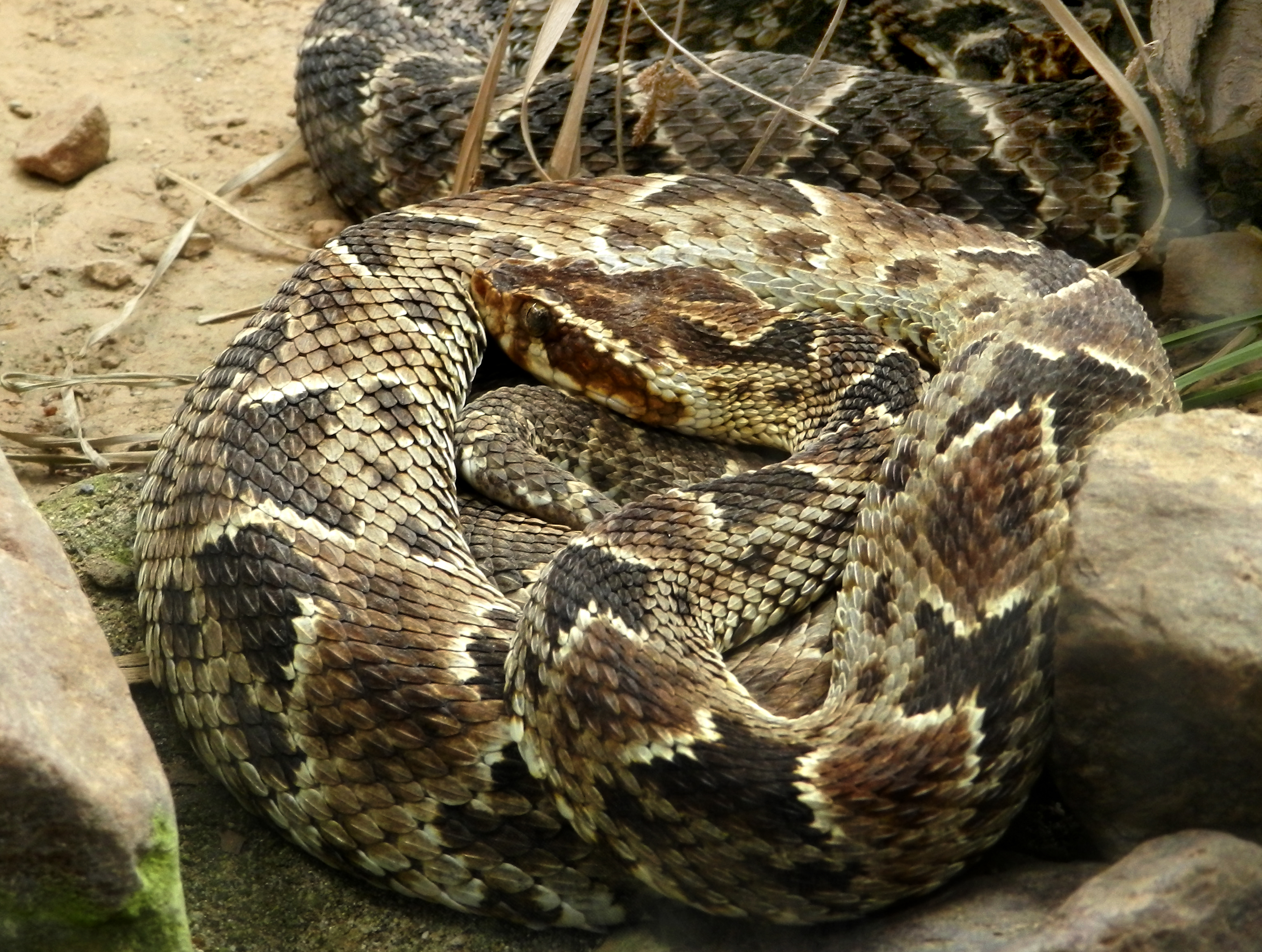
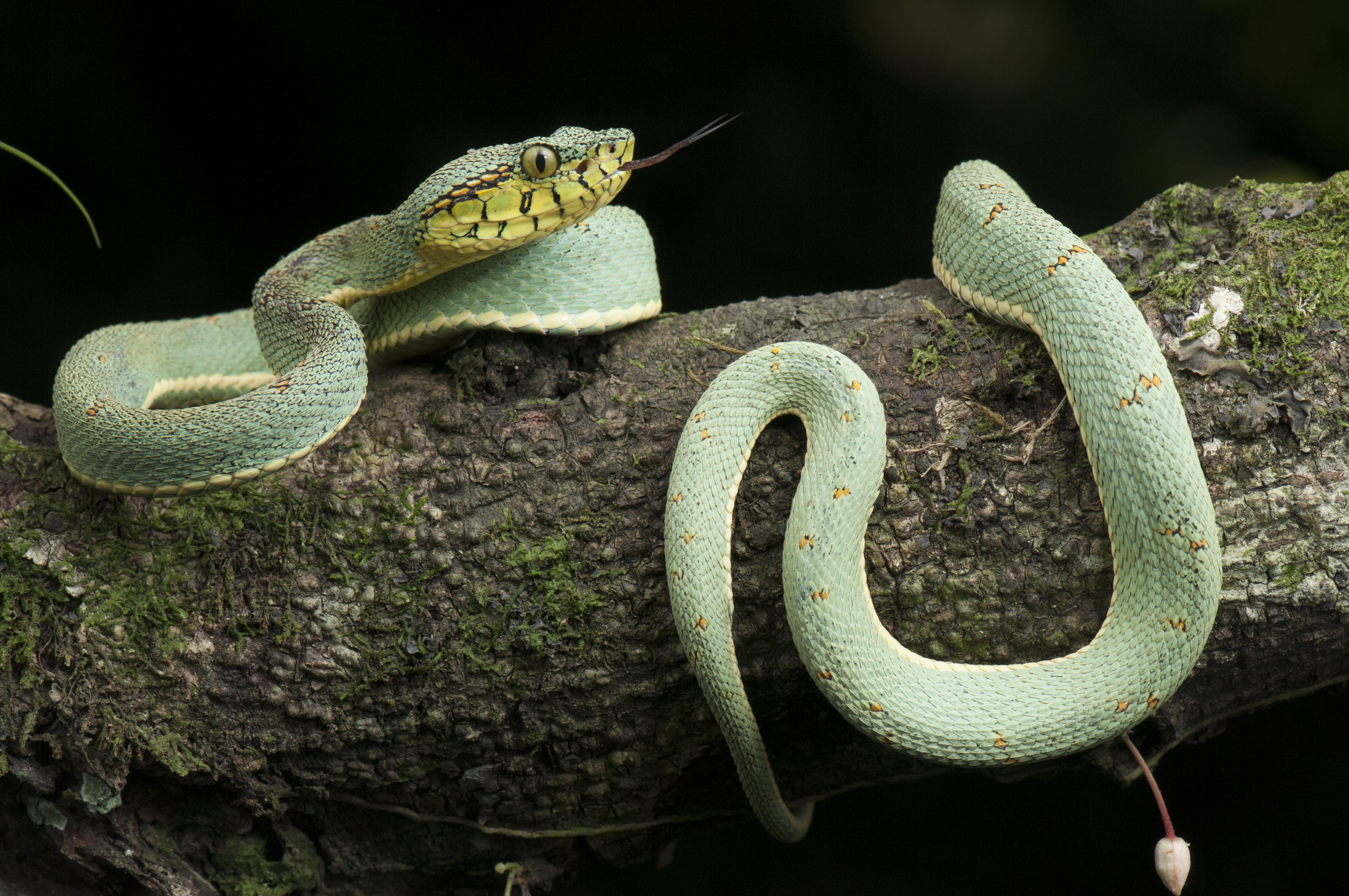
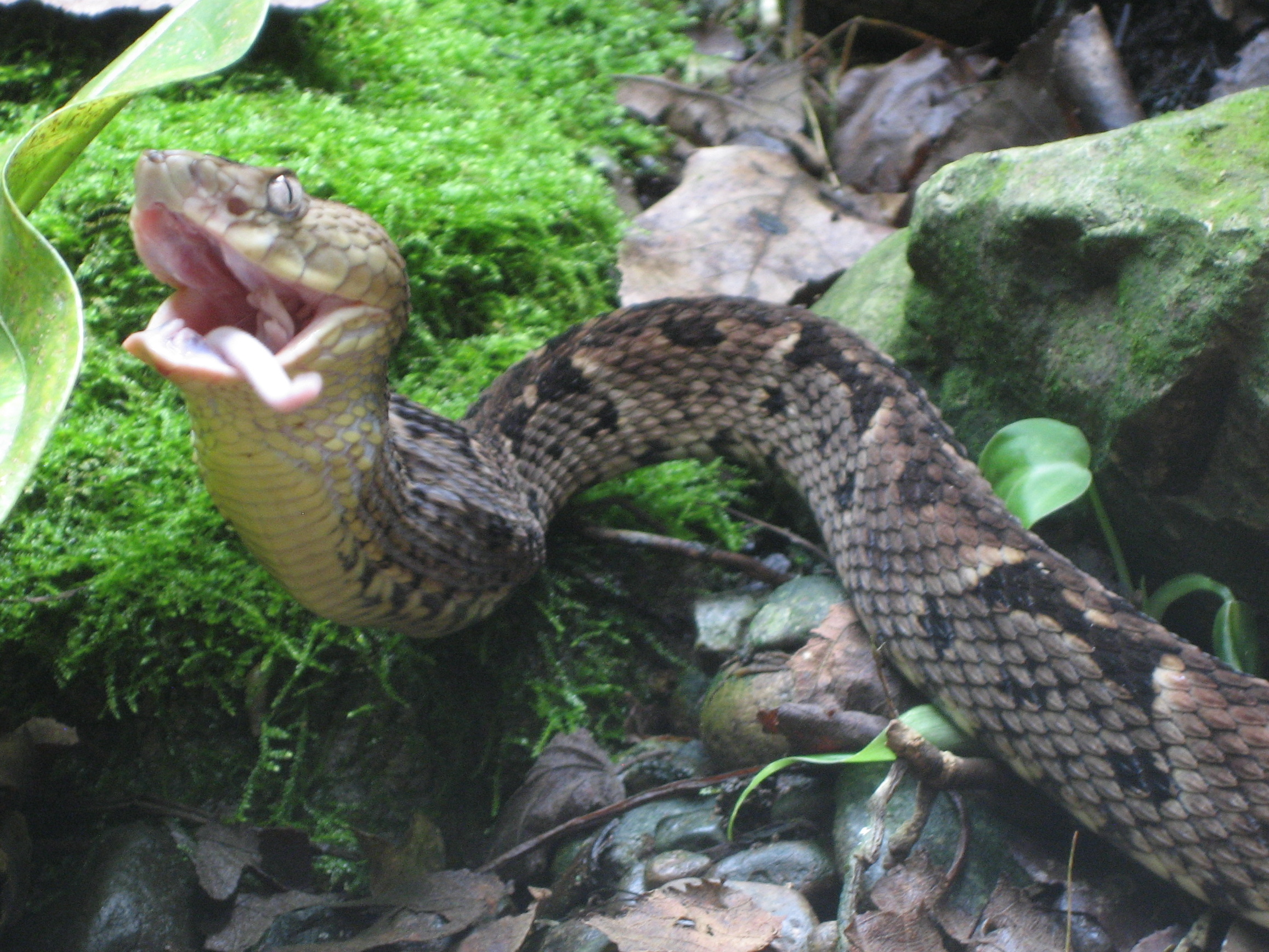
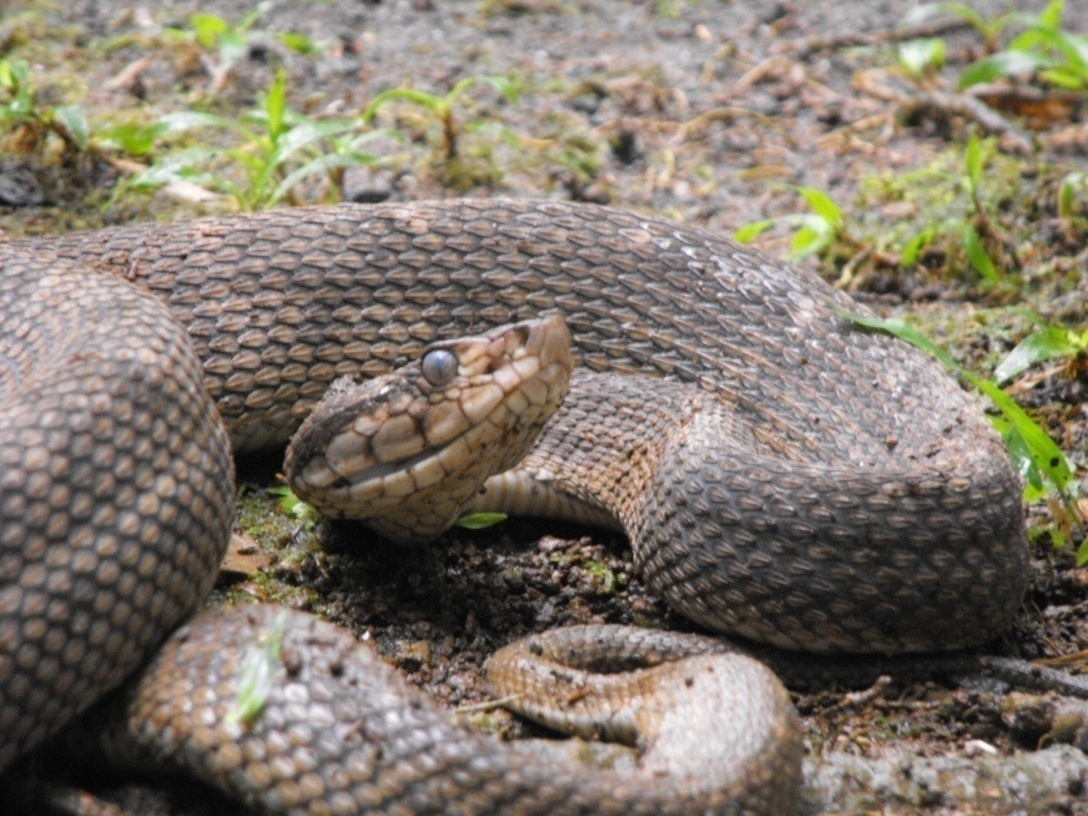
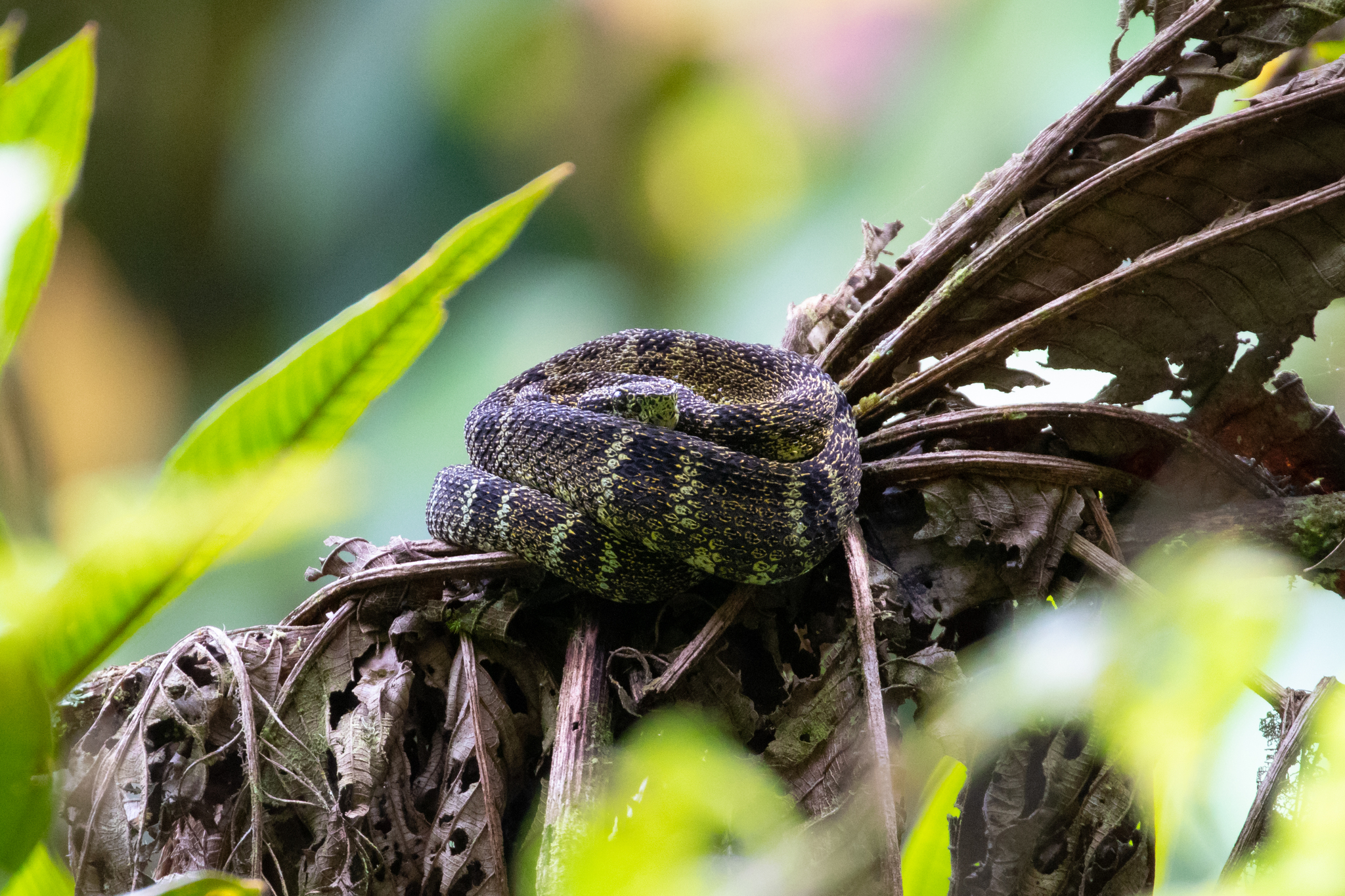
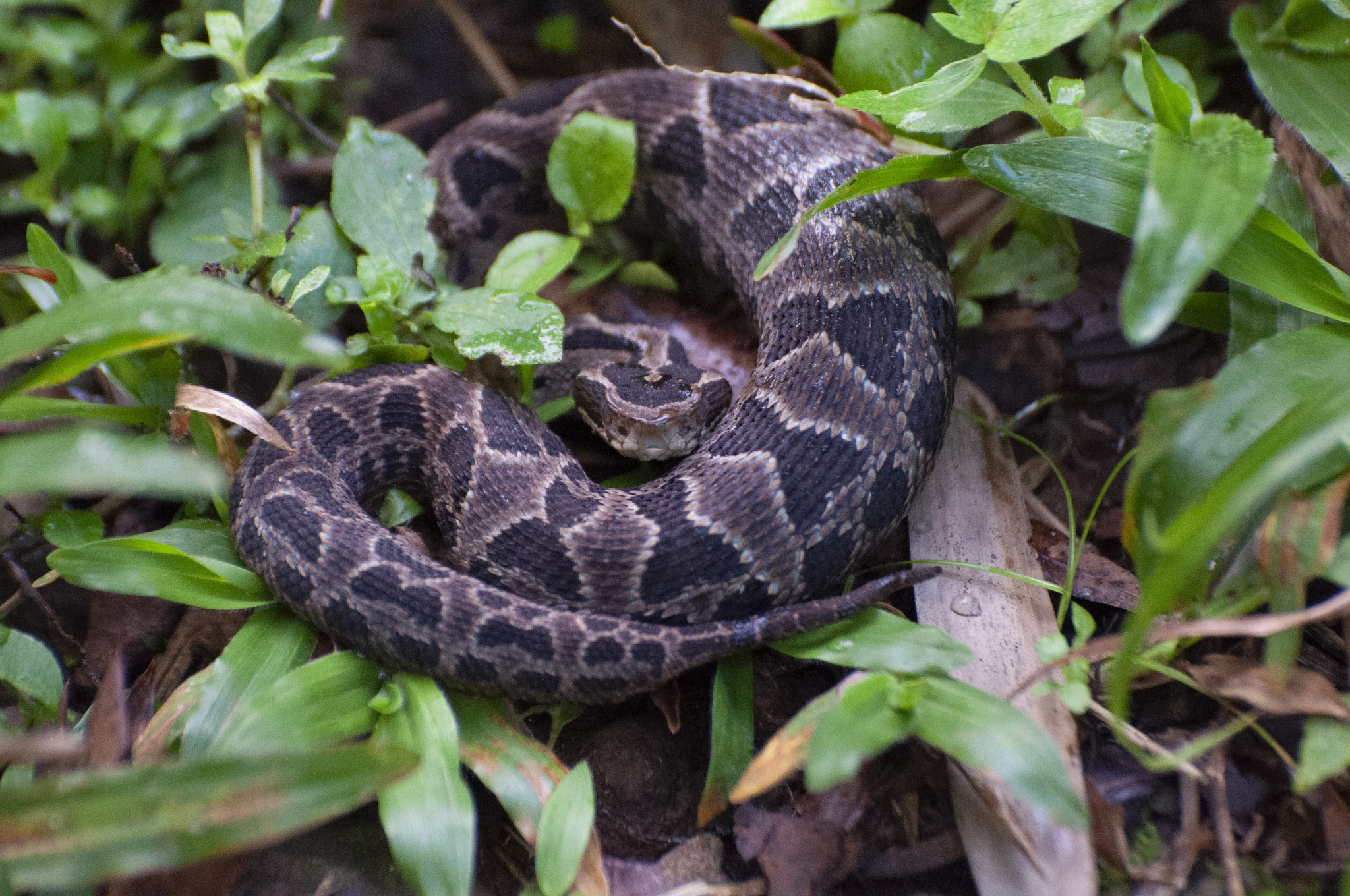
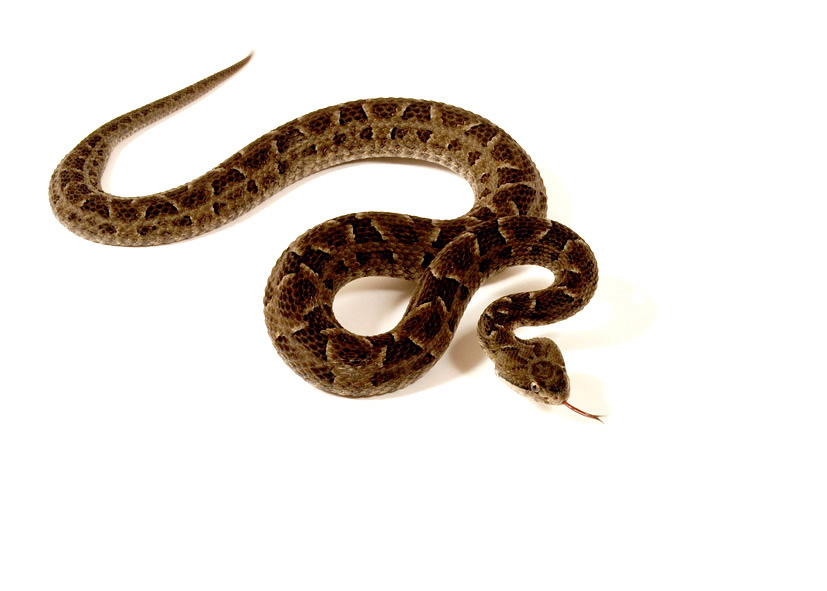
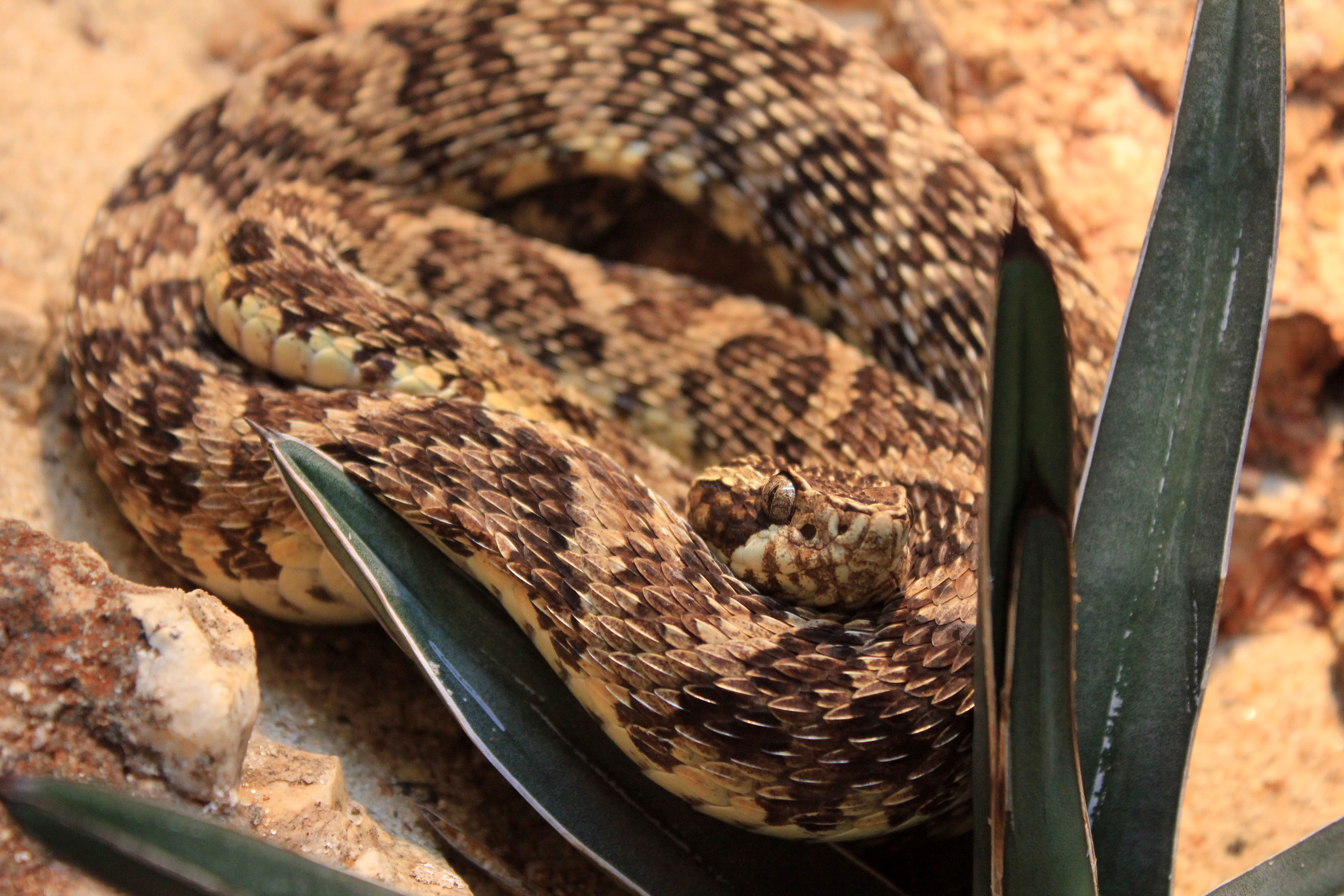
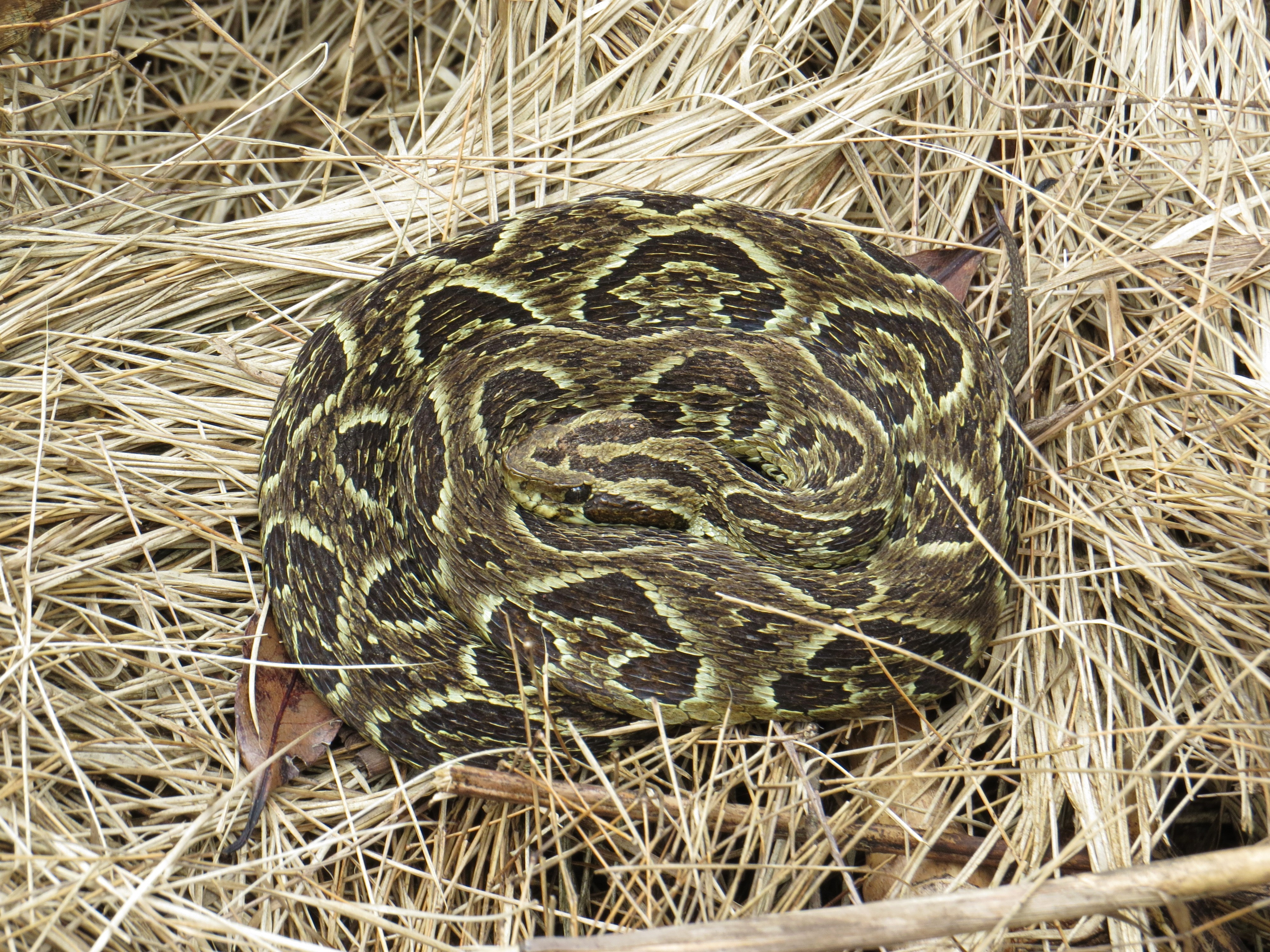
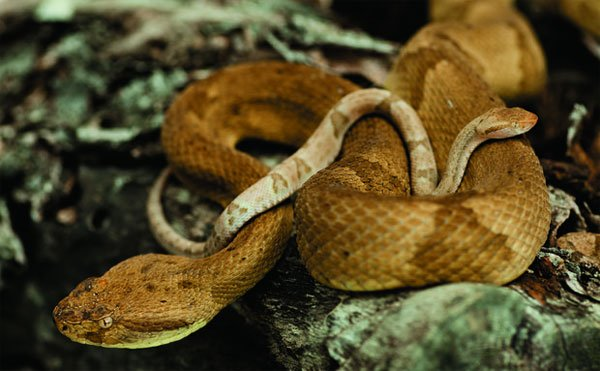
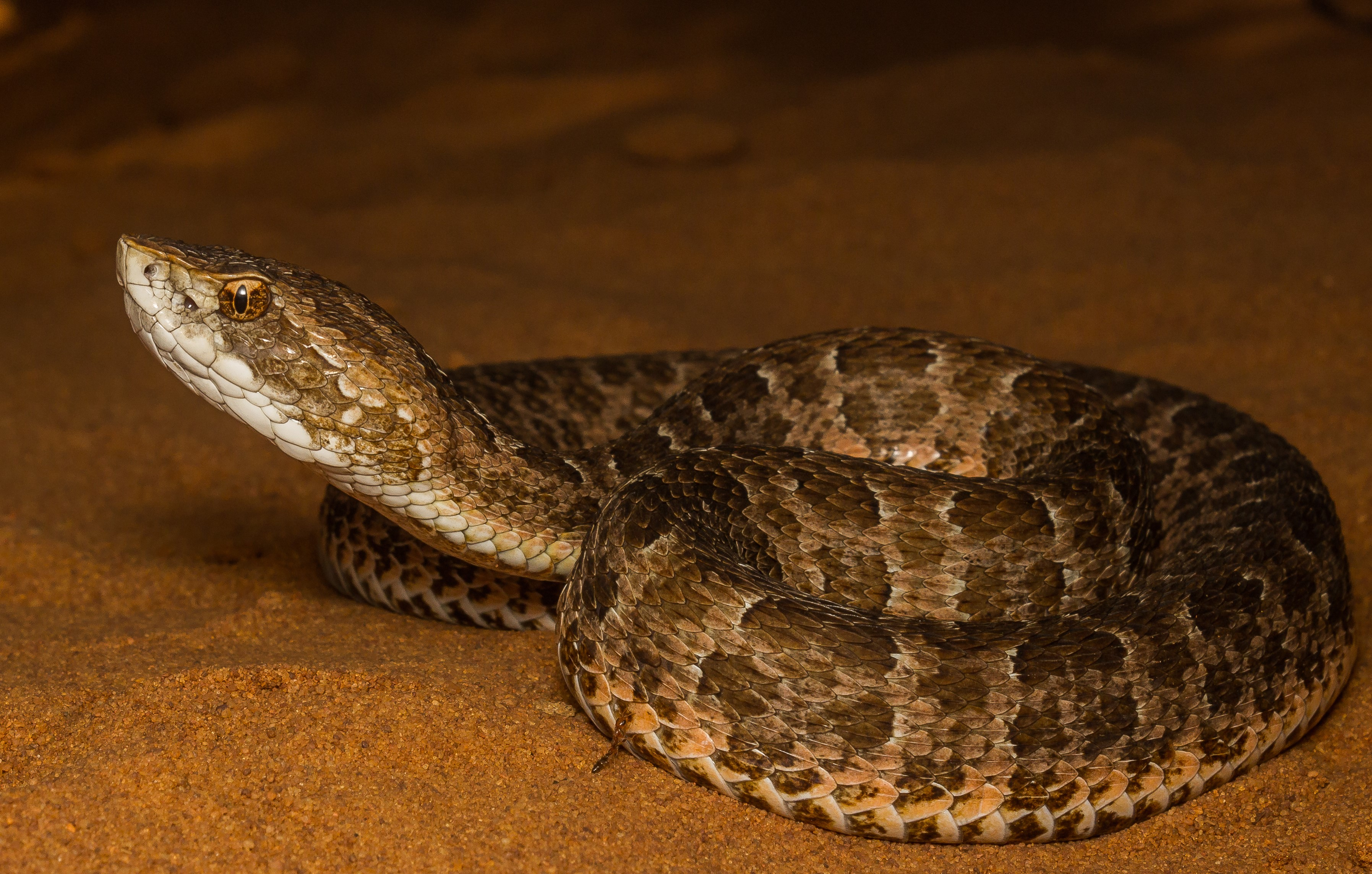
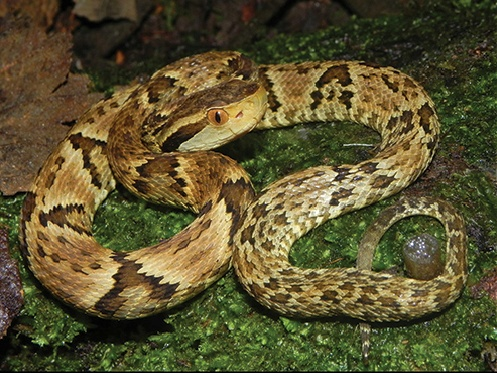
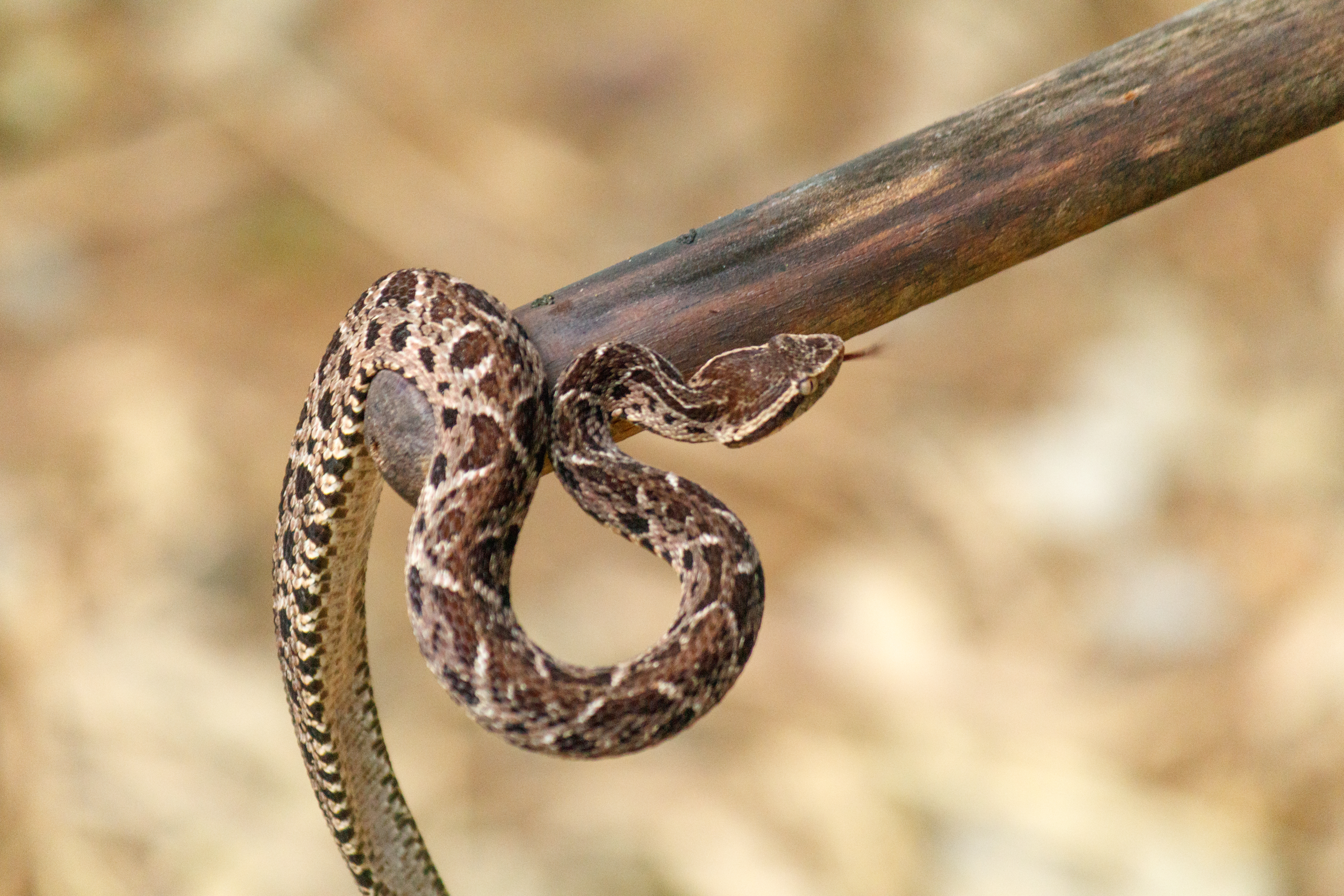
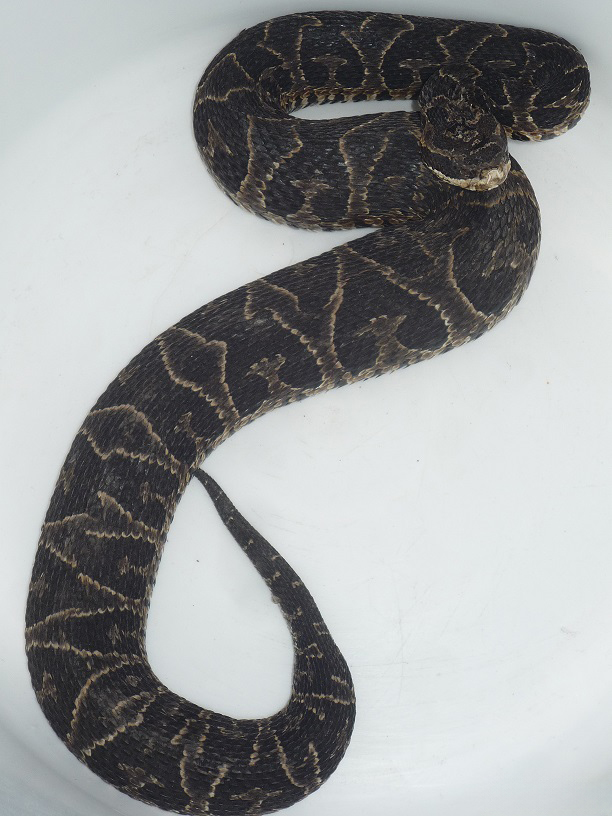
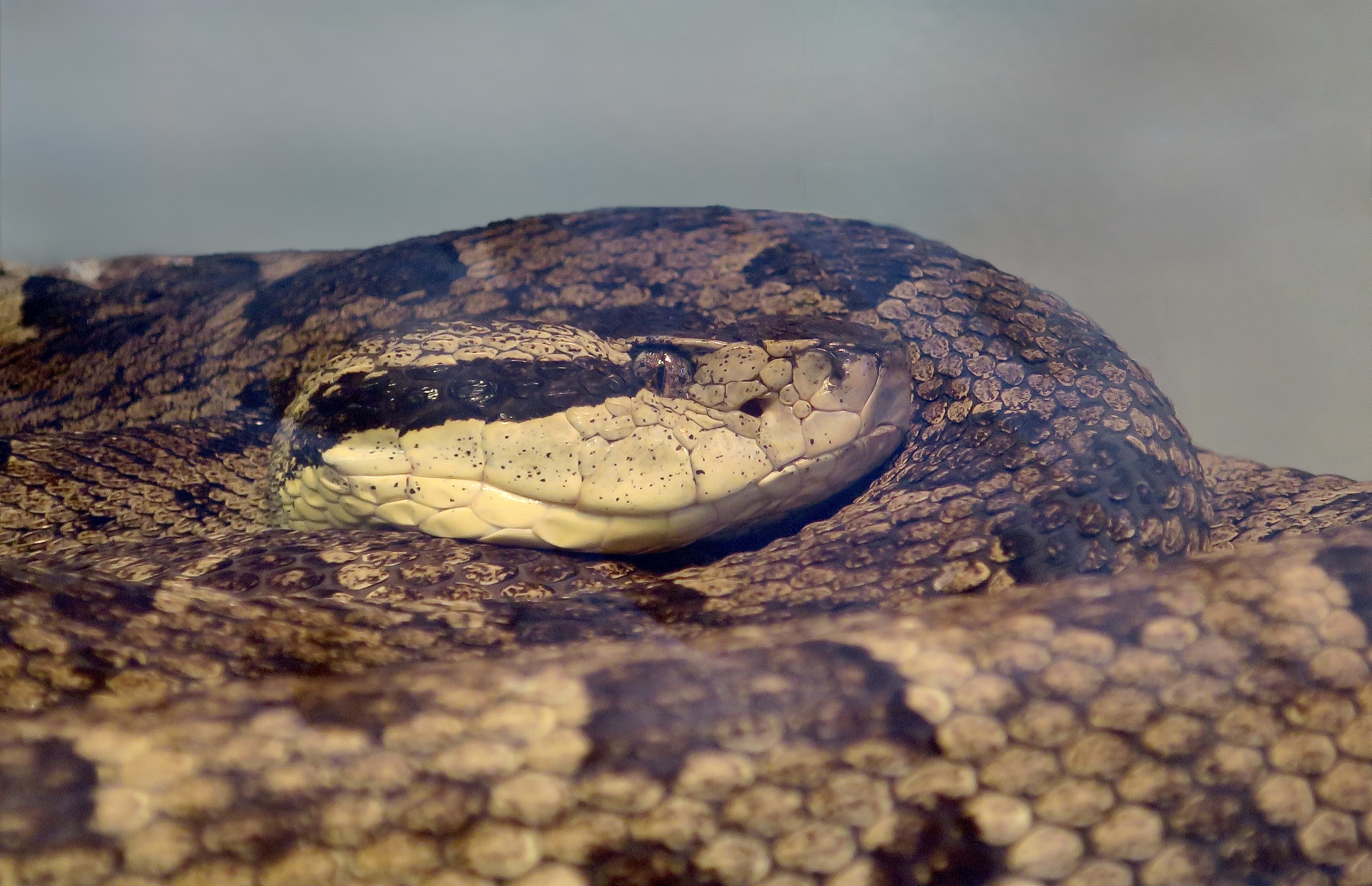
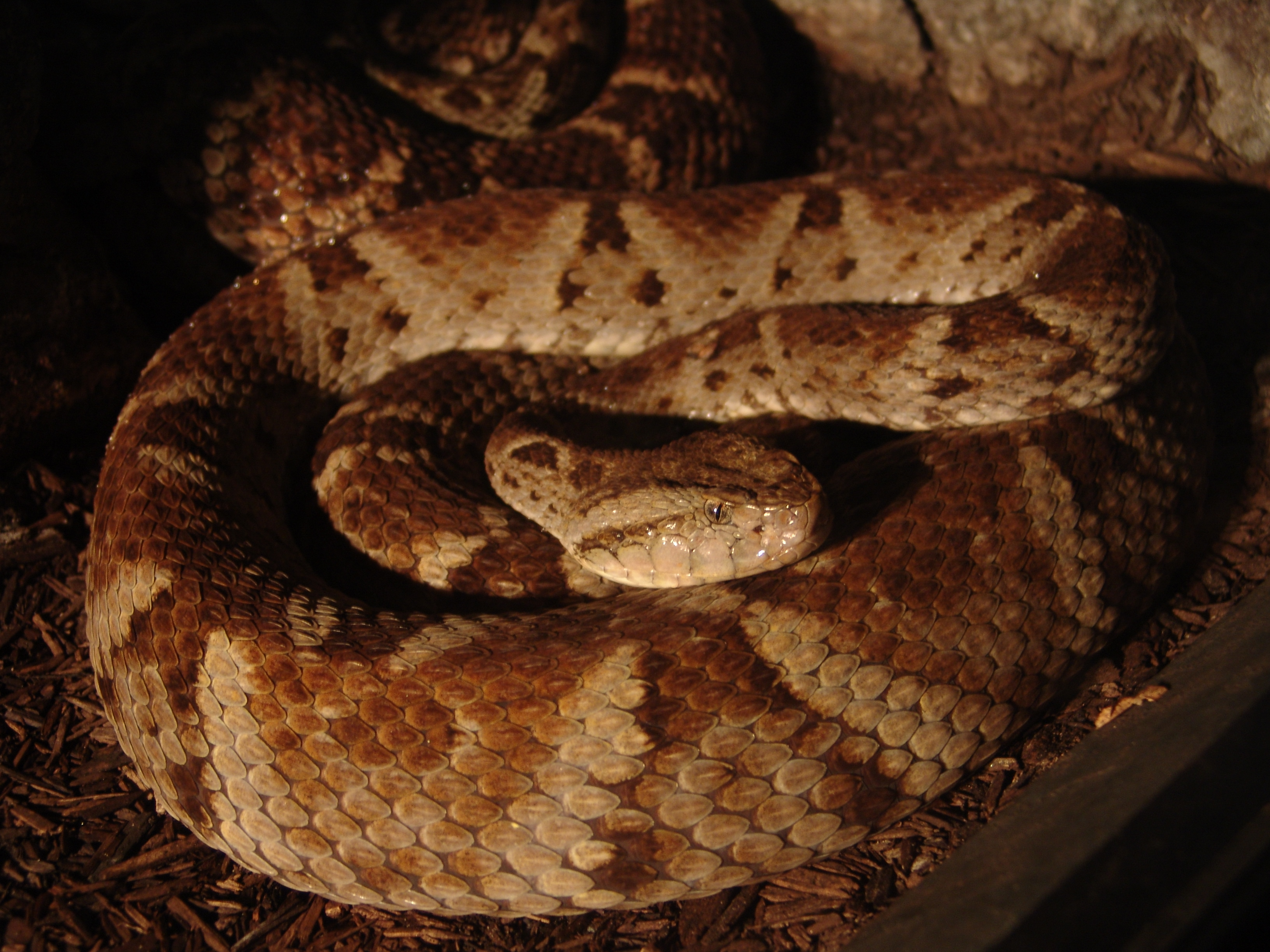
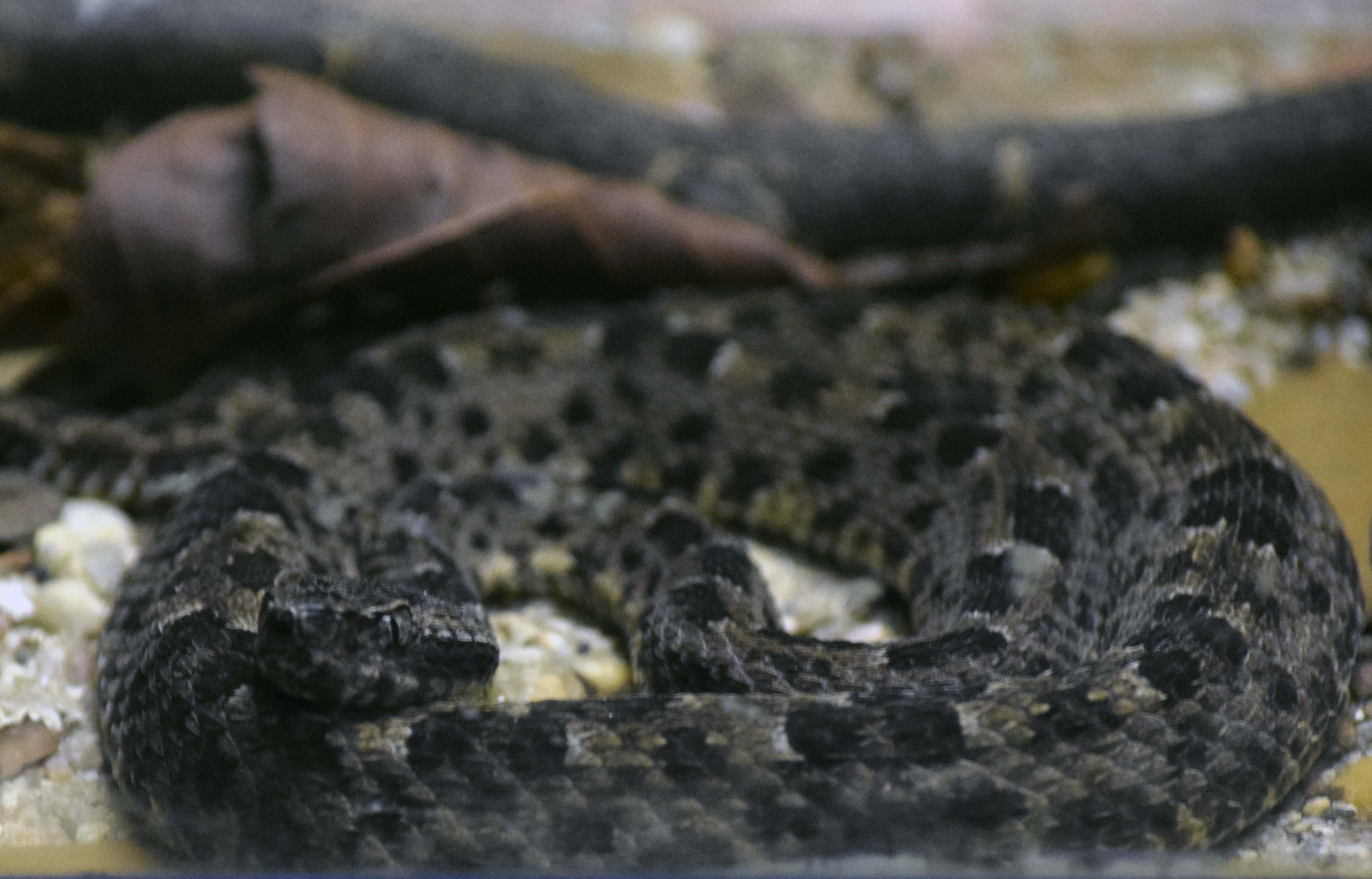
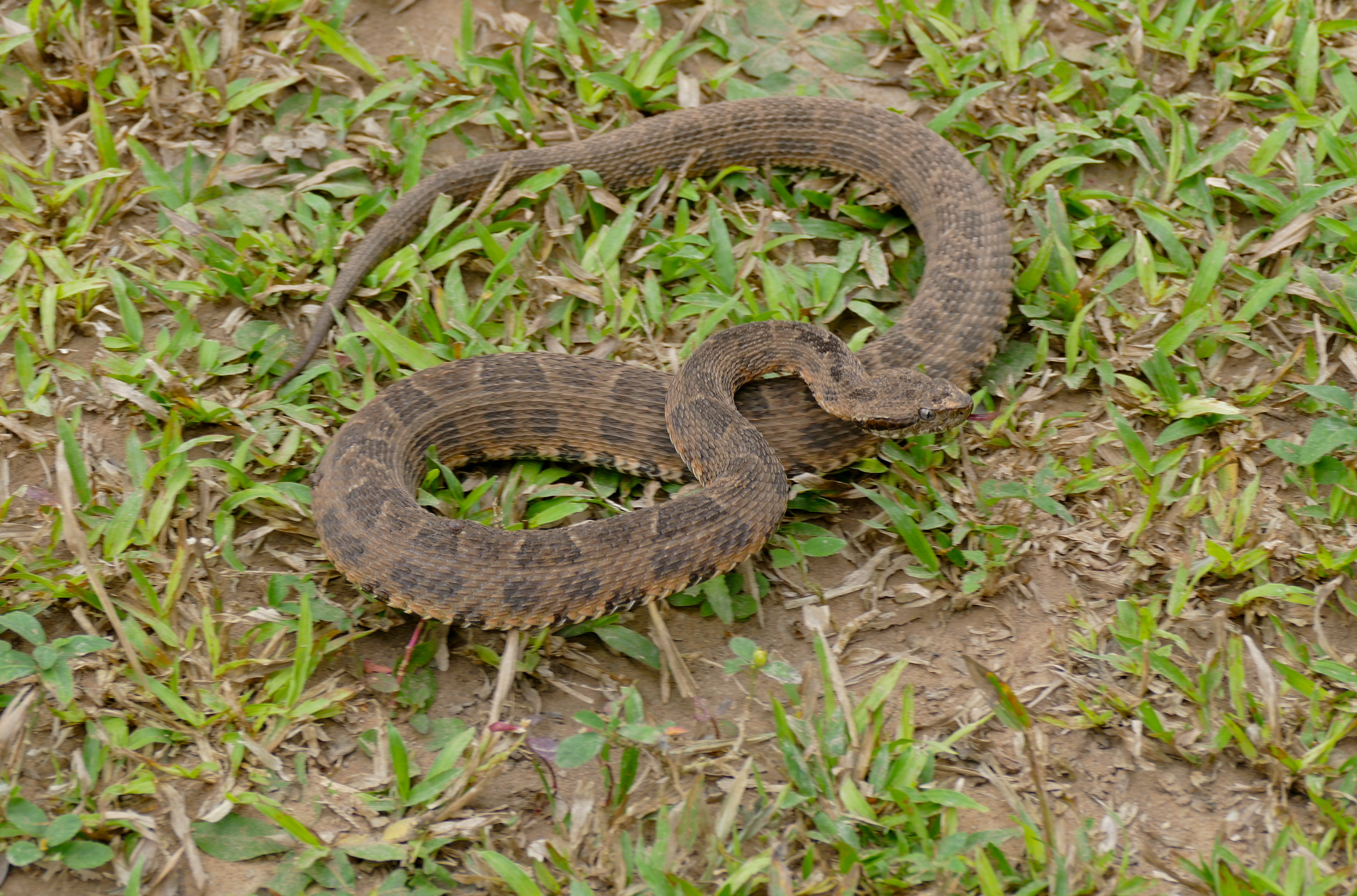
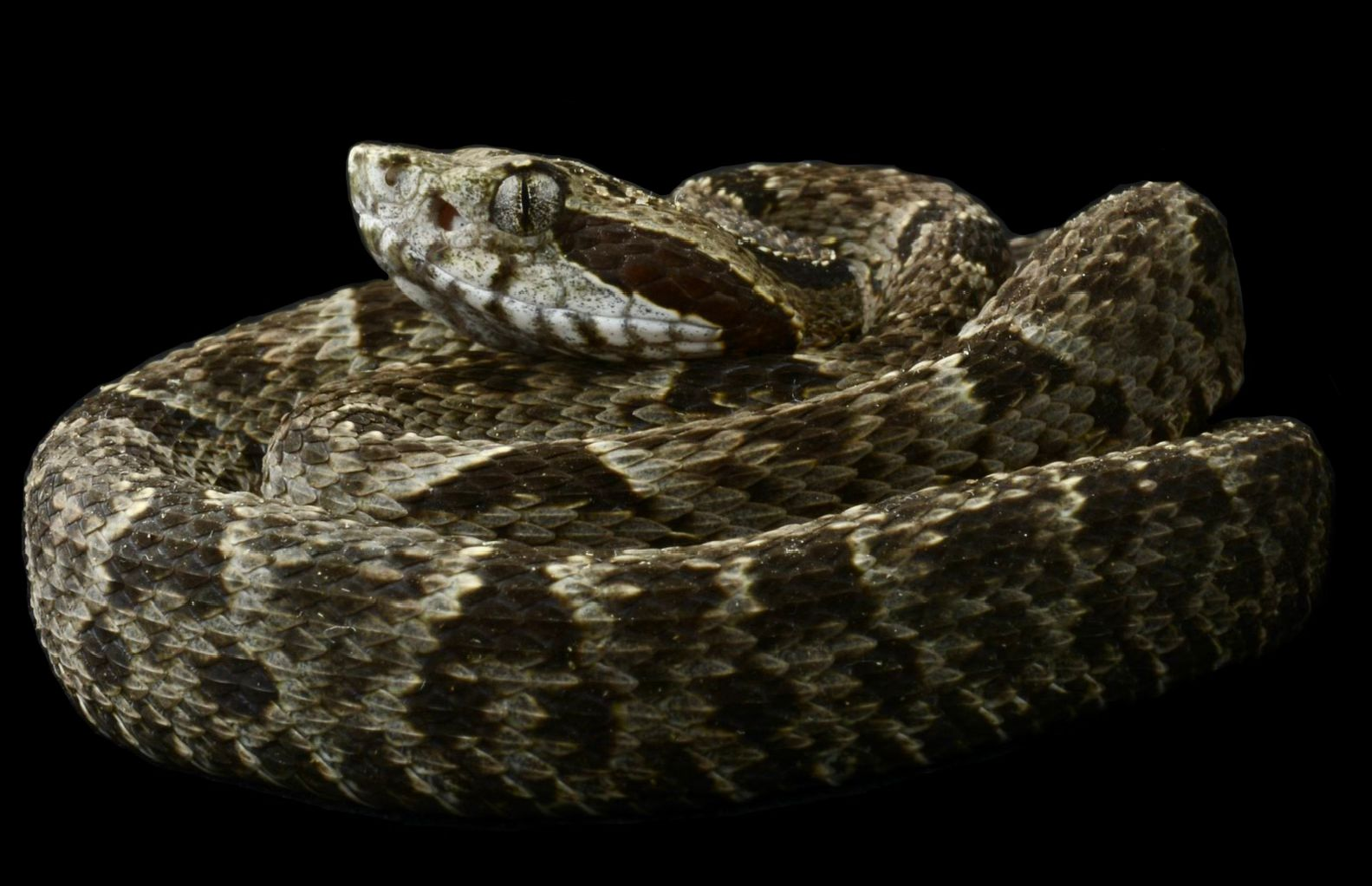
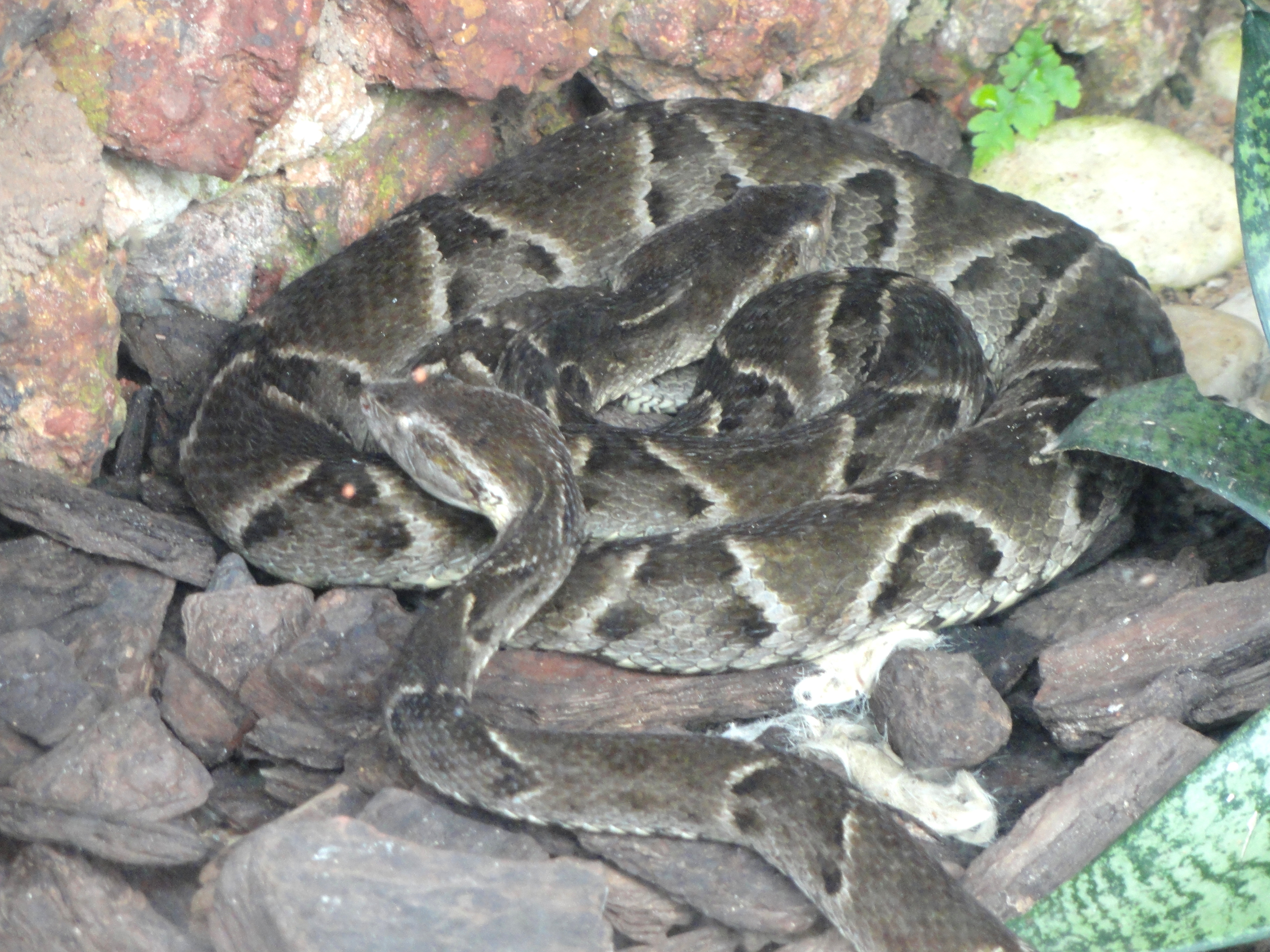
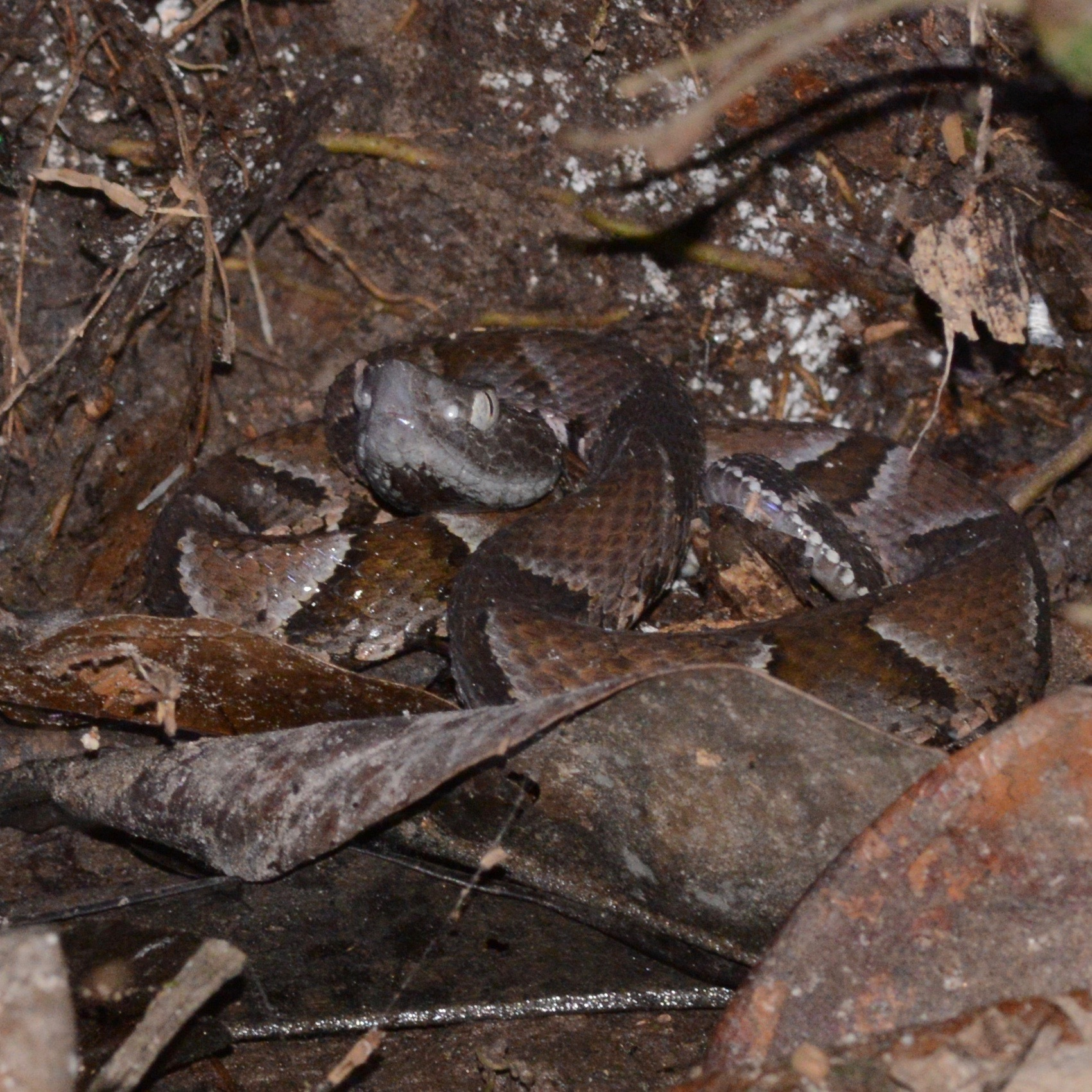
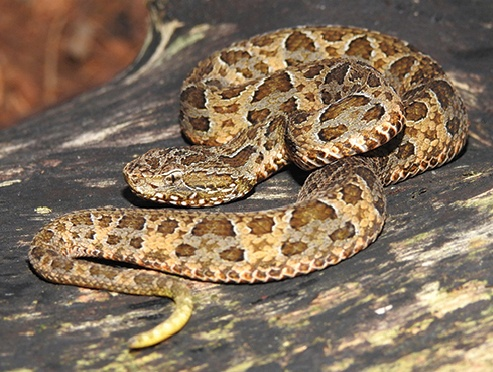
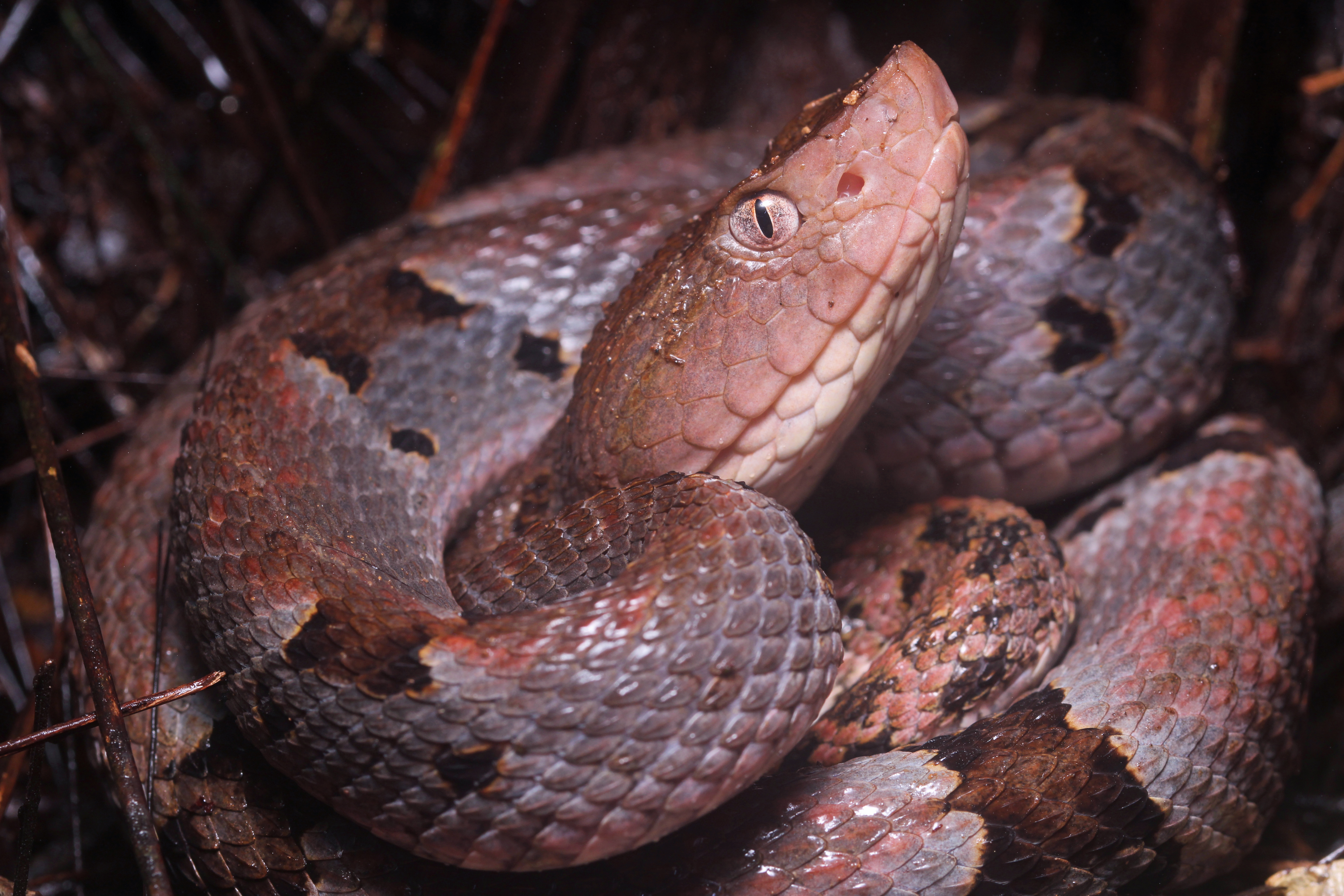
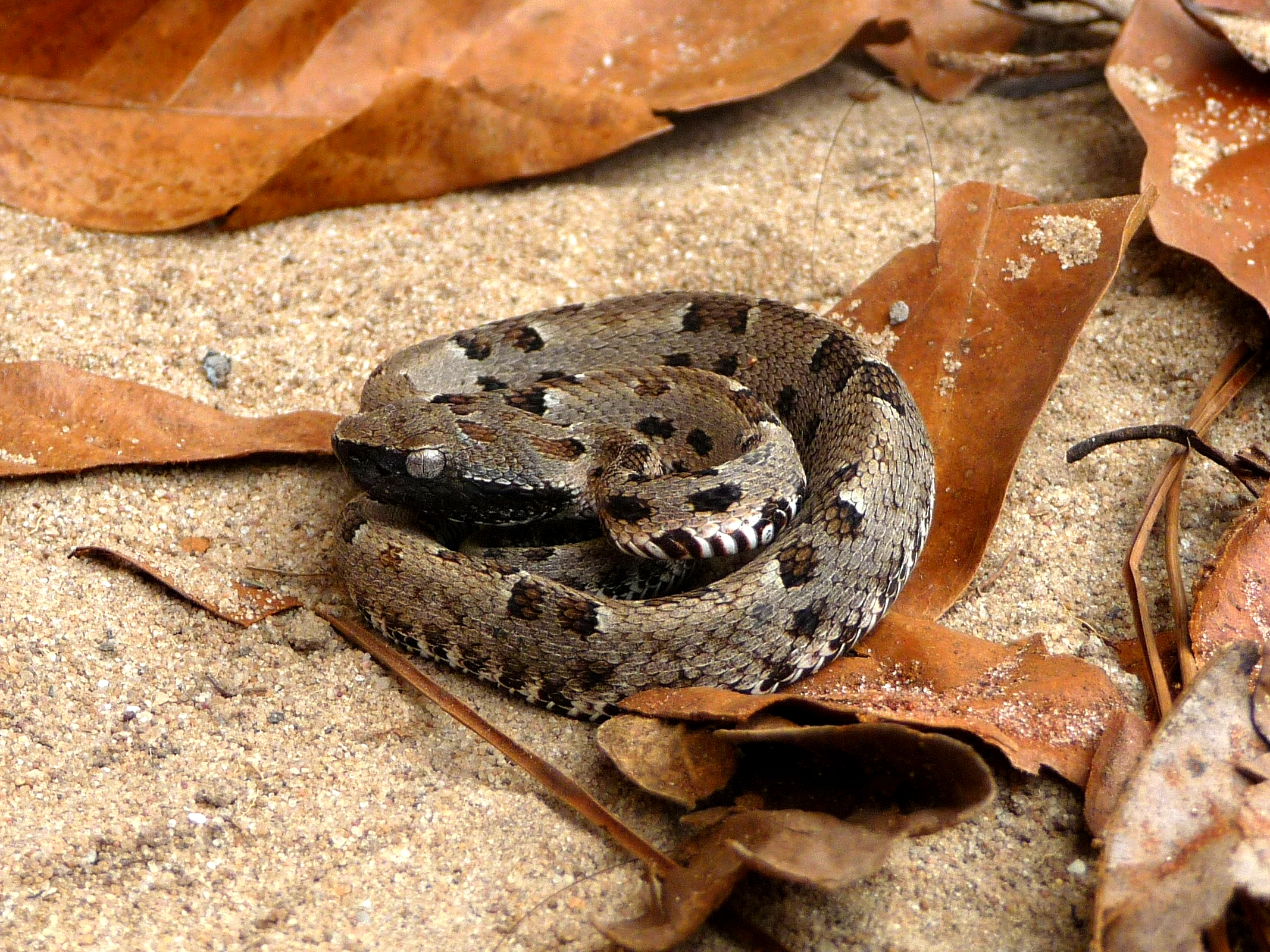
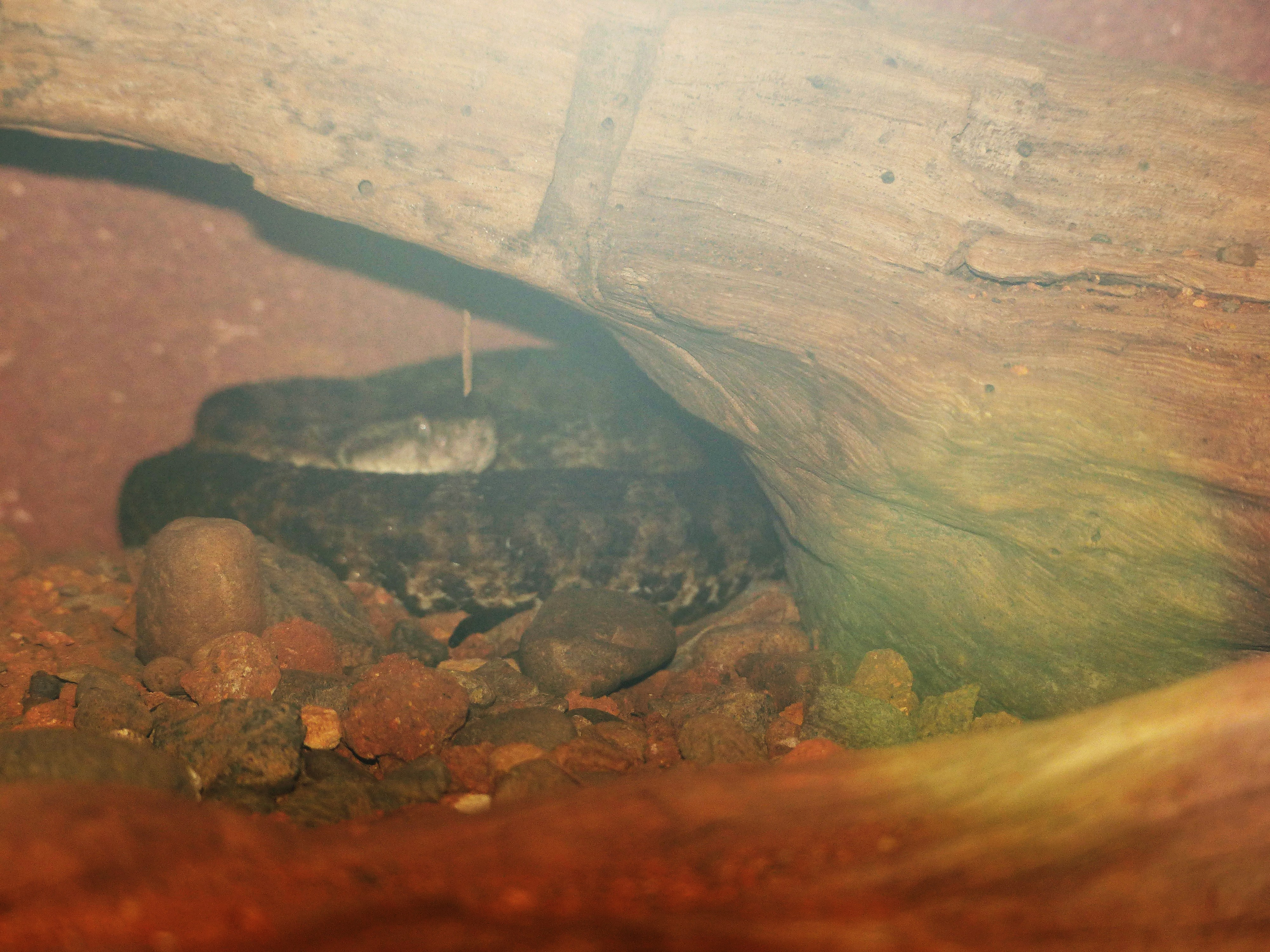
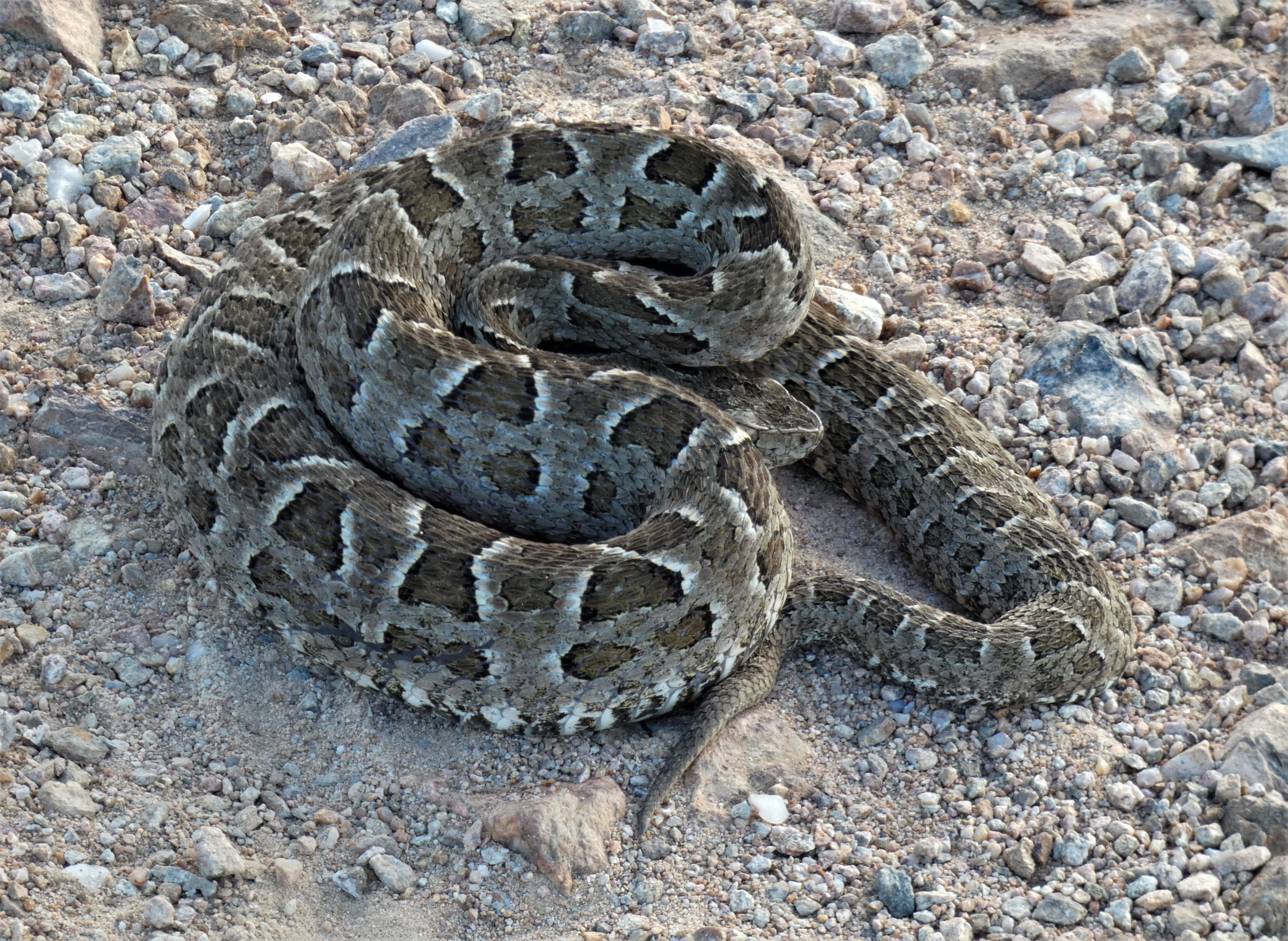
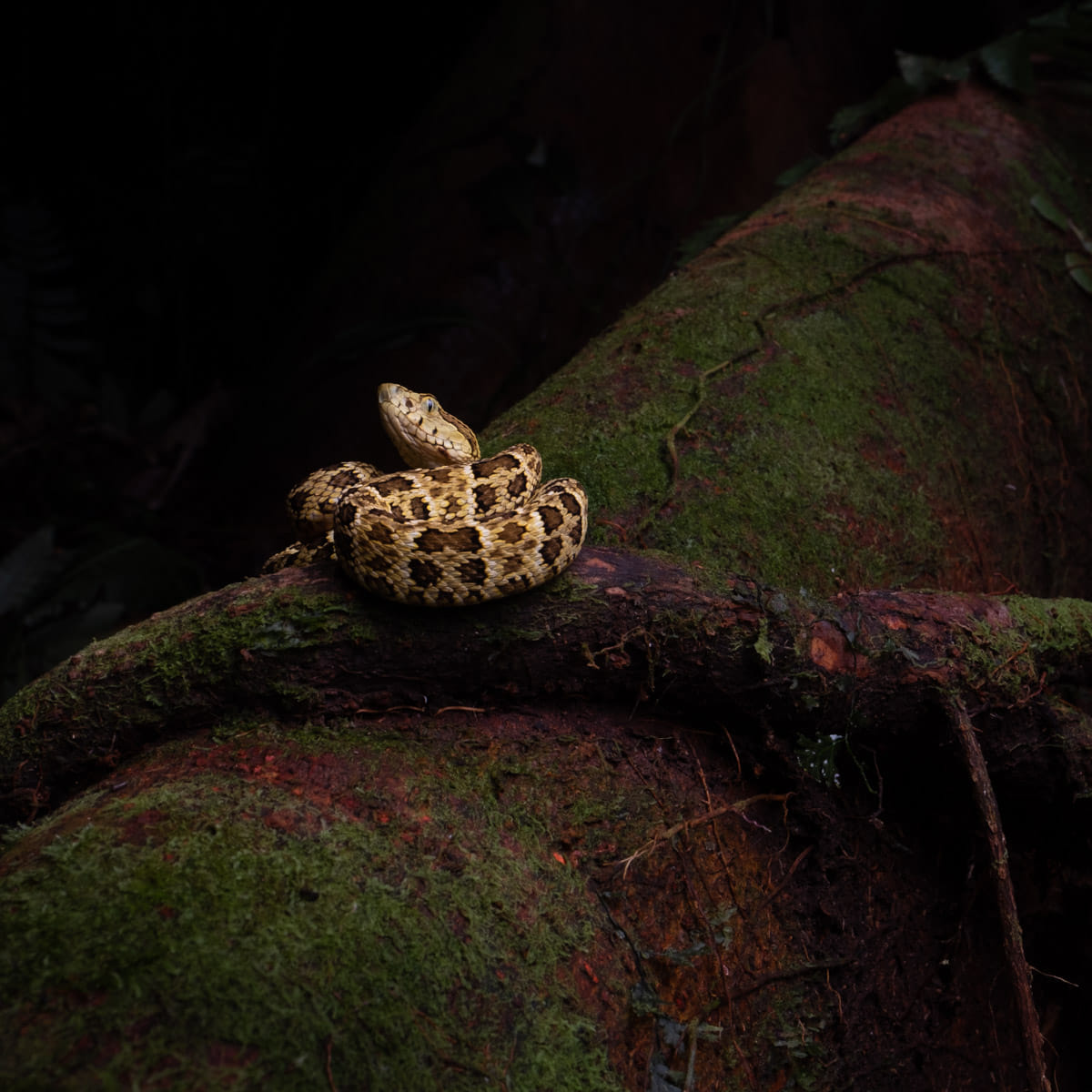
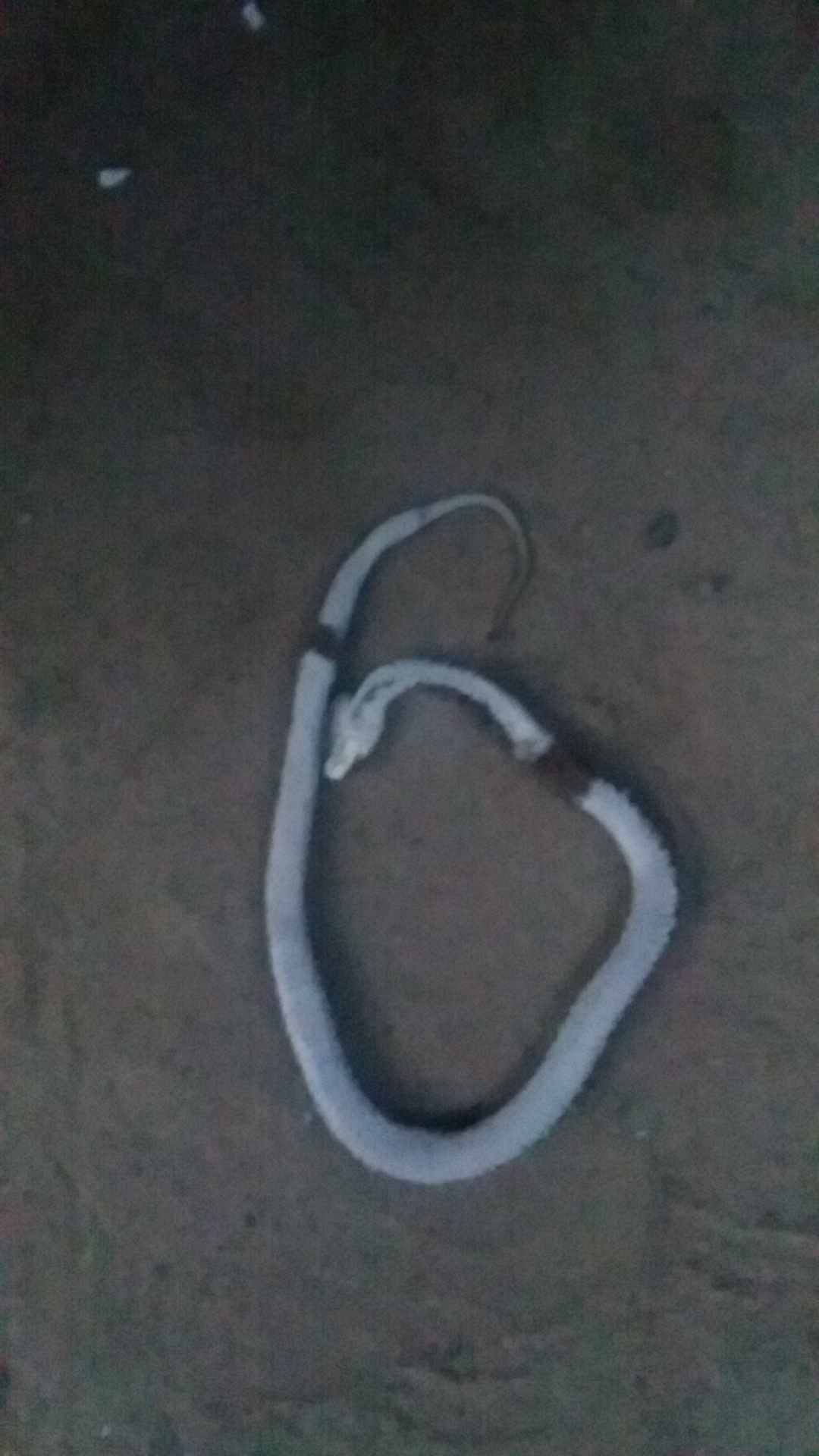
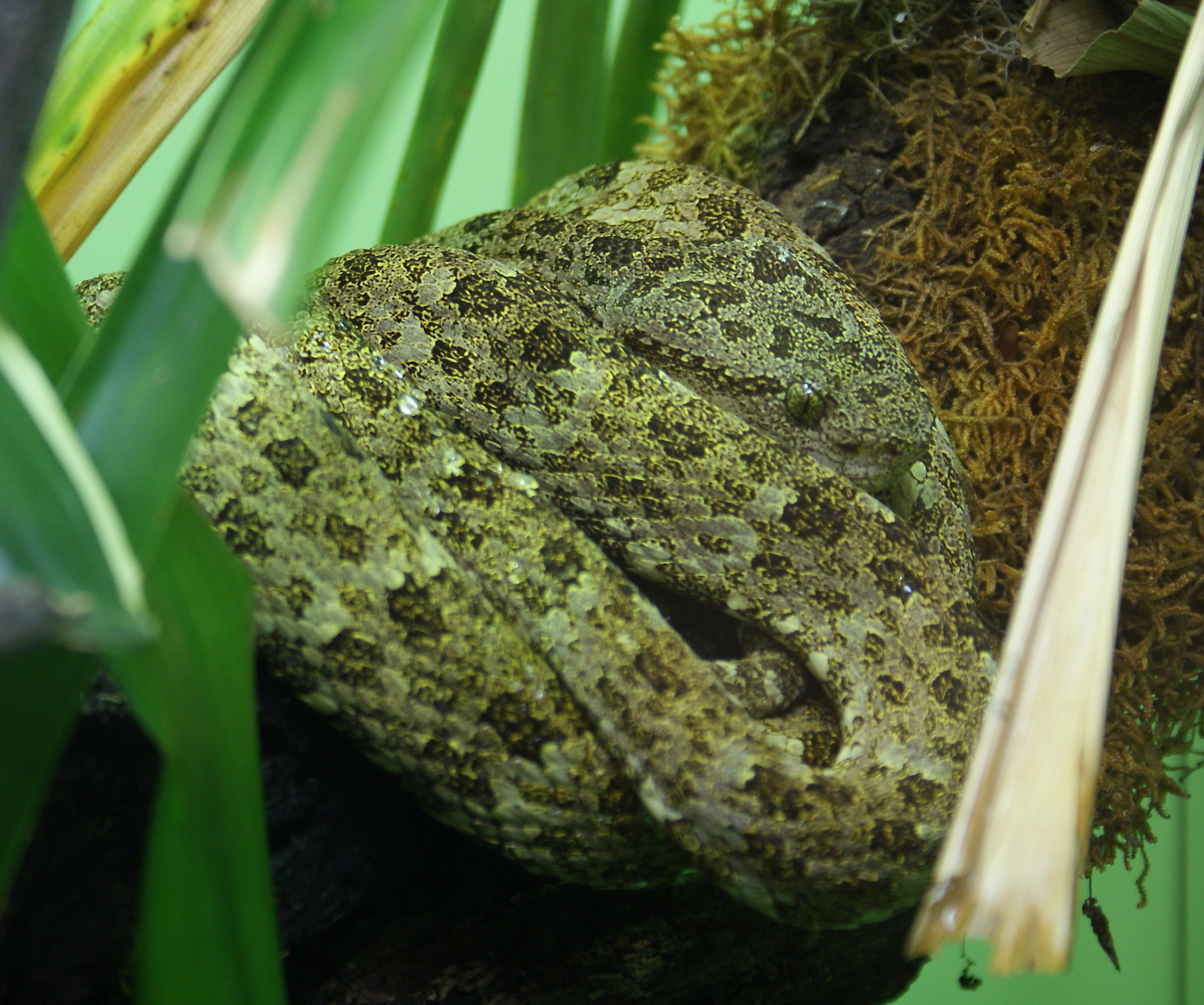
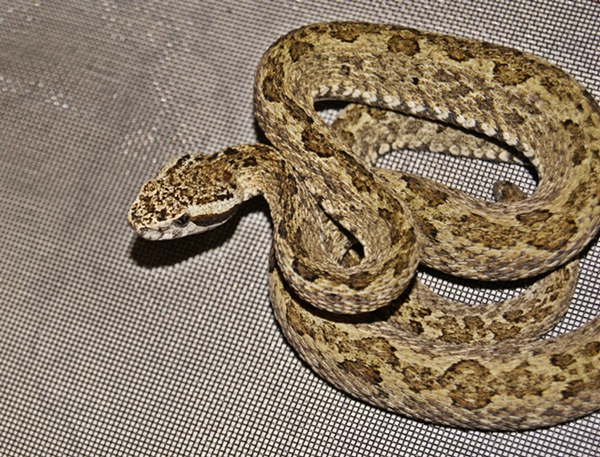
Image	Species	Subsp.*	Common name	Geographic range
	B. alcatraz Marques, Martins & Sazima, 2002	0	Alcatrazes lancehead	Alcatrazes Island, São Paulo state, Southeastern Brazil.
	B. alternatus A.M.C. Duméril, Bibron & A.H.A. Duméril, 1854	0	Urutu, yarará, víbora de la cruz	Southeastern Brazil, Paraguay, Uruguay and northern Argentina (in the provinces of Buenos Aires, Catamarca, Córdoba, Corrientes, Chaco, Entre Ríos, Formosa, La Pampa, Misiones, San Luis, Santa Fe, Santiago del Estero and Tucumán.
	B. ammodytoides Leybold, 1873	0	Patagonian lancehead	Argentina in the provinces of Buenos Aires, Catamarca, Córdoba, Chubut, La Pampa, La Rioja, Mendoza, Neuquén, Río Negro, San Juan, San Luis, Santa Cruz and Tucumán
	B. asper (Garman, 1884)	0	terciopelo (preferred), Fer-de-lance (commonly used, but incorrect)	Atlantic lowlands of eastern Mexico and Central America, including Guatemala, Belize, Honduras, Nicaragua, Costa Rica and Panama, a disjunct population occurs in southeastern Chiapas (Mexico) and southwestern Guatemala, northern South America in Colombia and Ecuador West of the Andes, westernmost Venezuela, and Tumbes, Peru.
	B. atrox (Linnaeus, 1758)	0	Common lancehead	Tropical lowlands of South America east of the Andes, including southeastern Colombia, southern and eastern Venezuela, Trinidad, Guyana, Suriname, French Guiana, eastern Ecuador, eastern Peru, northern Bolivia and the northern half of Brazil
	B. ayerbei Folleco-Fernández, 2010	0	Patian lancehead, Ayerbe's lancehead	Cauca, Colombia
	B. barnetti Parker, 1938	0	Barnett's lancehead	Along the Pacific coast of northern Peru at low elevations in arid, tropical scrub
	B. bilineatus (Wied-Neuwied, 1825)	1	Two-striped forest-pitviper	Amazon region of South America: Colombia, Venezuela, Guyana, Suriname, French Guiana, Brazil, Ecuador, Peru and Bolivia. An isolated population is known from the Atlantic versant of southeastern Brazil.
	B. brazili Hoge, 1954	0	Brazil's lancehead	Equatorial forests of eastern Peru, eastern Ecuador, Brazil and northern Bolivia
	B. caribbaeus (Garman, 1887)	0	Saint Lucia lancehead	St. Lucia, Lesser Antilles, apparently restricted to the low elevation periphery of all but the southern third and extreme northern tip of the island
	B. chloromelas (Boulenger, 1912)	0	Inca forest-pitviper	central Andes of Peru
	B. cotiara (Gomes, 1913)	0	Cotiara	Araucaria forests of southern Brazil in the states of São Paulo, Paraná, Santa Catarina and Rio Grande do Sul, northeastern Argentina in Misiones Province
	B. diporus Cope, 1862	0	Painted Lancehead	Argentina, Brazil, Paraguay, Bolivia
	B. erythromelas Amaral, 1923	0	Caatinga lancehead	Northeastern Brazil in the states of Alagoas, Bahia, Ceará, extreme eastern Maranhão, Minas Gerais, Paraíba, Pernambuco, Piauí, Rio Grande do Norte and Sergipe
	B. fonsecai Hoge & Belluomini, 1959	0	Fonseca's lancehead	Southeastern Brazil in the states of northeastern São Paulo, southern Rio de Jeneiro and extreme southern Minas Gerais
	B. germanoi Barbo, Booker, Duarte, Chaluppe, Portes, Franco & Grazziotin, 2022	0	Moela's lancehead	Ilha da Moela, Brazil
	B. insularis (Amaral, 1922)	0	Golden lancehead	Queimada Grande Island, São Paulo State, Brazil
	B. itapetiningae (Boulenger, 1907)	0	São Paulo lancehead	Southeastern Brazil in the states of Minas Gerais, Mato Grosso, São Paulo, and on the Paraná Plateau
	B. jabrensis Barbo, Grazziotin, Pereira-Filho, Freitas, Abrantes & Kokubum, 2022	0	Jabre's lancehead	Paraíba, Brazil
	B. jararaca (Wied-Neuwied, 1824)	0	Jararaca	Southern Brazil, northeastern Paraguay and northern Argentina (Misiones)
	B. jararacussu Lacerda, 1884	0	Jararacussu	Eastern Brazil (from Bahia to Santa Catarina), Paraguay, southeastern Bolivia and northeastern Argentina (Misiones Province)
	B. jonathani (Harvey, 1994)	0	Jonathan's lancehead, Cochabamba lancehead	The Altiplano of central Bolivia in the departments of Cochabamba, Santa Cruz and Tarija, and in northwestern Argentina in the departments of Jujuy and Salta, occurring at elevations of 2000–3500 m in dry, rocky grassland
	B. lanceolatus^{T} (Bonnaterre, 1790)	0	Fer-de-lance, Martinique lancehead	Martinique, Lesser Antilles
	B. leucurus Wagler, 1824	0	Whitetail lancehead, Bahia lancehead	Eastern Brazil along the Atlantic coast from northern Espírito Santo north to Alagoas and Ceará, occurs more inland in several parts of Bahia, uncertain identity of disjunct populations west of the Rio São Francisco
	B. lutzi (Miranda-Ribeiro, 1915)	0	Cerrado lancehead	Northeastern Brazil in northern Piaui state
	B. marajoensis Hoge, 1966	0	Marajó lancehead	Northern Brazil in the coastal lowlands of the Amazon Delta
	B. marmoratus Silva & Rodrigues, 2008	0	Marbled lancehead	Goiás, Brazil
	B. mattogrossensis Amaral, 1925	0	Mato Grosso lancehead	Brazil, Bolivia, Argentina, Peru
	B. medusa (Sternfeld, 1920)	0	Venezuelan forest-pitviper	Venezuela, including the Cordillera de la Costa (coastal range), the Federal District and the states of Aragua, Bolívar and Carabobo.
	B. monsignifer Timms, Chaparro, Venegas, Salazar-Valenzuela, Scrocchi, Cuevas, Leynaud & Carrasco, 2019	0		Eastern slopes of the Andes of Bolivia and southern Peru
	B. moojeni Hoge, 1966	0	Brazilian lancehead	Central and southeastern Brazil, eastern Paraguay, northeastern Argentina (Misiones) and likely eastern Bolivia
	B. muriciensis Ferrarezzi & Freire, 2001	0		Mata de Murici, Alagoas state, Northeastern Brazil
	B. neuwiedi Wagler, 1824	6	Neuwied's lancehead	South America east of the Andes and south of 5°S, including Brazil (southern Maranhão, Piauí, Ceará, Bahia, Goiás, Mato Grosso, an isolated population in Amazonas, Rondônia and all southern states), Bolivia, Paraguay, Argentina (Catamarca, Córdoba, Corrientes, Chaco, Entre Ríos, Formosa, Jujuy, La Pampa, La Rioja, Mendoza, Misiones, Salta, San Juan, San Luis, Santa Fe, Santiago del Estero and Tucumán) and Uruguay
	B. oligobalius Dal Vechio, Prates, Grazziotin, Graboski & Rodrigues, 2021	0		Amazonian forests of southern Colombia, southern Venezuela, Guyana, Suriname, French Guiana and Brazil north of the Amazon/Solimões
	B. oligolepis (F. Werner, 1901)	0	Peruvian forest-pitviper	Eastern slopes of the Andes in Peru and Bolivia.
	B. osbornei Freire-Lascano, 1991	0		Western Ecuador, Northwestern Peru
	B. otavioi Barbo, Grazziotin, Sazima, Martins & Sawaya, 2012	0		Vitória Island, São Paulo, Brazil
	B. pauloensis Amaral, 1925	0		Brazil, Paraguay, Bolivia
	B. pictus (Tschudi, 1845)	0	Desert lancehead	Peru on the hills of the Pacific coastal region and versant up to about 1800 m elevation
	B. pirajai Amaral, 1923	0	Piraja's lancehead	Brazil in central and southern Bahia state and possibly also Minas Gerais
	B. pubescens (Cope, 1870)	0		Brazil, Uruguay
	B. pulcher (W. Peters, 1862)	0	Andean forest-pitviper	Eastern slopes of the Andes from south-central Colombia to southern Ecuador.
	B. punctatus (García, 1896)	0	Chocoan lancehead	From the Darién of Panama along the Pacific slope of Colombia and Ecuador.
	B. sanctaecrucis Hoge, 1966	0	Bolivian lancehead	Bolivia in the Amazonian lowlands from the departments of El Beni to Santa Cruz
	B. sazimai Barbo, Gasparini, Almeida, Zaher, Grazziotin, Gusmão, Ferrarini & Sawaya, 2016	0	Franceses Island lancehead	Ilha dos Franceses, Espírito Santo, Brazil
	B. sonene Carrasco, Grazziotin, Santa Cruz-Farfán, Koch, Ochoa, Scrocchi, Leynaud & Chaparro, 2019	0		Madre de Dios, Peru
	B. taeniatus (Wagler, 1824)	1	Speckled forest-pitviper	Widespread in the equatorial forests of Ecuador, Colombia, Venezuela, Guyana, Suriname, French Guiana, Brazil, Peru and Bolivia.
	B. venezuelensis Sandner-Montilla, 1952	0	Venezuelan lancehead	Northern and central Venezuela, including the Cordillera de la Costa (coast range) and the states of Aragua, Carabobo, the Federal District, Miranda, Mérida, Trujillo, Lara, Falcón, Yaracuy and Sucre, and Colombia (Norte de Santander and Boyacá departments

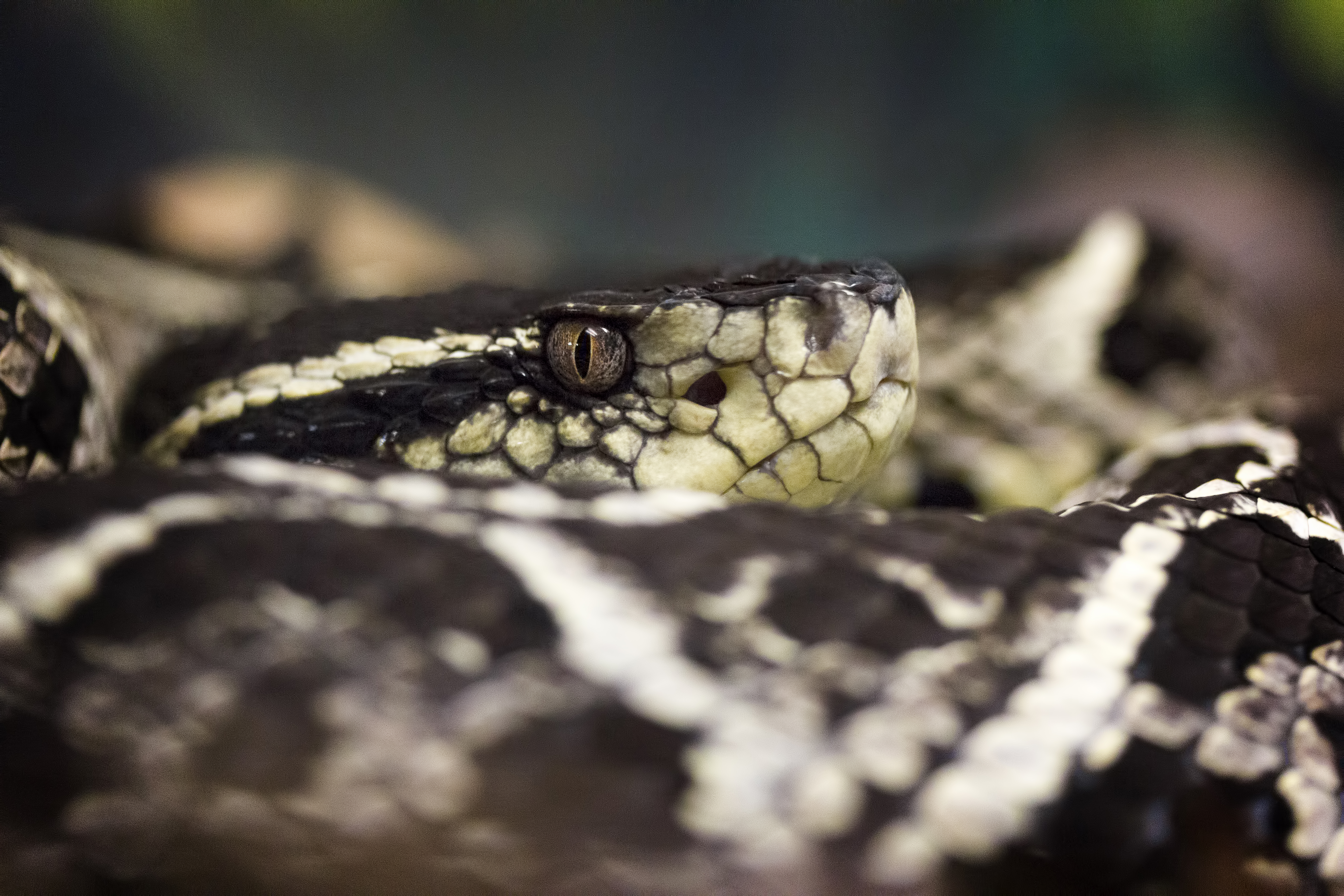
Bothrops jararaca

* Not including the nominate subspecies.
^{T} Type species
