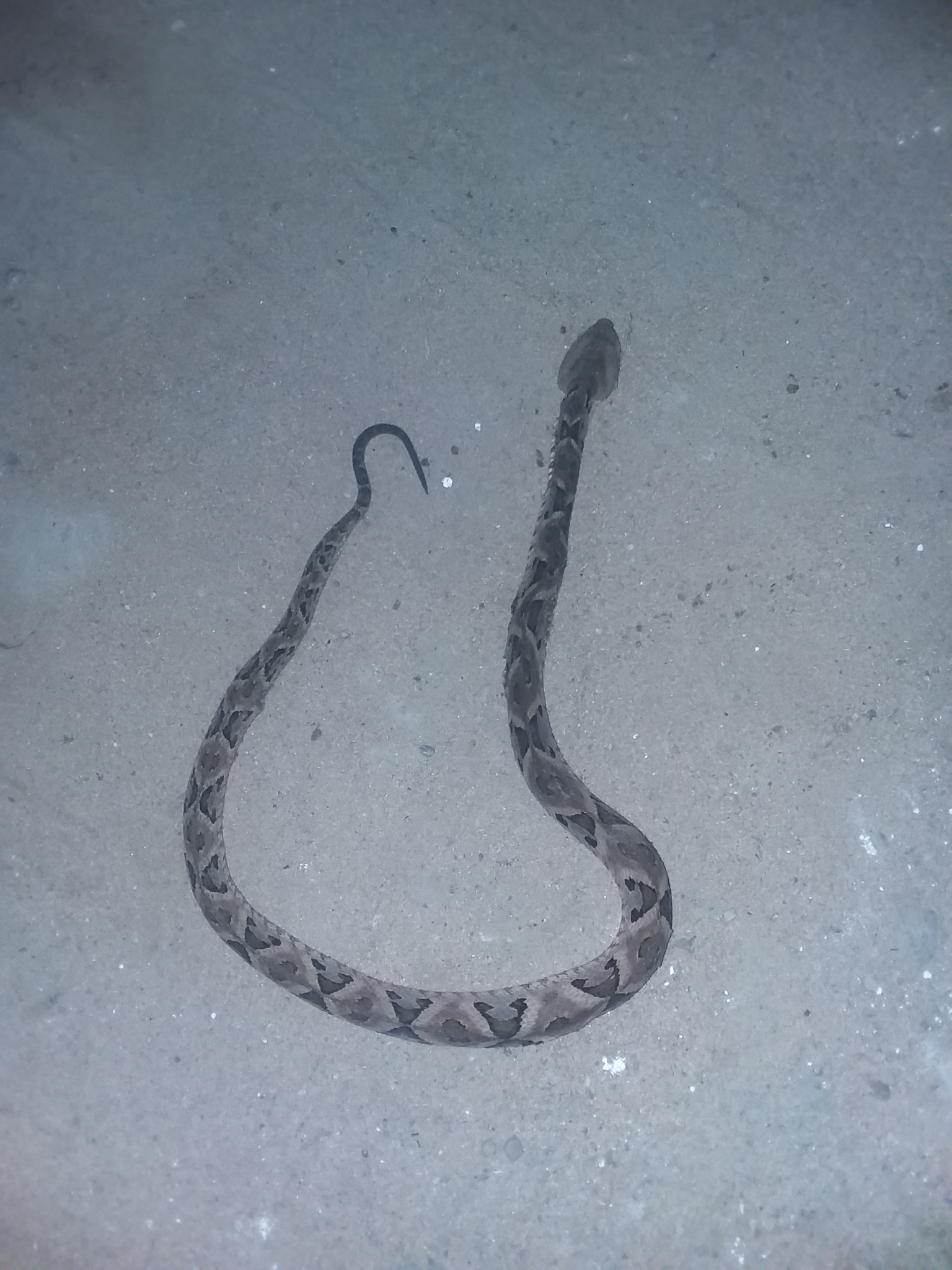

Scientific classification
- Kingdom: Animalia
- Phylum: Chordata
- Class: Reptilia
- Order: Squamata
- Suborder: Serpentes
- Family: Viperidae
- Genus: Bothrops
- Species: B. sanctaecrucis

Binomial name
- Bothrops sanctaecrucis Hoge, 1966

= Bothrops sanctaecrucis =

Bolivian lancehead

Species of snake

Bothrops sanctaecrucis, or the Bolivian lancehead, is a species of venomous snake in the family Viperidae. It is endemic to South America.

== Geographic range ==
It is found in Bolivia in the departments of Beni and Santa Cruz.

The type locality is Río Sécure, Oromono, Bolivia.
