= Bothrops osbornei =

Conservation status
- Vulnerable (IUCN 3.1)

Scientific classification
- Kingdom: Animalia
- Phylum: Chordata
- Class: Reptilia
- Order: Squamata
- Suborder: Serpentes
- Family: Viperidae
- Genus: Bothrops
- Species: B. osbornei

Binomial name
- Bothrops osbornei Freire-Lascano, 1991

Species of snake

Bothrops osbornei is a species of venomous snake in the subfamily Crotalinae of the family Viperidae. The species is native to Ecuador and northwestern Peru.

== Etymology ==
The specific name, osbornei, is in honor of American herpetologist Steven T. Osborne.

== Habitat ==
The requisite natural habitat of Bothrops osbornei is moist or wet forest, at elevations of 500–2,000 m (1,600–6,600 ft).

== Behavior ==
Bothrops osbornei is semiarboreal.

== Reproduction ==
Bothrops osbornei is viviparous.
