= Bothrops ayerbei =

Scientific classification
- Kingdom: Animalia
- Phylum: Chordata
- Class: Reptilia
- Order: Squamata
- Suborder: Serpentes
- Family: Viperidae
- Genus: Bothrops
- Species: B. ayerbei

Binomial name
- Bothrops ayerbei Folleco-Fernandez, 2010

Species of snake

Bothrops ayerbei, commonly known as Ayerbe's lancehead, the Patian lancehead, and equis patiana in Spanish, is a species of venomous snake, a pit viper in the subfamily Colubrinae of the family Viperidae. The species is endemic to Colombia. The species is named after Santiago Ayerbe González, physician, pediatrician, herpetologist and toxinologist, who thought of the species as distinct years before its description. The scientific name is contentious, as the description was produced online before 2011, and is therefore against the Code of Zoological Nomenclature.

== Description ==
Bothrops ayerbei is a medium-sized snake, with a total length (tail included) around 110 cm (43 in) for males, and around 130 cm (51 in) for females. However, individuals have been sighted at 210 cm (83 in). The head is long and narrow, resembling the shape of an arrowhead.

Its colour and pattern consists of 14–19 black triangles (lined up in near-symmetrical pairs) with light grey/cream edges and two dark rounded spots at the bottom of the triangles as well as two more spots between pairs of triangles. The underside of the mouth is also usually cream-coloured, with a cream and black mottle on the snake's underside.

== Habitat ==
The Patian lancehead is distributed within the upper Patía river valley Departments of Cauca and Nariño, southwestern Colombia. Generally it will be at an elevation of 400 to 1,800 m (1,300 to 5,900 ft).

== Sexual dimorphism ==
Bothrops ayerbei exhibits sexual dimorphism mainly in the number of scales the different sexes have. Males tend to have fewer ventral scales than females, but males can sometimes have just barely more subaudal scales than females.

It exhibits sexual dimorphism in colours as well, specifically as neonates, with males displaying yellow on the tail. This colouration remains for at least two years.

== Reproduction ==
The species Bothrops ayerbei reproduces sexually and is viviparous.
