= Bothrops marajoensis =

Marajó lancehead

Scientific classification
- Kingdom: Animalia
- Phylum: Chordata
- Class: Reptilia
- Order: Squamata
- Suborder: Serpentes
- Family: Viperidae
- Genus: Bothrops
- Species: B. marajoensis

Binomial name
- Bothrops marajoensis Hoge, 1966

Species of snake

Bothrops marajoensis, or the Marajó lancehead, is a species of venomous snake in the family Viperidae. It is endemic to Brazil.

== Geographic range ==
It is found in Brazil in the state of Pará.

The type locality is Severino, Marajó Island, Pará, Brazil.
