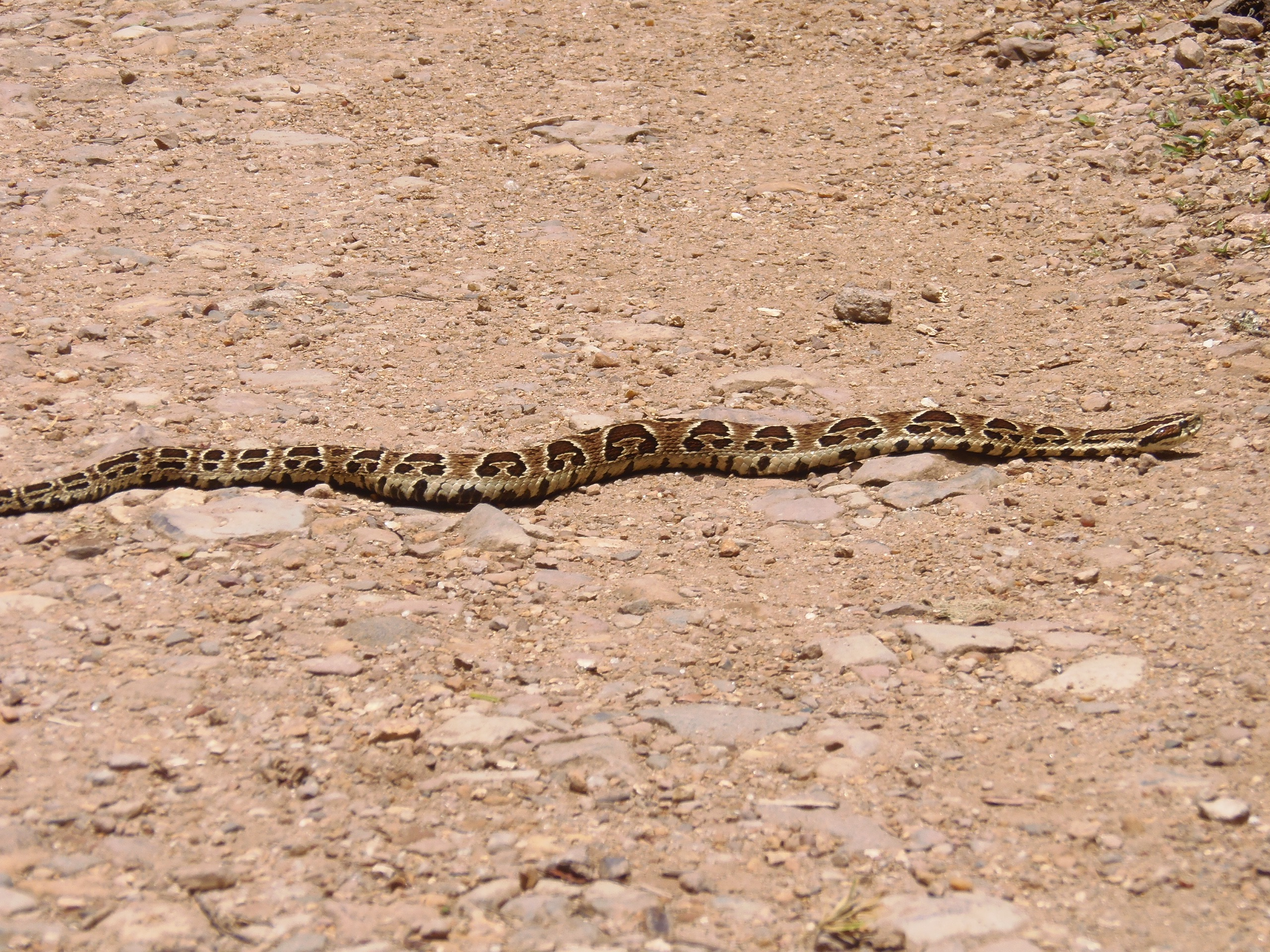

Conservation status
- Least Concern (IUCN 3.1)

Scientific classification
- Kingdom: Animalia
- Phylum: Chordata
- Class: Reptilia
- Order: Squamata
- Suborder: Serpentes
- Family: Viperidae
- Genus: Bothrops
- Species: B. cotiara

Binomial name
- Bothrops cotiara (Gomes, 1913)

Synonyms
- Lachesis cotiara Gomes, 1913; Bothrops cotiara – Amaral, 1925; Rhinocerophis cotiara – Fenwick et al., 2009

= Bothrops cotiara =

Species of snake

Bothrops cotiara is a species of venomous snake in the family Viperidae. It is endemic to Brazil and Argentina.

== Etymology ==
The specific name, cotiara, is taken from one of its common names.

== Common names ==
Boicoatiara, boicotiara, boiquatiara, coatiara, jararaca-de-barriga-preta, jararaca-preta, and quatiara.

== Geographic range ==
It is found in Argentina in Misiones Province; and in Brazil in the states of Paraná, Rio Grande do Sul, Santa Catarina, and São Paulo.

The type locality is "Núcleo Colonial Cruz Machado, [município de] Marechal Mallet, Estado do Paraná, Brasil".
