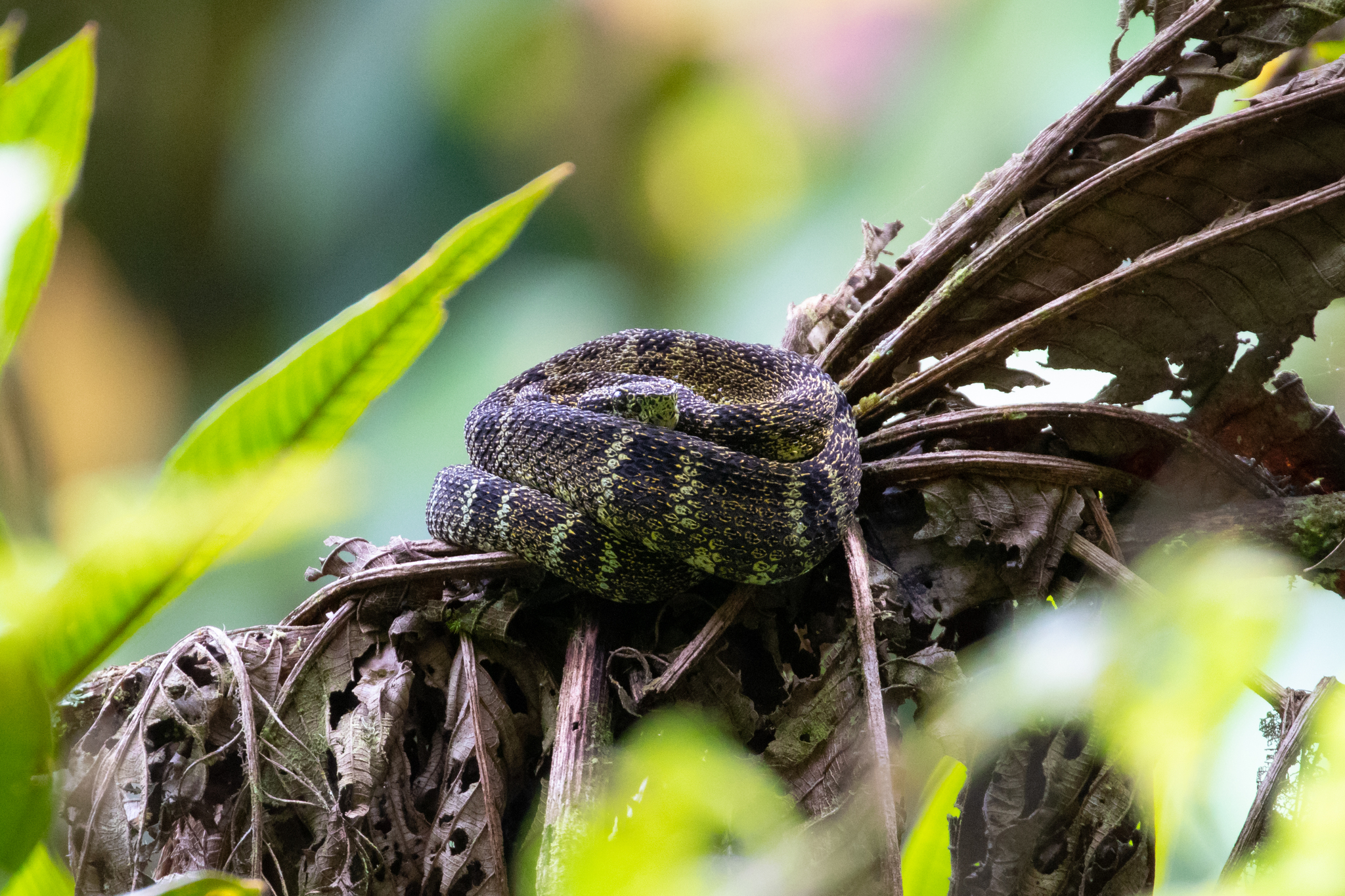

Conservation status
- Least Concern (IUCN 3.1)

Scientific classification
- Kingdom: Animalia
- Phylum: Chordata
- Class: Reptilia
- Order: Squamata
- Suborder: Serpentes
- Family: Viperidae
- Genus: Bothrops
- Species: B. chloromelas

Binomial name
- Bothrops chloromelas Hoge, 1949

Synonyms
- Bothriopsis chloromelas (Boulenger, 1912); Lachesis chloromelas Boulenger, 1912

= Bothrops chloromelas =

Species of snake

Bothrops chloromelas, the coastal lancehead or Inca forest pit viper, is a venomous species of pit viper found in South America.

== Taxonomy and etymology ==
The species was first described in 1949 by Brazilian herpetologist Alphonse Richard Hoge.

== Habitat ==
The species is native to montane forest at altitudes of 1,000-2,000 meters above sea level. It appears to prefer primary to secondary forest.
