= Bothrops germanoi =

Scientific classification
- Kingdom: Animalia
- Phylum: Chordata
- Class: Reptilia
- Order: Squamata
- Suborder: Serpentes
- Family: Viperidae
- Genus: Bothrops
- Species: B. germanoi

Binomial name
- Bothrops germanoi Barbo et al., 2022

Species of snake

Bothrops germanoi, also known as Moela's lancehead or jararaca-damoela, is a species of pit viper from São Paulo, Brazil. It is named after Mr Valdir J. Germano, who is regarded as one of the most renowned Brazilian experts in snake identification.

== Description ==
Bothrops germanoi is distinguished from other Bothrops species by many characteristics, such as specific scale counts, a small cream-coloured spot above the head, a white or cream stripe around their eyes, brown blotches along the body and pale tail.

Characteristics that distinguish them from B. jararaca specifically are a smaller snout-to-vent length, larger head, less ventral scales and a longer tail in males. B. germanoi is also distinguishable from B. alcatraz, B. insularis and B. otavioi in several ways, most notably the smaller head, more ventrals and more subcaudal scales in males.

== Sexual dimorphism ==
Bothrops germanoi exhibits sexual dimorphism in many subtle ways, one example being scale count. Females are likely to have slightly more ventral and subinfralabial scales than males, and males generally have more subcaudals than females.

== Diet ==
Bothrops germanoi is known to eat mainly nocturnal prey such as centipedes, frogs and lizards.
