= List of crotaline species and subspecies =

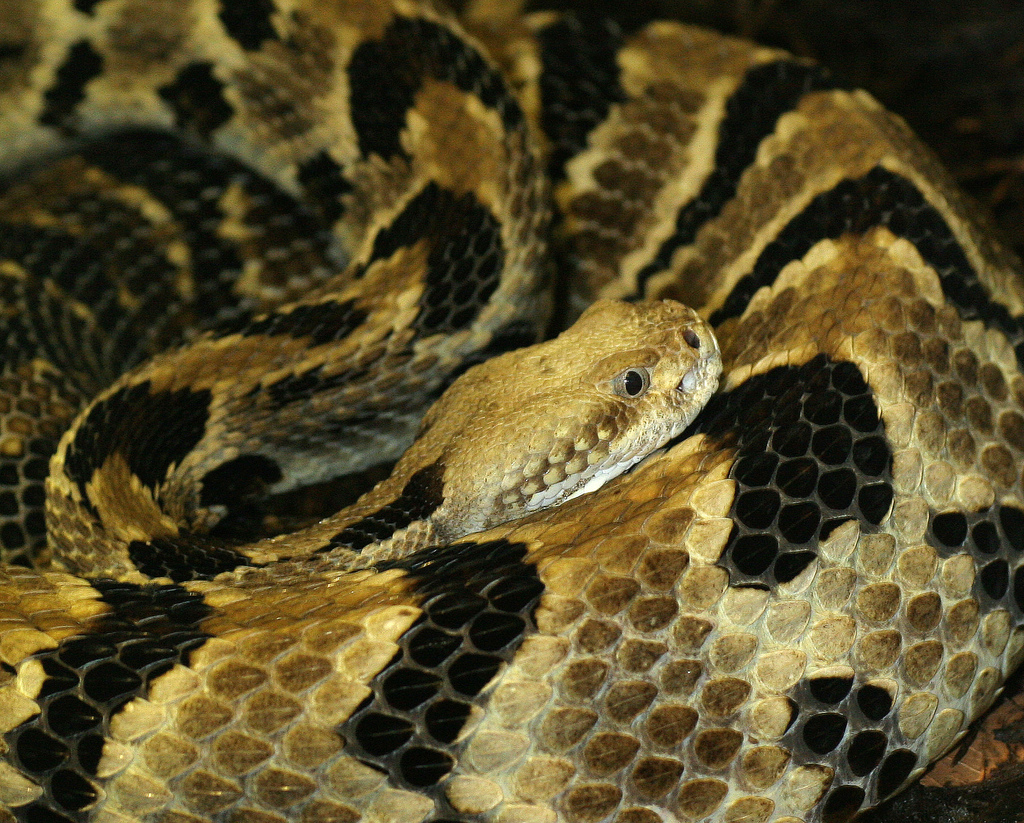
Timber rattlesnake, Crotalus horridus

This is a list of all sure genera, species and subspecies of the subfamily Crotalinae, otherwise referred to as crotalines, pit vipers, or pitvipers, and including rattlesnakes Crotalus and Sistrurus. This list follows the taxonomy as of 2007 provided by ITIS, which was based on the continuing work of Dr. Roy McDiarmid. with the addition of more recently described species.

== Species list ==
- Agkistrodon, American ground pit vipers
  - Agkistrodon bilineatus, Mexican ground pit viper
  - Agkistrodon contortrix, Copperhead
    - Agkistrodon contortrix contortrix, Eastern copperhead
    - Agkistrodon contortrix laticinctus, Broad-banded copperhead
    - Agkistrodon contortrix mokasen, Northern copperhead
    - Agkistrodon contortrix phaeogaster, Osage copperhead
    - Agkistrodon contortrix pictigaster, Trans-Pecos copperhead
  - Agkistrodon howardgloydi, Castellana
  - Agkistrodon piscivorus, Cottonmouth also known as the Water Moccasin
    - Agkistrodon piscivorus conanti, Florida cottonmouth
    - Agkistrodon piscivorus leucostoma, Western cottonmouth
    - Agkistrodon piscivorus piscivorus, Eastern cottonmouth
  - Agkistrodon russeolus, Yucatecan ground pit viper
  - Agkistrodon taylori, Taylor's ground pit viper
- Atropoides, Jumping pit vipers
  - Atropoides picadoi, Picado's jumping pit viper
- Bothriechis, American palm pit vipers
  - Bothriechis aurifer, Yellow-blotched palm pit viper
  - Bothriechis bicolor, Guatemalan palm pit viper
  - Bothriechis guifarroi, Guifarro's palm pit viper
  - Bothriechis lateralis, Side-striped palm pit viper
  - Bothriechis marchi, Honduran palm pit viper
  - Bothriechis nigroviridis, Black-speckled palm pit viper
  - Bothriechis nubestris, Talamancan palm pit viper
  - Bothriechis rowleyi, Mexican palm pit viper
  - Bothriechis schlegelii, Eyelash viper
  - Bothriechis supraciliaris, Blotched palm pit viper
  - Bothriechis thalassinus, Merendon palm pit viper
- Bothrocophias
  - Bothrocophias andianus, Andean lancehead
  - Bothrocophias campbelli, Ecuadorian toad-headed pit viper
  - Bothrocophias colombianus, Colombian toad-headed pit viper
  - Bothrocophias hyoprora, Amazonian toad-headed pit viper
  - Bothrocophias microphthalmus, Small-eyed toad-headed pit viper
  - Bothrocophias myersi, Chocoan toadheaded pit viper, Equis red snake
- Bothrops, American lanceheads
  - Bothrops alcatraz
  - Bothrops alternatus, Urutu
  - Bothrops ammodytoides, Patagonian lancehead
  - Bothrops asper, Terciopelo/Fer-de-lance
  - Bothrops atrox, Common lancehead
  - Bothrops barnetti, Barnett's lancehead
  - Bothrops bilineatus, Two-striped forest pit viper
    - Bothriopsis bilineatus bilineatus
    - Bothrops bilineatus smaragdinus
  - Bothrops brazili, Brazil's lancehead
  - Bothrops caribbaeus, Saint Lucia lancehead
  - Bothrops cotiara, Cotiara
  - Bothrops diporus, Chaco lancehead
  - Bothrops erythromelas, Caatinga lancehead
  - Bothrops fonsecai, Fonseca's lancehead
  - Bothrops insularis, Golden lancehead
  - Bothrops itapetiningae, São Paulo lancehead
  - Bothrops jararaca, Jararaca
  - Bothrops jararacussu, Jararacussu
  - Bothrops jonathani, Cochabamba lancehead
  - Bothrops lanceolatus, Martinique lancehead
  - Bothrops leucurus, Bahia lancehead
  - Bothrops lojanus, Lojan lancehead
  - Bothrops lutzi, Cerrado lancehead
  - Bothrops marajoensis, Marajó lancehead
  - Bothrops marmoratus
  - Bothrops mattogrossensis, Mato Grosso lancehead
  - Bothrops medusa, Venezuelan forest pit viper
  - Bothrops monsignifer
  - Bothrops moojeni, Brazilian lancehead
  - Bothrops muriciensis, Murici lancehead
  - Bothrops neuwiedi, Neuwied's lancehead
    - Bothrops neuwiedi paramanensis
  - Bothrops oligobalius
  - Bothrops oligolepis, Peruvian forest pit viper
  - Bothrops osbornei
  - Bothrops otavioi
  - Bothrops pauloensis, Black-faced lancehead
  - Bothrops pictus, Desert lancehead
  - Bothrops pirajai, Piraja's lancehead
  - Bothrops pubescens, Pampas lancehead
  - Bothrops pulcher, Andean forest pit viper
  - Bothrops punctatus, Chocoan lancehead
  - Bothrops sanctaecrucis, Bolivian lancehead
  - Bothrops sazimai, Franceses Island lancehead
  - Bothrops sonene
  - Bothrops taeniatus, Speckled forest pit viper
    - Bothrops taeniatus lichenosus
    - Bothriopsis taeniatus taeniatus
  - Bothrops venezuelensis, Venezuelan lancehead
- Calloselasma, Malayan ground pit vipers
  - Calloselasma rhodostoma, Malayan ground pit viper
- Cerrophidion, American mountain pit vipers (montane pit vipers)
  - Cerrophidion godmani, Godman's montane pit viper
  - Cerrophidion petlalcalensis, Godman's montane pit viper
  - Cerrophidion sasai, Costa Rica montane pit viper
  - Cerrophidion tzotzilorum, Tzotzil montane pit viper
  - Cerrophidion wilsoni, Honduras montane pit viper
- Crotalus, Common rattlesnakes
  - Crotalus adamanteus, Eastern diamondback rattlesnake
  - Crotalus angelensis, Angel de la Guarda Island speckled rattlesnake
  - Crotalus aquilus, Queretaran dusky rattlesnake
  - Crotalus armstrongi, Western dusky rattlesnake
  - Crotalus atrox, Western diamondback rattlesnake
  - Crotalus basiliscus, Mexican west coast rattlesnake
  - Crotalus campbelli
  - Crotalus catalinensis, Santa Catalina rattlesnake
  - Crotalus cerastes, Sidewinder
    - Crotalus cerastes cerastes, Mojave desert sidewinder
    - Crotalus cerastes cercobombus, Sonoran sidewinder
    - Crotalus cerastes laterorepens, Colorado desert sidewinder
  - Crotalus culminatus, Northwestern neotropical rattlesnake
  - Crotalus durissus, South American rattlesnake
    - Crotalus durissus cumanensis, Venezuelan rattlesnake
    - Crotalus durissus durissus, Cascabel rattlesnake
    - Crotalus durissus marajoensis, Marajoan rattlesnake
    - Crotalus durissus maricelae
    - Crotalus durissus ruruima, Mt. Roraima rattlesnake
    - Crotalus durissus terrificus, South American rattlesnake
    - Crotalus durissus trigonicus, Rupunini rattlesnake
    - Crotalus durissus unicolor, Aruba Island rattlesnake
    - Crotalus durissus vegrandis, Uracoan rattlesnake
  - Crotalus ehecatl
  - Crotalus enyo, Baja rattlesnake
    - Crotalus enyo cerralvensis, Cerralvo Island rattlesnake
    - Crotalus enyo enyo, Lower California rattlesnake
    - Crotalus enyo furvus, Rosario rattlesnake
  - Crotalus ericsmithi
  - Crotalus estebanensis, San Esteban Island black-tailed rattlesnake
  - Crotalus horridus, Timber rattlesnake
  - Crotalus intermedius, Mexican small-headed rattlesnake
    - Crotalus intermedius gloydi, Oaxacan small-headed rattlesnake
    - Crotalus intermedius intermedius, Totalcan small-headed rattlesnake
    - Crotalus intermedius omiltemanus, Omilteman small-headed rattlesnake
  - Crotalus lannomi, Autlan rattlesnake
  - Crotalus lepidus, Rock rattlesnake
    - Crotalus lepidus klauberi, Banded rock rattlesnake
    - Crotalus lepidus lepidus, Mottled rock rattlesnake
    - Crotalus lepidus maculosus, Durango rock rattlesnake
  - Crotalus mictlantecuhtli
  - Crotalus mitchellii, Speckled rattlesnake
    - Crotalus mitchellii mitchellii, San Lucan speckled rattlesnake
    - Crotalus mitchellii muertensis, El Muerto Island speckled rattlesnake
  - Crotalus molossus, Black-tailed rattlesnake
    - Crotalus molossus molossus, Northern black-tailed rattlesnake
    - Crotalus molossus nigrescens, Mexican black-tailed rattlesnake
    - Crotalus molossus oaxacus, Oaxacan black-tailed rattlesnake
  - Crotalus morulus, Tamaulipan rock rattlesnake
  - Crotalus oreganus, Western rattlesnake
    - Crotalus oreganus abyssus, Grand Canyon rattlesnake
    - Crotalus oreganus caliginis, Coronado Island rattlesnake
    - Crotalus oreganus cerberus, Arizona black rattlesnake
    - Crotalus oreganus concolor, Midget faded rattlesnake
    - Crotalus oreganus helleri, Southern Pacific rattlesnake
    - Crotalus oreganus lutosus, Great Basin rattlesnake
    - Crotalus oreganus oreganus, Northern Pacific rattlesnake
  - Crotalus ornatus, Eastern black-tailed rattlesnake
  - Crotalus polisi
  - Crotalus polystictus, Mexican lancehead rattlesnake
  - Crotalus pricei, Twin-spotted rattlesnake
    - Crotalus pricei miquihuanus, Eastern twin-spotted rattlesnake
    - Crotalus pricei pricei, Western twin-spotted rattlesnake
  - Crotalus pusillus, Tancitaran dusky rattlesnake
  - Crotalus pyrrhus, Southwestern speckled rattlesnake
  - Crotalus ravus, Mexican pygmy rattlesnake
    - Crotalus ravus brunneus, Oaxacan pygmy rattlesnake
    - Crotalus ravus exigus, Guerreran pygmy rattlesnake
    - Sistrurus ravus ravus, Central Plateau pygmy rattlesnake
  - Crotalus ruber, Red diamond rattlesnake
    - Crotalus ruber exsul, Cedros Island red diamond rattlesnake
    - Crotalus ruber lorenzoensis, San Lorenzo Island red diamond rattlesnake
    - Crotalus ruber lucasensis, San Lucan red diamond rattlesnake
    - Crotalus ruber ruber, Red diamond rattlesnake
  - Crotalus scutulatus, Mojave rattlesnake
    - Crotalus scutulatus salvini, Huamantlan rattlesnake
    - Crotalus scutulatus scutulatus, Mojave rattlesnake
  - Crotalus simus, Middle American rattlesnake
  - Crotalus stejnegeri, Long-tailed rattlesnake
  - Crotalus stephensi, Panamint rattlesnake
  - Crotalus tancitarensis Tancitaro rattlesnake
  - Crotalus thalassoporus Louse Island speckled rattlesnake
  - Crotalus tigris, Tiger rattlesnake
  - Crotalus tlaloci
  - Crotalus tortugensis, Tortuga Island diamond rattlesnake
  - Crotalus totonacus, Totonacan rattlesnake
  - Crotalus transversus, Cross-banded mountain rattlesnake
  - Crotalus triseriatus, Dusky rattlesnake
  - Crotalus tzabcan, Yucatán neotropical rattlesnake
  - Crotalus viridis, Prairie rattlesnake
    - Crotalus viridis nuntius, Hopi rattlesnake
    - Crotalus viridis viridis, Prairie rattlesnake
  - Crotalus willardi, Ridge-nosed rattlesnake
    - Crotalus willardi amabilis, Del Nido ridge-nosed rattlesnake
    - Crotalus willardi meridionalis, Southern ridge-nosed rattlesnake
    - Crotalus willardi obscurus, New Mexican ridge-nosed rattlesnake
    - Crotalus willardi silus, Western Chihuahuan ridge-nosed rattlesnake
    - Crotalus willardi willardi, Arizona ridge-nosed rattlesnake
- Deinagkistrodon, Hundred-pace vipers
  - Deinagkistrodon acutus, Hundred-pace viper
- Garthius
  - Garthius chaseni, Mount Kinabalu pit viper
- Gloydius Asian ground pit vipers
  - Gloydius angusticeps
  - Gloydius blomhoffii, Japanese mamushi
    - Gloydius blomhoffii blomhoffii, Japanese mamushi
    - Gloydius blomhoffii dubitatus, Tung Ling mamushi
    - Gloydius blomhoffii siniticus, Yangtze mamushi
  - Gloydius brevicaudus, Short-tailed mamushi
  - Gloydius caraganus, Karaganda pit viper
  - Gloydius caucasicus, Caucasian pit viper
  - Gloydius cognatus, Alashan pit viper
  - Gloydius halys, Siberian pit viper
    - Gloydius halys boehmei, Boehme's pit viper
    - Gloydius halys halys, Siberian pit viper
  - Gloydius himalayanus, Himalayan pit viper
  - Gloydius huangi
  - Gloydius intermedius, Central Asian pit viper
  - Gloydius lijianlii
  - Gloydius liupanensis
  - Gloydius monticola, Likiang pit viper
  - Gloydius qinlingensis
  - Gloydius rickmersi
  - Gloydius rubromaculatus
  - Gloydius saxatilis, Rock mamushi
  - Gloydius shedaoensis, Shedao island pit viper
  - Gloydius stejnegeri, Gobi pit viper
  - Gloydius strauchi, Strauch's pit viper
  - Gloydius tsushimaensis
  - Gloydius ussuriensis, Ussuri mamushi
- Hypnale, Humpnosed vipers
  - Hypnale hypnale, Humpnosed viper
  - Hypnale nepa, Sri Lankan humpnosed viper
  - Hypnale zara, Lowlands humpnosed viper
- Lachesis, Bushmasters
  - Lachesis acrochorda, Chocoan bushmaster
  - Lachesis melanocephala, Black-headed bushmaster
  - Lachesis muta, South American bushmaster
    - Lachesis muta muta, South American bushmaster
    - Lachesis muta rhombeata, Atlantic forest bushmaster. As of 2024, it has been elevated to a full species, Lachesis rhombeata
  - Lachesis stenophrys, Central American bushmaster
- Metlapilcoatlus, Jumping vipers
  - Metlapilcoatlus indomitus
  - Metlapilcoatlus mexicanus, Central American jumping pit viper
  - Metlapilcoatlus nummifer, Mexican jumping pit viper
  - Metlapilcoatlus occiduus, Guatemalan jumping pit viper
  - Metlapilcoatlus olmec, Tuxtlan jumping pit viper
- Mixcoatlus, Cloud montane pitvipers
  - Mixcoatlus barbouri, Barbour's montane pit viper
  - Mixcoatlus browni, Mexican montane pit viper
  - Mixcoatlus melanurus, Black-tailed horned pit viper
- Ophryacus, Mexican horned pit vipers
  - Ophryacus smaragdinus, Emerald horned pit viper
  - Ophryacus sphenophrys, Broad-horned pit viper
  - Ophryacus undulatus, Mexican horned pit viper
- Ovophis, Asian mountain pit vipers
  - Ovophis jenkinsi, Jenkins' mountain pitviper
  - Ovophis monticola, Mountain pit viper
    - Ovophis convictus, Indo-Malayan mountain pit viper
    - Ovophis makazayazaya, Taiwan mountain pit viper
    - Ovophis monticola monticola, Mountain pit viper
    - Ovophis monticola zhaokentangi, Gaoligong mountain pit viper
  - Ovophis okinavensis, Okinawa pit viper
  - Ovophis tonkinensis, Tonkin pit viper
  - Ovophis zayuensis, Zayuan mountain pit viper
- Porthidium, Hog-nosed pit vipers
  - Porthidium arcosae, Manabí hog-nosed pit viper
  - Porthidium dunni, Dunn's hog-nosed pit viper
  - Porthidium hespere, Colima hog-nosed pitviper
  - Porthidium lansbergii, Lansberg's hog-nosed pit viper
    - Porthidium lansbergii hutmanni
    - Porthidium lansbergii lansbergii, Lansberg's hog-nosed pit viper
    - Porthidium lansbergii rozei
  - Porthidium nasutum, Rainforest hog-nosed pit viper
  - Porthidium ophryomegas, Slender hog-nosed pit viper
  - Porthidium porrasi
  - Porthidium volcanicum, Ujarran hog-nosed pit viper
  - Porthidium yucatanicum, Yucatán hog-nosed pit viper
- Protobothrops
  - Protobothrops cornutus
  - Protobothrops dabieshanensis, Dabie Mountains pit viper
  - Protobothrops elegans, Elegant pit viper
  - Protobothrops flavoviridis
  - Protobothrops himalayanus
  - Protobothrops jerdonii, Jerdon's pit viper
    - Protobothrops jerdonii bourreti, Bourret's pit viper
    - Protobothrops jerdonii jerdonii, Jerdon's pit viper
    - Protobothrops jerdonii xanthomelas, Red-spotted pit viper
  - Protobothrops kaulbacki, Kaulback's lance-headed pit viper
  - Protobothrops kelomohy, Omkoi lance-headed pitviper
  - Protobothrops mangshanensis, Mangshan pit viper, Mt. Mang pit viper, Mang Mountain pit viper
  - Protobothrops maolanensis, Mao-lan pit viper
  - Protobothrops mucrosquamatus, Brown spotted pit viper
  - Protobothrops sieversorum, Three horned-scaled pit viper
  - Protobothrops tokarensis, Tokara habu
  - Protobothrops trungkhanhensis, Trungkhanh pit viper
  - Protobothrops xiangchengensis, Szechwan pit viper, Kham plateau pit viper
- Sistrurus, Pygmy rattlesnakes
  - Sistrurus catenatus, Massasauga
    - Sistrurus catenatus catenatus, Eastern massasauga
    - Sistrurus tergeminus edwardsii, Desert massasauga
    - Sistrurus tergeminus tergeminus, Western massasauga
  - Sistrurus miliarius, Pygmy rattlesnake
    - Sistrurus miliarius barbouri, Dusky pygmy rattlesnake
    - Sistrurus miliarius miliarius, Carolina pygmy rattlesnake
    - Sistrurus miliarius streckeri, Western pygmy rattlesnake
- Trimeresurus, Asian lanceheads (tree pit vipers)
  - Trimeresurus albolabris, White-lipped pit viper
  - Trimeresurus andalasensis
  - Trimeresurus andersoni, Nicobar mangrove pit viper
  - Trimeresurus arunachalensis
  - Trimeresurus borneensis, Bornean pit viper
  - Trimeresurus brongersmai, Brongersma's pit viper
  - Trimeresurus cantori, Cantor's pit viper
  - Trimeresurus cardamomensis
  - Trimeresurus erythrurus, Red-tailed bamboo pit viper
  - Trimeresurus fasciatus, Banded pit viper
  - Trimeresurus flavomaculatus, Philippine pit viper
    - Trimeresurus flavomaculatus flavomaculatus, Philippine pit viper
    - Trimeresurus flavomaculatus halieus
  - Trimeresurus gracilis, Kikushi habu
  - Trimeresurus gramineus, Bamboo pit viper
  - Trimeresurus gumprechti
  - Trimeresurus gunaleni
  - Trimeresurus hageni, Hagen's pit viper
  - Trimeresurus honsonensis
  - Trimeresurus insularis, White-lipped island pit viper
  - Trimeresurus kanburiensis, Kanburi pit viper
  - Trimeresurus labialis, Nicobar bamboo pit viper
  - Trimeresurus macrolepis, Large-scaled pit viper
  - Trimeresurus macrops, Large-eyed pit viper
  - Trimeresurus malabaricus, Malabar rock pit viper
  - Trimeresurus malcolmi, Malcolm's pit viper
  - Trimeresurus mcgregori, McGregor's pit viper
  - Trimeresurus medoensis, Motuo bamboo pit viper
  - Trimeresurus mutabilis
  - Trimeresurus nebularis
  - Trimeresurus phuketensis
  - Trimeresurus popeiorum, Pope's bamboo pit viper
    - Trimeresurus popeiorum barati, Barat bamboo pit viper
    - Trimeresurus popeiorum popeiorum, Pope's bamboo pit viper
  - Trimeresurus puniceus, Flat-nosed pit viper
  - Trimeresurus purpureomaculatus, Mangrove pit viper
  - Trimeresurus rubeus
  - Trimeresurus sabahi, Sabah bamboo pit viper
  - Trimeresurus salazar
  - Trimeresurus schultzei, Schultze's pit viper
  - Trimeresurus septentrionalis, Northern white-lipped pit viper
  - Trimeresurus sichuanensis
  - Trimeresurus stejnegeri, Stejneger's bamboo pit viper
    - Trimeresurus stejnegeri chenbihuii, Chen's bamboo pit viper
    - Trimeresurus stejnegeri stejnegeri, Stejneger's bamboo pit viper
  - Trimeresurus strigatus, Horseshoe pit viper
  - Trimeresurus sumatranus, Sumatran pit viper
  - Trimeresurus tibetanus, Tibetan bamboo pit viper
  - Trimeresurus trigonocephalus, Sri Lankan green pit viper
  - Trimeresurus truongsonensis
  - Trimeresurus venustus
  - Trimeresurus vogeli
  - Trimeresurus wiroti
  - Trimeresurus yingjiangensis
  - Trimeresurus yunnanensis, Yunnan bamboo pit viper
- Tropidolaemus, Temple pit vipers
  - Tropidolaemus huttoni, Hutton's pit viper
  - Tropidolaemus laticinctus, Broad-banded temple pit viper
  - Tropidolaemus subannulatus, Bornean keeled green pit viper
  - Tropidolaemus wagleri, Wagler's pit viper
