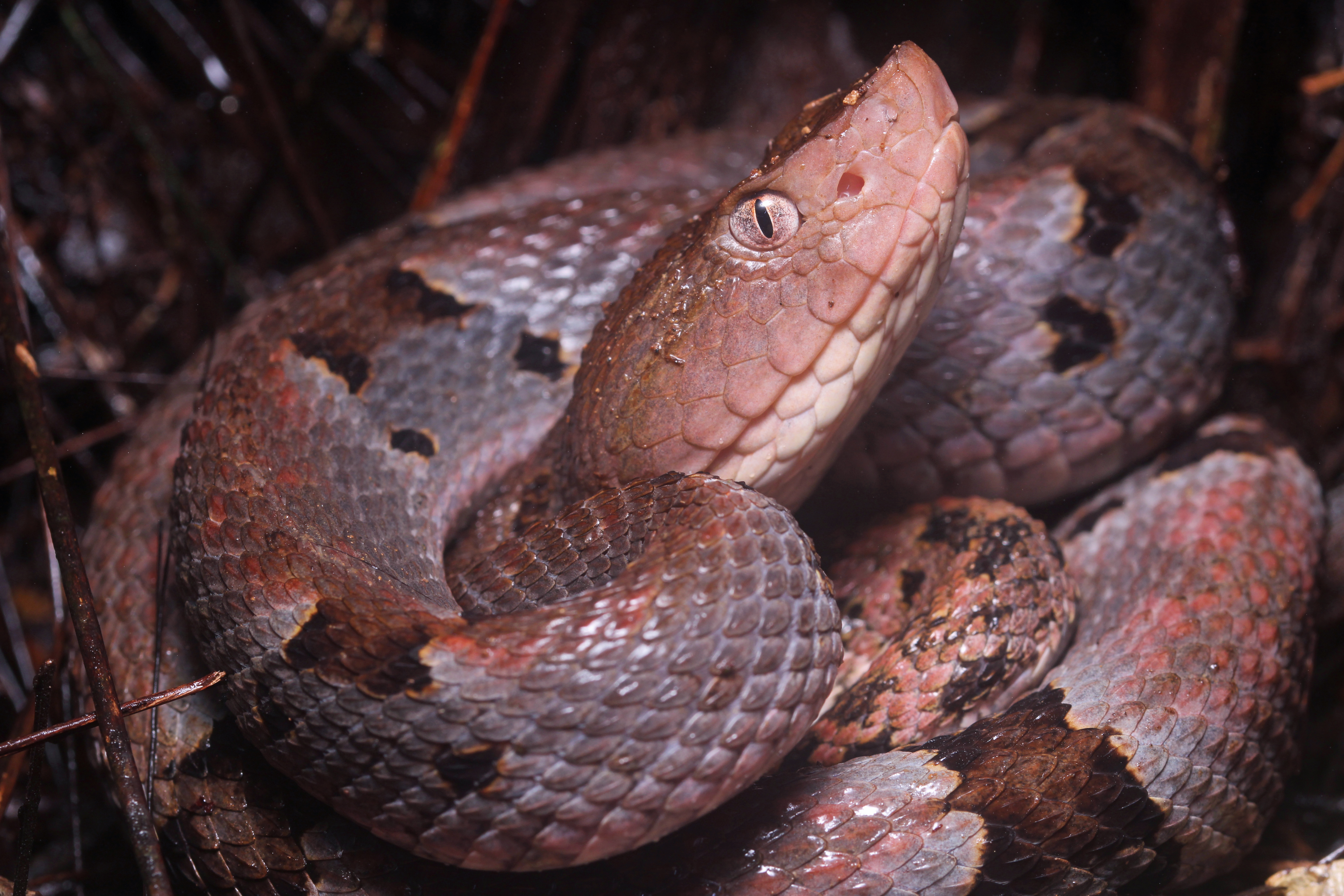

Scientific classification
- Kingdom: Animalia
- Phylum: Chordata
- Class: Reptilia
- Order: Squamata
- Suborder: Serpentes
- Family: Viperidae
- Genus: Bothrops
- Species: B. oligobalius

Binomial name
- Bothrops oligobalius Dal Vechio, Prates, Grazziotin, Graboski & Rodrigues, 2021

= Bothrops oligobalius =

Species of pit viper

Bothrops oligobalius is a species of pit viper from Amapá, Brazil. It has been sighted in the Apaporis River, on the boundary between Brazil and Colombia.

== Description ==
Bothrops oligobalius has a robust body, with a snout-vent length of 24.5 - 80.5 cm and a tail length of 3.5 - 11.3 cm. Their pattern consists of 9 - 13 trapezoidal marks on each side and a checkered pattern on their underside.

== Sexual dimorphism ==
Bothrops oligobalius exhibits sexual dimorphism through scale count, with females generally having more ventral scales than males, and males generally having more subcaudal scales than females.

== Etymology ==
The name 'oligobalius' derives from 'oligos', the Greek word for 'few', and 'balios', the Greek word for 'spotted' or 'dappled'. The combination, meaning 'few spots', references the fact that B. oligobalius displays less markings than B. brazili.
