= Protobothrops jerdonii bourreti =

Scientific classification
- Kingdom: Animalia
- Phylum: Chordata
- Class: Reptilia
- Order: Squamata
- Suborder: Serpentes
- Family: Viperidae
- Genus: Protobothrops
- Species: P. jerdonii
- Subspecies: P. j. bourreti

Trinomial name
- Protobothrops jerdonii bourreti (Klemmer, 1963)

Synonyms
- Trimeresurus jerdonii meridionalis Bourret, 1935; Trimeresurus jerdonii bourreti Klemmer, 1963; Protobothrops jerdonii bourreti — Welch, 1988

Subspecies of snake

Protobothrops jerdonii bourreti, commonly known as Bourret's pitviper, is a subspecies of venomous pit viper in the family Viperidae. The subspecies is endemic to Vietnam.

== Etymology ==
The subspecific name, bourreti, is in honor of French herpetologist René Léon Bourret.

== Description ==
The scalation of P. j. bourreti includes 21-23 rows of dorsal scales at midbody, 189-192 ventral scales, 65-72 subcaudal scales, and 7-8 supralabial scales.

== Geographic range ==
P. j. bourreti is found in Northwestern Vietnam (in the provinces of Lào Cai and Lai Châu), and possibly also in adjacent China] (Yunnan). The type locality given is "Chapa" (Tonkin, Vietnam).

== Taxonomy ==
The scientific name, P. j. bourreti (Klemmer, 1963), is a replacement name for Trimeresurus j. meridionalis Bourret, 1935.

== See also ==
- List of crotaline species and subspecies
- Snakebite
