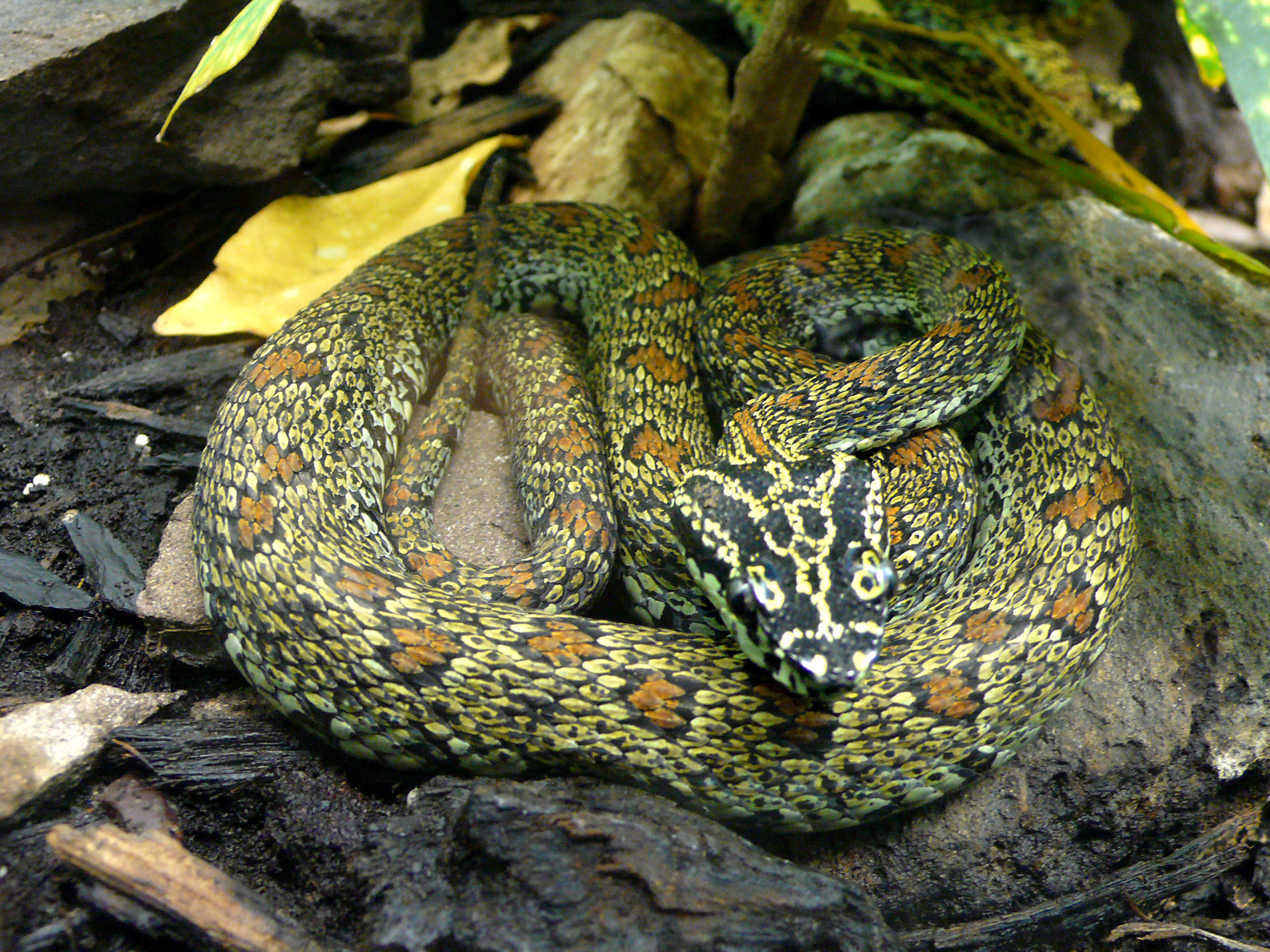

Scientific classification
- Kingdom: Animalia
- Phylum: Chordata
- Class: Reptilia
- Order: Squamata
- Suborder: Serpentes
- Family: Viperidae
- Genus: Protobothrops
- Species: P. jerdonii
- Subspecies: P. j. xanthomelas

Trinomial name
- Protobothrops jerdonii xanthomelas Günther, 1889

Synonyms
- Trimeresurus xanthomelas Günther, 1889; Trimeresurus jerdonii xanthomelas – Mell, 1931; Protobothrops jerdonii xanthomelas – Welch, 1988

= Protobothrops jerdonii xanthomelas =

Subspecies of snake

Protobothrops jerdonii xanthomelas is a venomous pit viper subspecies endemic to China.

== Description ==
Adults may attain a total length of 31 in (79 cm), which includes a tail 5 in (13 cm) long.

The scalation includes 21-23 rows of dorsal scales at midbody, 176-188 ventral scales, 54-67 subcaudal scales, and 7-8 supralabial scales.

== Geographic range ==
Found in Central and southern China, in the provinces of Henan, Shaanxi, Gansu, Sichuan, Guizhou, Hubei, and Guangxi. The type locality given is "Ichang" (=Yichang Shi, Hubei, China).

== See also ==
- List of crotaline species and subspecies
- Snakebite
