= Crotalus tlaloci =

Scientific classification
- Domain: Eukaryota
- Kingdom: Animalia
- Phylum: Chordata
- Class: Reptilia
- Order: Squamata
- Suborder: Serpentes
- Family: Viperidae
- Genus: Crotalus
- Species: C. tlaloci

Binomial name
- Crotalus tlaloci Bryson et al., 2014

Species of Mexican rattlesnake

Crotalus tlaloci is a species of rattlesnake from Mexico. The species is named after Tláloc, the Aztec god of rain. As with all rattlesnakes, it is venomous.

== Description ==
Crotalus tlaloci can be distinguished from similar species of snakes, such as C. triseriatus, by specific scale counts, a proportionately smaller rattle, and a proportionally longer tail. It can also be told apart by a dark narrowing marking near its eye.

== Habitat ==
Crotalus tlaloci is known to inhabit open areas in cloud forests and humid oak-pine forests. Usually it inhabits areas with broad-leaf oaks and dense undergrowth.
