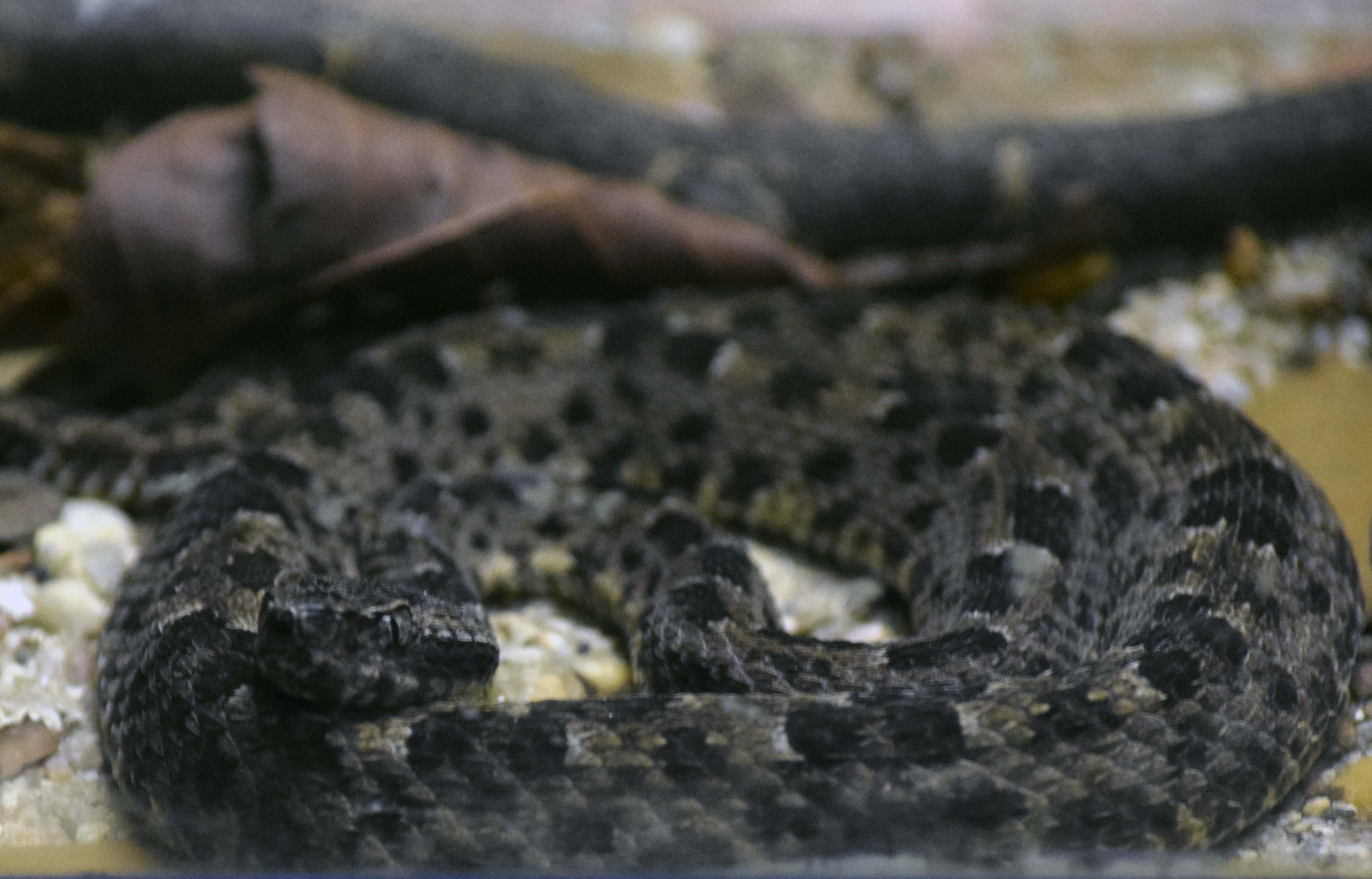

Scientific classification
- Kingdom: Animalia
- Phylum: Chordata
- Class: Reptilia
- Order: Squamata
- Suborder: Serpentes
- Family: Viperidae
- Genus: Bothrops
- Species: B. marmoratus

Binomial name
- Bothrops marmoratus Da Silva & Rodrigues, 2008

= Bothrops marmoratus =

Species of snake

Bothrops marmoratus, also known as the marbled lancehead, is a species of snake in the family Viperidae. It is native to Brazil.

== Taxonomy ==
The specific epithet of this species is a reference to the fact that this species pigmentation looks marbled. The holotype for the species was an adult female collected in Ipameri in Brazil. It belongs to the Bothrops neuwidi species group.

== Distribution ==
The species is known to inhabit only the state of Goiás in Brazil.

== Ecology ==
The snake is nocturnal and viviparous.
