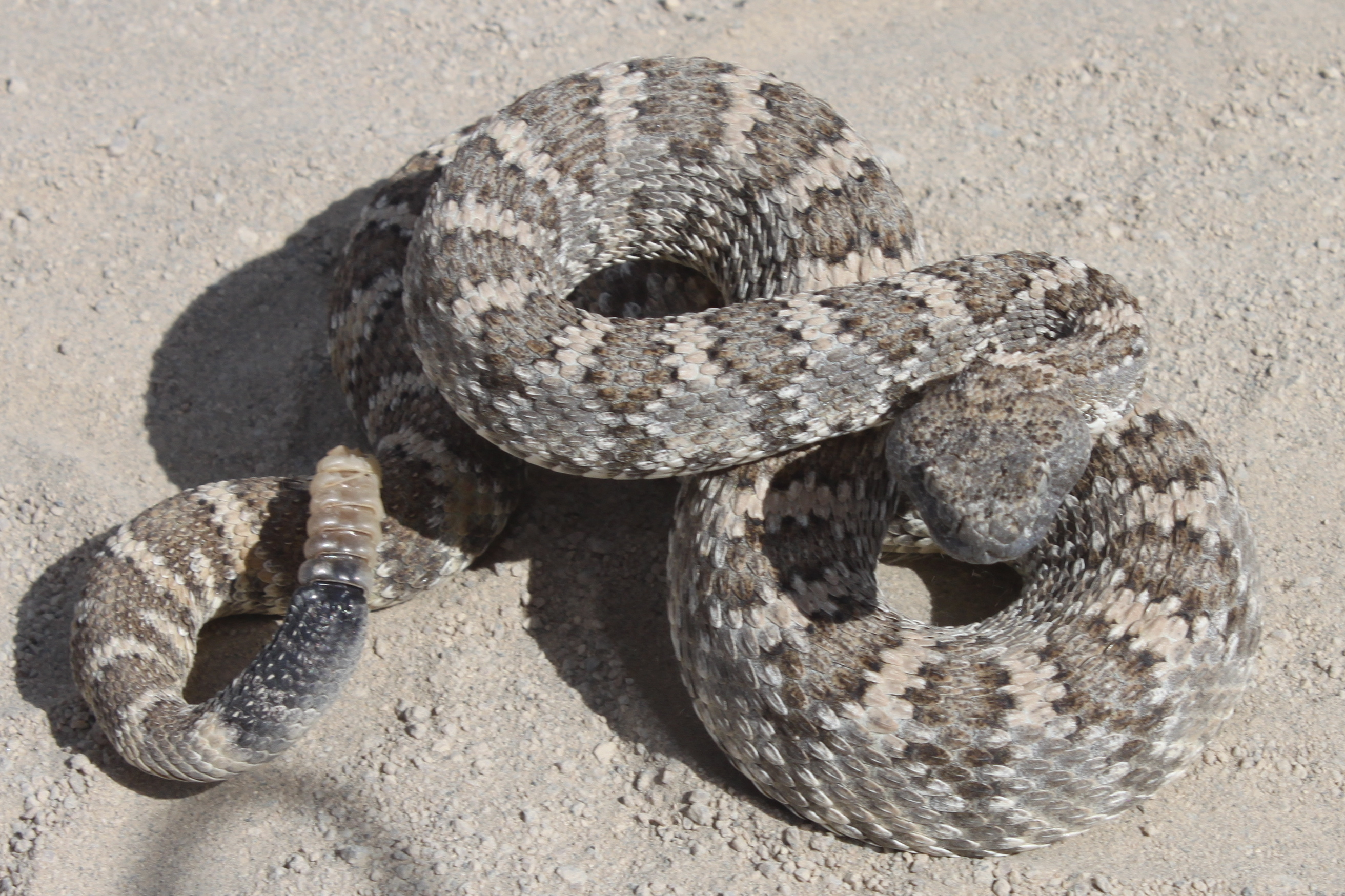

Conservation status
- Apparently Secure (NatureServe)

Scientific classification
- Kingdom: Animalia
- Phylum: Chordata
- Class: Reptilia
- Order: Squamata
- Suborder: Serpentes
- Family: Viperidae
- Genus: Crotalus
- Species: C. stephensi

Binomial name
- Crotalus stephensi Klauber, 1930

Synonyms
- Crotalus confluentus stephensi Klauber, 1930; Crotalus mitchellii stephensi — Klauber, 1936; Crotalus mitchellii stephensi — Schmidt, 1953; Crotalus mitchellii stephensi — McCrystal & McCoid, 1986; Crotalus stephensi — Douglas et al., 2007; Crotalus stephensi — Beaman & Hayes, 2008

= Crotalus stephensi =

Species of snake

Crotalus stephensi, also known as the Panamint Rattlesnake, is a venomous pitviper species found in central and southern Nevada and adjacent California. Other common names include Owens Valley rattlesnake and tiger rattlesnake (not to be confused with C. tigris).

== Etymology ==
The specific name, stephensi, is in honor of Frank Stephens (1849–1937), curator emeritus of the San Diego Society of Natural History.

== Description ==
Adults of C. stephensi are 58 to 132 cm (23 to 52 in) in total length (including tail), with an average of 60 to 91 cm (24 to 36 in).

According to Klauber (1936), this species is characterized by the absence of the vertical light line on the posterior edge of the prenasal and first supralabial scales. The supraocular scales are pitted, sutured, or with the outer edges broken.

The color pattern consists of a straw, tan, buff, brown, or gray ground color, overlaid with a series of buff, gray, brown, or deep red-brown blotches. Often, gray suffusions occur on the sides of the body and head, and a scattering of black-tipped scales occur on the back, especially at the edges of the blotches.

== Geographic range ==
Crotalus stephensi is found in desert-mountain areas of the eastern slopes of the Sierra Nevada from Mono County, California, east to Nye County, Nevada, south through southwestern Nevada, southeast to Clark County, Nevada, and southwest to central San Bernardino County, California at 900 to 2,400 m (3,000 to 7,900 ft) altitude.

== Feeding ==
The diet of C. stephensi consists of small mammals, lizards, and birds.

== Reproduction ==
Crotalus stephensi is ovoviviparous, and the young are born in July and August. Neonates are about 25 cm in total length.

== See also ==
- Snakebite
