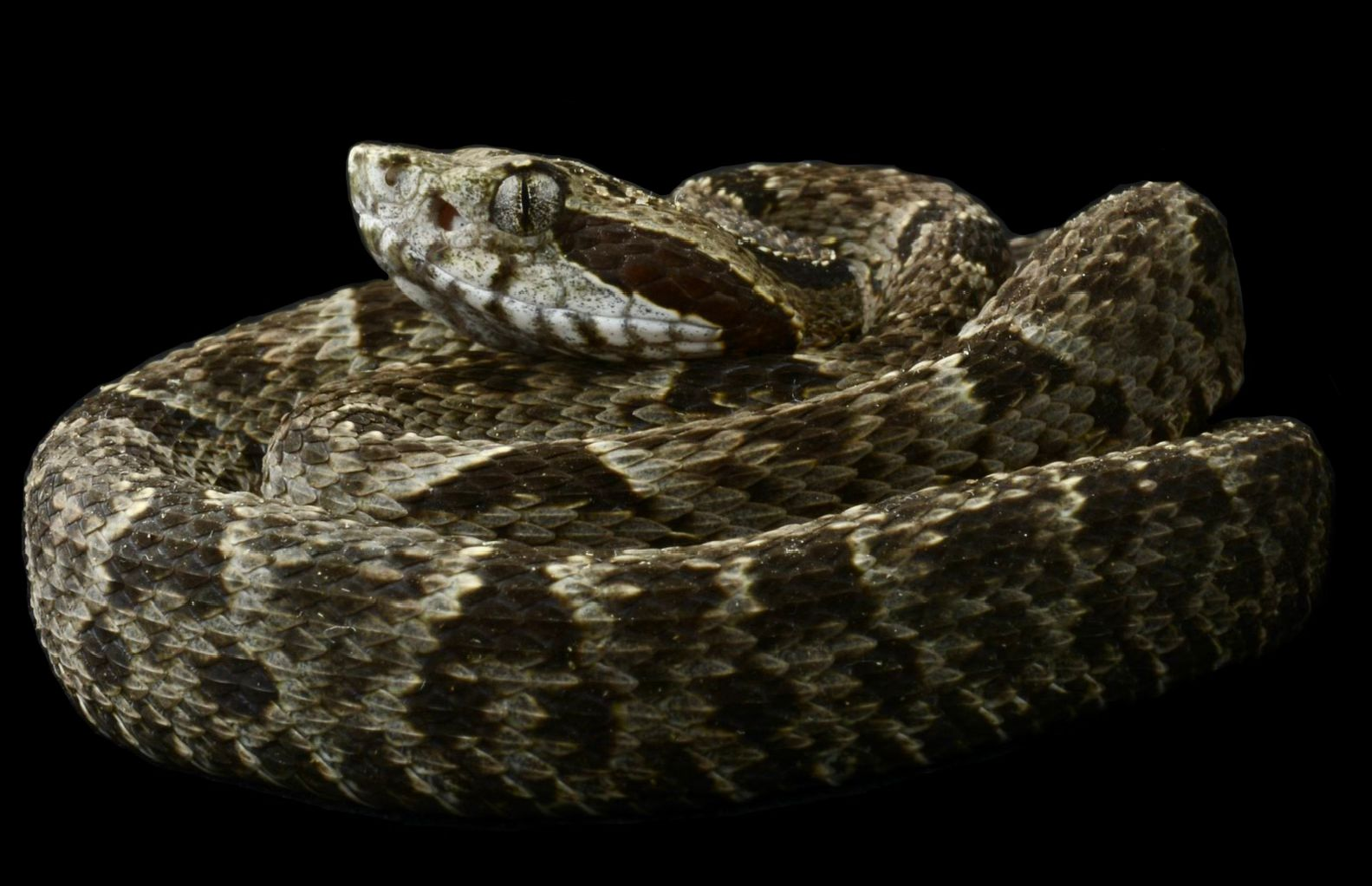
- Rareza preandina in Carrasco National Park

Scientific classification
- Kingdom: Animalia
- Phylum: Chordata
- Class: Reptilia
- Order: Squamata
- Suborder: Serpentes
- Family: Viperidae
- Genus: Bothrops
- Species: B. monsignifer

Binomial name
- Bothrops monsignifer Timms, Chaparro, Venegas, Salazar-Valenzuela, Scrocchi, Cuevas, Leynaud & Carrasco, 2019

= Bothrops monsignifer =

Species of snake

Bothrops monsignifer is a species of snake in the family Viperidae. It is native to Peru and Bolivia.

== Taxonomy ==
The specific epithet for the species is composed of the Latin words for mountain(mons) and fire (ignifer 'fire-carrying'), which together mean volcano, in reference to the place where the first specimen in Bolivia was photographed, Refugio Los Volcanes in Santa Cruz.

== Distribution and habitat ==
The species is found in Cordillera Oriental of the Central Andes from southern Peru to central Bolivia. It is restricted to montane forests with lower humidity and which lack large trees.

== Gallery ==
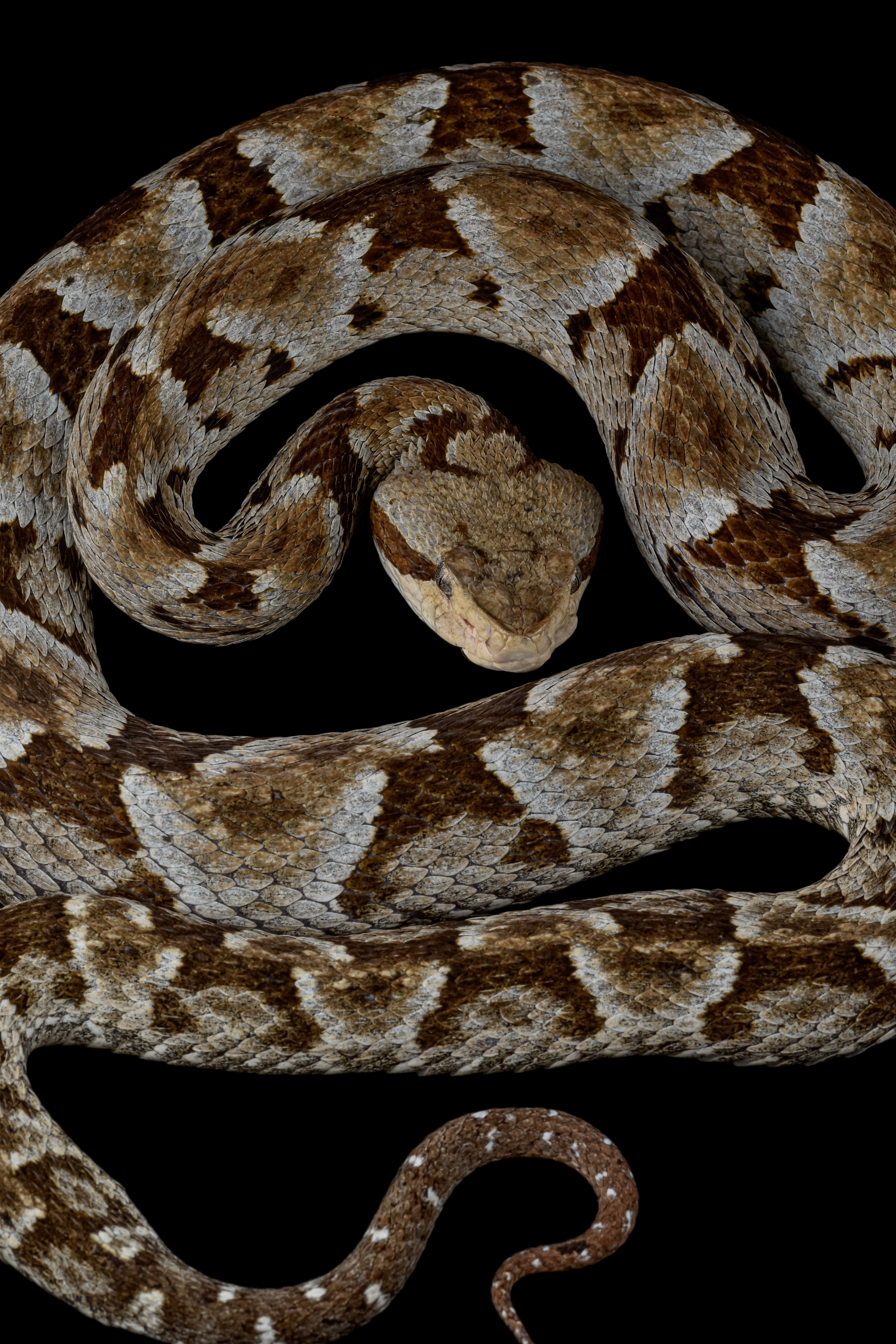
Rareza preandina in Carrasco National Park

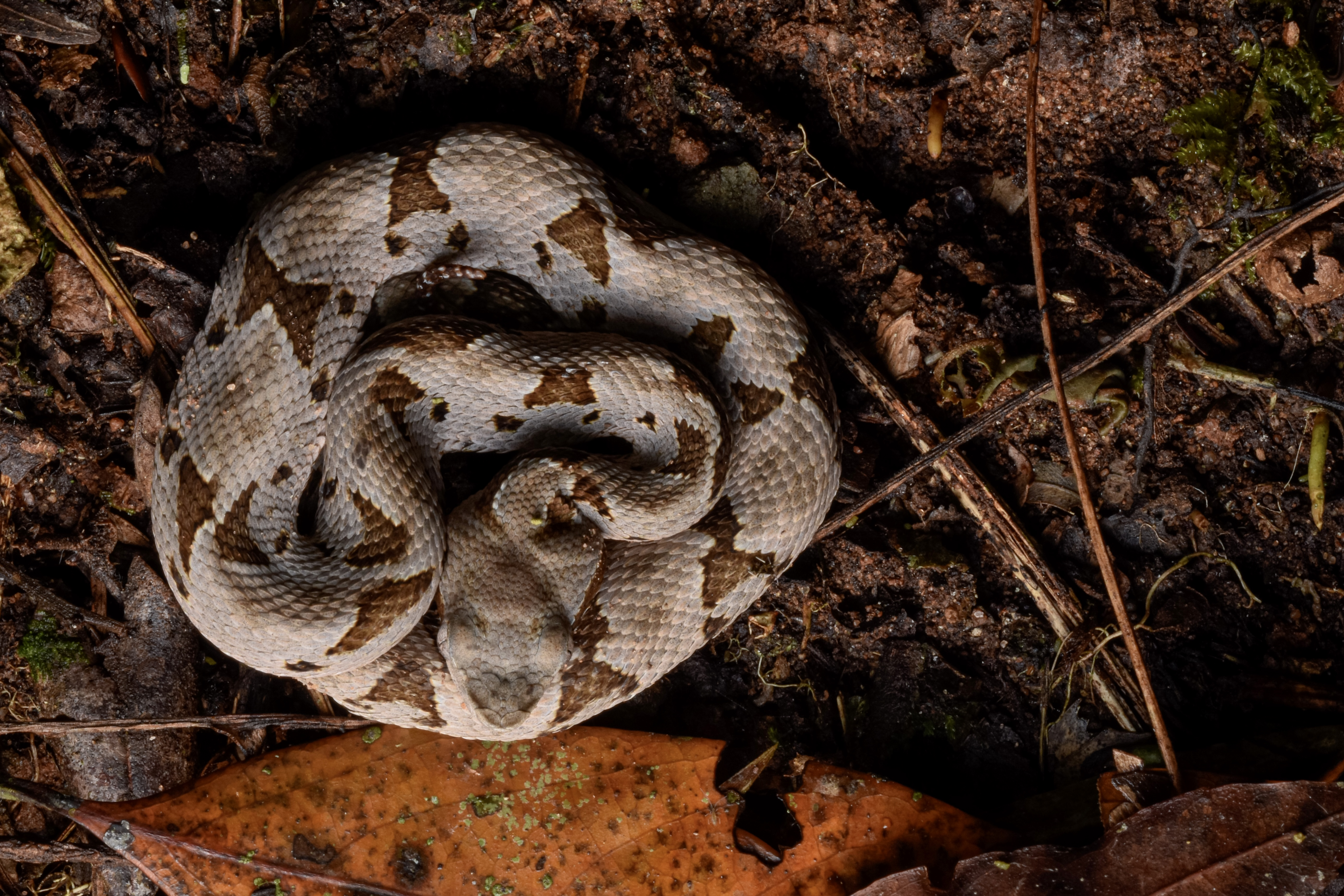
Juvenile, Amboró National Park

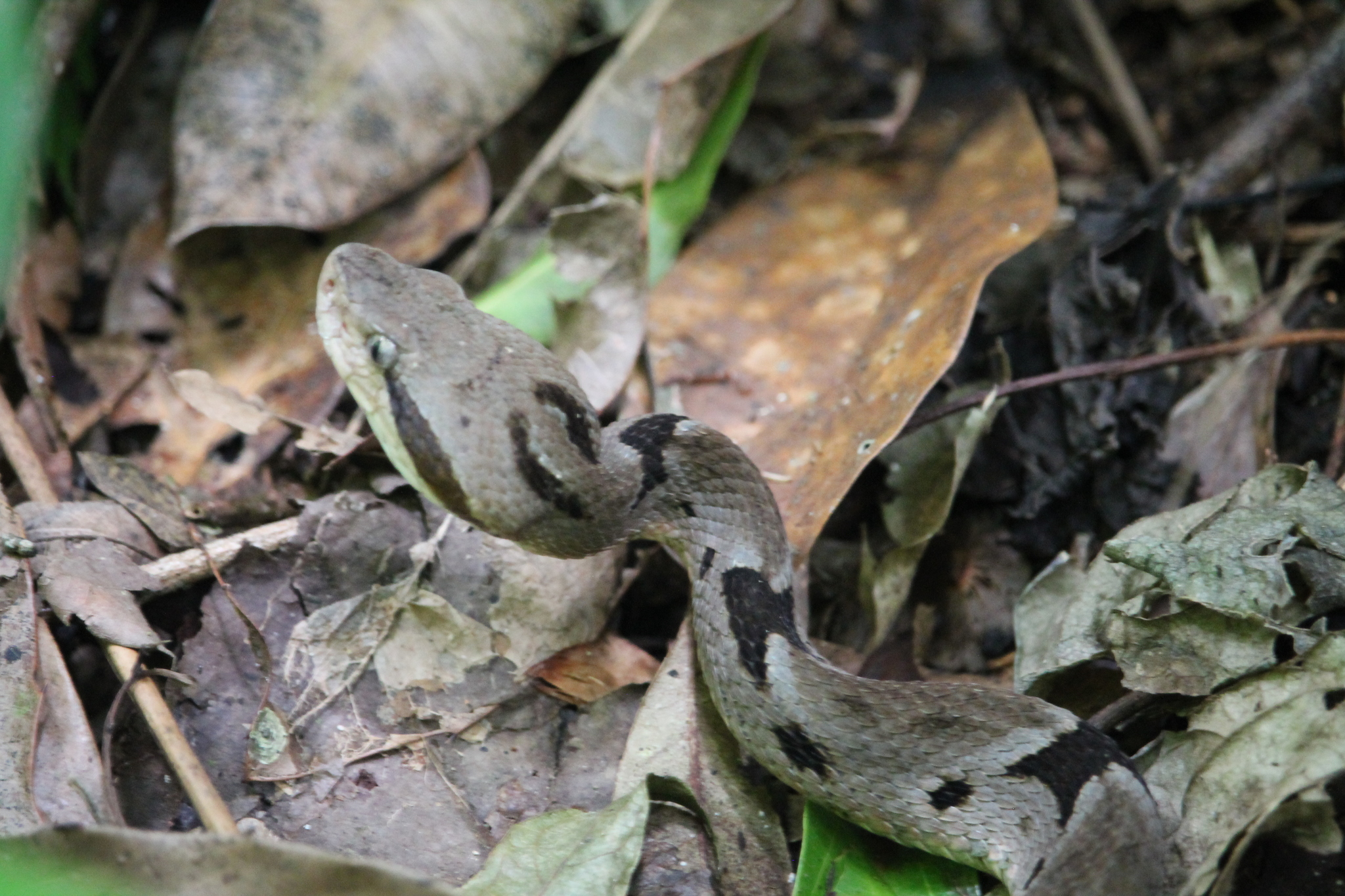
Rareza preandina in Bolivia

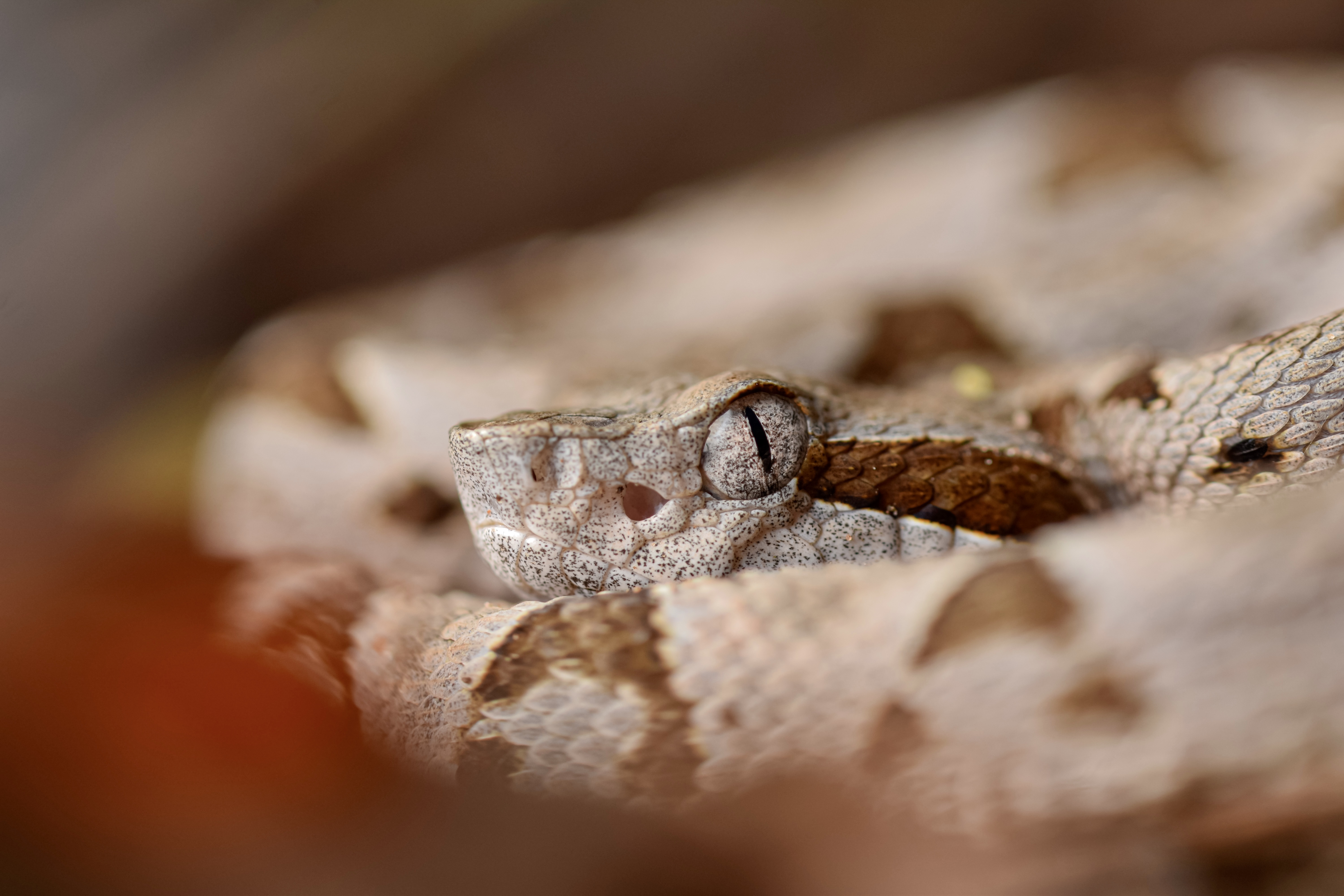

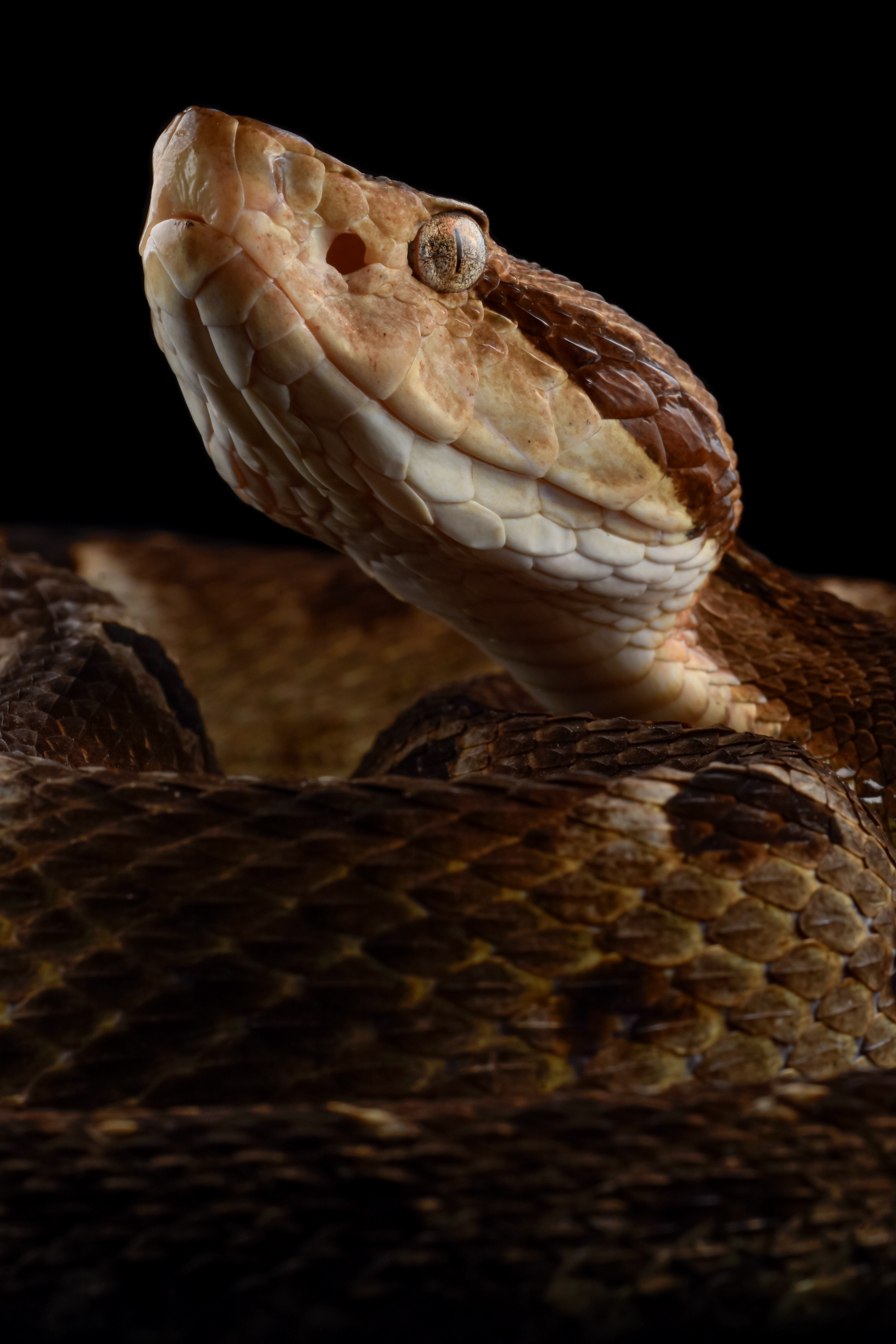

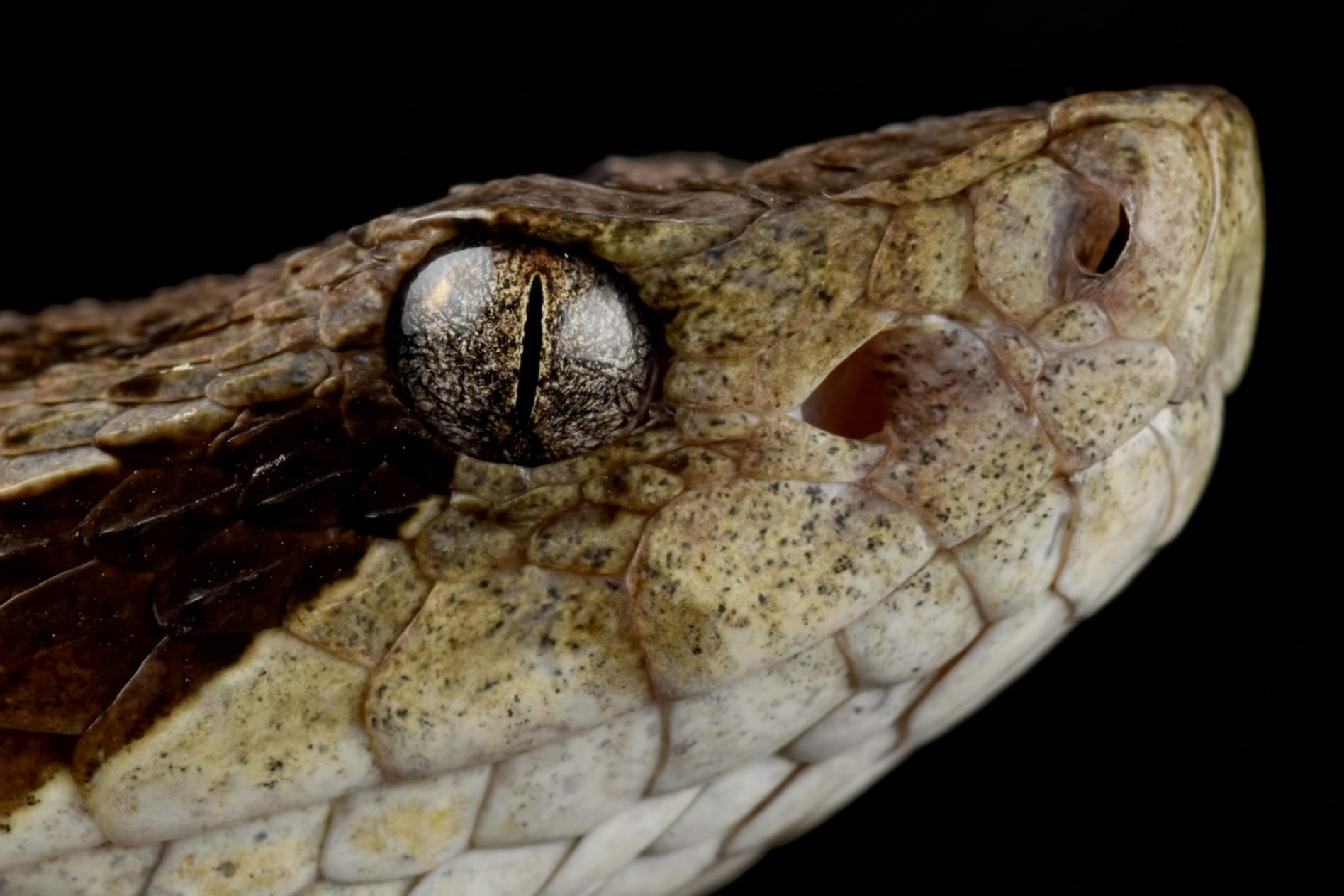
Close-up
