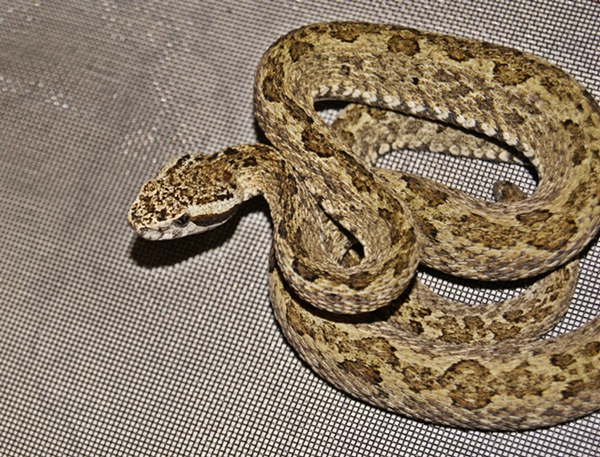

Scientific classification
- Kingdom: Animalia
- Phylum: Chordata
- Class: Reptilia
- Order: Squamata
- Suborder: Serpentes
- Family: Viperidae
- Genus: Bothrops
- Species: B. venezuelensis

Binomial name
- Bothrops venezuelensis Sandner-Montilla, 1952

= Bothrops venezuelensis =

Venezuelan lancehead

Species of snake

Bothrops venezuelensis, or the Venezuelan lancehead, is a species of venomous snake in the family Viperidae. It is endemic to South America.

== Toxicology ==
There is not much known about the dangerousness of the venom to humans, but potentially lethal envenoming is possible. The venom of B. venezuelensis contains procoagulants, possibly also myotoxins and cytotoxic substances. This species is associated with a high snakebite-related morbidity and mortality in Venezuela, there's a report of a patient bitten by a juvenile, he had local swelling, severe pain, endothelial damage, excessive fibrinolysis, and incoagulable blood within 1.5 hours after the bite. He also had AKI with macroscopic hematuria, fluid overload resulted in pulmonary edema, requiring intermittent ventilation and diuretic treatment with furosemide.

== Geographic range ==
It is found in Colombia and northern Venezuela.

The type locality is " 'Boca de Tigre', Serranía de El Avila, Distrito Capital, Venezuela ".
