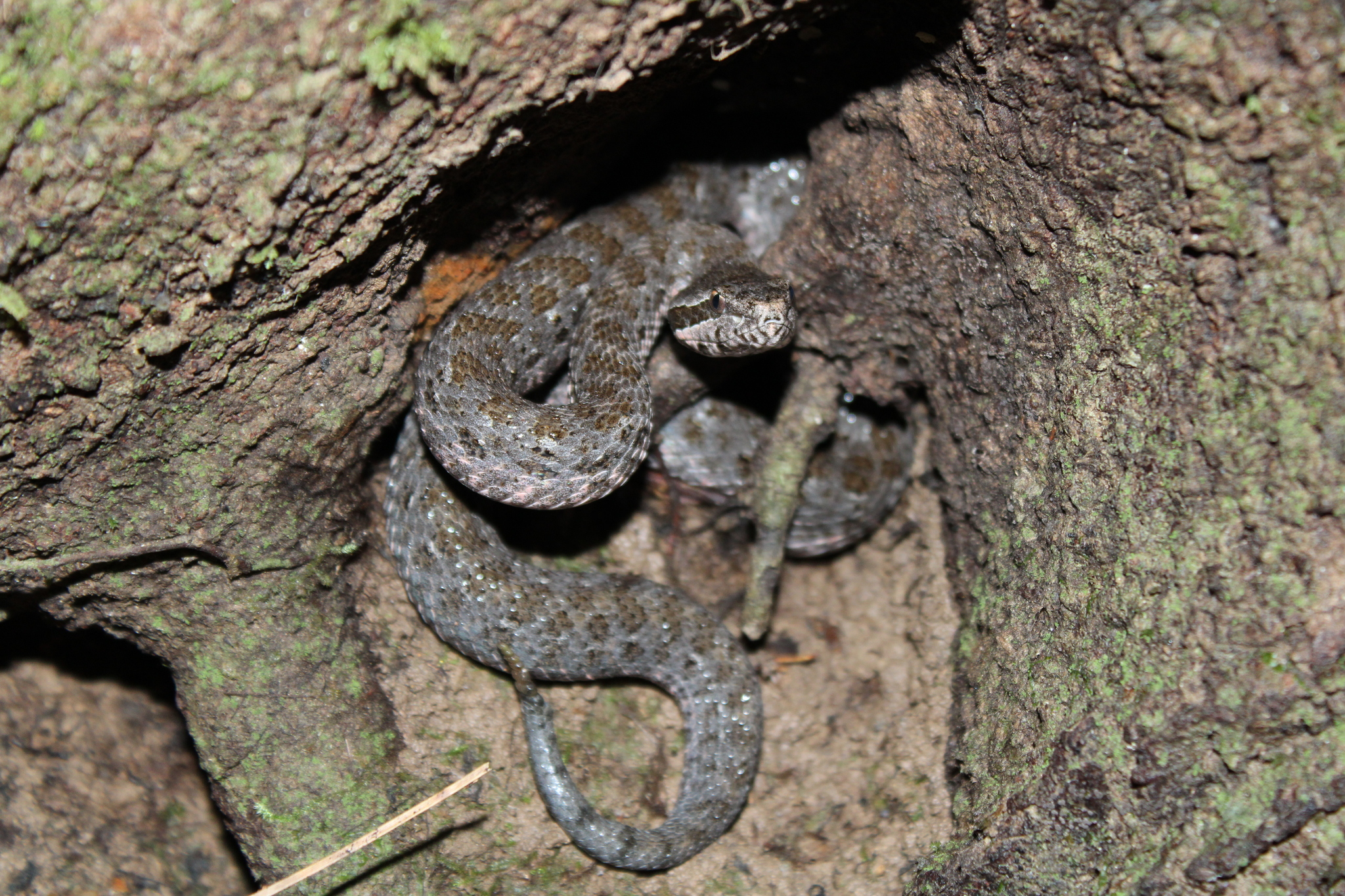

Scientific classification
- Kingdom: Animalia
- Phylum: Chordata
- Class: Reptilia
- Order: Squamata
- Suborder: Serpentes
- Family: Viperidae
- Genus: Crotalus
- Species: C. campbelli

Binomial name
- Crotalus campbelli Bryson, Linkem, Dorcas, Lathrop, Jones, Alvarado-Díaz, Grünwald & Murphy, 2014

= Crotalus campbelli =

Species of snake

Crotalus campbelli is a species of venomous snake in the genus Crotalus found in Mexico.

== Etymology ==
The specific name, campbelli, honors herpetologist Jonathan A. Campbell for his extensive research on rattlesnakes and his support to herpetology students in Mexico.

== Description ==
Crotalus campbelli can be distinguished from other members of the C. triseriatus species group by the presence of intercanthals, an infrequently divided upper preocular, and a combination of other morphological characters. Males typically have 150–154 ventrals and 31–32 subcaudals, while females have 147–152 ventrals and 22–26 subcaudals. The species features a small rattle, a long tail, pale interspaces between dorsal and lateral blotches, heavy venter mottling, and a dark proximal rattle and underside of the tail.

== Geographical range ==
Crotalus campbelli is found in the Trans-Mexican Volcanic Belt, locally known as the Sierra Nevada, in Mexico. It inhabits open rocky areas near montane forests at middle to high elevations, specifically in the states of Jalisco, Colima, and Nayarit.

== Ecology and behavior ==
This species likely feeds on small mammals and lizards. Due to its recent description in 2014, much of its unique ecology and biology remains to be studied.
