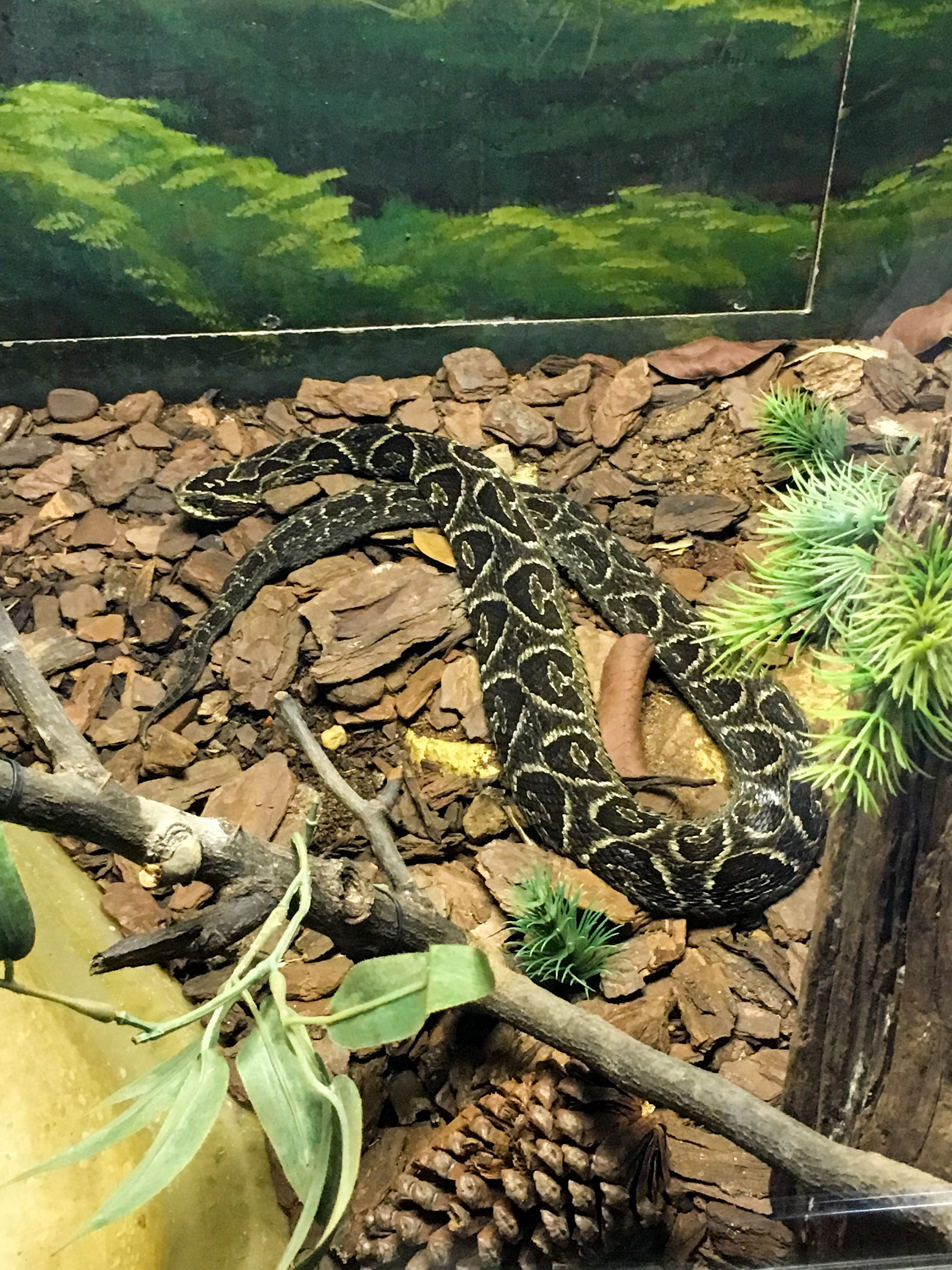

Conservation status
- Least Concern (IUCN 3.1)

Scientific classification
- Kingdom: Animalia
- Phylum: Chordata
- Class: Reptilia
- Order: Squamata
- Suborder: Serpentes
- Family: Viperidae
- Genus: Bothrops
- Species: B. fonsecai

Binomial name
- Bothrops fonsecai Hoge & Belluomini, 1959

Synonyms
- Rhinocerophis fonsecai — Fenwick et al., 2009

= Bothrops fonsecai =

Species of snake

Bothrops fonsecai, also known commonly as Fonseca's lancehead, is a species of venomous snake in the family Viperidae. The species is endemic to Brazil.

== Etymology ==
The specific name, fonsecai, is in honor of Dr. Flavio da Fonseca, who was head of the laboratory of parasitology at the Instituto Butantan in São Paulo, Brazil.

== Geographic range ==
B. fonsecai is found in the Brazilian states of Minas Gerais, Rio de Janeiro, and São Paulo.

== Habitat ==
The preferred natural habitat of B. fonsecai is forest, at altitudes up to 1,700 m (5,600 ft).

== Description ==
Adults of B. fonsecai have a total length (including tail) of about 1 m (39 in).

== Behavior ==
B. fonsecai is terrestrial.

== Diet ==
B. fonsecai preys upon small mammals.

== Reproduction ==
B. fonsecai is ovoviviparous. Litter size is 14 or less.
