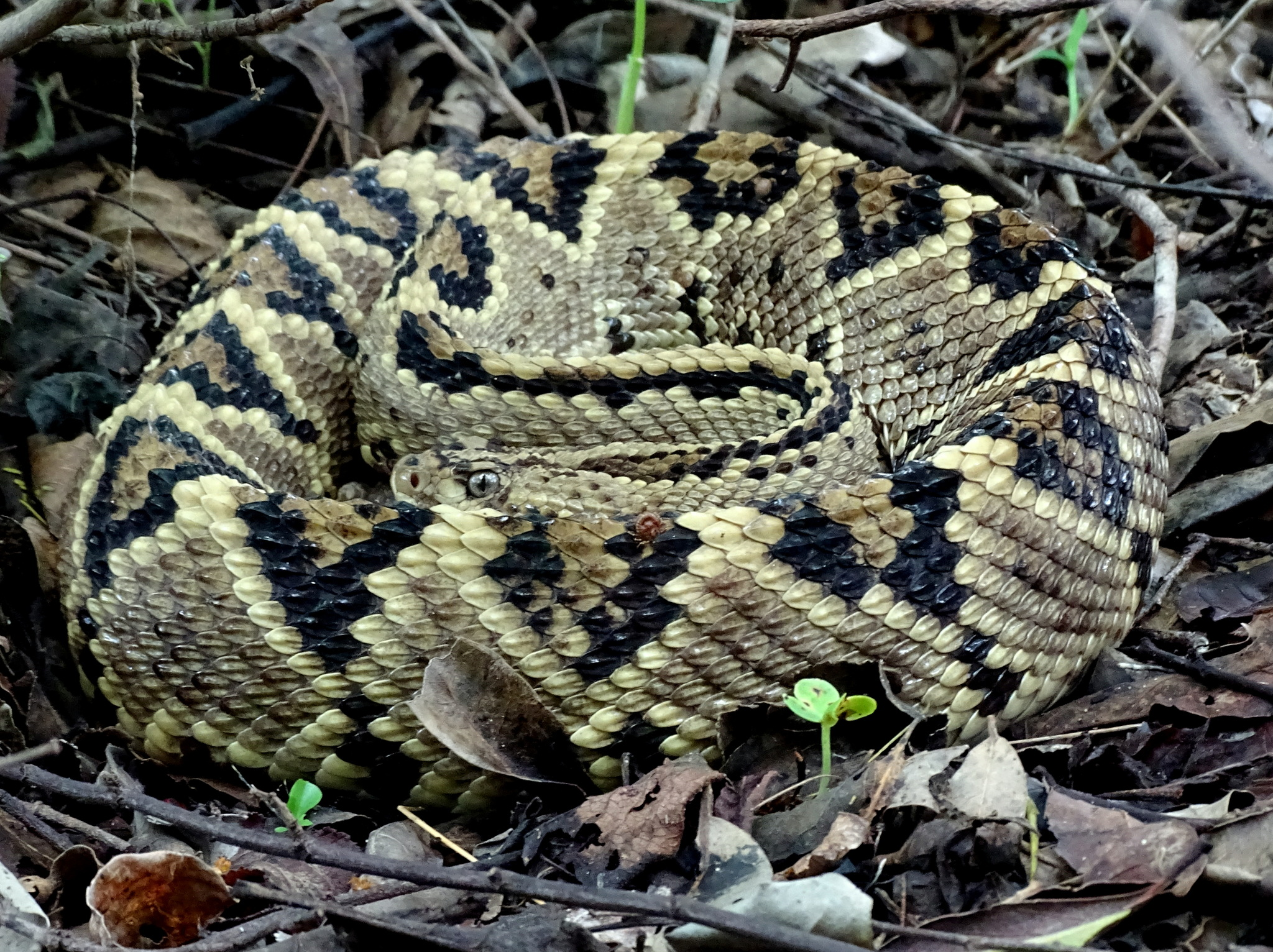
- Crotalus ehecatl in Mexico

Scientific classification
- Kingdom: Animalia
- Phylum: Chordata
- Class: Reptilia
- Order: Squamata
- Suborder: Serpentes
- Family: Viperidae
- Genus: Crotalus
- Species: C. ehecatl

Binomial name
- Crotalus ehecatl Carbajal-Márquez, Cedeño-Vázquez, Martínez-Arce, Neri-Castro & Machkour-M’Rabet, 2020

= Crotalus ehecatl =

Species of snake

Crotalus ehecatl, the Tehuantepec Isthmus Neotropical rattlesnake, is a species of venomous snake in the genus Crotalus found in Mexico.

== Etymology ==
The specific name, ehecatl, comes from the Nahuatl word "Ehēcatl" meaning "the wind" or "Lord of the wind", referring to the Aztec deity associated with wind.

== Description ==
Crotalus ehecatl is a large and heavy-bodied snake, with adults reaching lengths of up to 165.3 cm (approximately 65 inches). The body pattern consists of a series of dark, diamond-shaped blotches on a lighter background, which can vary from gray to brown. The head features a distinctive lance-shaped pattern.

This species exhibits some levels of sexual dimorphism, with males having significantly longer tails than females. Males also have more subcaudal and anterior intersupraocular scales. On the other hand, the species displays no sexual dimorphism when related to snout-vent length or head length. Its method of reproduction is ovoviviparous.

The diet consists primarily of mammals, with feeding occurring mainly during the rainy season as it is related to reproduction. Additionally, mammals eaten can belong to any stage of life, accounting for the species' large size at birth. Rodents are one of its most common sources of food. Activity patterns are crepuscular and nocturnal during warmer months, and diurnal during cooler months.

== Geographical range ==
The Tehuantepec Isthmus Neotropical rattlesnake is endemic to Mexico, specifically distributed along the Pacific versant from central-south Oaxaca, southward across the Tehuantepec Isthmus to west of Tonalá, Chiapas, and in the Grijalva River basin reaching Comitán, Chiapas. It inhabits tropical deciduous forests and seasonal rainforests, preferring open canopy habitats with rocky outcroppings.

Its range has been compared to that of C. culminatus and C. simus.

Possible threats to the species include climate change and disease, as well as encroachment from humans or other, non-native species.
