= Crotalus estebanensis =

Conservation status
- Least Concern (IUCN 3.1)

Scientific classification
- Kingdom: Animalia
- Phylum: Chordata
- Class: Reptilia
- Order: Squamata
- Suborder: Serpentes
- Family: Viperidae
- Genus: Crotalus
- Species: C. estebanensis

Binomial name
- Crotalus estebanensis Klauber, 1949
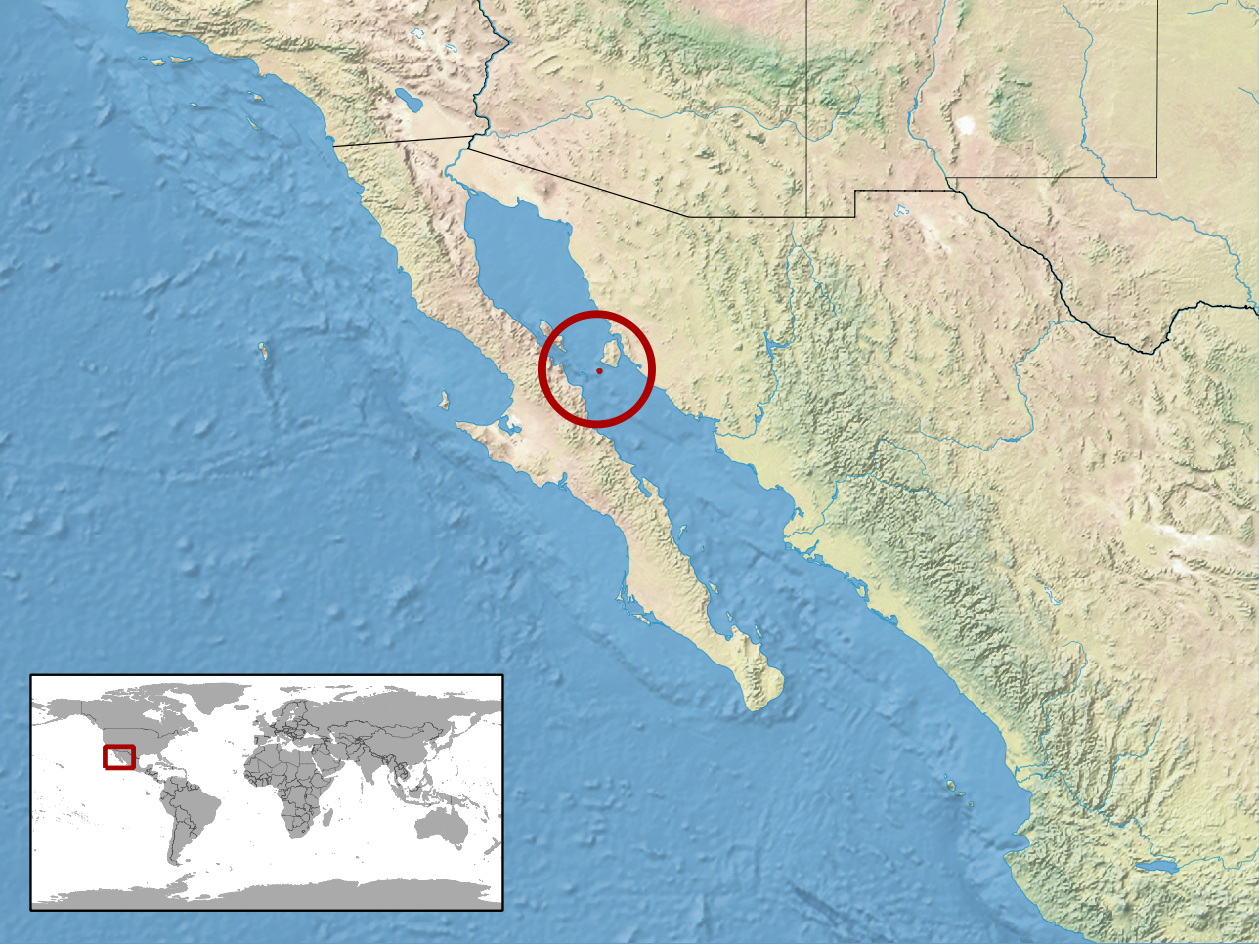
- Location of San Estéban Island

Synonyms
- Crotalus molossus estebanensis – Klauber, 1949

Species of snake

Crotalus estebanensis, commonly known as the San Esteban Island rattlesnake, is a pit viper species endemic to San Estéban Island, Mexico. Like all other pit vipers, it is venomous.

== Description ==
Adults grow to a maximum reported length of 98.2 cm.

== Geographic range ==
It s known only from the type locality, which is "San Estéban Island, Gulf of California, Mexico.

== Conservation status ==
This species is classified as least concern on the IUCN Red List of Threatened Species (v3.1, 2001). Species are listed as such due to their wide distribution, presumed large population, or because they are unlikely to be declining fast enough to qualify for listing in a more threatened category. The population trend is stable. Year assessed: 2007
