= Lachesis brachystoma =

Lachesis brachystoma is an outdated scientific name that may refer to the following two species of hognosed pitvipers:

- Porthidium nasutum
- Porthidium lansbergii
