= Porthidium arcosae =

Scientific classification
- Kingdom: Animalia
- Phylum: Chordata
- Class: Reptilia
- Order: Squamata
- Suborder: Serpentes
- Family: Viperidae
- Genus: Porthidium
- Species: P. arcosae

Binomial name
- Porthidium arcosae Schätti & Kramer, 1993

Endangered species of snake endemic to Ecuador

Porthidium arcosae, or the Manabí hognose pitviper, is an endangered species of hognose pit viper endemic to the central Pacific coast of Ecuador. Originally considered a subspecies of P. lansbergii, P. arcosae was elevated to species rank in 1993.

== Description ==
Porthidium arcosae is a small, triangular headed snake with an upturned snout and alternating beige and brown rectangular markings along its dorsal side. In terms of total length (snout to tail tip) males can reach around 77 cm, with females reaching around 63 cm.

This snake can be distinguished from similar species via its various scale morphologies.

== Venom ==
As with all pitvipers, Porthidium archosae is venomous. Its venom is hemotoxic and causes intense pain, inflammation, and hematomas in humans, but does not appear to be deadly and may be recoverable without the use of antivenom – although this is not covered extensively and is fairly controversia]. They only bite if harassed, instead having evolved to be camouflaged first and foremost.

== Conservation ==
Accurate to March 2026, Porthidium arcosae is considered endangered due to its small habitat range which is shrinking and lowering in quality and the threat of intentional killing from humans.

== Habitat ==
Common in Ecuador, the Manabí hognose pitviper is frequently seen at the end of the rainy season, between April and May. It is generally nocturnal, but may be sighted after heavy rainfall.

Preferring to move on the ground, this snake is considered terrestrial. When resting, they tend to choose hiding spots such as under debris and trunks.

== Diet ==
Ambush hunters, the Manabí hognose pitviper is known eat mostly rodents in adulthood as well as occasionally partaking in cannibalism. Juveniles are known to eat lizards such as seven-lined ameivas, knobbed Pacific iguanas and Peru desert tegus. There is also evidence of these pit vipers eating frogs, other snake species and birds.

== Reproduction ==
Male Manabí hognose pitvipers have been seen to fight over females. This species is also ovoviviparous and known to 'give birth' to up to 11 young at once.

== Etymology ==
Porthidium arcosae is named after Professor Doctor Laura Acros, rector of the Biology Department at Pontífica Universidad Católica del Ecuador for helping the authors with her authority and competence.
