= Porthidium lansbergii hutmanni =

Scientific classification
- Kingdom: Animalia
- Phylum: Chordata
- Class: Reptilia
- Order: Squamata
- Suborder: Serpentes
- Family: Viperidae
- Genus: Porthidium
- Species: P. lansbergii
- Subspecies: P. l. hutmanni

Trinomial name
- Porthidium lansbergii hutmanni Sandner-Montilla, 1989

Subspecies of snake endemic to Venezuela

Porthidium lansbergii hutmanni is a subspecies of Lansberg's hog-nosed pitvipers endemic to Isla Margarita, Venezuela. The subspecies is named after Adolf Houtmann, spelt all three of hutmanni, houtmanni and hautmanni in the original paper.

== Description ==
Porthidium lansbergii hutmanni is one of the smallest venomous snakes in the world. It is found in the semi-arid forests of Isla Margarita.

== Venom ==
The venom from Porthidium lansbergii hutmanni is known to cause bleeding, edema, blistering, necrosis and damage to the lymphatic system and extracellular matrix. However, it is treatable with antivenom.

== Reproduction ==
Like all subspecies of Porthidium lansbergii, P. l. hutmanni is ovoviviparous.
