= Porthidium lansbergii rozei =

Scientific classification
- Kingdom: Animalia
- Phylum: Chordata
- Class: Reptilia
- Order: Squamata
- Suborder: Serpentes
- Family: Viperidae
- Genus: Porthidium
- Species: P. lansbergii
- Subspecies: P. l. rozei

Trinomial name
- Porthidium lansbergii rozei Peters, 1968

Subspecies of snake endemic to Venezuela

Porthidium lansbergii rozei, is a relatively understudied subspecies of Lansberg's hog-nosed pitvipers endemic to Venezuela. As with all pit vipers, P. l. rozei is venomous. This subspecies was named after Janis Arnolds Roze.

== Description ==
Porthidium lansbergii rozei is distinguished from its sister subspecies via its various scale morphologies and its dark blotches.
