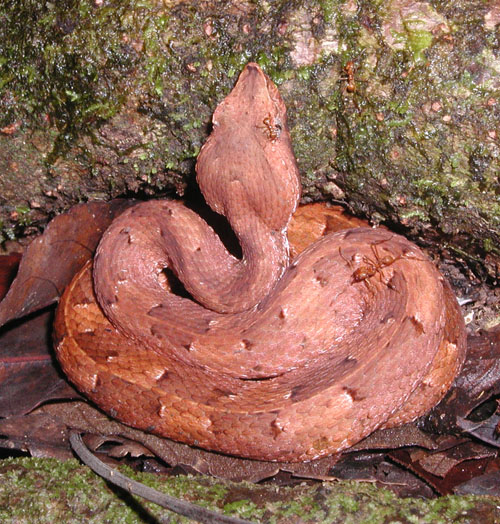

Scientific classification
- Kingdom: Animalia
- Phylum: Chordata
- Class: Reptilia
- Order: Squamata
- Suborder: Serpentes
- Family: Viperidae
- Genus: Porthidium
- Species: P. porrasi

Binomial name
- Porthidium porrasi Lamar, 2003

= Porthidium porrasi =

Species of snake endemic to Costa Rica

Porthidium porrasi is a species of hognose pit viper endemic to south-west Costa Rica. Like all pit vipers, P. porrasi is venomous.

== Description ==
Distinguished from similar species with its extremely upright nose and various scale morphologies, the white-tailed snub-nose viper is named commonly after another distinguishing characteristic, its white tail tip which is sometimes cream or yellow. It grows to a maximum of 50 cm. Its head is broad and distinct from its neck.

== Behaviour ==
Porthidium porrasi is a nocturnal/crepuscular, terrestrial snake. It prefers to stay camouflaged under leaf litter and its preferred habitat is rainforests, from sea level to 200 m of elevation.

== Reproduction ==
The white-tailed snub-nose viper is considered to be either ovoviviparous or viviparous.
