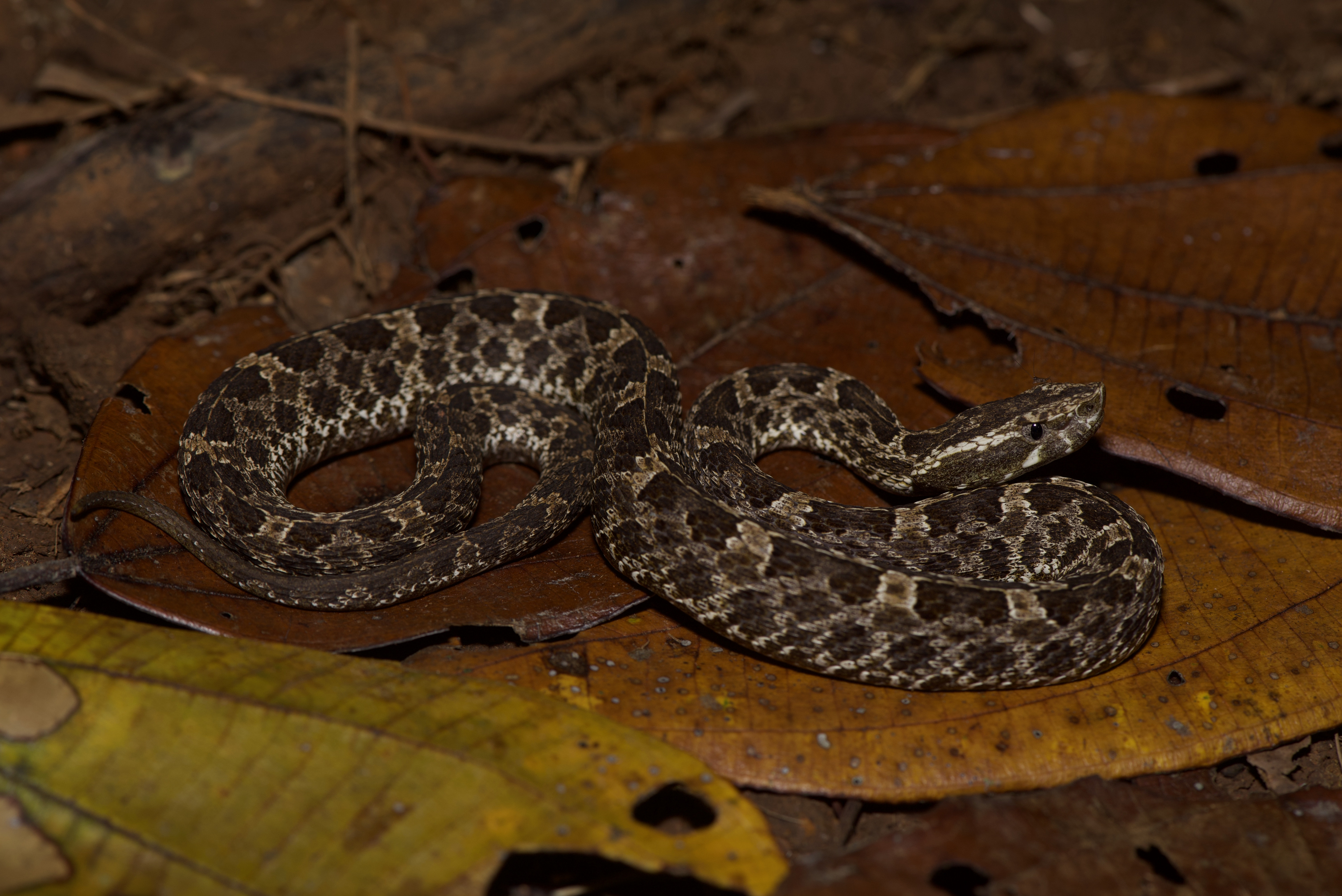
- Adult Porthidium volcanicum from Buenos Aires, Costa Rica. Photo by Steven Klioze.

Scientific classification
- Kingdom: Animalia
- Phylum: Chordata
- Class: Reptilia
- Order: Squamata
- Suborder: Serpentes
- Family: Viperidae
- Genus: Porthidium
- Species: P. volcanicum

Binomial name
- Porthidium volcanicum Solórzano, 1994

= Porthidium volcanicum =

Species of snake

Porthidium volcanicum, the Ujarran hognosed pit viper, is a pit viper species endemic to Costa Rica. No subspecies are currently recognized.

== Description ==
Adults of P. volcanicum are moderately stout, with females growing to 31–53.6 cm (12 1/4–21 1/8 in) in total length (including tail). The only male ever collected was 25.9 cm (10 1/4 in) long.

== Geographic range ==
Porthidium volcanicum is known only from the type locality, which is given as "Ujarrás de Buenos Aires (Valle del General, suroeste de la provincia de Puntarenas, Costa Rica)", Volcán de Buenos Aires and Valle del General in Puntarenas Province, Costa Rica.

== Habitat ==
Porthidium volcanicum occurs in tropical moist forest. The region receives 3,500 mm (140 in) of rainfall annually and has a dry season January–April.
