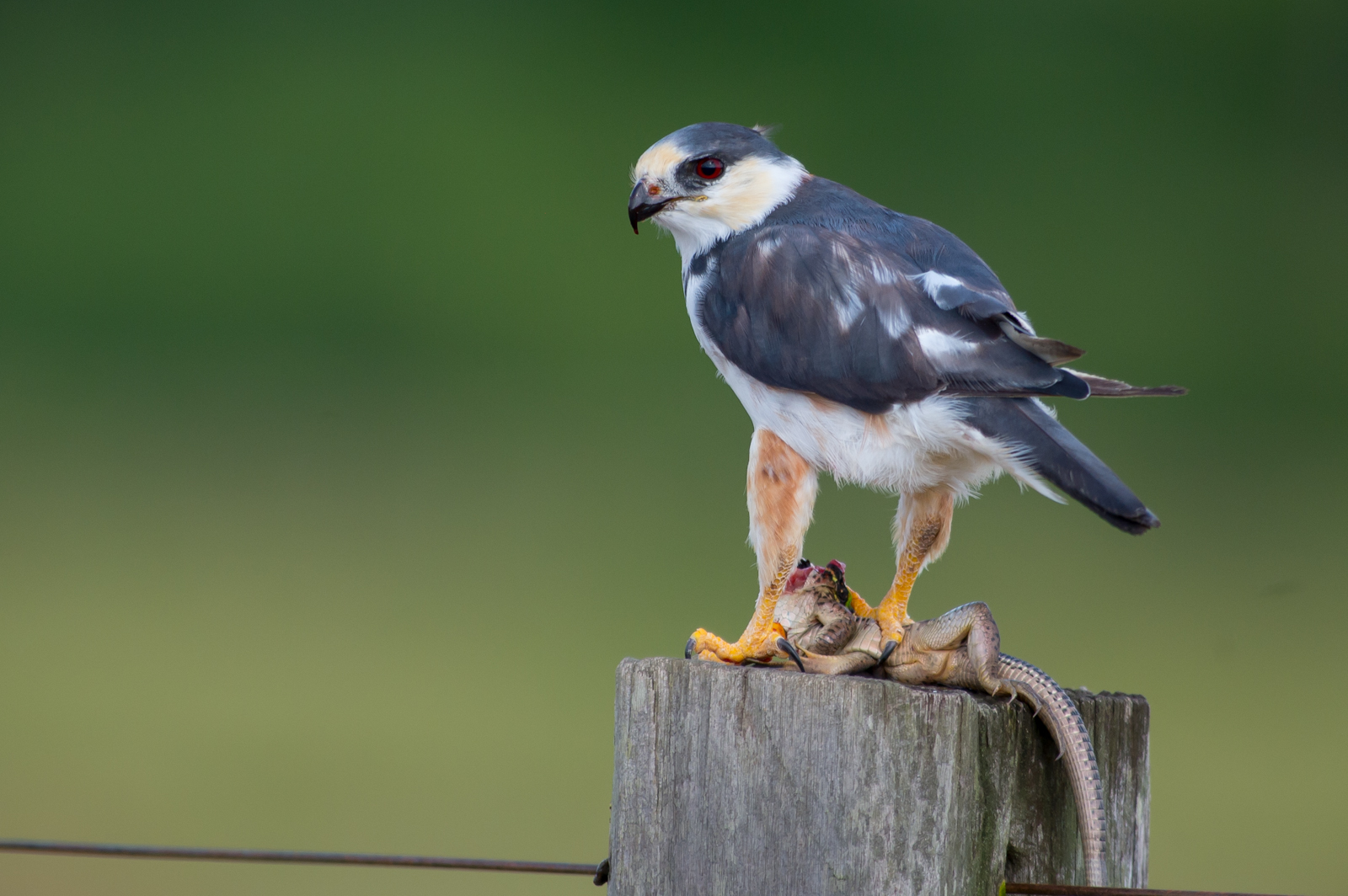
- Pearl Kite in savannah

Conservation status
- Least Concern (IUCN 3.1)

Scientific classification
- Kingdom: Animalia
- Phylum: Chordata
- Class: Aves
- Order: Accipitriformes
- Family: Accipitridae
- Genus: Gampsonyx; Vigors, 1825
- Species: G. swainsonii

Binomial name
- Gampsonyx swainsonii Vigors, 1825

Subspecies
- G. s. leonae - Chubb, C, 1918; G. s. magnus - Chubb, C, 1918; G. s. swainsonii - Vigors, 1825

= Pearl kite =

Species of bird

The pearl kite (Gampsonyx swainsonii) is a very small raptor found in open savanna habitat adjacent to deciduous woodland in Central and South America. It is the only member of the genus Gampsonyx. The scientific name commemorates the English naturalist William Swainson.

== Taxonomy and systematics ==
The type specimen was collected from Brazil by English naturalist William Swainson, and described by Nicholas Aylward Vigors in 1825. Vigors noted the similarity to both hawks and falcons, but placed Gampsonyx within the "Accipitrine subfamily" because it lacks the notched beak of the falcons. He also noted its striking resemblance to the coloration of the falconets.

Later, the pearl kite was classified with the falcons. For example, Peters placed it with the forest falcons in subfamily Polyhieracinae. In the mid-20th century it was found to be related to Elanus based on morphology and its molt schedule.

== Distribution and habitat ==
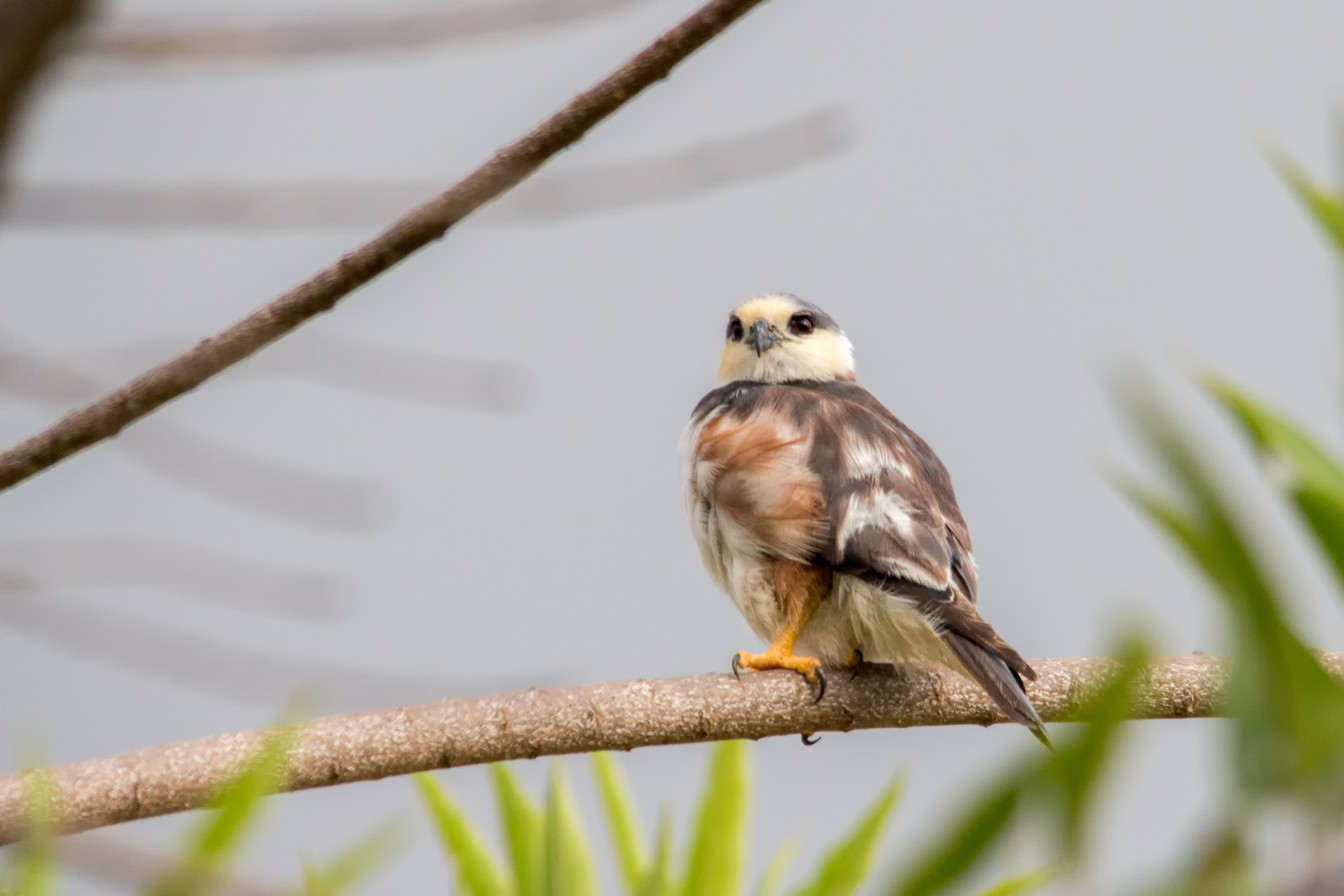
subspecies north of the Amazon river

This tiny kite breeds from Panama, Colombia and Venezuela south to Bolivia and northern Argentina, with an isolated sedentary population in Nicaragua. It is expanding its range and was proved to breed on Trinidad in 1970. It was first reported in Costa Rica in the mid-1990s, and now is fairly common along Pacific slope, to 1000m.

== Description ==
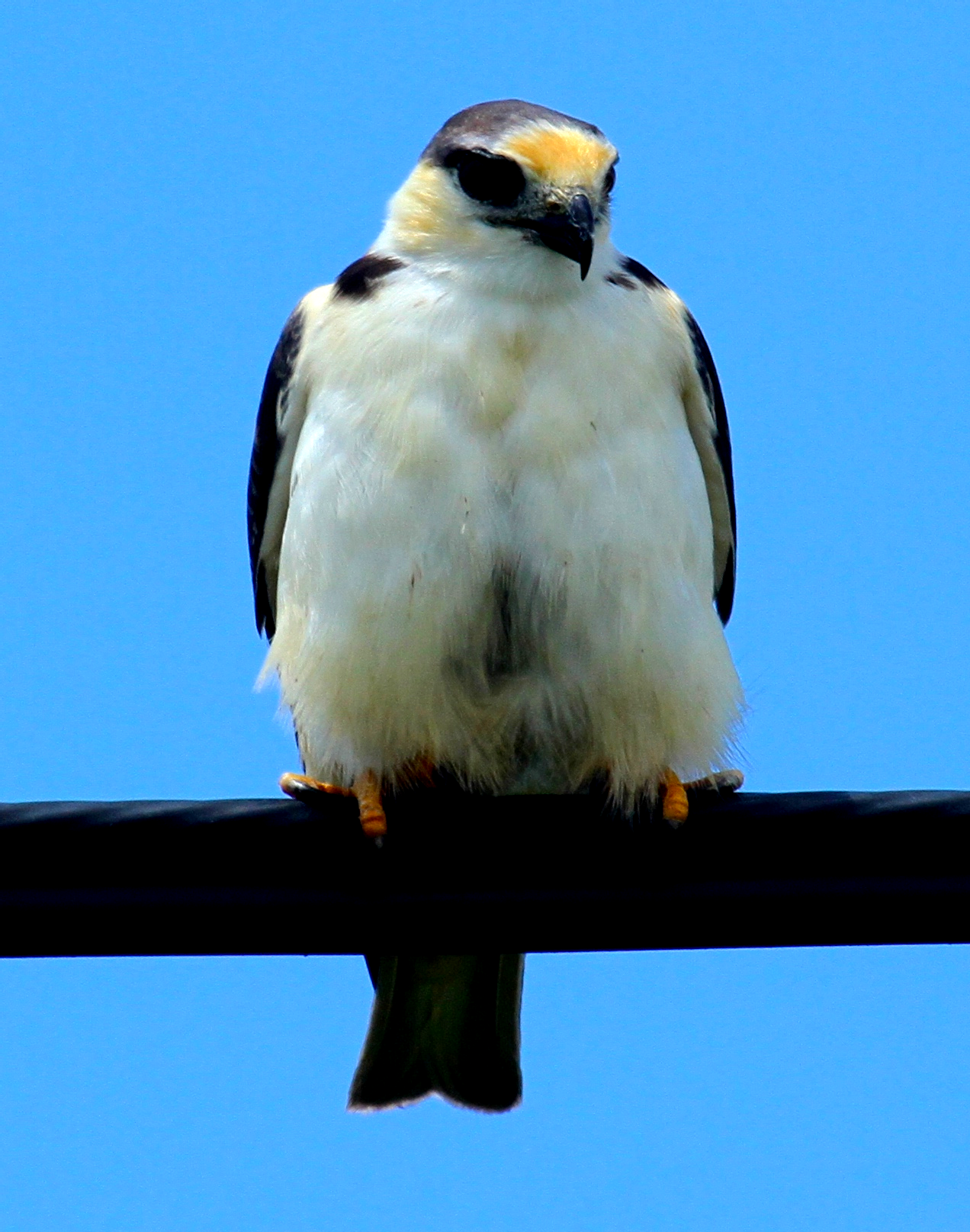
Frontal view showing yellow forehead. South of Guayaquil, Ecuador

The pearl kite is 20.3–23 cm (8.0–9.1 in) in length and weighs 80–95 g (2.8–3.4 oz). It is the smallest raptor in the Americas and one of the two smallest accipitrids in the world (besides the little sparrowhawk). The tiny hawk, another neotropical species, attains a slightly higher weight than the pearl kite. The adult has a black crown, upperparts, wing and tail, a rufous edged white collar, yellow forehead and cheeks, mainly white underparts, and yellow legs. Immature birds are similar to the adults but have white and chestnut tips to the back and wing feathers, a buff collar and some buff on the white underparts. In flight this species looks mainly black above and white below. The northern form G. s. leonae differs from the nominate G. s. swainsonii in that it has rufous flanks.

== Behaviour ==
=== Breeding ===
The nest is a deep cup of sticks built high in a tree. The clutch is 2-4 brown-marked white eggs, incubated mainly by the female for 34–35 days to hatching, with a further five weeks to fledging. There may be two broods in a season.

=== Feeding ===
The pearl kite feeds mainly on lizards, such as the Anolis and geckos. Its most common prey is the Microlophus occipitalis. It also takes small birds (such as ruddy ground doves), frogs and insects (such as cockroaches); it usually sits on a high open perch from which it swoops on its prey. The call is a high musical pip-pip-pip-pip or kitty-kitty-kitty.
