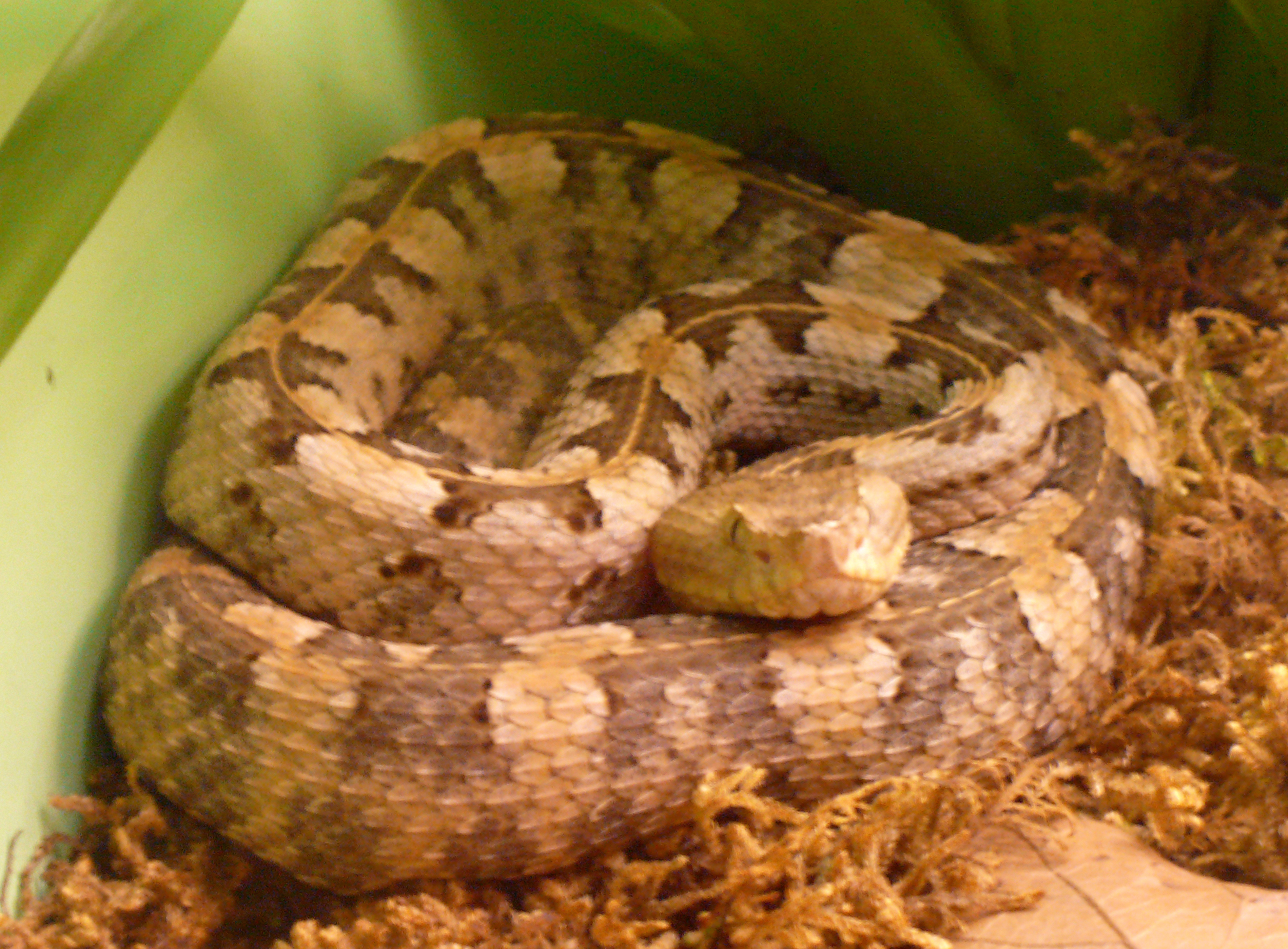

Conservation status
- Least Concern (IUCN 3.1)

Scientific classification
- Kingdom: Animalia
- Phylum: Chordata
- Class: Reptilia
- Order: Squamata
- Suborder: Serpentes
- Family: Viperidae
- Genus: Porthidium
- Species: P. dunni

Binomial name
- Porthidium dunni (Hartweg & Oliver, 1938)
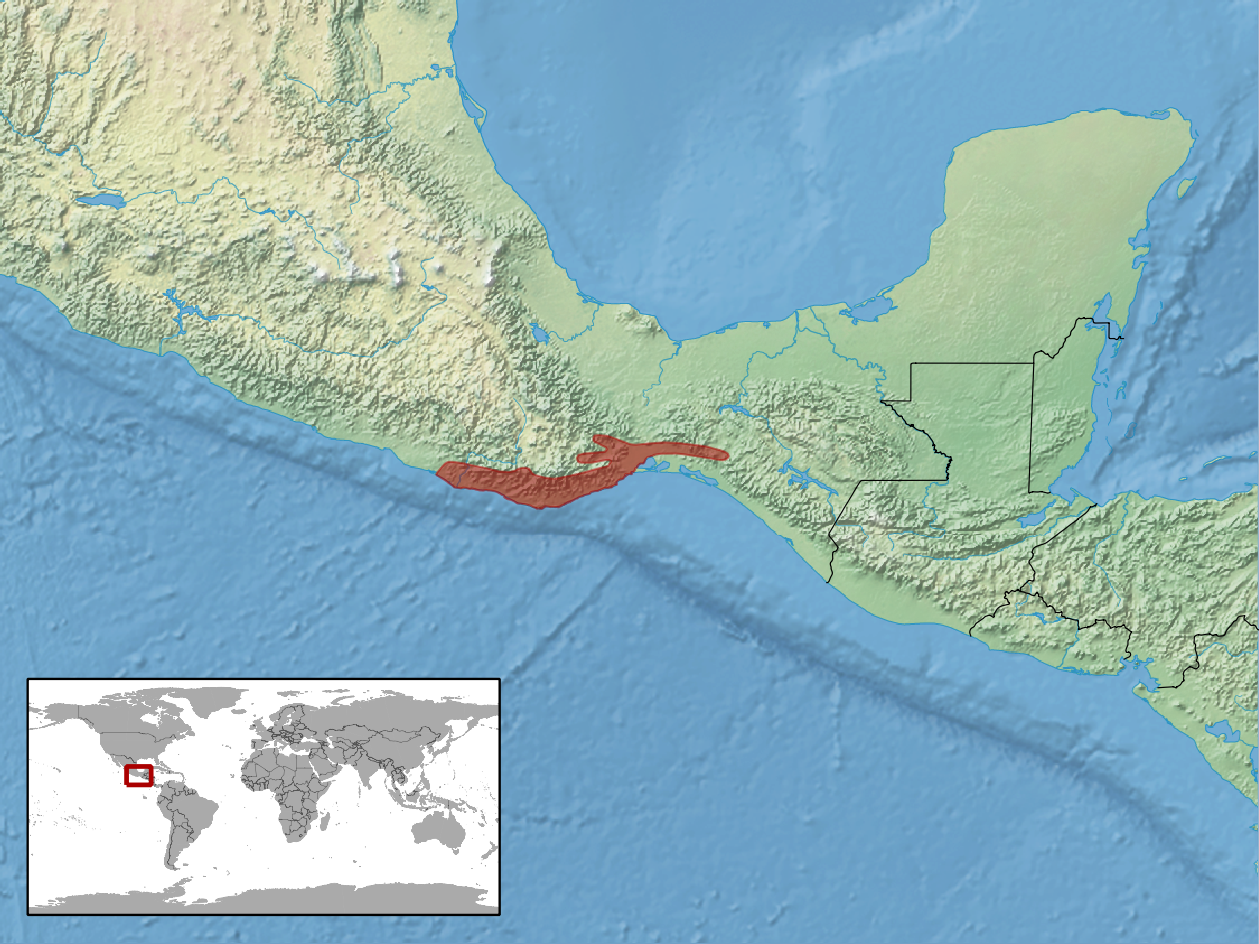

Synonyms
- Trimeresurus dunni Hartweg & Oliver, 1938; Bothrops dunni — H.M. Smith & Taylor, 1945; Porthidium dunni — Campbell & Lamar, 1989

= Porthidium dunni =

Species of snake

Common names: Dunn's hognosed pit viper.

Porthidium dunni is a species of pit viper in the family Viperidae. The species is endemic to Mexico. There are no recognized subspecies.

== Etymology ==
The specific name, dunni, is in honor of American herpetologist Emmett Reid Dunn "in appreciation of his work on American snake fauna".

== Description ==
Adults of P. dunni are usually 30–40 cm (11 3/4–15 3/4 in) in total length (including tail), with a maximum of 57 cm (22 1/2 in). A moderately stout and terrestrial species, the tip of the snout is moderately elevated.

== Geographic range ==
P. dunni is found in southern Mexico in the Pacific lowlands of Oaxaca and western Chiapas.

The type locality given is "the immediate vicinity of the village of Tehuantepec" [Oaxaca, Mexico].

== Habitat ==
The preferred natural habitat of P. dunni is forest.

== Reproduction ==
P. dunni is ovoviviparous.

== Conservation status ==
At Riverbanks Zoo

The species P. dunni is classified as Least Concern (LC) on the IUCN Red List of Threatened Species (v3.1, 2007). Species are listed as such due to their wide distribution, presumed large population, or because it is unlikely to be declining fast enough to qualify for listing in a more threatened category. The population trend is stable. Year assessed: 2007.
