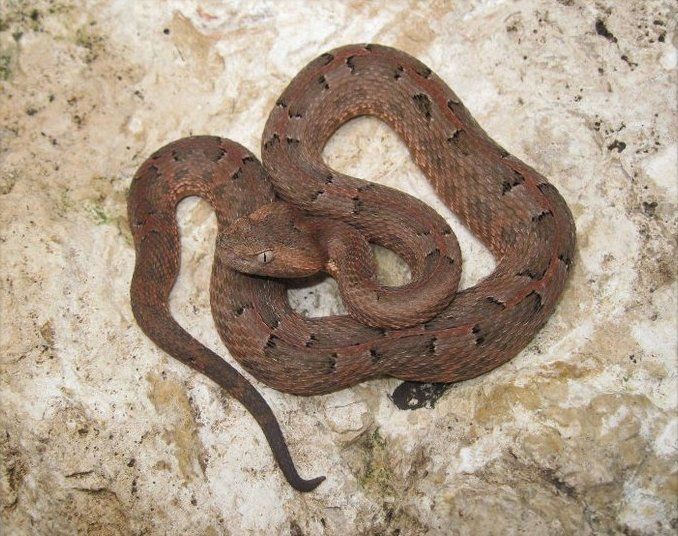

Conservation status
- Least Concern (IUCN 3.1)

Scientific classification
- Kingdom: Animalia
- Phylum: Chordata
- Class: Reptilia
- Order: Squamata
- Suborder: Serpentes
- Family: Viperidae
- Genus: Porthidium
- Species: P. yucatanicum

Binomial name
- Porthidium yucatanicum (H.M. Smith, 1941)
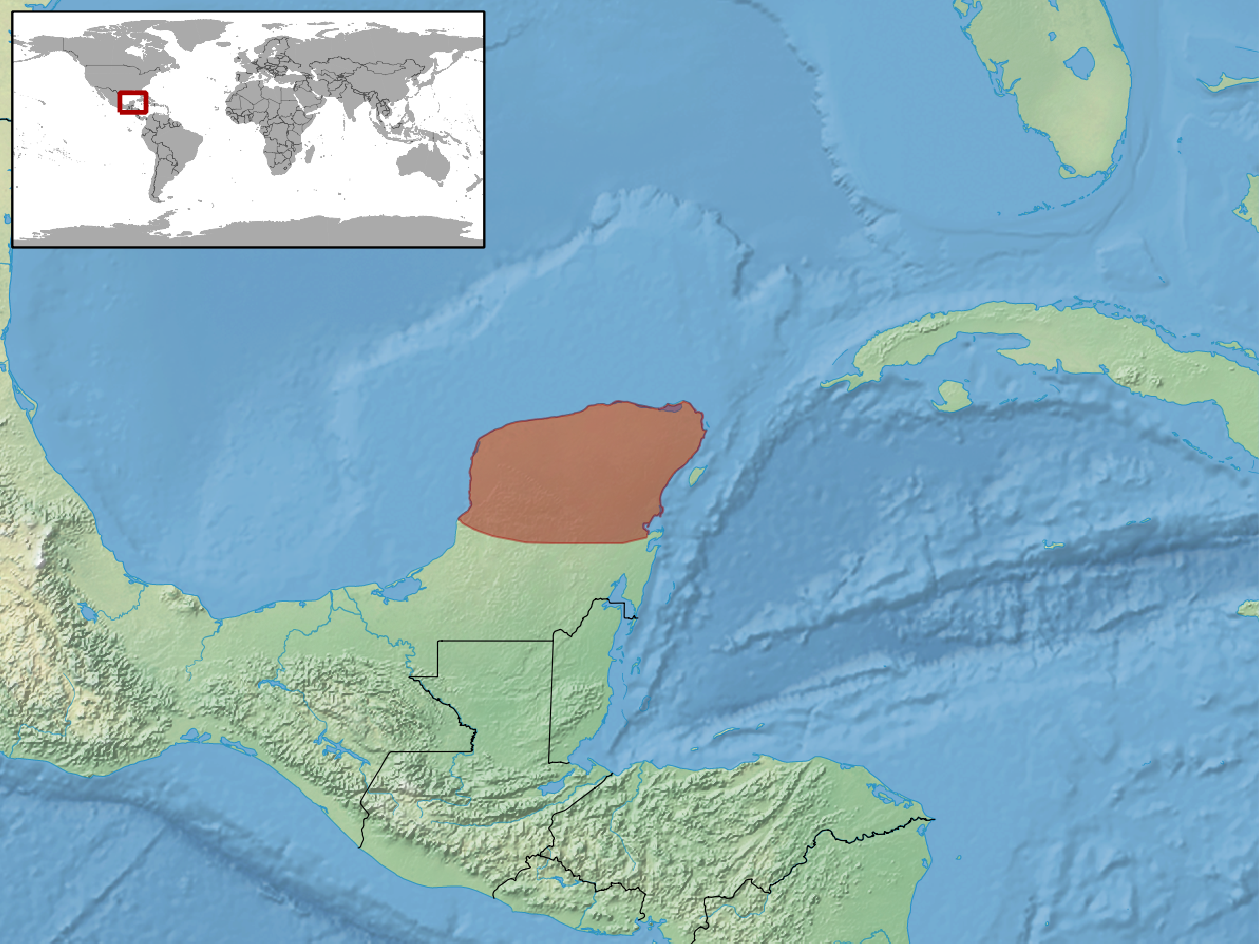

Synonyms
- Trimeresurus yucatanicus H.M. Smith, 1941; Bothrops yucatanicus – H.M. Smith & Taylor, 1945; Bothrops yucatannicus – Hoge & Romano-Hoge, 1981; Trimeresurus yucatannicus – Hoge & Romano-Hoge, 1981; Porthidium yucatanicum – Campbell & Lamar, 1989

= Porthidium yucatanicum =

Species of snake

Common names: Yucatán hognosed pit viper.

Porthidium yucatanicum is a pit viper species found in Mexico. No subspecies are currently recognized.

== Description ==
Adults are usually 35–45 cm (13 3/4–17 3/4 in) in total length, although some specimens may exceed 55 cm (21 3/4 in). The females tend to be larger than the males. Moderately stout and terrestrial.

== Geographic range ==
Found in the northern half of the Yucatán Peninsula in Mexico. The type locality given is "Chichen Itza, Yucatán" [Mexico].

== Conservation status ==
This species is classified as Least Concern (LC) on the IUCN Red List of Threatened Species (v3.1, 2001). Species are listed as such due to their wide distribution, presumed large population, or because it is unlikely to be declining fast enough to qualify for listing in a more threatened category. The population trend is unknown. Year assessed: 2007.
