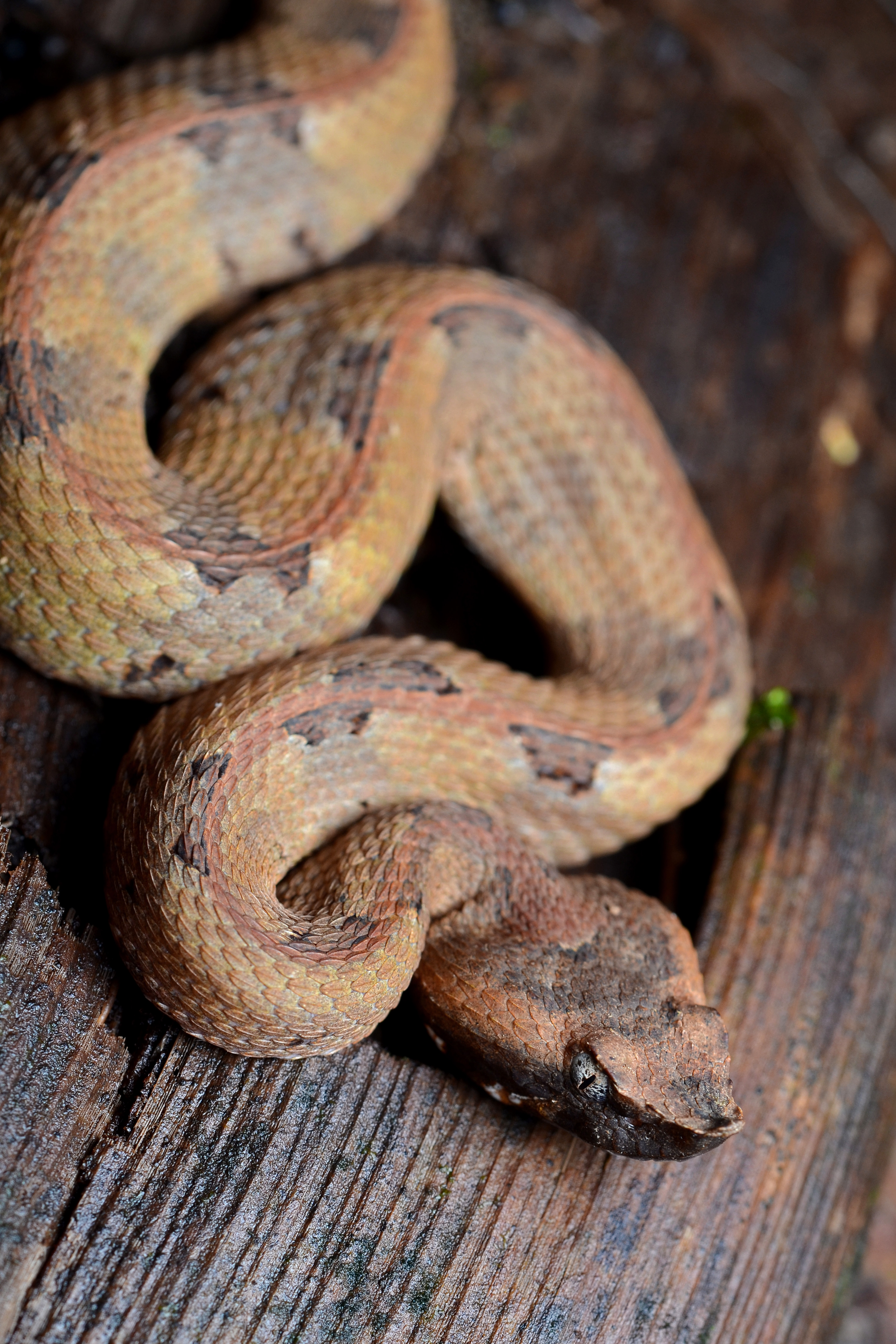
- Specimen at La Selva Biological Station, Costa Rica

Conservation status
- Least Concern (IUCN 3.1)

Scientific classification
- Kingdom: Animalia
- Phylum: Chordata
- Class: Reptilia
- Order: Squamata
- Suborder: Serpentes
- Family: Viperidae
- Genus: Porthidium
- Species: P. nasutum

Binomial name
- Porthidium nasutum (Bocourt, 1868)
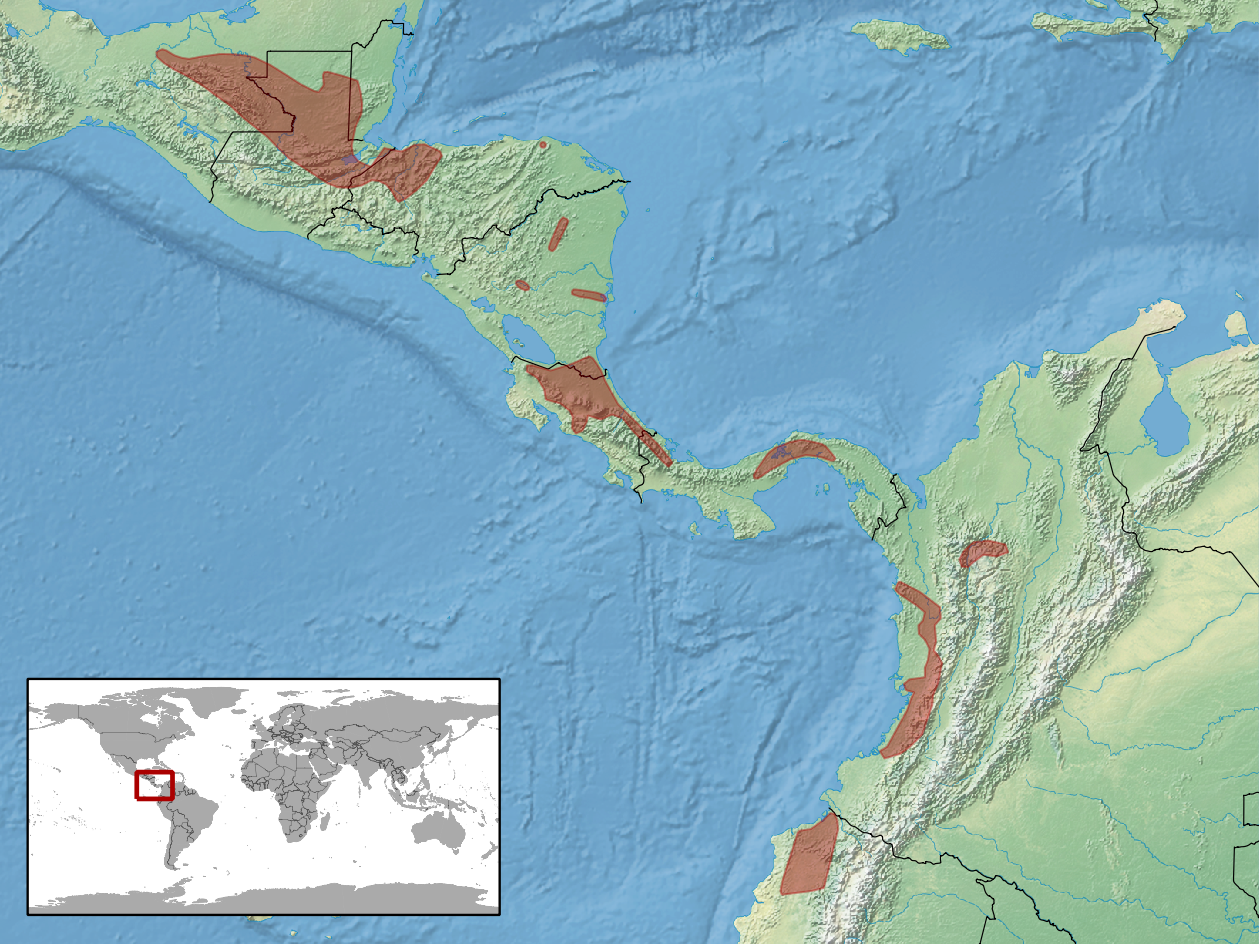

Synonyms
- Bothrops nasutus Bocourt, 1868; Porthidium nasutum — Cope, 1871; Bothriopsis proboscideus Cope, 1875; Th[anatos]. sutus Posada-Arango, 1889; Th[anatophis]. sutus — Posada-Arango, 1889; Lachesis brachystoma Boulenger, 1896; Bothrops nasuta — Amaral, 1929; Trimeresurus nasutus — Dunn & Bailey, 1939; Bothrops nasutus — J.A. Peters & Orejas-Miranda, 1970; Bothriechis nasutus — Savage, 1980; Porthidium nasutum — H.M. Smith & R.B. Smith, 1976

= Porthidium nasutum =

Species of snake

Common names: hognosed pit viper, hognosed pit viper, rainforest hognosed pit viper, horned hog-nosed viper.

Porthidium nasutum is a pit viper species native to southern Mexico, Central America and northern South America. No subspecies are recognized as being valid.

== Description ==
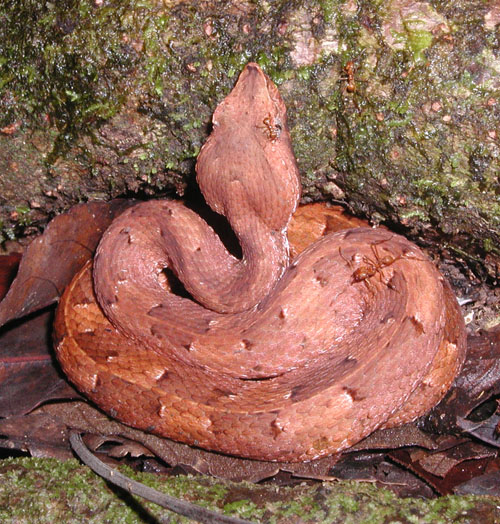
P. nasutum at Corcovado National Park in Costa Rica

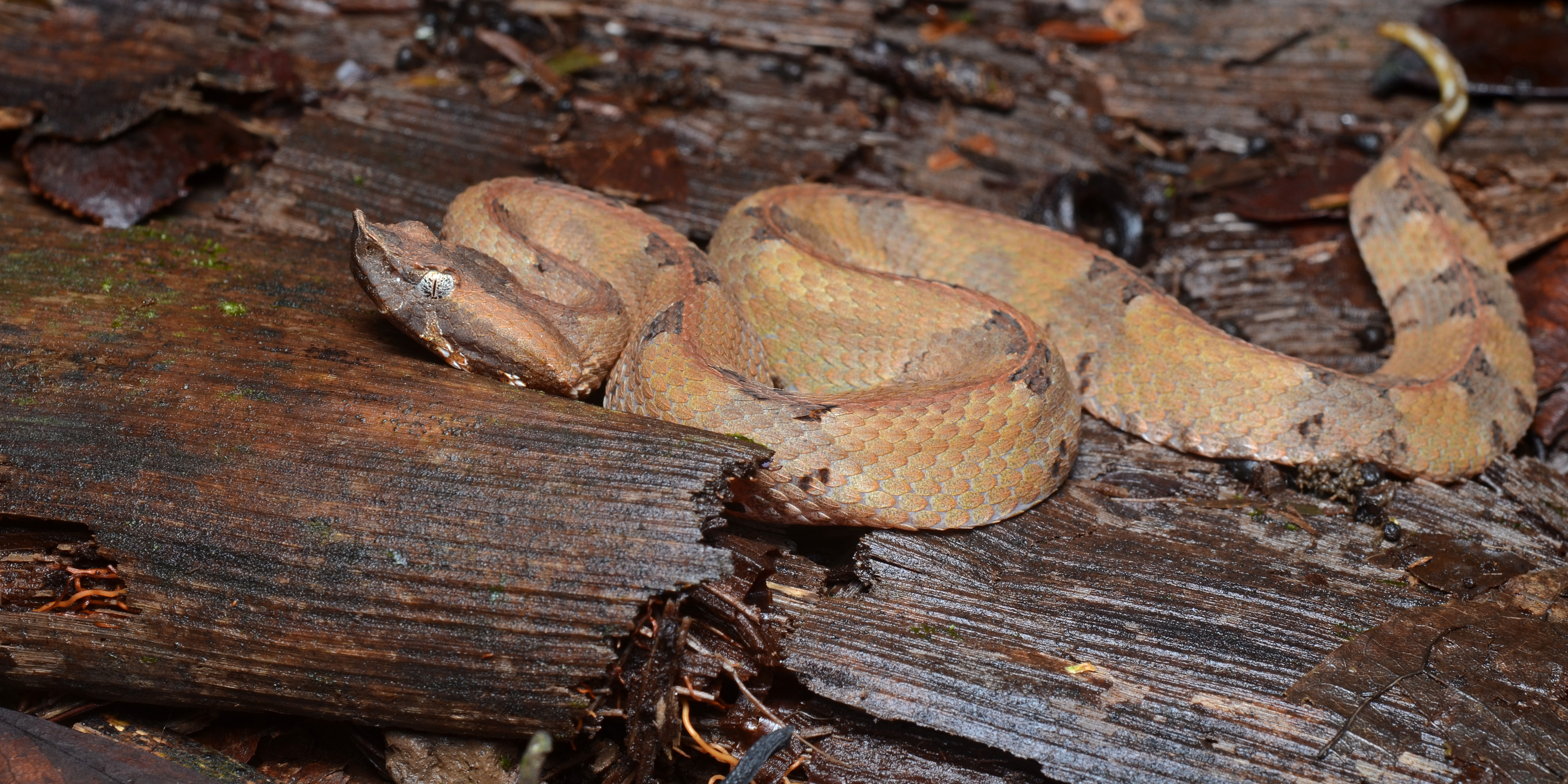
P. nasutum at the La Selva Biological Station in Costa Rica

Adults of Porthidium nasutum are usually less than 40 centimetres (16 in) in total length (tail included), and rarely more than 60 centimetres (24 in). Females are considerably larger than males. Both sexes are moderately stout.

== Geographic distribution ==
Porthidium nasutum is found in southern Mexico southward through Central America to western Colombia and northwestern Ecuador in South America. Inhabits the Atlantic lowlands from Mexico (Tabasco and Chiapas) through Belize, Guatemala, Honduras, Nicaragua and Costa Rica to eastern Panama and northwestern Colombia. In the Pacific lowlands, it occurs in southwestern Costa Rica, central and eastern Panama, continuing on to northwestern Ecuador. The type locality given is "Pansos [Panzós], sur les bords du Polochic [Alta Verapaz] (Guatémala)".

== Habitat ==
The preferred natural habitat of Porthidium nasutum is mesic lowland broadleaf or rainforest from sea level to elevations of about 900 m (3,000 ft).

== Behavior ==
Porthidium nasutum is terrestrial.

== Reproduction ==
Porthidium nasutum is ovoviviparous.

== Conservation status ==
The species Porthidium nasutum is classified as Least Concern (LC) on the IUCN Red List of Threatened Species. It is a widespread and moderately common species that is not facing major threats.
