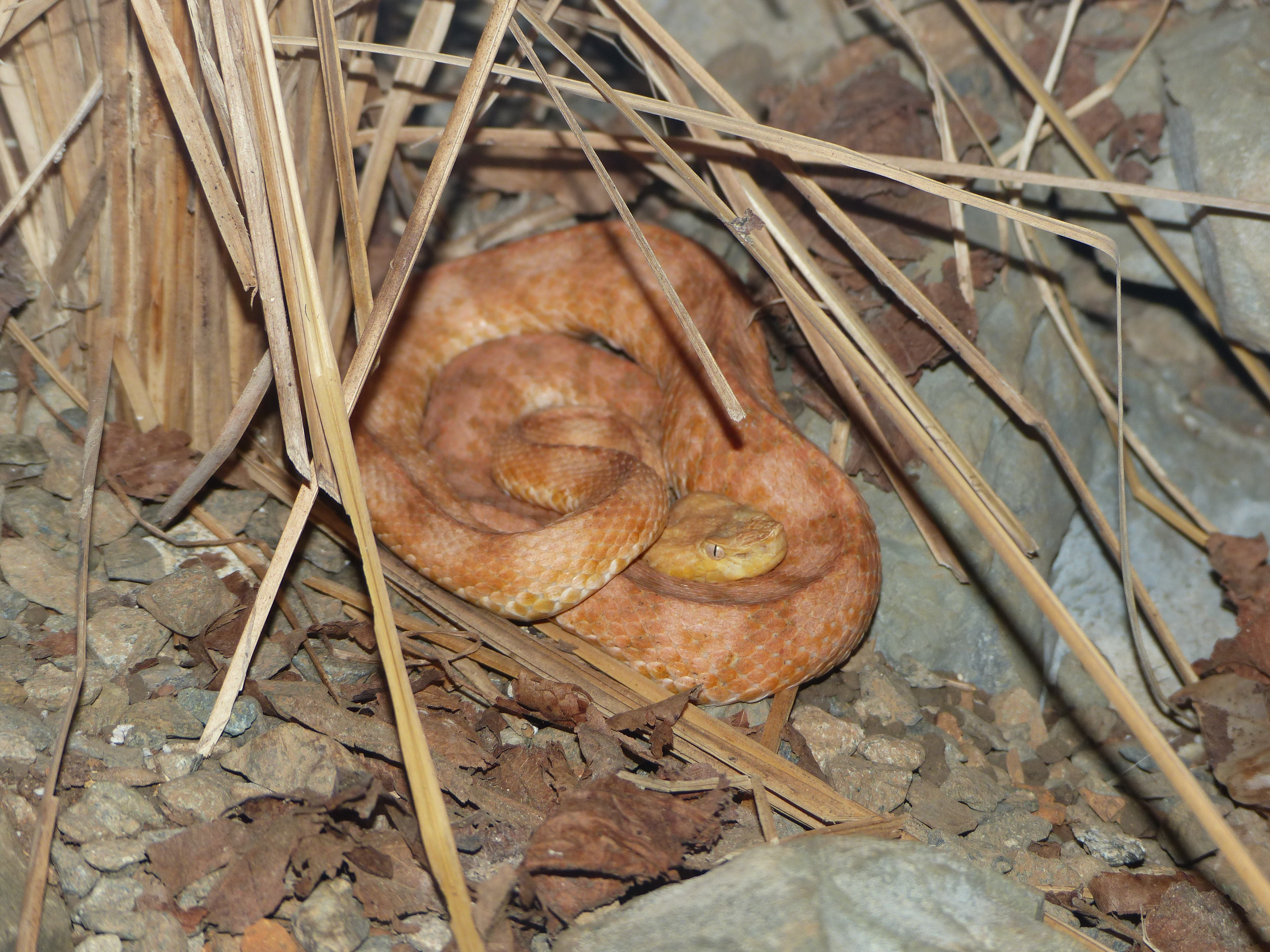

Conservation status
- Least Concern (IUCN 3.1)

Scientific classification
- Kingdom: Animalia
- Phylum: Chordata
- Class: Reptilia
- Order: Squamata
- Suborder: Serpentes
- Family: Viperidae
- Genus: Porthidium
- Species: P. lansbergii

Binomial name
- Porthidium lansbergii (Schlegel, 1841)

Synonyms
- Trigonocephalus lansbergii Schlegel, 1841; T [eleuraspis]. Castelnaui Var. brachystoma Cope, 1860; T [eleuraspis]. Lansbergi — Cope, 1860; Bothriechis brachystoma — Cope, 1860; Bothrops lansbergii — Günther, 1863; B[othrops]. Boussingaultii Jan, 1863; B[othrops]. Lansbergi — Jan, 1863; Porthidium lansbergii — Cope, 1871; Bothriopsis brachystoma — Cope, 1871; B[othriopsis]. castelnavi var. brachystoma — Cope, 1871; Bothrops brachystoma — F. Müller, 1880; Bothriopsis br [achystoma]. — F. Müller, 1880; Brothriopsis brachystoma — Cope, 1887; Teleuraspis castelnaudi var. brachystoma — Cope, 1887; Th[anatos]. Lansbergii — Posada Arango, 1889; Th[anatophis]. Lansbergi — Posada Arango, 1889; Th[anatos]. Boussingaultii — Posada Arango, 1889; Th[anatophis]. Boussingaultii — Posada Arango, 1889; Bothriechis lansbergii — Günther, 1895; Lachesis lansbergii — Boulenger, 1896; Lachesis brachystoma — Boulenger, 1896; Trimeresurus brachystoma — Mocquard, 1989; Bothriechis lansbergii — Recinos, 1913; Lachesis lansbergi — Griffin, 1916; Bothrops lansbergii venezuelensis Roze, 1959; B[othrops]. l [ansbergii]. lansbergii — Roze, 1959; Porthidium lansbergii — Campbell & Lamar, 1989; Porthidium lansbergii lansbergii — Campbell & Lamar, 1989

= Porthidium lansbergii =

Species of snake

Common names: Lansberg's hognosed pit viper.

Porthidium lansbergii is a species of venomous snake, a pit viper in the family Viperidae. The species is native to eastern Central America and northwestern South America. Three subspecies are recognized, including the nominate subspecies described here.

== Etymology ==
The specific name, lansbergii, is in honor of "M[onsieur]. de Lansberge" (Reinhart Frans von Lansberge), Dutch consul at Caracas, Venezuela, in 1841.

== Description ==
Adults of P. lansbergii average 30–50 cm (11 3/4–19 5/8 in) in total length (including tail), with a maximum of 90 cm (35 1/2 in). A terrestrial snake, it is moderately slender.

== Common names ==
Common names for P. lansbergii include Lansberge's hog-nosed pit-viper. It is also called patoca in Colombia and Panama.

== Geographic range ==
P. lansbergii is found in extreme eastern Central America in the xeric coastal lowlands of central and eastern Panama, in northern South America in the Atlantic lowlands of Colombia and northern Venezuela, as well as in the Pacific lowlands of Ecuador. The type locality given is "les environs de Turbaco [Department de Bolívar], en Colombie ". According to Amaral (1929), the holotype is likely from Tumaco.

According to the range map provided by Campbell & Lamar (2004), the subspecies P. l. rozei and P. l. lansbergii intergrade in the northern part of the Guajira Peninsula.

== Habitat ==
The preferred natural habitat of P. lansbergii is forest, from sea level to 1,270 m (4,170 ft).

== Subspecies ==
Subspecies	Taxon author	Common name	Geographic range
P. l. hutmanni	(Sandner-Montilla, 1989)		Endemic to Isla Margarita, Venezuela.
P. l. lansbergii	(Schlegel, 1841)		Northern Colombia and Panama.
P. l. rozei	(J. Peters, 1968)	Lansberg's gold hognosed pitviper	Venezuela from the Lake Maracaibo region and along the coast as far east as Caripito Monagas. Also enters northeastern Colombia to the southwest of Lake Maracaibo.

Nota bene: A trinomial authority (taxon author) in parentheses indicates that the subspecies was originally described in a genus other than Porthidium.

== Taxonomy ==
Campbell & Lamar (2004) elevated P. arcosae (originally P. l. arcosae) to full species.

== Reproduction ==
P. lansbergii is viviparous.
