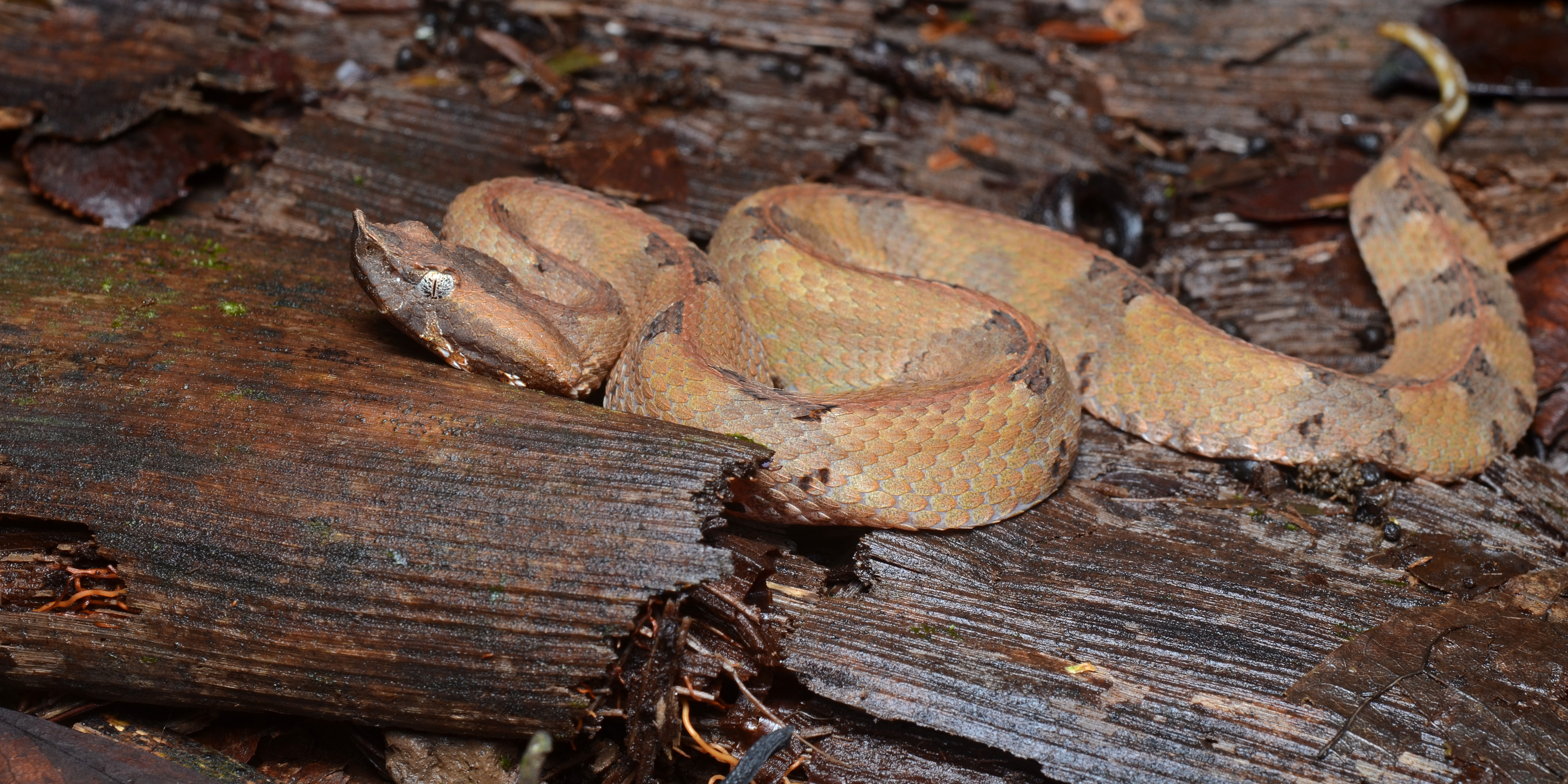
- Porthidium nasutum, rainforest hognose pitviper

Scientific classification
- Kingdom: Animalia
- Phylum: Chordata
- Class: Reptilia
- Order: Squamata
- Suborder: Serpentes
- Family: Viperidae
- Subfamily: Crotalinae
- Genus: Porthidium; Cope, 1871

= Porthidium =

Genus of snakes

Common names: hognose pit vipers

Porthidium is a genus of pit vipers found in Mexico and southward to northern South America. The name is derived from the Greek word portheo and the suffix -idus, which mean "destroy" and "having the nature of", apparently a reference to the venom. As of January 2026 nine species are recognized as being valid. The snakes of the genus Hypnale in southern India and Sri Lanka look quite similar to those of this genus, possibly an example of convergent evolution.

== Description ==
Porthidium is a genus of small species, adults ranging in total length (including tail) from 55 cm (22 in) (P. dunni and P. yucatanicum) to 75 cm (30 in) (P. lansbergii and P. ophryomegas). In addition, the body shape ranges from relatively slender (P. ophryomegas) to relatively stout (P. nasutum). All have a sharply defined canthus rostralis and a rostral scale that is higher than it is broad. The tip of the snout may be slightly to moderately elevated (P. hespere, P. lansbergii, P. ophryomegas and P. volcanicum), strongly elevated (P. dunni and P. yucatanicum), or not elevated at all. All species have a color pattern that usually consists of a brown or gray ground color, overlaid with a series of dark paraventral blotches that are separated by a pale and narrow vertebral stripe. The blotches are square, rectangular, or triangular in shape. In some species, the color pattern is determined by the sex.

== Geographic range ==
Found in Mexico (Colima, Oaxaca and Chiapas on the Pacific side, the Yucatán Peninsula on the Atlantic side) southward through Central America to northern South America (Ecuador in the Pacific lowlands, northern Venezuela in the Atlantic lowlands).

== Species ==
Species	Taxon author	Subsp.*	Common name	Geographic range
P. arcosae	Schätti & Kramer, 1993	0	Manabi hognose pit viper	Coast of Ecuador
P. dunni	(Hartweg & Oliver, 1938)	0	Dunn's hognose pit viper	Southern Mexico in the Pacific lowlands of Oaxaca and western Chiapas.
P. hespere	(Campbell, 1976)	0	Colima hognose pit viper	Western Mexico (Colima).
P. lansbergii	(Schlegel, 1841)	2	Lansberg's hognose pit viper	Extreme eastern Central America in the xeric coastal lowlands of central and eastern Panama. In northern South America in the Atlantic lowlands of Colombia and northern Venezuela, as well as the Pacific lowlands of Ecuador.
P. nasutum^{T}	(Bocourt, 1868)	0	rainforest hognose pit viper	Southern Mexico southward through Central America to western Colombia and northwestern Ecuador in South America. Inhabits the Atlantic lowlands from Mexico (Tabasco and Chiapas) through Belize, Guatemala, Honduras, Nicaragua and Costa Rica to eastern Panama and northwestern Colombia. In the Pacific lowlands, it occurs in southwestern Costa Rica, central and eastern Panama, continuing on to northwestern Ecuador. It is found in mesic lowland broadleaf or rainforest from sea level to elevation of about 900 m.
P. ophryomegas	(Bocourt, 1868)	0	slender hognose pit viper	Central America in Guatemala, El Salvador, Honduras, Nicaragua and Costa Rica.
P. porrasi	Lamar, 2003	0	Weißschwanz-Stülpnasenotter	Southwestern Costa Rica
P. volcanicum	Solórzano, 1994	0	Ujarran hognose pit viper	Volcán de Buenos Aires and Valle del General in Puntarenas Province, Costa Rica.
P. yucatanicum	(H.M. Smith, 1941)	0	Yucatán hognose pit viper	Northern half of the Yucatán Peninsula in Mexico.

*) Not including the nominate subspecies.
^{T}) Type species.

Nota bene: A binomial authority in parentheses indicates that the species was originally described in a genus other than Porthidium.
