= Langaha pseudoalluaudi =

Scientific classification
- Kingdom: Animalia
- Phylum: Chordata
- Class: Reptilia
- Order: Squamata
- Suborder: Serpentes
- Family: Pseudoxyrhophiidae
- Genus: Langaha
- Species: L. pseudoalluaudi

Binomial name
- Langaha pseudoalluaudi Domergue, 1988

Species of reptile

Langaha pseudoalluaudi, also known as the Ambilobe leaf-nosed snake, is one of three species within the genus Langaha. The Ambilobe leaf-nosed snake is the least common and least understood within the genus. They are known for having a leaf-like nasal protrusion and being extremely cryptic.

== Description ==
Langaha pseudoalluaudi is a non-venomous, relatively large, arboreal snake with a unique nasal appendage protruding from their nose. They are a grey/brown/tan color with lighter colored banding along the whole body. From one account, the total length for a female was 1260mm (4.13 ft) and the total length for a male was 1275mm (4.18 ft).

The unique nasal appendage acts as camouflage and causes the snakes' head to look like a twig or rotten stump when viewed from the front. The supraocular scales are enlarged and horn-like, adding to the complexity of their camouflage. Prey items are likely not able to distinguish L. pseudoalluaudi from twigs when they are approached by the snake.

Ambilobe leaf-nosed Snakes exhibit sexual dimorphism between males and females, particularly on the nasal protrusion. Females have a broader and flatter protrusion that is leaf-like in shape while males have a pointed spear-like protrusion.

== Distribution and habitat ==
Langaha pseudoalluaudi is regionally endemic to northwestern Madagascar, near the Ambilobe region. Due to few encounters, the extent of the range is not well understood.

Ambilobe leaf-nosed snakes have been observed in and around dry deciduous forests and rainforests. Specimens that have been found were on shrubby plants approximately 2–3 meters off the ground on the edge of forests, or crossing a path. Scientists noted that the habitats were relatively open and at an altitude between 80–250 meters.

== Diet ==
There are no observations about what what L. pseudoalluaudi predates upon. However, a closely related snake species, Langaha madagascariensis, has been observed eating lizards and small mice. It is hypothesized that L. pseudoalluadi would have a similar diet.

== Reproduction ==
Consistent with its genus, L. pseudoalluaudi is oviparous. The only observation about reproductive output showed that a female had a clutch size of three eggs.
