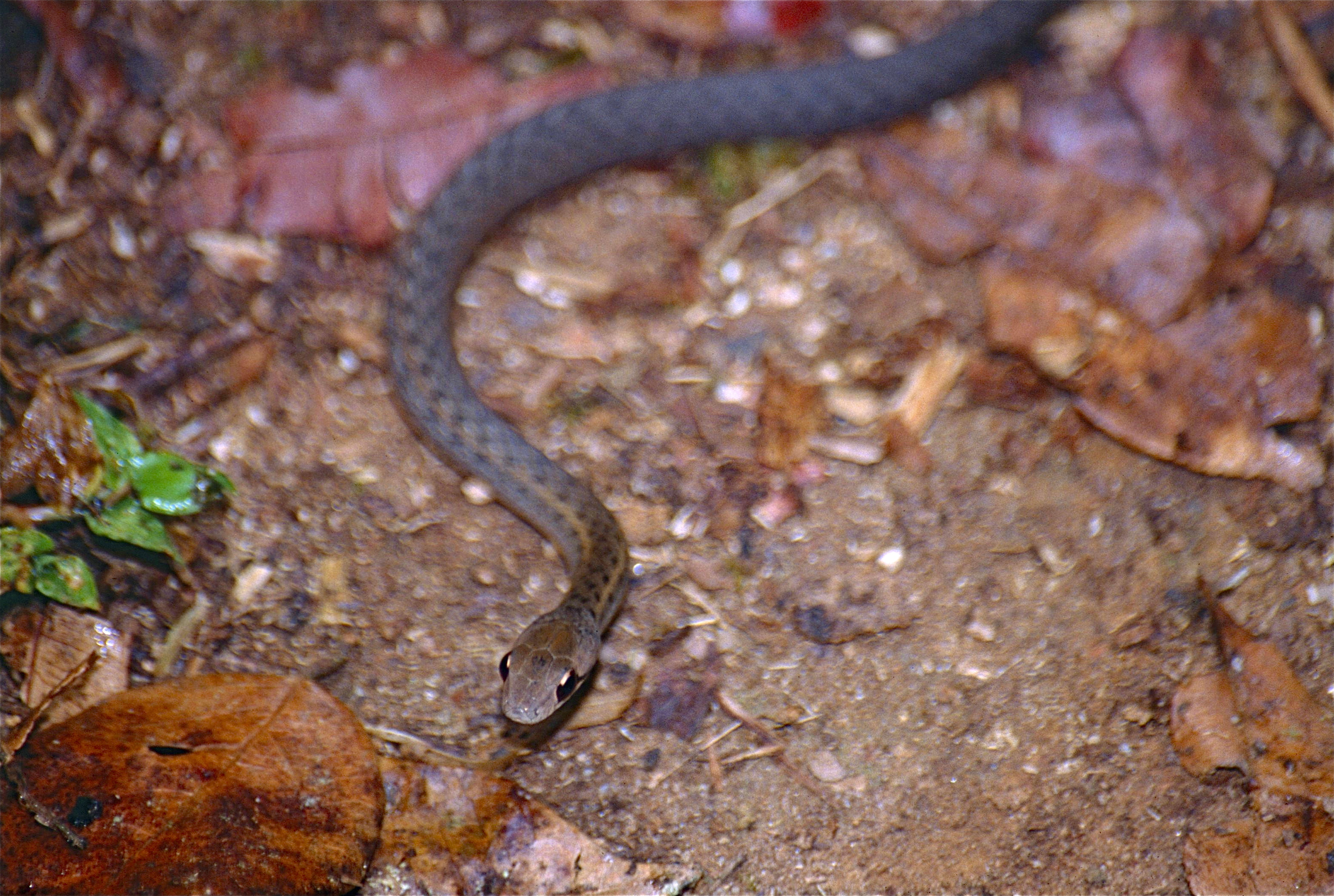

Conservation status
- Least Concern (IUCN 3.1)

Scientific classification
- Kingdom: Animalia
- Phylum: Chordata
- Class: Reptilia
- Order: Squamata
- Suborder: Serpentes
- Family: Pseudoxyrhophiidae
- Genus: Thamnosophis
- Species: T. infrasignatus

Binomial name
- Thamnosophis infrasignatus (Günther, 1882)

Synonyms
- Ptyas infrasignatus Günther, 1882; Liopholidophis thieli Domergue, 1972; Liopholidophis infrasignatus (Günther, 1882)

= Thamnosophis infrasignatus =

Species of snake

Thamnosophis infrasignatus, commonly known as the forest water snake, is a species of snake in the family Pseudoxyrhophiidae. It is endemic to Madagascar.
