= Ithycyphus goudoti =

Conservation status
- Least Concern (IUCN 3.1)

Scientific classification
- Kingdom: Animalia
- Phylum: Chordata
- Class: Reptilia
- Order: Squamata
- Suborder: Serpentes
- Family: Pseudoxyrhophiidae
- Genus: Ithycyphus
- Species: I. goudoti

Binomial name
- Ithycyphus goudoti (Schlegel, 1837)

Synonyms
- Herpetodryas goudotii Schlegel, 1837; Dryophylax goudotii (Schlegel, 1837); Philodryas goudotii (Schlegel, 1837); Ithycyphus caudolineatus Günther, 1873; Stenophis longicaudus Boettger, 1896

Species of snake

Ithycyphus goudoti is a species of snake in the family Pseudoxyrhophiidae. The species is endemic to Madagascar. It is venomous to other animals, but harmless to humans due to the weak nature of the venom.

== Etymology ==
The specific name, goudoti, is in honor of French entomologist Jules Prosper Goudot.

== Description ==
Ithycyphus goudoti is slender, with a flattened head, and generally with distinct color patterns in gray, yellow, or uniform red with some small darker spots. It is sexually dimorphic.

== Geographic distribution ==
Ithycyphus goudoti is found in several regions of Madagascar.

== Habitat ==
Ithycyphus goudoti can survive in a variety of habitats including rainforest, dry deciduous forest, and spiny thickets.

== Reproduction ==
Ithycyphus goudoti is oviparous.
