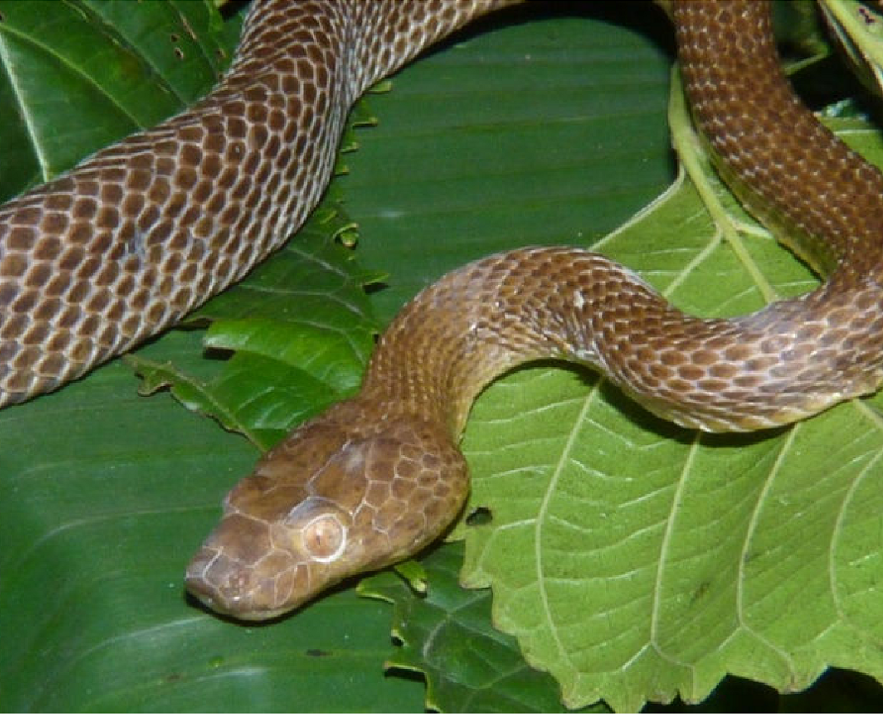
- Lycodryas maculatus

Scientific classification
- Kingdom: Animalia
- Phylum: Chordata
- Class: Reptilia
- Order: Squamata
- Suborder: Serpentes
- Family: Pseudoxyrhophiidae
- Subfamily: Pseudoxyrhophiinae
- Genus: Lycodryas; Günther, 1879

Type species
- Lycodryas sanctijohannis Günther, 1879

Species
- 9 recognized species, see text

Synonyms
- Stenophis Boulenger, 1896

= Lycodryas =

Genus of snakes

Lycodryas is a genus of snakes in the family Pseudoxyrhophiidae. The genus contains nine species, seven of which are endemic to the island of Madagascar, and two to the Comoros Islands. Its sister taxon is Phisalixella. All of the species are harmless to humans.

== Ecology ==
Lycodryas are arboreal snakes that are believed to be active hunters. However, their ecology is generally poorly known.

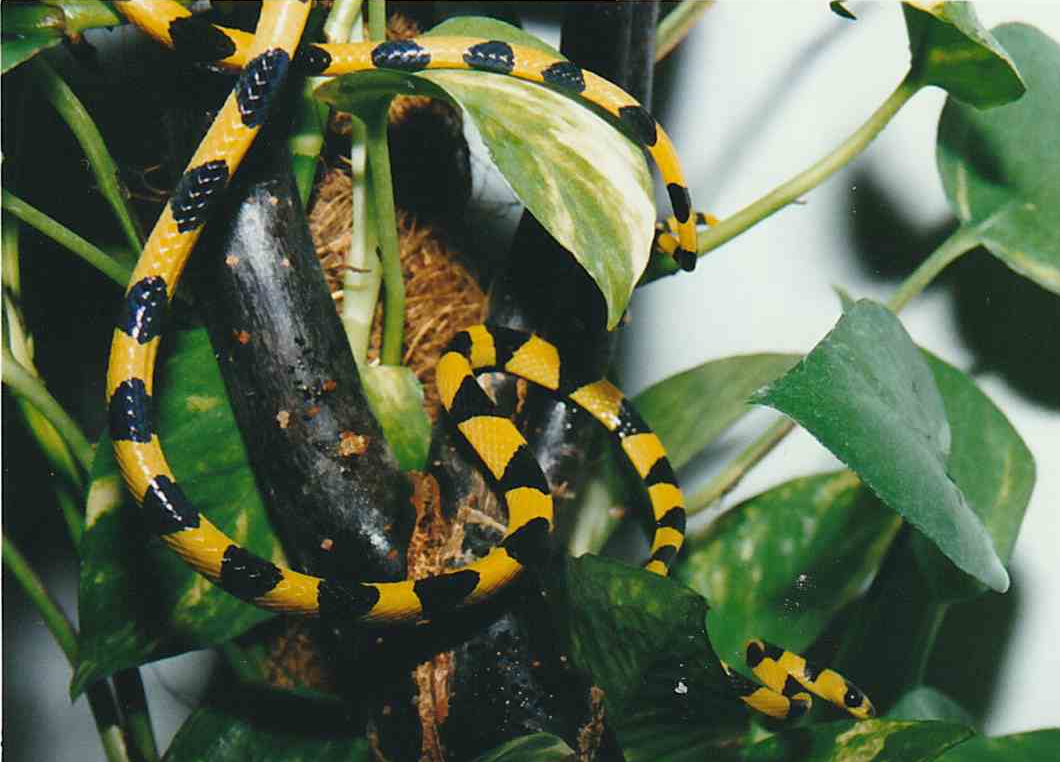
Lycodryas citrinus

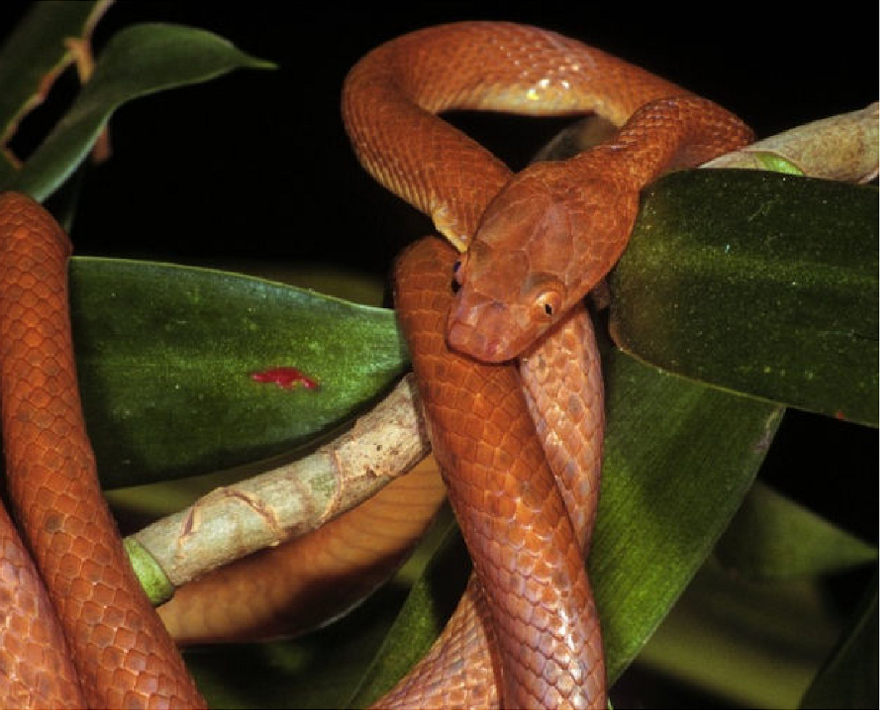
Female Lycodryas cococola

== Description ==
Lycodryas are markedly elongated, slender-bodied snakes with often striking coloration. The head is distinct. They typically have 8 (range: 7–9) upper labials and 6–10 lower labials, 1 loreal scale, 17–19 rows of dorsal scales at mid-body and 13 or 15 rows of dorsal scales at the last ventral, 185–284 ventral scales, anal plate that is usually divided, and 70–130 subcaudal scales. The contracted pupil is a small vertical ellipse.

== Species ==
The following nine species are recognized as being valid.

- Lycodryas citrinus (Domergue, 1995)
- Lycodryas cococola Hawlitschek, Nagy & Glaw, 2012
- Lycodryas gaimardii (Schlegel, 1837)
- Lycodryas granuliceps (Boettger, 1877)
- Lycodryas guentheri (Boulenger, 1896)
- Lycodryas inopinae (Domergue, 1995)
- Lycodryas inornatus (Boulenger, 1896)
- Lycodryas maculatus (Günther, 1858) – spotted tree snake
- Lycodryas pseudogranuliceps (Domergue, 1995)

Nota bene: A binomial authority in parentheses indicates that the species was originally described in a genus other than Lycodryas.
