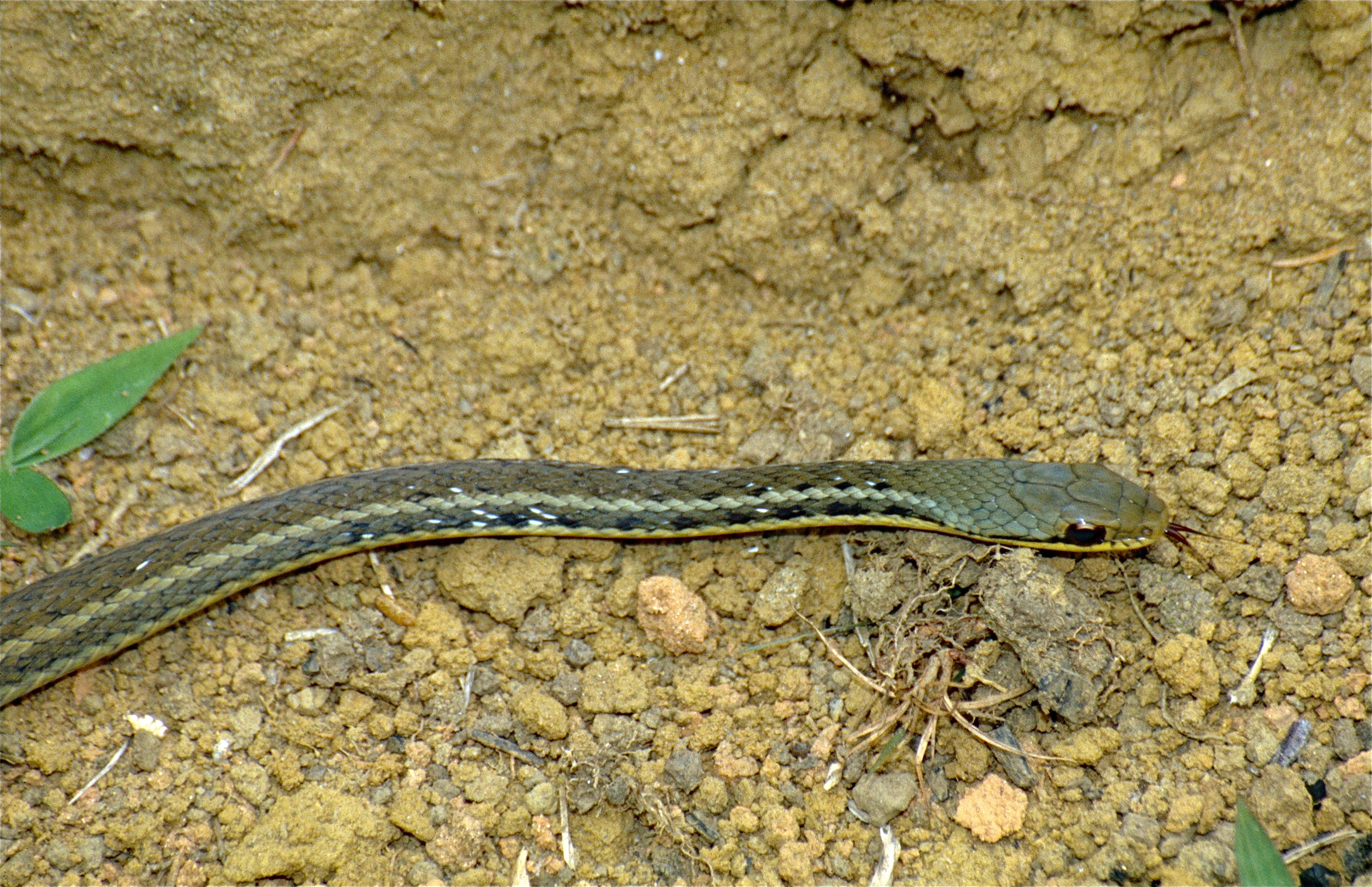

Conservation status
- Vulnerable (IUCN 3.1)

Scientific classification
- Kingdom: Animalia
- Phylum: Chordata
- Class: Reptilia
- Order: Squamata
- Suborder: Serpentes
- Family: Pseudoxyrhophiidae
- Genus: Thamnosophis
- Species: T. stumpffi

Binomial name
- Thamnosophis stumpffi (Boettger, 1881)

Synonyms
- Dromicus stumpffi Boettger, 1881; Tropidonotus stumpffi — Boulenger, 1893; Liophidium gracile Mocquard, 1908; Natrix stumpffi — Barbour, 1918; Liopholidophis stumpffi — Glaw & Vences, 1994; Bibilava stumpffi — Glaw et al., 2007; Thamnosophis stumpffi — Cadle & Ineich, 2008

= Thamnosophis stumpffi =

Species of snake

Thamnosophis stumpffi, commonly known as the yellow-striped water snake, is a species of snake in the subfamily Pseudoxyrhophiinae of the family Pseudoxyrhophiidae. The species is endemic to Madagascar.

== Etymology ==
The specific name, stumpffi, is in honor of Anton Stumpff who collected the holotype.

== Geographic range ==
T. stumpffi is found in northwestern Madagascar, including the island Nosy Be.

== Habitat ==
The preferred natural habitat of T. stumpffi is forest.

== Reproduction ==
T. stumpffi is oviparous.
