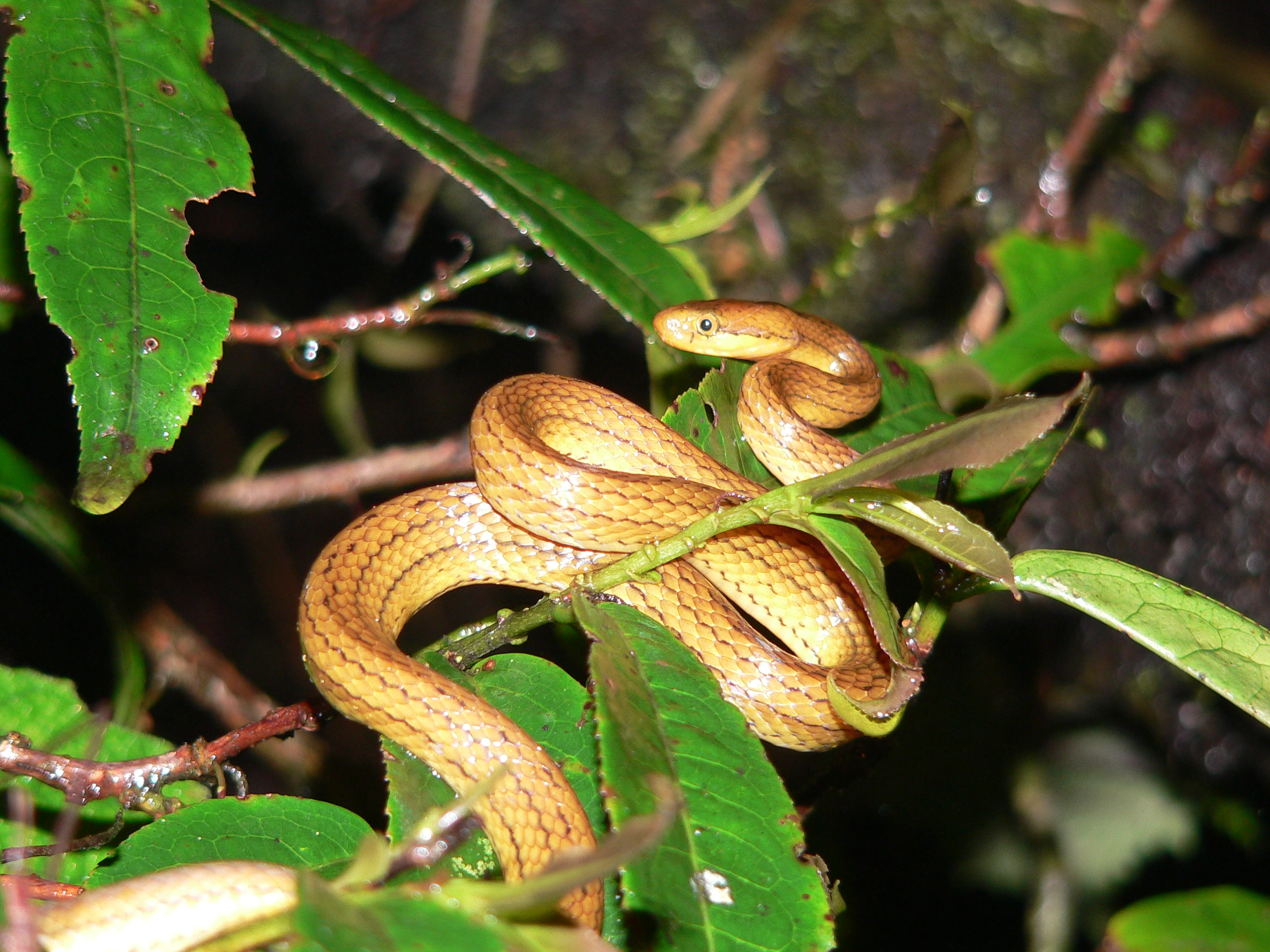

Conservation status
- Least Concern (IUCN 3.1)

Scientific classification
- Kingdom: Animalia
- Phylum: Chordata
- Class: Reptilia
- Order: Squamata
- Suborder: Serpentes
- Family: Pseudoxyrhophiidae
- Genus: Compsophis
- Species: C. laphystius

Binomial name
- Compsophis laphystius (Cadle, 1996)

Synonyms
- Geodipsas laphystia Cadle, 1996; Compsophis (Geodipsas) laphystius — Glaw, Nagy & Vences, 2007; Compsophis laphystius — Wallach, K. Williams & Boundy, 2014

= Compsophis laphystius =

Species of snake

Compsophis laphystius is a species of snake in the subfamily Pseudoxyrhophiinae of the family Pseudoxyrhophiidae. The species is endemic to Madagascar.

== Habitat ==
The preferred natural habitat of C. laphystius is the riparian zone of humid forest.

== Diet ==
C. laphystius preys upon frogs.

== Reproduction ==
C. laphystius is oviparous.
