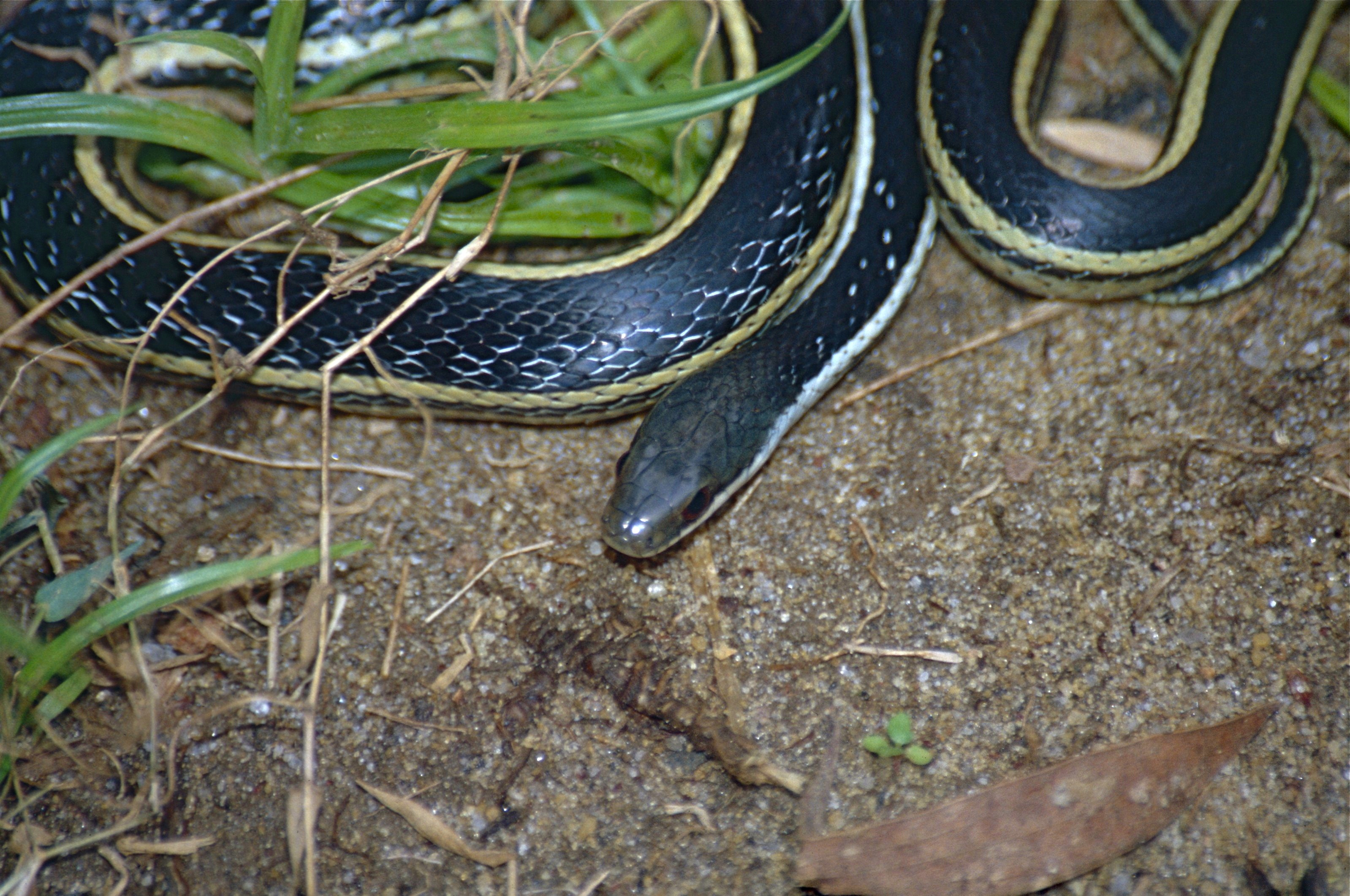

Conservation status
- Least Concern (IUCN 3.1)

Scientific classification
- Kingdom: Animalia
- Phylum: Chordata
- Class: Reptilia
- Order: Squamata
- Suborder: Serpentes
- Family: Pseudoxyrhophiidae
- Genus: Thamnosophis
- Species: T. lateralis

Binomial name
- Thamnosophis lateralis (Duméril, Bibron & Duméril, 1854)

Synonyms
- Leptophis lateralis Duméril, Bibron & Duméril, 1854; Dromicus madagascariensis Günther, 1872; Dromicus baroni Boulenger, 1888; Liopholidophis lateralis (Duméril, Bibron & Duméril, 1854)

= Thamnosophis lateralis =

Species of snake

Thamnosophis lateralis, commonly known as the lateral water snake, is a species of snake in the family Pseudoxyrhophiidae. It is endemic to Madagascar.
