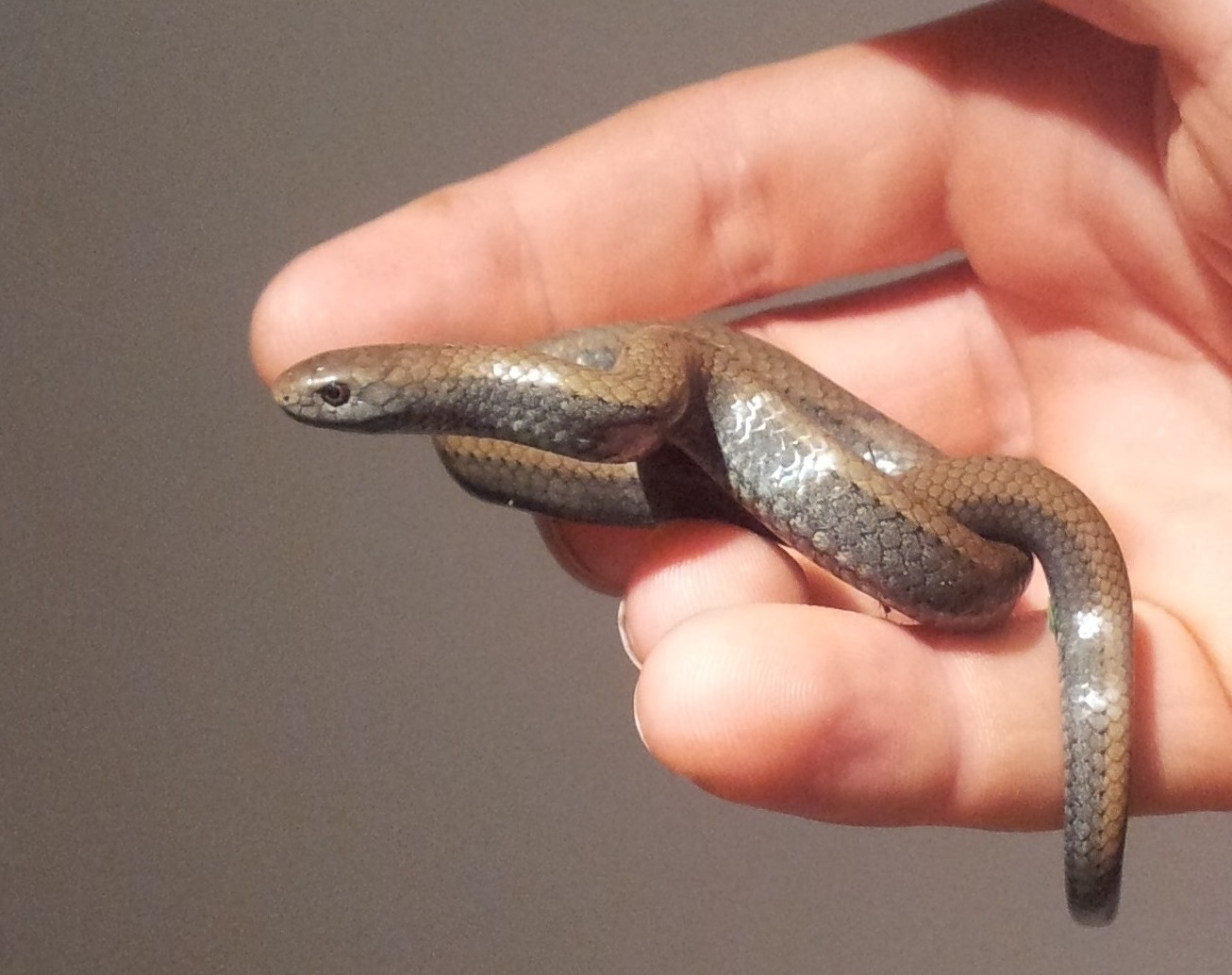

Conservation status
- Least Concern (IUCN 3.1)

Scientific classification
- Kingdom: Animalia
- Phylum: Chordata
- Class: Reptilia
- Order: Squamata
- Suborder: Serpentes
- Family: Pseudoxyrhophiidae
- Subfamily: Amplorhininae
- Genus: Duberria
- Species: D. lutrix

Binomial name
- Duberria lutrix (Linnaeus, 1758)

Synonyms
- Coluber lutrix Linnaeus, 1758; Elaps duberria Schneider, 1790; Calamaria arctiventris Schlegel, 1837; Homalosoma lutrix – A.M.C. Duméril & Bibron, 1854; Duberria lutrix – Broadley, 1998

= Duberria lutrix =

Common slug eater

Species of snake

Duberria lutrix, or the common slug eater, is a small, ovoviviparous, molluscivorous, non-venomous snake, which is endemic to Africa.

== Description ==
Adults can be up to thirty to forty cm (approximately twelve to sixteen inches).

The common slug eater's colour can vary, but they typically have an olive green to brown or russet back, grey flanks, a yellowish or cream belly, and a black, more or less complete, vertebral stripe.

== Geographic range ==
This species is found in Burundi, Democratic Republic of the Congo, Eswatini, Ethiopia, Kenya, Mozambique, Rwanda, South Africa, Tanzania, Uganda, and Zimbabwe.

== Subspecies ==
Six subspecies are recognized, including the nominotypical subspecies.

- Duberria lutrix abyssinica (Boulenger, 1894)
- Duberria lutrix atriventris Sternfeld, 1912
- Duberria lutrix basilewskyi Skelton-Bourgeois, 1961
- Duberria lutrix currylindahli Laurent, 1956
- Duberria lutrix lutrix (Linnaeus, 1758)
- Duberria lutrix rhodesiana Broadley, 1958

== Diet ==
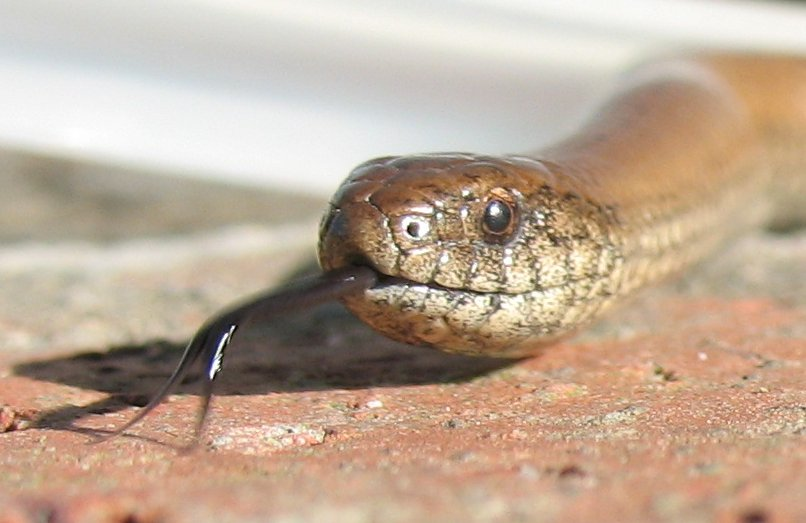
Detail of a slugeater head

As the name implies, the common slug eater is a specialised predator and feeds on snails and slugs, mostly finding its prey through chemoreception, using its tongue. It swallows its prey quickly before too much defensive mucus is produced, extracting snails from their shells through the shell opening, or by smashing the shell against a rock while grasping the soft body in its jaws.

== Breeding ==
The common slug eater usually gives birth to litters of three to twelve young. However, broods from large females may consist of as many as 22 newborns, each measuring 8 to 11 cm (3.1 to 4.3 in). The total combined weight of the young may exceed the weight of the female after giving birth. Birthing season is January and February (late summer in southern Africa).

== Captivity ==
The snake is a popular pet, which feeds and breeds readily, and because of the nature of its prey item, it is easy to keep.

== Defense ==
When alarmed, the snake secretes a noxious substance from glands near the base of the tail and rolls up into a defensive spiral with the head in the middle, leading to the Afrikaans common name tabakrolletjie ("tobacco roll").
