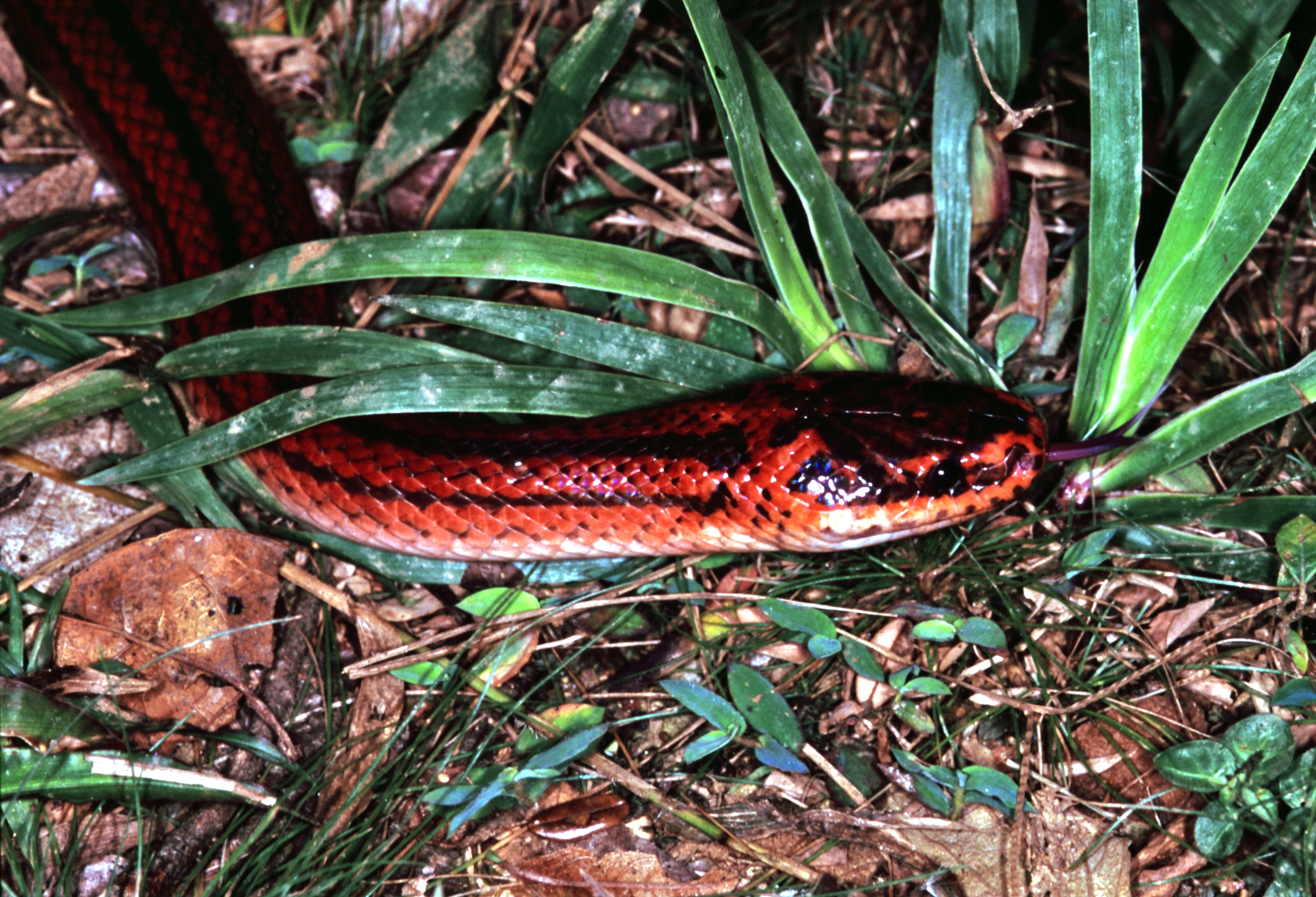

Conservation status
- Least Concern (IUCN 3.1)

Scientific classification
- Kingdom: Animalia
- Phylum: Chordata
- Class: Reptilia
- Order: Squamata
- Suborder: Serpentes
- Family: Pseudoxyrhophiidae
- Genus: Pseudoxyrhopus
- Species: P. tritaeniatus

Binomial name
- Pseudoxyrhopus tritaeniatus Mocquard, 1894

Synonyms
- Pseudoxyrhopus dubius Mocquard, 1904

= Pseudoxyrhopus tritaeniatus =

Species of snake

Pseudoxyrhopus tritaeniatus is a species of snake in the family Pseudoxyrhophiidae. It is endemic to Madagascar. It is commonly known as the Three-Striped Ground Snake.
