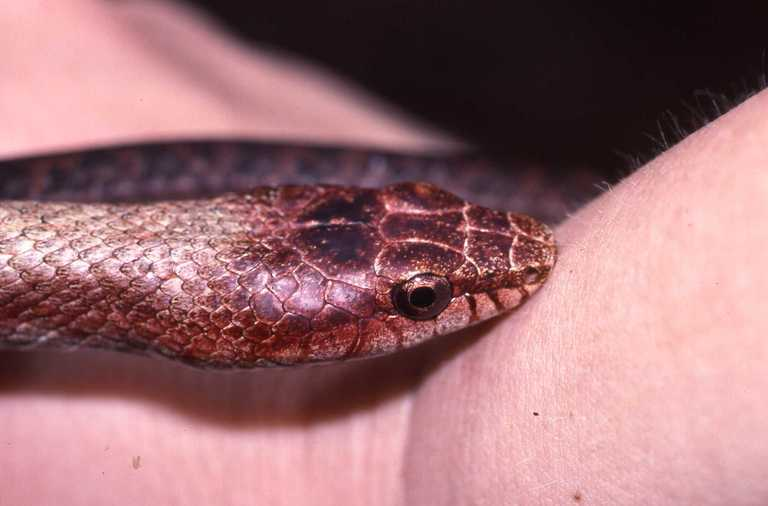

Conservation status
- Least Concern (IUCN 3.1)

Scientific classification
- Kingdom: Animalia
- Phylum: Chordata
- Class: Reptilia
- Order: Squamata
- Suborder: Serpentes
- Family: Pseudoxyrhophiidae
- Genus: Ithycyphus
- Species: I. miniatus

Binomial name
- Ithycyphus miniatus (Schlegel, 1837)

Synonyms
- Coluber miniatus Schlegel, 1837; Dryophylax miniatus — A.M.C. Duméril, Bibron & A.H.A. Duméril, 1854; Philodryas miniatus — Jan, 1863; Ithycyphus miniatus — Boulenger, 1896

= Ithycyphus miniatus =

Species of snake

Ithycyphus miniatus is a species of mildly venomous snake in the family Pseudoxyrhophiidae. The species is native to Madagascar.

== Geographic range ==
I. miniatus is found in northwestern Madagascar.

== Habitat ==
The preferred natural habitats of I. miniatus are forest and shrubland at lower altitudes.

== Venom ==
I. miniatus is calm and reluctant to bite, but has a venom capable of causing severe pain and, possibly, extensive bleeding in humans.

== Behavior and diet ==
I. miniatus is small and nocturnal and preys on grey mouse lemurs and other small mammals.

== In local folklore ==
The common name of I. miniatus in Malagasy is fandrefiala, and it is greatly feared by many rural people of Madagascar, who believe it is able to hypnotize humans with its gaze.

== Taxonomy ==
I. miniatus was originally described and named by Hermann Schlegel in 1837.
