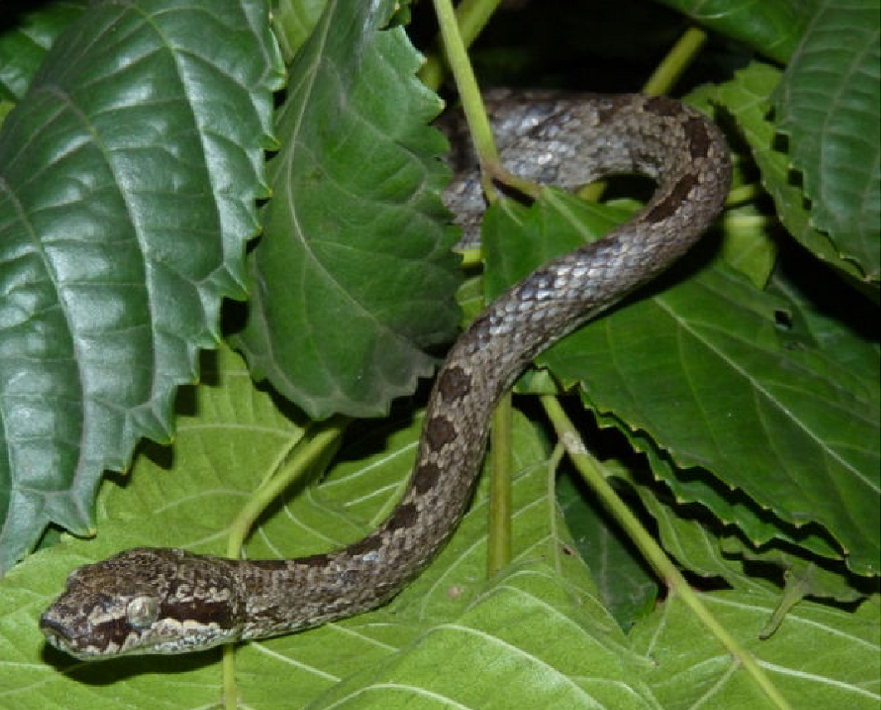

Scientific classification
- Kingdom: Animalia
- Phylum: Chordata
- Class: Reptilia
- Order: Squamata
- Suborder: Serpentes
- Family: Pseudoxyrhophiidae
- Genus: Lycodryas
- Species: L. maculatus

Binomial name
- Lycodryas maculatus (Günther, 1858)

Synonyms
- Dipsadoboa maculata Günther, 1858; Lycodryas sancti johannis Günther, 1879; Stenophis maculatus — Boulenger, 1896; Lycodryas maculatus — Meirte, 1999

= Lycodryas maculatus =

Species of snake

Lycodryas maculatus, also known commonly as the spotted tree snake, is a species of snake in the family Pseudoxyrhophiidae. The species is endemic to the Comoros. It is harmless to humans.

== Geographic range ==
L. maculatus is found on the island Mayotte.

== Description ==
L. maculatus may attain a total length of 65.5 cm (25.8 in), which includes a tail 16.5 cm (6.5 in) long.

== Reproduction ==
L. maculatus is oviparous.
