= Madagascarophis lolo =

Scientific classification
- Kingdom: Animalia
- Phylum: Chordata
- Class: Reptilia
- Order: Squamata
- Suborder: Serpentes
- Family: Pseudoxyrhophiidae
- Genus: Madagascarophis
- Species: M. lolo

Binomial name
- Madagascarophis lolo Ruane, Burbrink, Randriamahatantsoa, and Raxworthy, 2016

Species of snake

Madagascarophis lolo is a species of snake endemic to Madagascar. It is colloquially referred to as the ghost snake due to its strikingly pale coloration. It was initially found inside a lime rock formation in 2016.

== Description ==
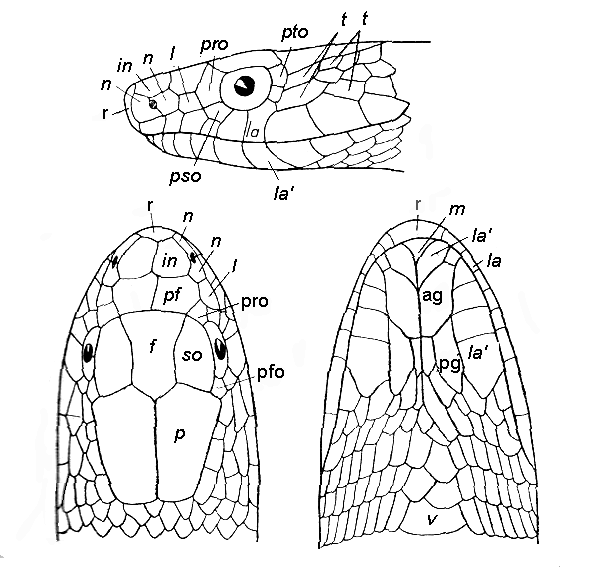
la' indicates infralabial scales

Madagascarophis lolo can be identified from other species in its genus by its gray overall body color with a black vertebral stripe and dorsal alternating lighter gray splotches. It has 25 midbody scale rows, 189 ventral scales and 56 divided subcaudal scales. With the exception of M. fuchsi, it differs from all other Madagascarophis species by having extended contact of posterior infralabial scales. M. lolo can be distinguished from M. fuchsi by its slightly lower number of infralabial scales, with M. lolo having around 10 infralabial scales, versus approximately 12–13 infralabial scales in M. fuchsi.

== Behavior ==
Like other species of Madagascarophis, M. lolo is nocturnal.

== Habitat ==
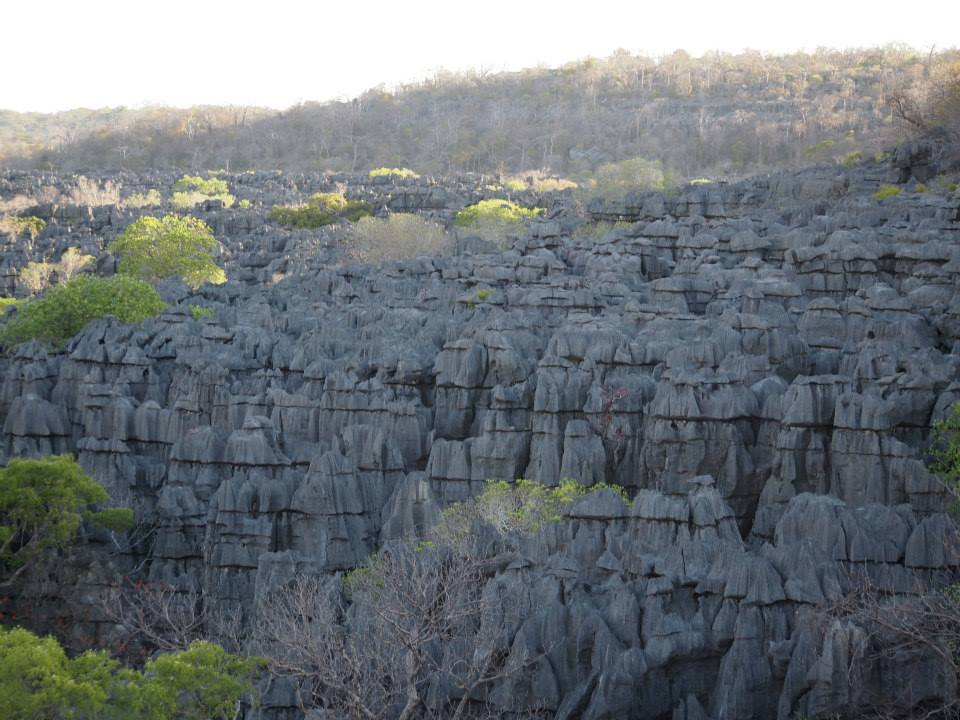
Ankarana Reserve karst in Ankarana National Park, the park in which Madagascophis lolo was first sighted and documented.

Madagascarophis lolo is terrestrial and semi-arboreal, and is mainly found on karst rock formations. Researchers propose that the rarity of M. lolo sightings could be due to the rough terrain which the species inhabits; the karst rock formations are difficult to navigate, especially in the night, when M. lolo would be active.

== Distribution ==
Madagascarophis lolo is probably endemic to karst areas of Analamerana and Ankarana in northern Madagascar.

== Etymology ==
Madagascarophis lolo gets its specific name lolo from the Malagasy word for "ghost". The name refers to both the pale gray color of the ghost snake, and the elusiveness of the species relative to other species in an area of Ankarana that is relatively well explored.

== See also ==
- Wildlife of Madagascar
