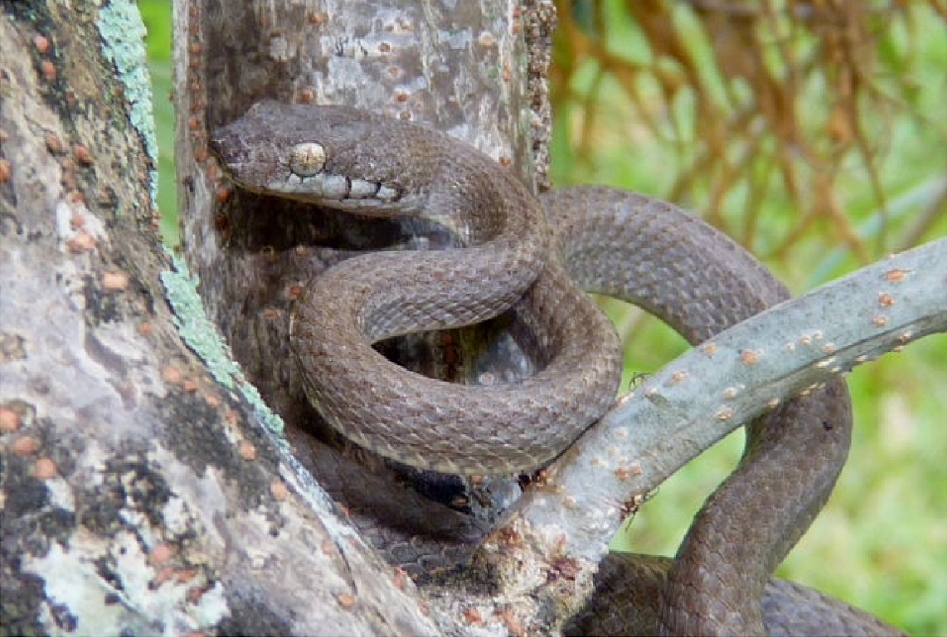

Scientific classification
- Kingdom: Animalia
- Phylum: Chordata
- Class: Reptilia
- Order: Squamata
- Suborder: Serpentes
- Family: Pseudoxyrhophiidae
- Genus: Lycodryas
- Species: L. cococola

Binomial name
- Lycodryas cococola Hawlitschek, Nagy & Glaw, 2012

= Lycodryas cococola =

Species of snake

Lycodryas cococola is a species of snakes of the family Pseudoxyrhophiidae.

== Geographic range ==
Harmless to humans, the snake is found in Comoros.
