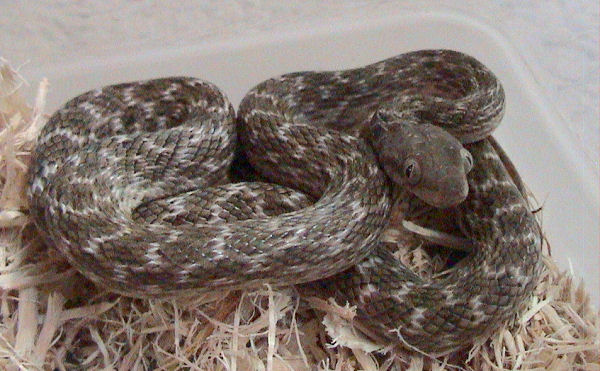

Conservation status
- Least Concern (IUCN 3.1)

Scientific classification
- Kingdom: Animalia
- Phylum: Chordata
- Class: Reptilia
- Order: Squamata
- Suborder: Serpentes
- Family: Pseudoxyrhophiidae
- Genus: Madagascarophis
- Species: M. colubrinus

Binomial name
- Madagascarophis colubrinus (Schlegel, 1837)

= Madagascarophis colubrinus =

Species of snake

Madagascarophis colubrinus, commonly known as a Madagascan cat-eyed snake, is a species of snake of the family Pseudoxyrhophiidae.

== Geographic range ==
The snake is found in Madagascar.
