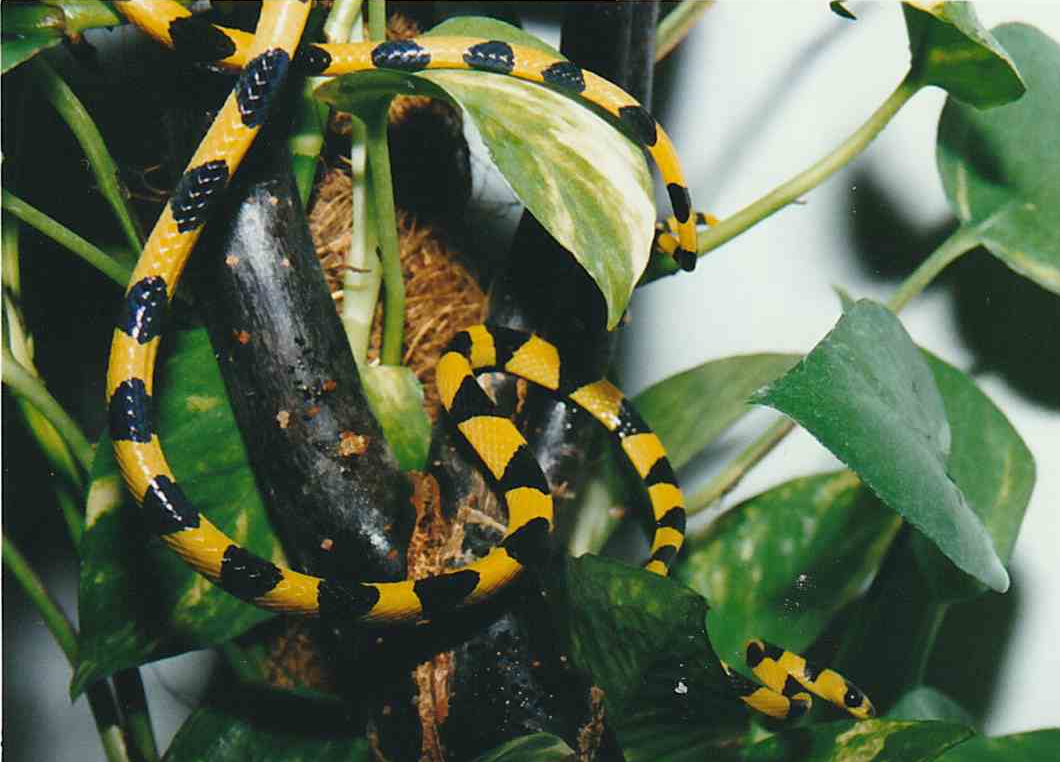

Conservation status
- Vulnerable (IUCN 3.1)

Scientific classification
- Kingdom: Animalia
- Phylum: Chordata
- Order: Squamata
- Suborder: Serpentes
- Family: Pseudoxyrhophiidae
- Genus: Lycodryas
- Species: L. citrinus

Binomial name
- Lycodryas citrinus (Domergue, 1995)

= Lycodryas citrinus =

Species of snake

Lycodryas citrinus is a species of snake of the family Pseudoxyrhophiidae.

== Geographic range ==
The snake is found in Madagascar.

== Description ==
The snake is bright yellow with black spots on its back.
