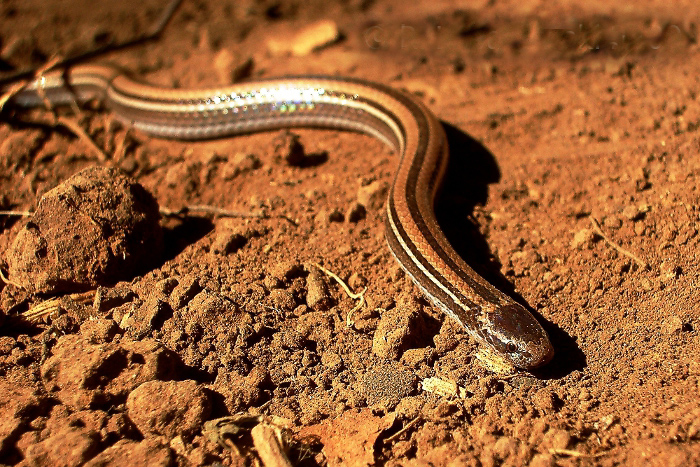

Conservation status
- Vulnerable (IUCN 3.1)

Scientific classification
- Kingdom: Animalia
- Phylum: Chordata
- Class: Reptilia
- Order: Squamata
- Suborder: Serpentes
- Family: Pseudoxyrhophiidae
- Genus: Pararhadinaea; Boettger, 1898
- Species: P. melanogaster

Binomial name
- Pararhadinaea melanogaster Boettger, 1898

= Pararhadinaea =

Madagascar Burrowing Snake

Genus of snakes

Pararhadinaea is a monotypic genus of snakes in the family Pseudoxyrhophiidae. The only species is Pararhadinaea melanogaster, sometimes known as the Madagascar burrowing snake. It is endemic to the island of Madagascar.

== Description ==
It is a small snake with a maximum recorded size of less than 30 centimeters. The color pattern consists of a pale golden-brown ground color with a series of dark-brown and cream parallel longitudinal stripes. The ventral scales are very dark, almost black. The smooth scales show a strong green-blue iridescence.

One subspecies (P. melanogaster marojejyensis) is currently recognized.

== Geographic range ==
Endemic to Madagascar. Occurs in the northern parts of the island. The type locality is Nosy Be. The single known specimen of the subspecies, P. melanogaster marojejyensis, was collected from the Marojejy National Park.

== Habitat ==
The species has only been found within forested habitats including both Madagascar dry deciduous forests and Madagascar lowland forests at a few localities including Nosy Be, Ankarana Special Reserve, and Daraina Conservation Site and some unprotected forest fragments near the village of Tsarakibany.

== Conservation status ==
Pararhadinaea melanogaster is listed as Vulnerable by the IUCN Red List of Threatened Species because "its extent of occurrence is less than 6,500 km², it is presently known from only seven locations, and there is a continuing decline in the extent and quality of its forest habitat resulting from agricultural conversion". It is considered a rare species as, since its discovery, only nine specimens have been officially recorded.

== Behaviour ==
Almost nothing is known of the behaviour of this species. It is very secretive and seems to spend most of the day hiding amongst leaf litter, under logs and possibly even below the ground.

== Feeding ==
The diet is likely to consist of small invertebrates.

== Reproduction ==
Nothing is known of the breeding behaviour of this species. It is presumed to lay eggs.
