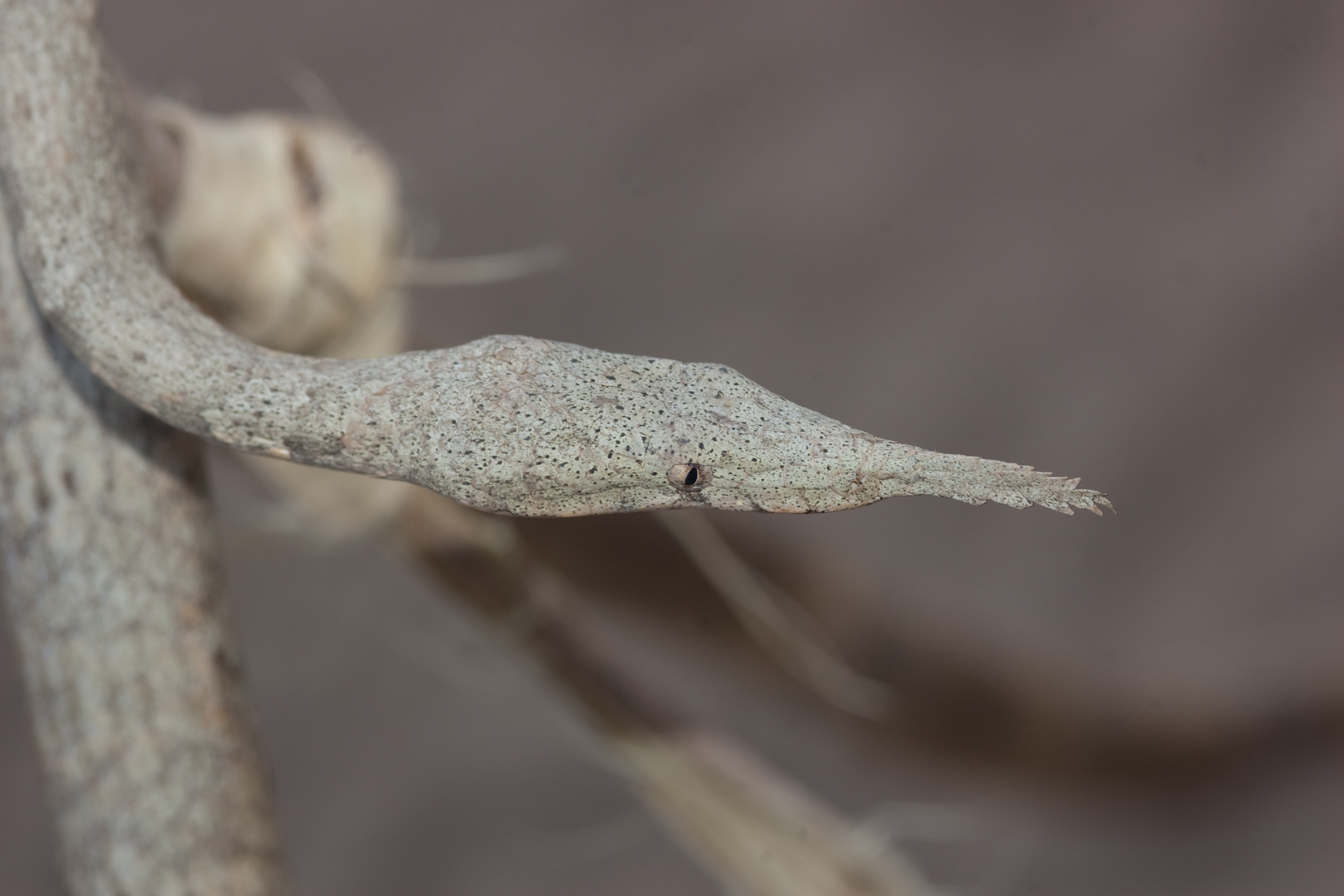
- Female L. madagascariensis

Conservation status
- Least Concern (IUCN 3.1)

Scientific classification
- Kingdom: Animalia
- Phylum: Chordata
- Class: Reptilia
- Order: Squamata
- Suborder: Serpentes
- Family: Pseudoxyrhophiidae
- Genus: Langaha
- Species: L. madagascariensis

Binomial name
- Langaha madagascariensis Bonnaterre, 1790

Synonyms
- Langaha nasuta Shaw, 1802; Langaha crista-galli Duméril & Bibron 1854; Langaha ensifera Duméril & Bibron 1854; Langaha intermedia Boulenger 1888

= Langaha madagascariensis =

Species of snake

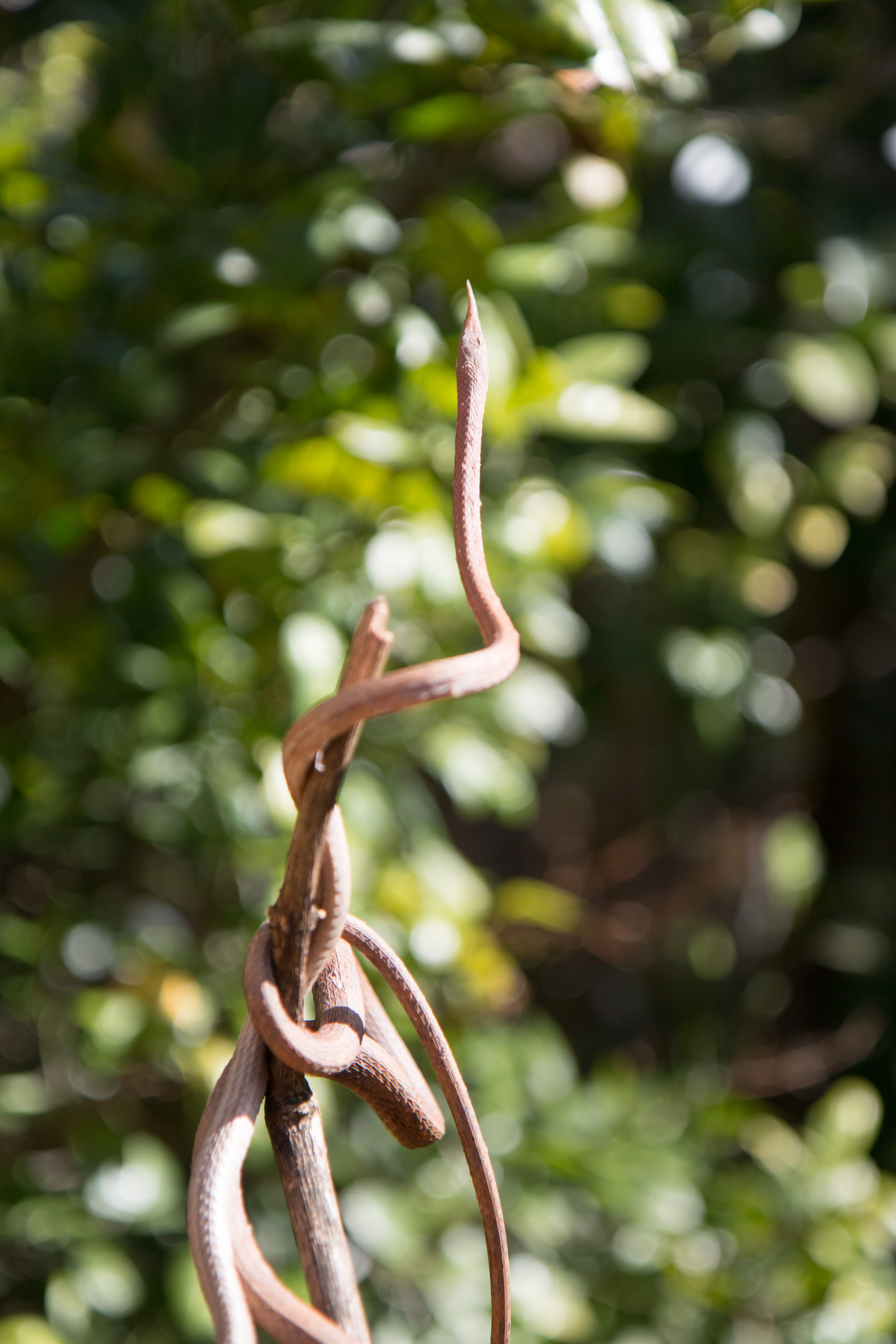

Langaha madagascariensis (formerly Langaha nasuta, commonly known as the Madagascar or Malagasy leaf-nosed snake) is a medium-sized non-venomous highly cryptic arboreal species. It is endemic to Madagascar and found in deciduous dry forests and rain forests, often in vegetation 1.5 to 2 meters above the ground.

== Description ==
Malagasy leaf-nosed snakes can grow up to 1 meter in length. There is considerable sexual dimorphism within the species; the males are dorsally brown and ventrally yellow with a long tapering snout, while the females are mottled grey with a flattened, leaf shaped snout. The function of their appendage is unknown, but obviously also serves as camouflage. They have unusually slender bodies and can be identified by their long, pointy snouts. Their diet is mainly made up of frogs and lizards. These snakes are known for their unusually high levels of sexual dimorphism.

It is largely a sit-and-wait predator. It may show curious resting behaviour, hanging straight down from a branch. Prey items include arboreal and terrestrial lizards. It also exhibits hooding while stalking prey. These hooding and swaying behaviours along with its cryptic colour patterns, might allow L. madagascariensis to mimic a vine swaying in the wind.

Leaf-nosed snakes are oviparous with clutch sizes ranging from 5 to 11 eggs. Malagasy leaf-nosed snakes are generally calm and reluctant to bite unless provoked.
