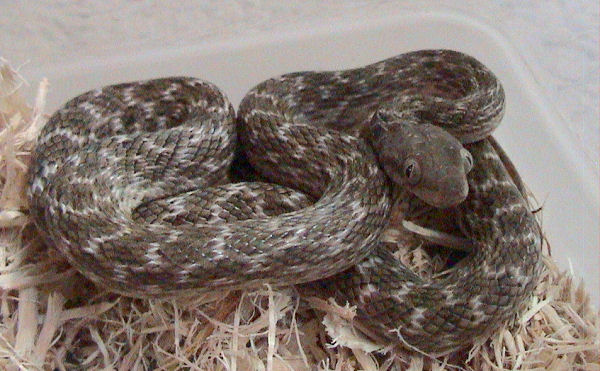
- Madagascarophis colubrinus

Scientific classification
- Domain: Eukaryota
- Kingdom: Animalia
- Phylum: Chordata
- Class: Reptilia
- Order: Squamata
- Suborder: Serpentes
- Family: Pseudoxyrhophiidae
- Subfamily: Pseudoxyrhophiinae
- Genus: Madagascarophis; Mertens, 1952

= Madagascarophis =

Genus of snakes

Madagascarophis is a genus of small, mildly venomous snakes native to the island of Madagascar. They are commonly referred to as Malagasy cat-eyed snakes. Five species are in the genus.

== Species ==
- Madagascarophis colubrinus
  - Madagascarophis colubrinus citrinus (Boettger, 1877)
  - Madagascarophis colubrinus colubrinus (Schlegel, 1837)
  - Madagascarophis colubrinus insularis Domergue, 1987
  - Madagascarophis. colubrinus occidentalis Domergue, 1987
  - Madagascarophis colubrinus pastoriensis Domergue, 1987
  - Madagascarophis colubrinus septentrionalis Domergue, 1987
- Madagascarophis fuchsi Glaw, Kucharzewski, Köhler, Vences & Nagy, 2013
- Madagascarophis lolo Ruane, Burbrink, Randriamahatantsoa, & Raxworthy, 2016
- Madagascarophis meridionalis Domergue, 1987
- Madagascarophis ocellatus Domergue, 1987

== Description ==
Madagascarophis species are small snakes, rarely exceeding 100 cm in adult size. They are highly variable in color, greys, browns, yellows, greens, and oranges with darker colored blotches. They have large eyes with vertical pupils.

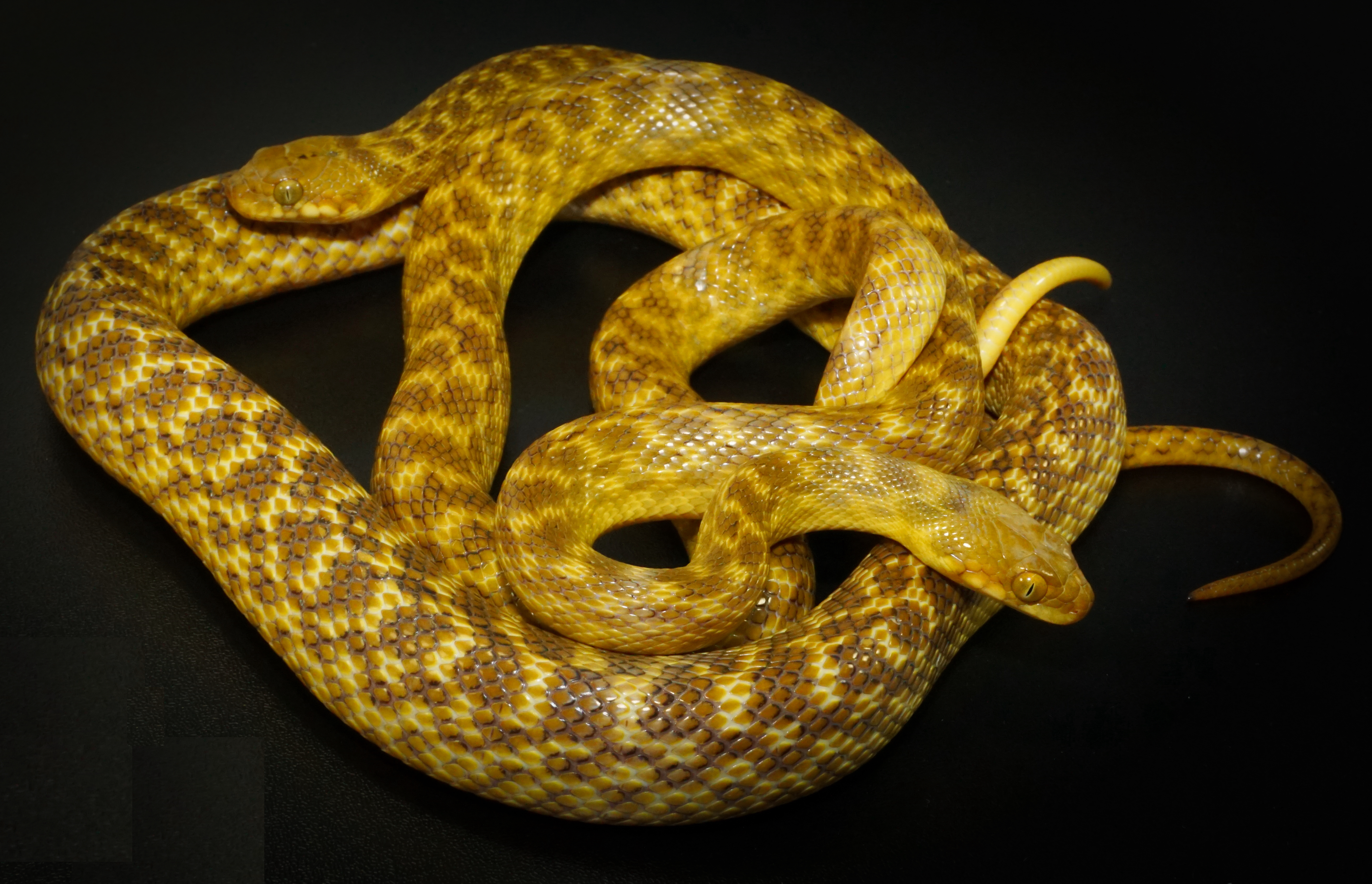
A pair of gold phase Madagascarophis.

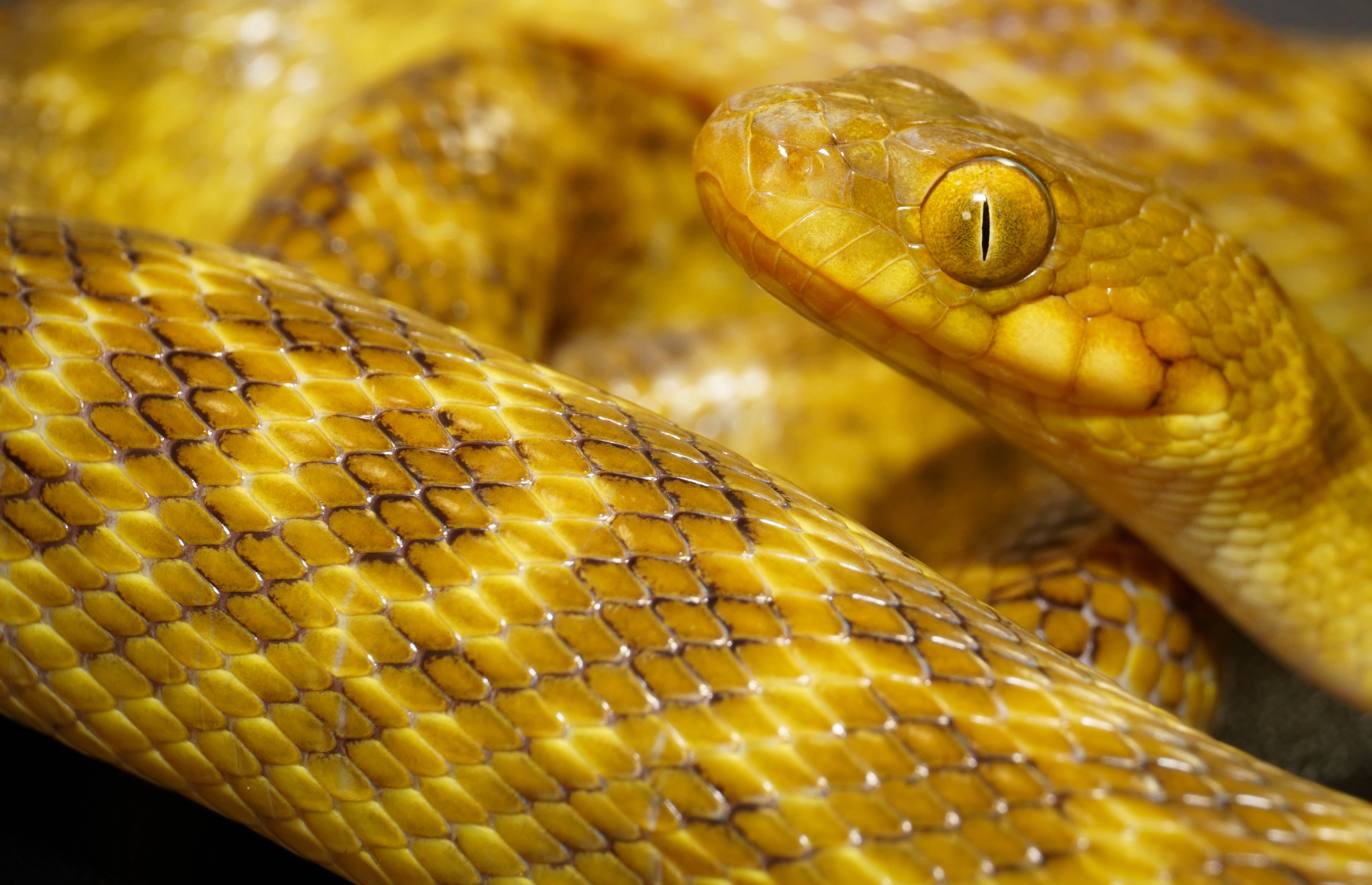
Close-up of a young Madagascarophis.

== Behavior ==
Malagasy cat-eyed snakes are found in a wide variety of habitats throughout the island of Madagascar, from montane regions to rain forest. Primarily nocturnal and terrestrial, they are capable of climbing and are strong swimmers. They feed on a variety of prey, including chameleons and rodents. Their venom is mild and often not powerful enough to subdue their chosen prey items, so they also employ constriction as necessary.

== In captivity ==
Madagascarophis colubrinus and M. ocellatus are frequently imported for the exotic pet trade, and for educational research. The Ophidian Research Colony of the University of Texas at Tyler is known to keep a breeding group of M. colubrinus. The eggs take 83 days to hatch as young snakes at 27 °C.
