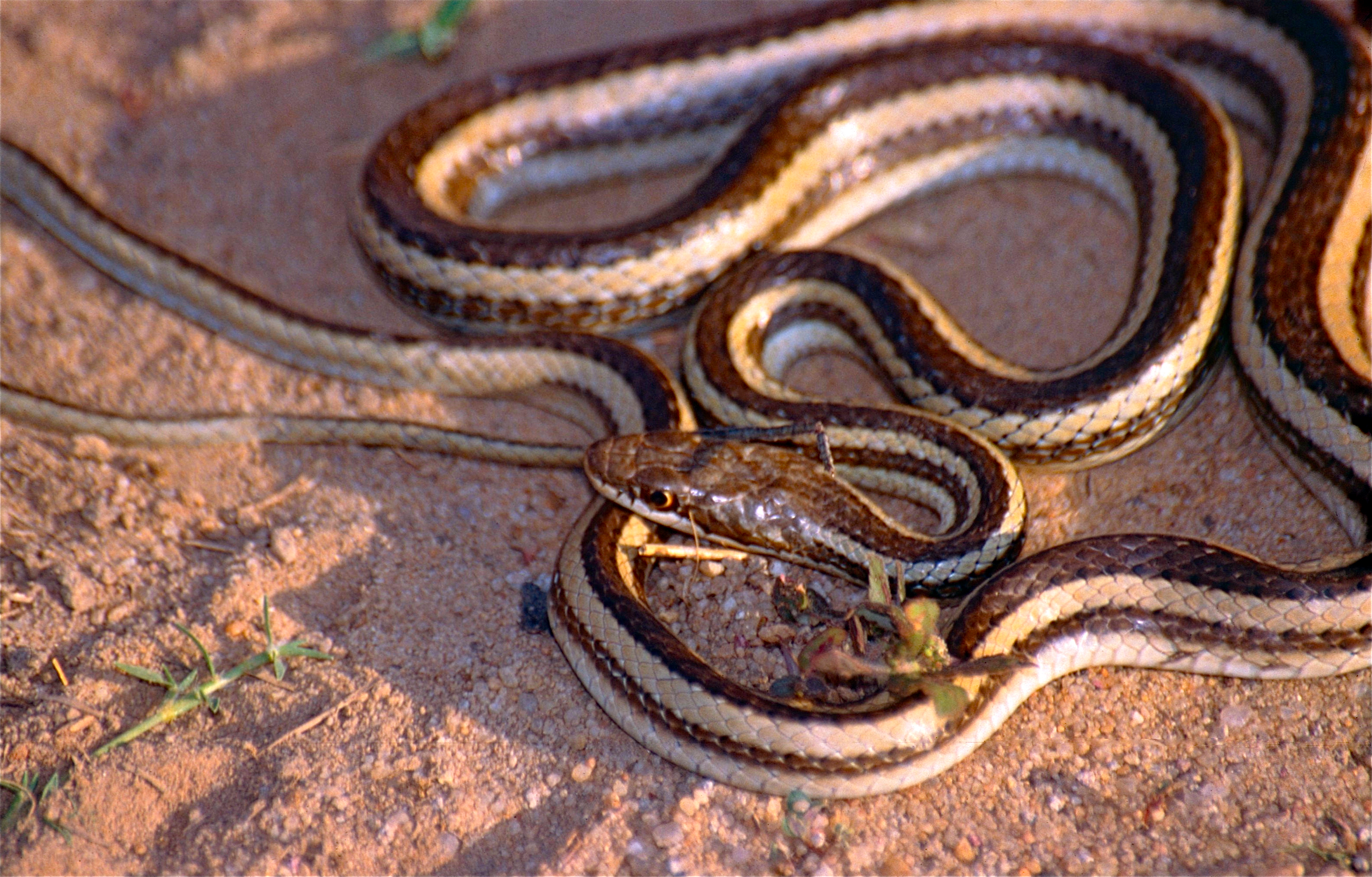
- Dromicodryas bernieri

Scientific classification
- Kingdom: Animalia
- Phylum: Chordata
- Class: Reptilia
- Order: Squamata
- Suborder: Serpentes
- Family: Pseudoxyrhophiidae
- Subfamily: Pseudoxyrhophiinae
- Genus: Dromicodryas; Boulenger, 1893

Species
- Two recognized species, see article.

= Dromicodryas =

Genus of snakes

Dromicodryas is a genus of pseudoxyrhophiid snakes found only on the island of Madagascar. They are harmless to humans.

== Species ==
Two species are currently recognized.

- Dromicodryas bernieri (A.M.C. Duméril, Bibron & A.H.A. Duméril, 1854) – Bernier's striped snake
- Dromicodryas quadrilineatus (A.M.C. Duméril, Bibron & A.H.A. Duméril, 1854) – four-striped snake

Nota bene: A binomial authority in parentheses indicates that the species was originally described in a genus other than Dromicodryas.

== Etymology ==
The specific name, bernieri, is in honor of French naval surgeon Alphonse Charles Joseph Bernier (1802–1858), who collected natural history specimens in Madagascar.
