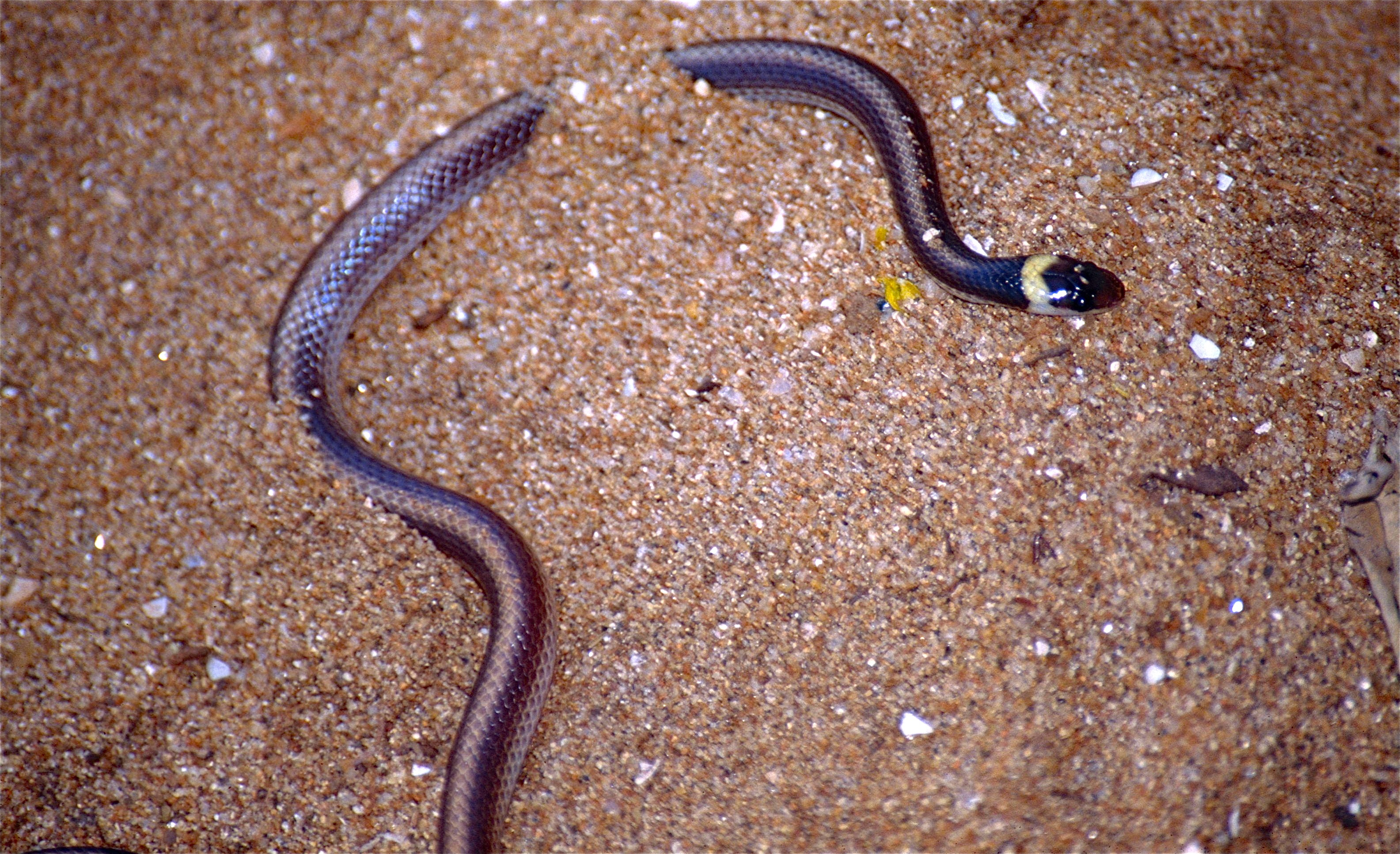

Scientific classification
- Kingdom: Animalia
- Phylum: Chordata
- Class: Reptilia
- Order: Squamata
- Suborder: Serpentes
- Family: Pseudoxyrhophiidae
- Subfamily: Pseudoxyrhophiinae
- Genus: Heteroliodon; Boettger, 1913

Species
- Three recognized species, see article.

= Heteroliodon =

Genus of snakes

Heteroliodon is a genus of snake in the pseudoxyrhophiid family found only on the island of Madagascar. They are harmless to humans.

== Species ==
Three species are currently recognized.

- Heteroliodon fohy - Glaw, Vences, & Nussbaum, 2005
- Heteroliodon lava - Nussbaum & Raxworthy, 2000
- Heteroliodon occipitalis - (Boulenger, 1896)
