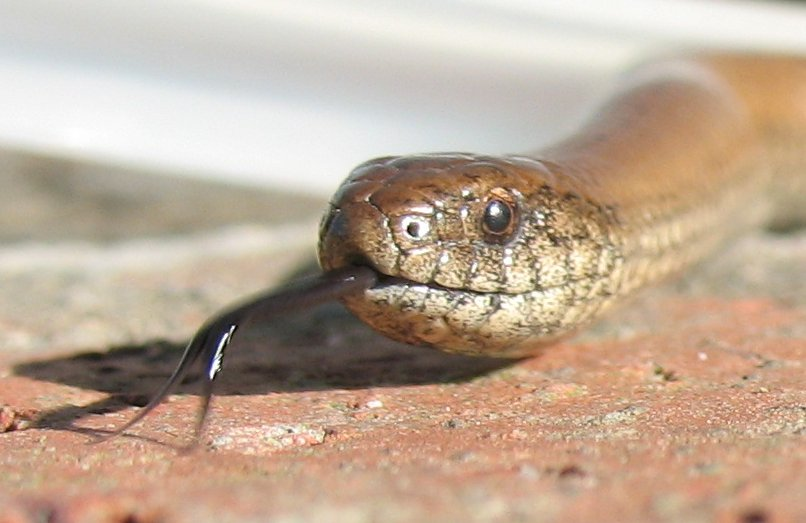
- Duberria lutrix

Scientific classification
- Kingdom: Animalia
- Phylum: Chordata
- Class: Reptilia
- Order: Squamata
- Suborder: Serpentes
- Family: Pseudoxyrhophiidae
- Subfamily: Amplorhininae
- Genus: Duberria; Fitzinger, 1826

= Duberria =

Genus of snakes

Duberria is a genus of snakes of the family Pseudoxyrhophiidae.

== Species ==
- Duberria lutrix (Linnaeus, 1758)
- Duberria rhodesiana (Broadley, 1958)
- Duberria shirana (Boulenger, 1894)
- Duberria variegata (Peters, 1854)
