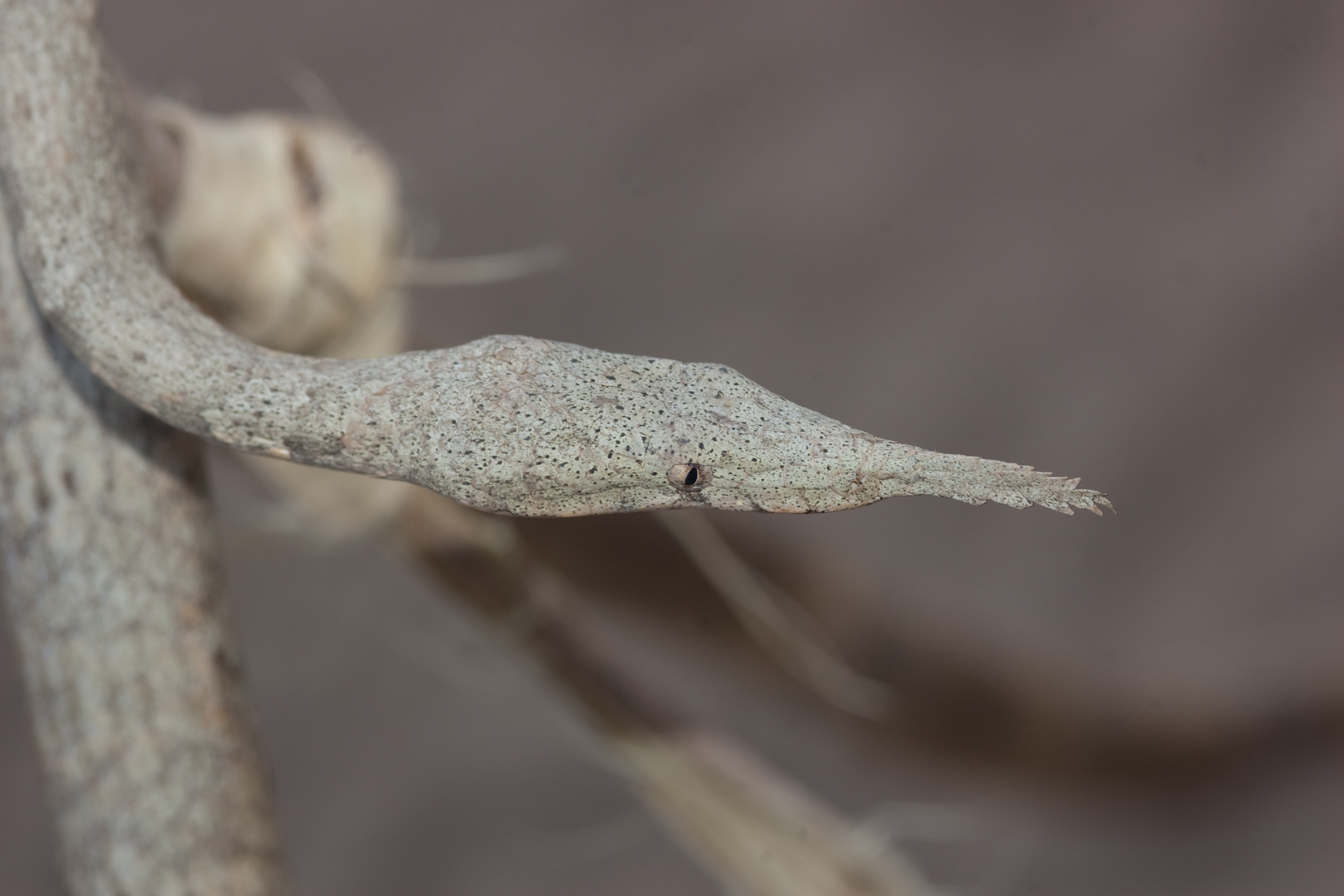
- Langaha madagascariensis

Scientific classification
- Kingdom: Animalia
- Phylum: Chordata
- Class: Reptilia
- Order: Squamata
- Suborder: Serpentes
- Family: Pseudoxyrhophiidae
- Subfamily: Pseudoxyrhophiinae
- Genus: Langaha; Bonnaterre, 1790

Type species
- Langaha madagascariensis

Species
- Three recognized species. See text.

= Langaha =

Genus of snakes

Langaha is a small genus of elapoid snakes in the family Pseudoxyrhophiidae. The genus contains three species, all of which are endemic to Madagascar.They are non-venomous.

== Species ==
These species are non-venomous. There are three described species in the genus Langaha:

- Langaha alluaudi Mocquard, 1901 – southern leafnose snake
- Langaha madagascariensis Bonnaterre, 1790 – Madagascar leafnose snake
- Langaha pseudoalluaudi Domergue, 1988

== Etymology ==
The specific name, alluaudi, is in honor of French entomologist Charles Alluaud.

== Taxonomy ==
The taxonomy of L. alluaudi and L. pseudoalluaudi is in need of revision, as some records of pseudoalluaudi are now thought to represent alluaudi.
