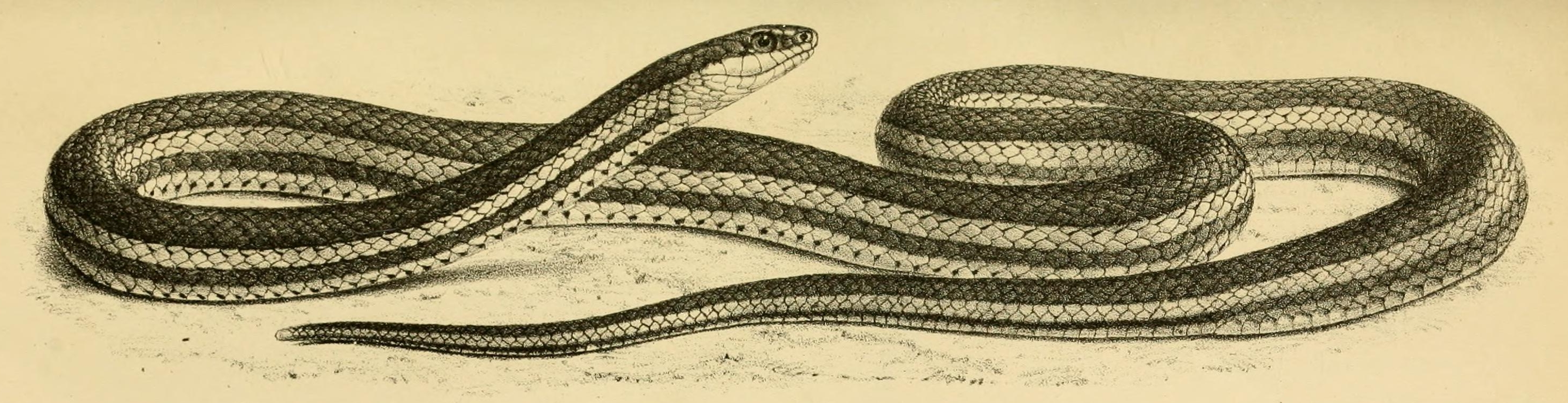
- Thamnosophis lateralis

Scientific classification
- Kingdom: Animalia
- Phylum: Chordata
- Class: Reptilia
- Order: Squamata
- Suborder: Serpentes
- Family: Pseudoxyrhophiidae
- Subfamily: Pseudoxyrhophiinae
- Genus: Thamnosophis; Jan, 1863

Type species
- Thamnosophis lateralis

Species
- Six recognized species, see article.

= Thamnosophis =

Genus of snakes

Thamnosophis is a genus of snakes in the family Pseudoxyrhophiidae. The genus is endemic to the island of Madagascar. As of 2025, six species are recognized as being valid.

== Species ==
- Thamnosophis epistibes (Cadle, 1996)
- Thamnosophis infrasignatus (Günther, 1882)
- Thamnosophis lateralis (A.M.C. Duméril, Bibron & A.H.A. Duméril, 1854) – lateral water snake
- Thamnosophis martae (Glaw, Franzen & Vences, 2005)
- Thamnosophis mavotenda Glaw, Nagy, J. Köhler, Franzen & Vences, 2009
- Thamnosophis stumpffi (Boettger, 1881) – yellow-striped water snake

Nota bene: A binomial authority in parentheses indicates that the species was originally described in a genus other than Thamnosophis.

== Etymology ==
The specific name, martae, is in honor of Marta Puente Molins, who assisted the taxon authors in their fieldwork.
