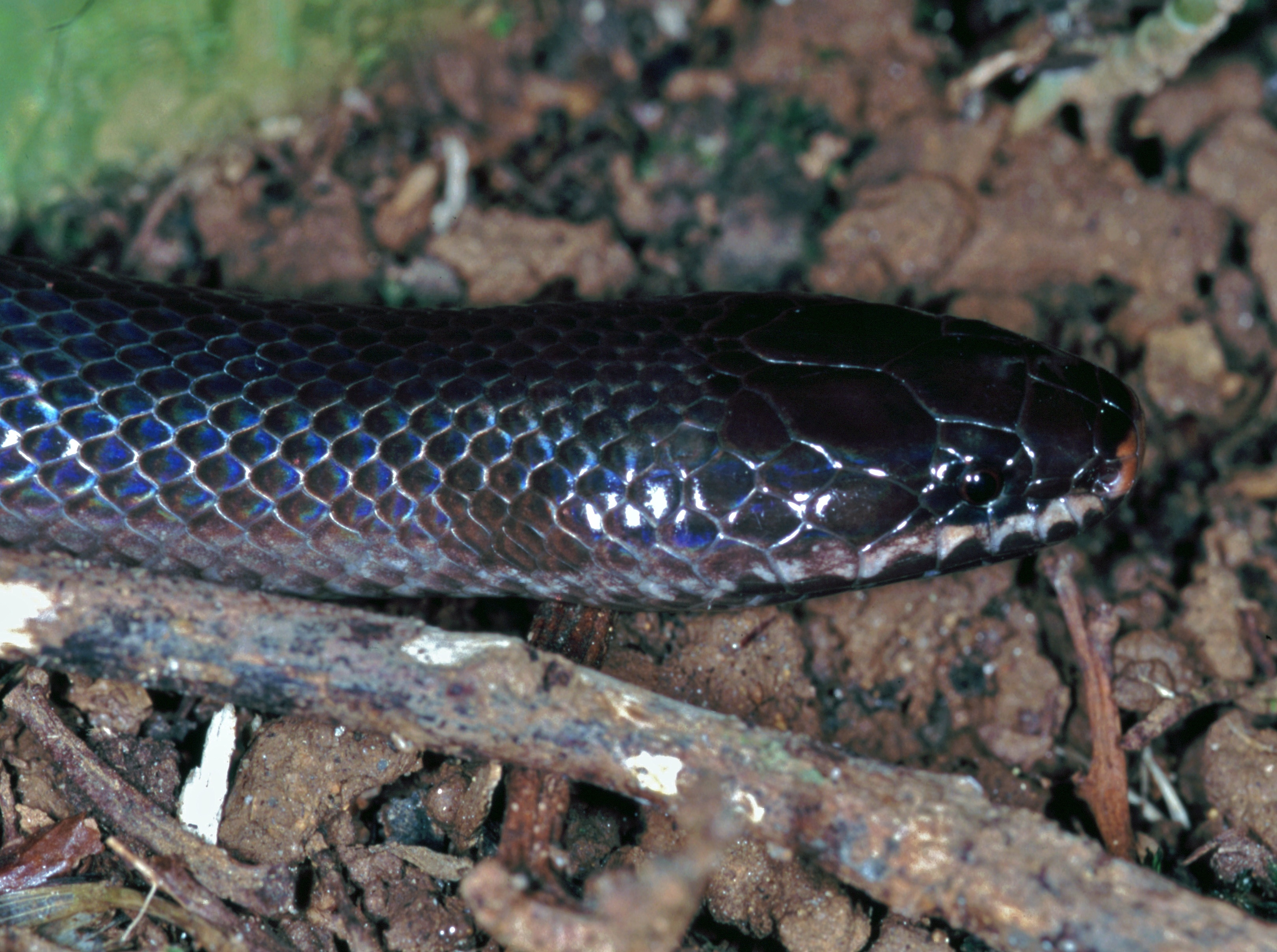
- Pseudoxyrhopus heterurus

Scientific classification
- Kingdom: Animalia
- Phylum: Chordata
- Class: Reptilia
- Order: Squamata
- Suborder: Serpentes
- Family: Pseudoxyrhophiidae
- Subfamily: Pseudoxyrhophiinae
- Genus: Pseudoxyrhopus; Günther, 1881

Species
- 11 recognized species, see article.

= Pseudoxyrhopus =

Genus of snakes

Pseudoxyrhopus is a genus of harmless pseudoxyrhophiids found only on the island of Madagascar. Eleven species are currently recognized.

== Species ==
- Pseudoxyrhopus ambreensis Mocquard, 1895
- Pseudoxyrhopus analabe Nussbaum, Andreone & Raxworthy, 1998
- Pseudoxyrhopus ankafinaensis Raxworthy & Nussbaum, 1994
- Pseudoxyrhopus heterurus (Jan, 1893) — Night Brook Snake
- Pseudoxyrhopus imerinae (Günther, 1890) — Plateau Brook Snake
- Pseudoxyrhopus kely Raxworthy & Nussbaum, 1994
- Pseudoxyrhopus microps Günther, 1881 — Brown Brook Snake
- Pseudoxyrhopus oblecator Cadle, 1999
- Pseudoxyrhopus quinquelineatus (Günther, 1881) — Striped Brook Snake
- Pseudoxyrhopus sokosoko Raxworthy & Nussbaum, 1994
- Pseudoxyrhopus tritaeniatus Mocquard, 1894
