= Alluaudina =

Scientific classification
- Kingdom: Animalia
- Phylum: Chordata
- Class: Reptilia
- Order: Squamata
- Suborder: Serpentes
- Family: Pseudoxyrhophiidae
- Subfamily: Pseudoxyrhophiinae
- Genus: Alluaudina; Mocquard, 1894

Genus of snakes

Alluaudina is a genus of harmless snakes in the family Pseudoxyrhophiidae. The genus is endemic to the island of Madagascar.

== Species ==
Two species are recognized as being valid.

- Alluaudina bellyi Mocquard, 1894
- Alluaudina mocquardi Angel, 1939

== Etymology ==
The generic name, Alluaudina, is in honor of French entomologist Charles Alluaud, who was one of the two collectors of the type specimen of A. bellyi. The specific name, bellyi, is in honor of a certain Mr. Belly who was the other collector of the same type specimen. The specific name, mocquardi, is in honor of French herpetologist François Mocquard, the author of this genus.
