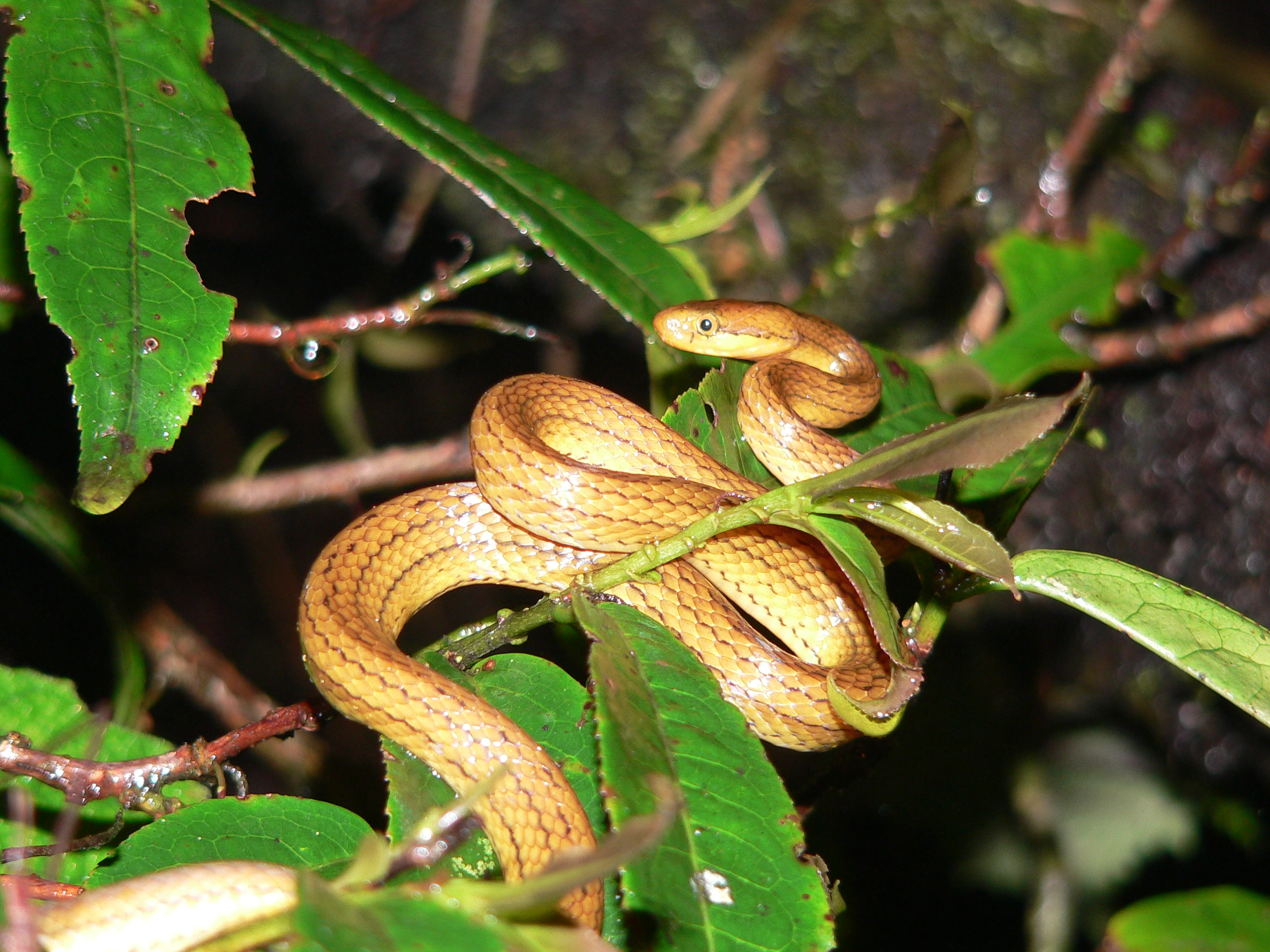
- Compsophis laphystius

Scientific classification
- Kingdom: Animalia
- Phylum: Chordata
- Class: Reptilia
- Order: Squamata
- Suborder: Serpentes
- Family: Pseudoxyrhophiidae
- Subfamily: Pseudoxyrhophiinae
- Genus: Compsophis; Mocquard, 1894

Species
- Seven recognized species, see article.

= Compsophis =

Genus of snakes

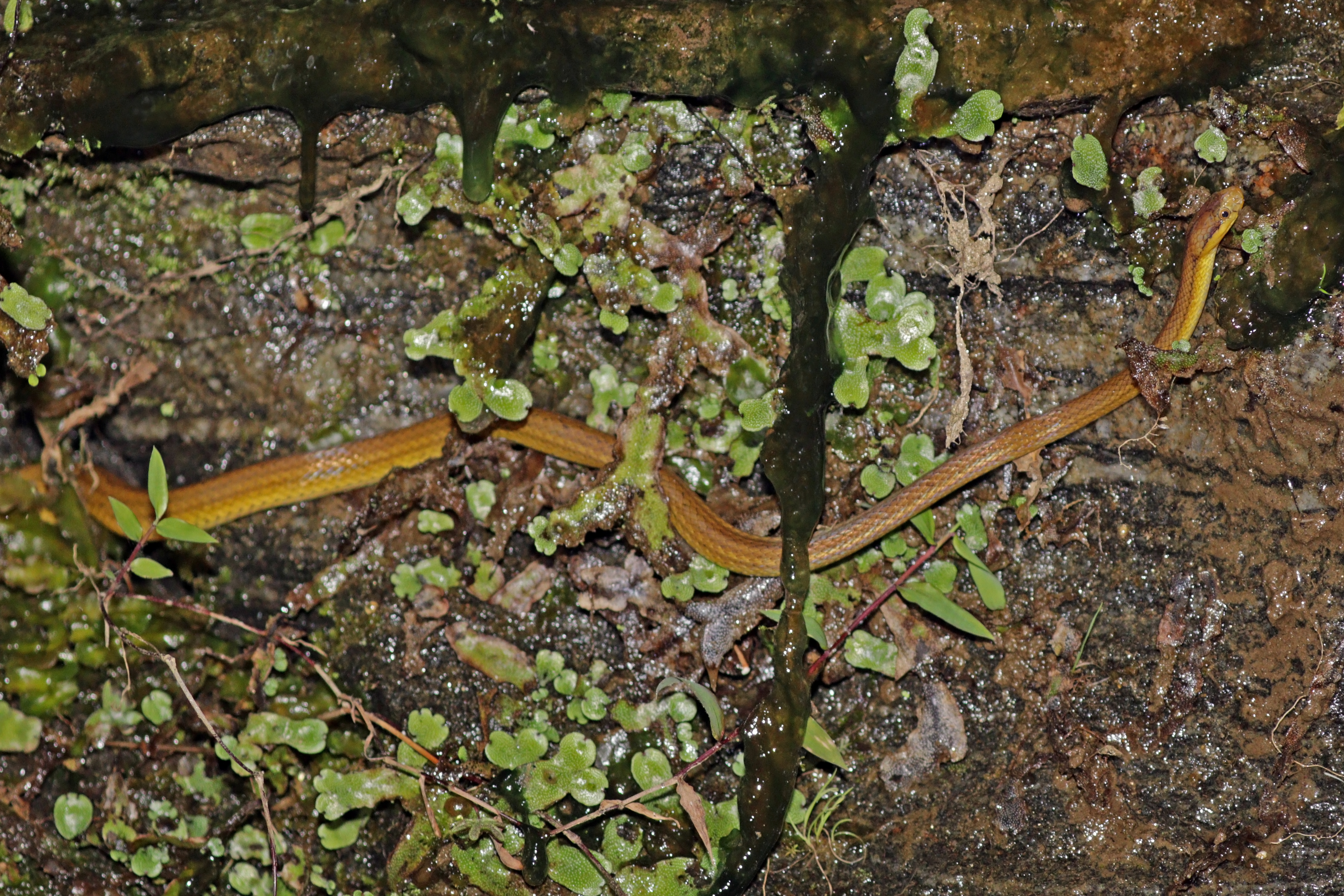
C. laphystius, Ranomafana National Park, Madagascar

Compsophis is a genus of harmless snakes in the family Pseudoxyrhophiidae. The genus is found only on the island of Madagascar.

== Species ==
Seven species are recognized as being valid.

- Compsophis albiventris Mocquard, 1894
- Compsophis boulengeri (Peracca, 1892)
- Compsophis fatsibe (Mercurio & Andreone, 2005)
- Compsophis infralineatus (Günther, 1882)
- Compsophis laphystius (Cadle, 1996)
- Compsophis vinckei (Domergue, 1988)
- Compsophis zeny (Cadle, 1996)

Nota bene: A binomial authority in parentheses indicates that the species was originally described in a genus other than Compsophis.

== Etymology ==
The specific name, boulengeri, is in honor of Belgian-born British herpetologist George Albert Boulenger.
