= Brygophis =

Conservation status
- Vulnerable (IUCN 3.1)

Scientific classification
- Kingdom: Animalia
- Phylum: Chordata
- Class: Reptilia
- Order: Squamata
- Suborder: Serpentes
- Family: Pseudoxyrhophiidae
- Genus: Brygophis; Domergue & Bour, 1989
- Species: B. coulangesi

Binomial name
- Brygophis coulangesi (Domergue, 1988)

Synonyms
- Perinetia coulangesi Domergue, 1988; Brygophis coulangesi — Domergue & Bour, 1989 (nomen substitutum)

Genus of snakes

Brygophis is a genus of snake in the family Pseudoxyrhophiidae (subfamily Pseudoxyrhophiinae). The genus is monotypic, containing the sole species Brygophis coulangesi, which is endemic to Madagascar.

== Etymology ==
The generic name, Brygophis, is in honor of French herpetologist Édouard-Raoul Brygoo.

The specific name, coulangesi, is in honor of French epidemiologist Pierre Coulanges.

== Habitat ==
The preferred natural habitat of B. coulangesi is forest, at altitudes of 900–1,200 m (3,000–3,900 ft).

== Behavior ==
B. coulangesi is arboreal.

== Diet ==
B. coulangesi preys upon frogs and small mammals.

== Reproduction ==
B. coulangesi is oviparous.
