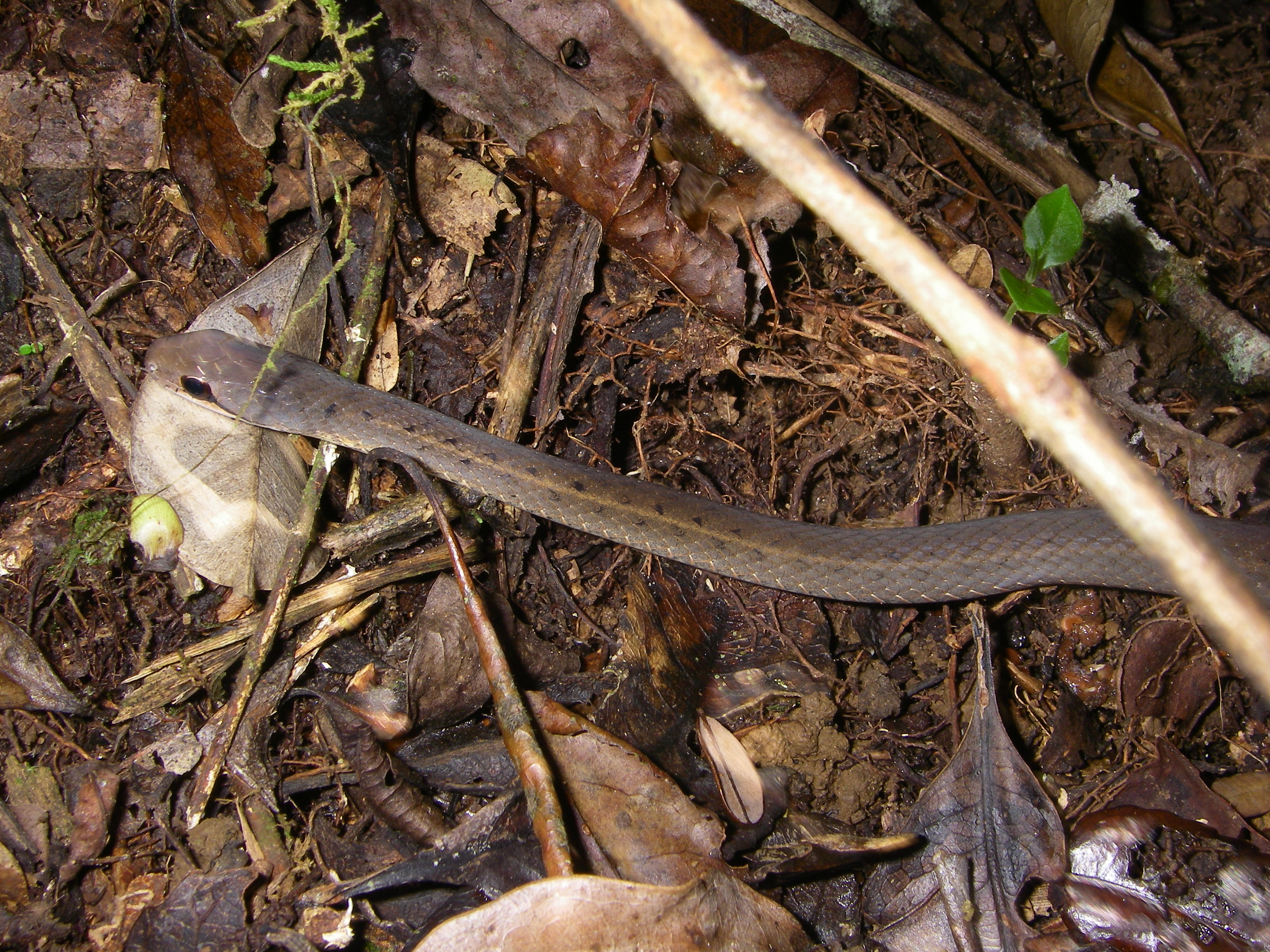
- Liophidium torquatum

Scientific classification
- Kingdom: Animalia
- Phylum: Chordata
- Class: Reptilia
- Order: Squamata
- Suborder: Serpentes
- Family: Pseudoxyrhophiidae
- Subfamily: Pseudoxyrhophiinae
- Genus: Liophidium; Boulenger, 1896

Species
- Ten recognized species, see article.

= Liophidium =

Genus of snakes

Liophidium is a genus of snakes in the family Pseudoxyrhophiidae. The genus contains ten species, nine of which are endemic to the island of Madagascar and one to the island of Mayotte. All species of Liophidium are harmless to humans.

== Species ==
The following species are recognized as being valid.

- Liophidium apperti Domergue, 1984
- Liophidium chabaudi Domergue, 1984
- Liophidium maintikibo Franzen, Jones, Raselimanana, Nagy, D’Cruze, Glaw & Vences, 2009
- Liophidium mayottensis (W. Peters, 1874) - Peters' brightsnake
- Liophidium pattoni Vieites, Ratsoavina, Randrianiaina, Nagy, Glaw & Vences, 2010
- Liophidium rhodogaster (Schlegel, 1837) - gold-collared snake
- Liophidium therezieni Domergue, 1984
- Liophidium torquatum (Boulenger, 1888)
- Liophidium trilineatum Boulenger, 1896 - Madagascar three-lined snake
- Liophidium vaillanti (Mocquard, 1901)

Nota bene: A binomial authority in parentheses indicates that the species was originally described in a genus other than Liophidium.
