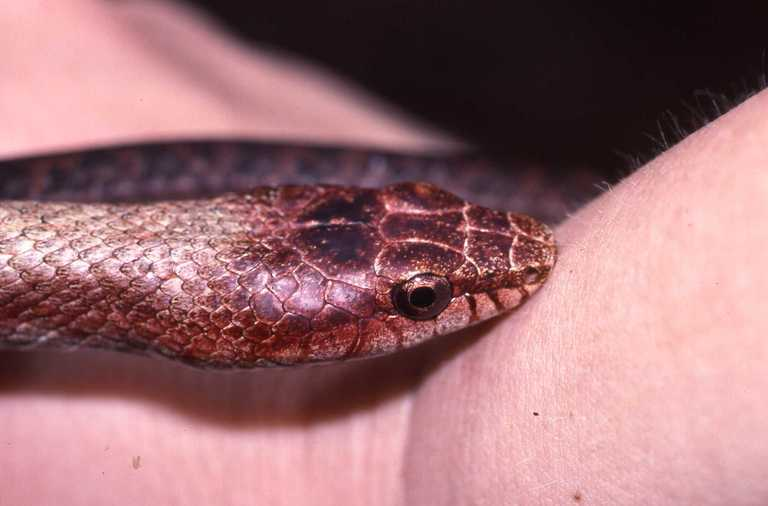
- Ithycyphus miniatus

Scientific classification
- Kingdom: Animalia
- Phylum: Chordata
- Class: Reptilia
- Order: Squamata
- Suborder: Serpentes
- Family: Pseudoxyrhophiidae
- Subfamily: Pseudoxyrhophiinae
- Genus: Ithycyphus; Günther, 1873

Species
- Five recognized species, see article.

= Ithycyphus =

Genus of snakes

Ithycyphus is a genus of venomous snakes in the family Pseudoxyrhophiidae. The genus is found only on the island of Madagascar. Species in the genus Ithycyphus are potentially harmful to humans (see Ithycyphus miniatus).

== Species ==
Five species are recognized as being valid.

- Ithycyphus blanci Domergue, 1988
- Ithycyphus goudoti (Schlegel, 1837) – forest night snake
- Ithycyphus miniatus (Schlegel, 1837) – cinnabar Malagasy night snake, cinnabar Malagasy vinesnake, tiny night snake
- Ithycyphus oursi Domergue, 1986 – Malagasy night snake
- Ithycyphus perineti Domergue, 1986 – Périnet night snake

Nota bene: A binomial authority in parentheses indicates that the species was originally described in a genus other than Ithycyphus.
