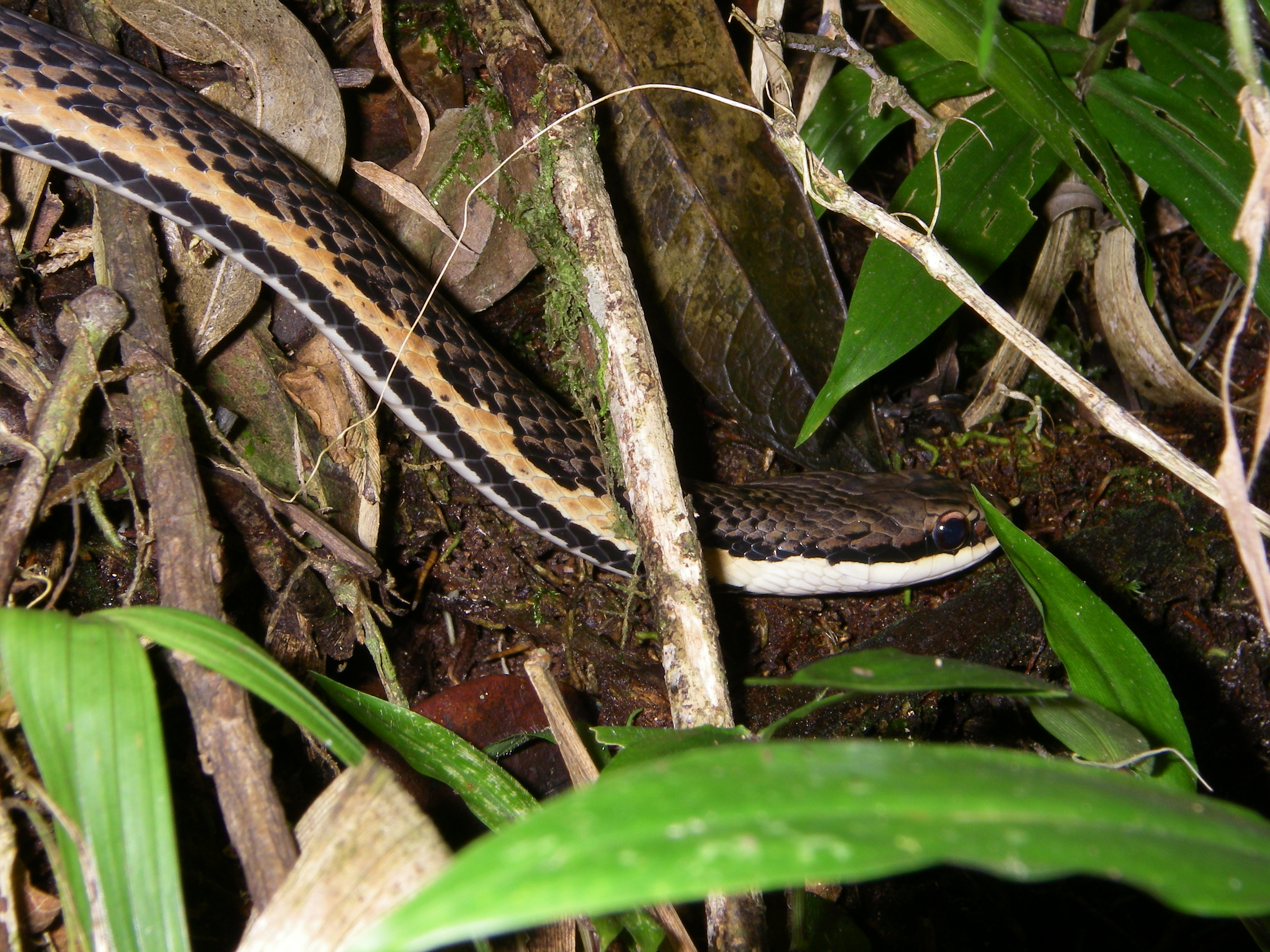
- Liopholidophis dolicocercus

Scientific classification
- Kingdom: Animalia
- Phylum: Chordata
- Class: Reptilia
- Order: Squamata
- Suborder: Serpentes
- Family: Pseudoxyrhophiidae
- Subfamily: Pseudoxyrhophiinae
- Genus: Liopholidophis; Mocquard, 1904

Species
- Eight species, see article.

= Liopholidophis =

Genus of snakes

Liopholidophis is a genus of snakes in the family Pseudoxyrhophiidae. The genus is endemic to the island of Madagascar.

== Species ==
Eight species are currently recognized as being valid.

- Liopholidophis baderi Glaw, Kucharzewski, Nagy, Hawlitschek & Vences, 2013
- Liopholidophis dimorphus Glaw, Nagy, Franzen & Vences, 2007
- Liopholidophis dolicocercus (Peracca, 1892)
- Liopholidophis grandidieri Mocquard, 1904 – Grandidier's water snake
- Liopholidophis oligolepis Glaw, Kucharzewski, Nagy, Hawlitschek & Vences, 2013
- Liopholidophis rhadinaea J. Cadle, 1996
- Liopholidophis sexlineatus (Günther, 1882) – six-lined water snake
- Liopholidophis varius (Fischer, 1884)

Nota bene: A binomial authority in parentheses indicates that the species was originally described in a genus other than Liopholidophis.
