= Micropisthodon =

Conservation status
- Least Concern (IUCN 3.1)

Scientific classification
- Kingdom: Animalia
- Phylum: Chordata
- Class: Reptilia
- Order: Squamata
- Suborder: Serpentes
- Family: Pseudoxyrhophiidae
- Genus: Micropisthodon; Mocquard, 1894
- Species: M. ochraceus

Binomial name
- Micropisthodon ochraceus Mocquard, 1894

Genus of snakes

Micropisthodon is a monotypic genus created for the poorly-known rear-fanged snake species, Micropisthodon ochraceus, found in eastern Madagascar. No subspecies are currently recognized.

== Description ==
Maximum recorded length is 70 cm (28 in). Back is brownish, with alternating dark and light areas, and the dark areas sometimes forming chevrons. Dentition is apparently aglyphous. Pupils are circular.

The species is oviparous. One dissected female contained 10 small eggs.

== Habitat and conservation ==
Micropisthodon ochraceus lives in low-elevation humid forest at elevations of 10–950 m (33–3,117 ft) above sea level, perhaps higher; it does not occur in disturbed habitats. It is arboreal.

It is a locally common species, but the population is probably declining because of habitat loss and degradation caused by open cast mining, conversion of land for agriculture, and logging. It occurs in several protected areas.
