= Phisalixella =

Scientific classification
- Kingdom: Animalia
- Phylum: Chordata
- Order: Squamata
- Suborder: Serpentes
- Family: Pseudoxyrhophiidae
- Subfamily: Pseudoxyrhophiinae
- Genus: Phisalixella; Domergue, 1995

Species
- Three recognized species, see article.

Genus of snakes

Phisalixella is a genus of pseudoxyrhophiid snakes endemic to the island of Madagascar. They are harmless to humans.

== Species ==
Three species are currently recognized.

- Phisalixella arctifasciatus (Duméril, Bibron, & Duméril, 1854)
- Phisalixella tulearensis (Domergue, 1995)
- Phisalixella variabilis (Boulenger, 1896)
