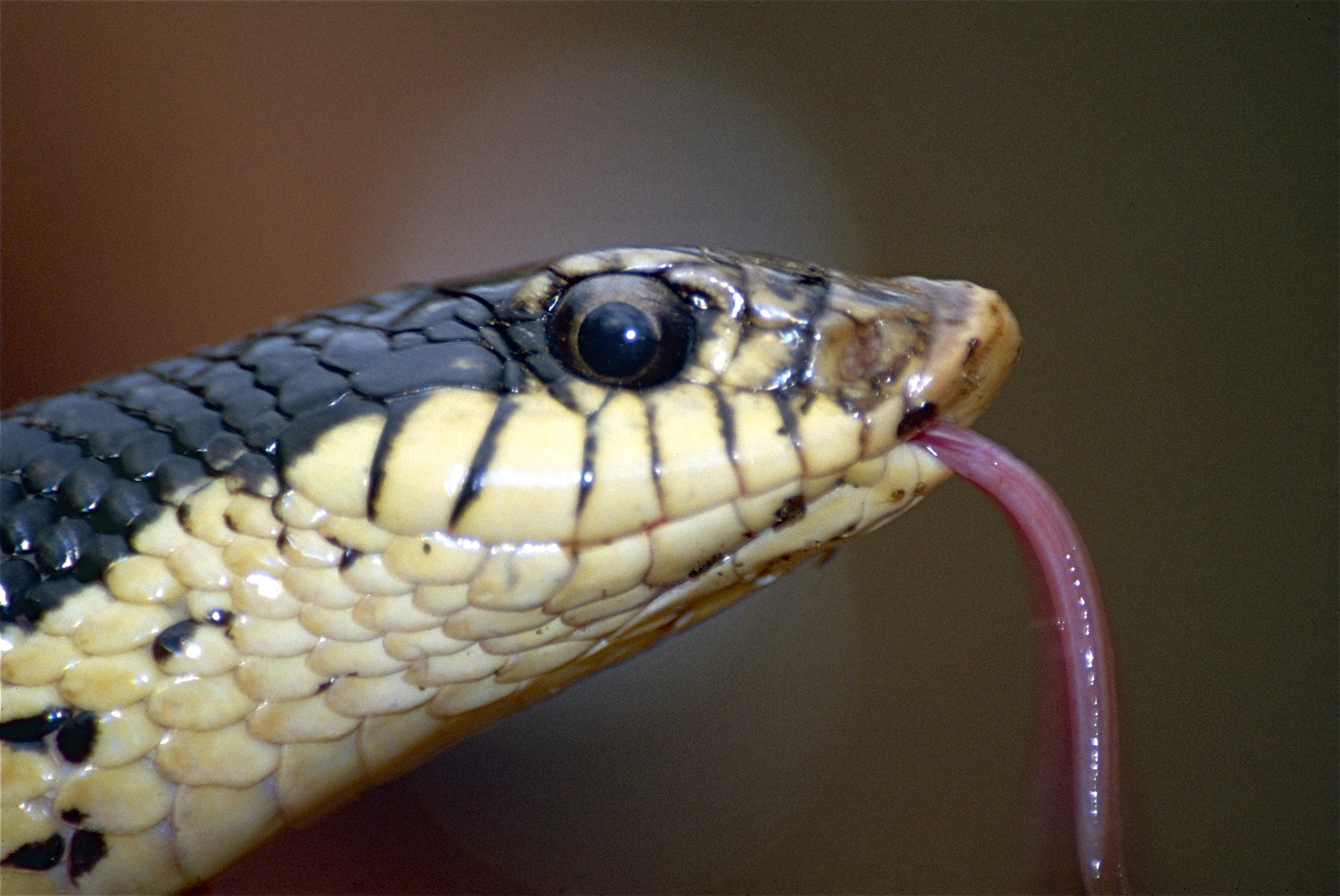
- Giant Malagasy hognose snake Leioheterodon madagascariensis

Scientific classification
- Kingdom: Animalia
- Phylum: Chordata
- Class: Reptilia
- Order: Squamata
- Suborder: Serpentes
- Superfamily: Elapoidea
- Family: Pseudoxyrhophiidae; Dowling, 1975

Genera
- About 22, see text

= Pseudoxyrhophiidae =

Subfamily of snakes

The Pseudoxyrhophiidae is a family of elapoid snakes, found mostly in Madagascar. They were formerly placed as a subfamily of the Lamprophiidae, but have been more recently identified as a distinct family.

It contains about 22 genera in two subfamilies:

- Amplorhininae Meirte, 1992
  - Amplorhinus A. Smith, 1847
  - Ditypophis Günther, 1881
  - Duberria Fitzinger, 1826
- Pseudoxyrhophiinae Dowling, 1975
  - Alluaudina Mocquard, 1894
  - Brygophis Domergue & Bour, 1989
  - Compsophis Mocquard, 1894
  - Dromicodryas Boulenger, 1893
  - Elapotinus Jan, 1862
  - Heteroliodon Boettger, 1913
  - Ithycyphus Günther, 1873
  - Langaha Bonnaterre, 1790
  - Leioheterodon Boulenger, 1893
  - Liophidium Boulenger, 1896
  - Liopholidophis Mocquard, 1904
  - Lycodryas Günther, 1879
  - Madagascarophis Mertens, 1952
  - Micropisthodon Mocquard, 1894
  - Pararhadinaea Boettger, 1898
  - Parastenophis Domergue, 1995
  - Phisalixella Domergue, 1995
  - Pseudoxyrhopus Günther, 1881
  - Thamnosophis Jan, 1863
