= List of reptile genera =

List of reptile genera lists the vertebrate class of reptiles by living genus, spanning two subclasses.

== Subclass Anapsida ==
=== Order Testudinata (turtles) ===
Turtles are reptiles of the order Testudines characterized by a special bony or cartilaginous shell developed from their ribs and acting as a shield.

==== Suborder Pleurodira ====
- Superfamily Cheloides
  - Family Chelidae
    - Genus Acanthochelys
    - Genus Chelodina
    - Genus Chelus - mata mata
    - Genus Elseya
    - Genus Elusor - Mary River turtle
    - Genus Emydura
    - Genus Flaviemys - Manning River snapping turtle
    - Genus Hydromedusa
    - Genus Mesoclemmys
    - Genus Myuchelys
    - Genus Phrynops
    - Genus Platemys - twist-necked turtle
    - Genus Pseudemydura - western swamp turtle
    - Genus Ranacephala - Hoge's side-necked turtle
    - Genus Rheodytes
    - Genus Rhinemys - red side-necked turtle
- Superfamily Pelomedusoides
  - Family Pelomedusidae
    - Genus Pelomedusa - African helmeted turtle
    - Genus Pelusios
  - Family Podocnemididae
    - Genus Erymnochelys - Madagascan big-headed turtle
    - Genus Peltocephalus - big-headed Amazon River turtle
    - Genus Podocnemis

==== Suborder Cryptodira ====
- Clade Americhelydia
  - Family Chelydridae
    - Genus Chelydra
    - Genus Macrochelys
- Superfamily Chelonioidea
  - Family Cheloniidae
    - Genus Caretta - loggerhead sea turtle
    - Genus Chelonia - green sea turtle
    - Genus Eretmochelys - hawksbill sea turtle
    - Genus Lepidochelys - ridley sea turtle
    - Genus Natator - flatback sea turtle
  - Family Dermochelyidae
    - Genus Dermochelys - leatherback sea turtle
- Superfamily Kinosternoidea
  - Family Dermatemydidae
    - Genus Dermatemys - Central American river turtle
  - Family Kinosternidae
    - Genus Claudius - narrow-bridged musk turtle
    - Genus Kinosternon
    - Genus Staurotypus
    - Genus Sternotherus
- Superfamily Testudinoidea
  - Family Emydidae
    - Genus Actinemys
    - Genus Clemmys - spotted turtle
    - Genus Chrysemys
    - Genus Deirochelys - chicken turtle
    - Genus Emydoidea - Blanding's turtle
    - Genus Emys
    - Genus Glyptemys
    - Genus Graptemys
    - Genus Malaclemys - diamondback terrapin
    - Genus Pseudemys
    - Genus Terrapene - box turtle
    - Genus Trachemys
  - Family Geoemydidae
    - Genus Batagur - including part of Kachuga
    - Genus Cuora - Asian box turtle
    - Genus Cyclemys
    - Genus Geoclemys - black pond turtle
    - Genus Geoemyda
    - Genus Hardella - brahminy river turtle
    - Genus Heosemys - formerly in Geoemyda
    - Genus Leucocephalon - Sulawesi forest turtle, formerly in Geoemyda and Heosemys
    - Genus Malayemys
    - Genus Mauremys - including Annamemys, Cathaiemys and Emmenia
    - Genus Melanochelys
    - Genus Morenia
    - Genus Notochelys - Malayan flat-shelled turtle
    - Genus Orlitia - Malaysian giant turtle
    - Genus Pangshura - formerly in Kachuga
    - Genus Rhinoclemmys
    - Genus Sacalia
    - Genus Siebenrockiella - formerly under Heosemys
    - Genus Vijayachelys - cane turtle, formerly in Geoemyda and Heosemys
  - FamilyPlatysternidae
    - Genus Platysternon
  - Family Testudinidae - tortoise
    - Genus Aldabrachelys
    - Genus Astrochelys
    - Genus Centrochelys
    - Genus Chelonoidis
    - Genus Chersina - angulate tortoise
    - Genus Chersobius
    - Genus Geochelone
    - Genus Gopherus
    - Genus Homopus
    - Genus Indotestudo
    - Genus Kinixys
    - Genus Malacochersus - pancake tortoise
    - Genus Manouria
    - Genus Psammobates
    - Genus Pyxis
    - Genus Stigmochelys - leopard tortoise
    - Genus Testudo
- Superfamily Trionychia
  - Family Carettochelyidae
    - Genus Carettochelys - pig-nosed turtle
  - Family Trionychidae
    - Genus Amyda
    - Genus Apalone
    - Genus Chitra
    - Genus Cyclanorbis
    - Genus Cycloderma
    - Genus Dogania - Malayan softshell turtle
    - Genus Lissemys
    - Genus Nilssonia
    - Genus Palea - wattle-necked softshell turtle
    - Genus Pelochelys
    - Genus Pelodiscus
    - Genus Rafetus
    - Genus Trionyx

== Subclass Diapsida ==
=== Superorder Lepidosauria ===
The Lepidosauria (from Greek meaning scaled lizards) are reptiles with overlapping scales. This subclass includes Squamata and Rhynchocephalia. It is a monophyletic group and therefore contains all descendants of a common ancestor.

==== Order Rhynchocephalia ====
Rhynchocephalia is an order of lizard-like reptiles that includes only one living species of tuatara, which in turn has two subspecies (Sphenodon punctatus punctatus and Sphenodon punctatus guntheri), which only inhabit parts of New Zealand.

- Family Sphenodontidae
  - Genus Sphenodon - tuatara

==== Order Squamata ====
Squamata is the largest order of reptiles, comprising lizards, snakes and amphisbaenians (worm lizards), which are collectively known as squamates or scaled reptiles. With over 10,000 species,

Approximate world distribution of snakes.

- Suborder Anguimorpha
  - Family Anguidae
    - Genus Abronia
    - Genus Anguis
    - Genus Dopasia
    - Genus Elgaria
    - Genus Gerrhonotus
    - Genus Hyalosaurus - Koelliker's glass lizard
    - Genus Ophisaurus
    - Genus Pseudopus
  - Family Anniellidae
    - Genus Anniella - American legless lizard
  - Family Diploglossidae
    - Genus Celestus
    - Genus Diploglossus
    - Genus Ophiodes
  - Family Helodermatidae
    - Genus Heloderma
  - Family Lanthanotidae
    - Genus Lanthanotus
  - Family Shinisauridae
    - Genus Shinisaurus
  - Family Varanidae
    - Genus Varanus - monitor lizard
  - Family Xenosauridae.
    - Genus Xenosaurus
- Infraorder Gekkota
  - Family Dibamidae
    - Genus Anelytropsis
    - Genus Dibamus
  - Family Gekkonidae
    - Genus Afroedura
    - Genus Afrogecko
    - Genus Agamura
    - Genus Ailuronyx
    - Genus Alsophylax
    - Genus Altiphylax
    - Genus Ancylodactylus
    - Genus Bauerius
    - Genus Blaesodactylus
    - Genus Bunopus
    - Genus Calodactylodes
    - Genus Chondrodactylus
    - Genus Christinus
    - Genus Cnemaspis
    - Genus Crossobamon
    - Genus Cryptactites - Peringuey's leaf-toed gecko
    - Genus Cyrtodactylus
    - Genus Cyrtopodion
    - Genus Dixonius
    - Genus Dravidogecko
    - Genus Ebenavia
    - Genus Elasmodactylus
    - Genus Geckolepis
    - Genus Gehyra
    - Genus Gekko
    - Genus Goggia
    - Genus Hemidactylus
    - Genus Hemiphyllodactylus
    - Genus Heteronotia
    - Genus Homopholis
    - Genus Kolekanos
    - Genus Lakigecko
    - Genus Lepidodactylus
    - Genus Luperosaurus
    - Genus Lygodactylus
    - Genus Matoatoa
    - Genus Mediodactylus
    - Genus Microgecko
    - Genus Nactus
    - Genus Narudasia
    - Genus Pachydactylus
    - Genus Paragehyra
    - Genus Paroedura
    - Genus Parsigecko - Ziaie's Pars-gecko
    - Genus Perochirus
    - Genus Phelsuma
    - Genus Pseudoceramodactylus - Gulf short-fingered gecko
    - Genus Pseudogekko
    - Genus Ptenopus
    - Genus Ptychozoon
    - Genus Ramigekko - Swartberg African leaf-toed gecko
    - Genus Rhinogekko
    - Genus Rhoptropella - Namaqua day gecko
    - Genus Rhoptropus
    - Genus Stenodactylus
    - Genus Tenuidactylus
    - Genus Trachydactylus
    - Genus Trigonodactylus
    - Genus Tropiocolotes
    - Genus Urocotyledon
    - Genus Uroplatus
  - Family Pygopodidae
    - Genus Aprasia
    - Genus Delma
    - Genus Lialis
    - Genus Ophidiocephalus - bronzeback snake-lizard
    - Genus Paradelma - brigalow scaly-foot
    - Genus Pletholax - slender slider
    - Genus Pygopus
- Suborder Iguania
  - Family Agamidae
    - Genus Acanthocercus
    - Genus Acanthosaura - mountain horned dragons
    - Genus Agama
    - Genus Amphibolurus - lashtail dragons
    - Genus Aphaniotis
    - Genus Bronchocela
    - Genus Bufoniceps - Laungwala long-headed lizard
    - Genus Calotes
    - Genus Ceratophora
    - Genus Chelosania - ring-tailed dragon
    - Genus Chlamydosaurus - frilled-neck lizard
    - Genus Complicitus - blackthroated bloodsucker
    - Genus Cophotis
    - Genus Coryphophylax
    - Genus Cristidorsa
    - Genus Cryptagama - gravel dragon
    - Genus Ctenophorus - comb-bearing dragons
    - Genus Dendragama
    - Genus Diploderma
    - Genus Diporiphora - two-lined dragons
    - Genus Draco - 'flying' lizards or gliding lizards
    - Genus Gonocephalus
    - Genus Gowidon
    - Genus Harpesaurus
    - Genus Hydrosaurus
    - Genus Hypsicalotes
    - Genus Hypsilurus - rainforest dragons
    - Genus Intellagama - Australian water dragon, formerly placed in Physignathus
    - Genus Japalura
    - Genus Laudakia
    - Genus Leiolepis
    - Genus Lophocalotes
    - Genus Lophognathus - sometimes placed in Amphibolurus
    - Genus Lophosaurus - forest dragons
    - Genus Lyriocephalus - hump-nosed lizard, lyreshead lizard
    - Genus Malayodracon
    - Genus Mantheyus
    - Genus Microauris
    - Genus Mictopholis - see Pseudocalotes
    - Genus Moloch - thorny devil
    - Genus Monilesaurus
    - Genus Otocryptis
    - Genus Paralaudakia - sometimes included in Laudakia
    - Genus Pelturagonia
    - Genus Phoxophrys
    - Genus Phrynocephalus
    - Genus Physignathus - water dragons
    - Genus Pogona - bearded dragons
    - Genus Psammophilus
    - Genus Pseudocalotes
    - Genus Pseudocophotis
    - Genus Pseudotrapelus
    - Genus Ptyctolaemus
    - Genus Rankinia - heath dragon
    - Genus Saara
    - Genus Salea
    - Genus Sarada - large fan-throated lizards
    - Genus Sitana - fan-throated lizards
    - Genus Trapelus
    - Genus Tropicagama
    - Genus Tympanocryptis - earless dragons
    - Genus Uromastyx
    - Genus Xenagama
  - Family Chamaeleonidae - chameleon
    - Genus Archaius
    - Genus Bradypodion
    - Genus Brookesia
    - Genus Calumma
    - Genus Chamaeleo
    - Genus Furcifer
    - Genus Kinyongia
    - Genus Nadzikambia
    - Genus Palleon
    - Genus Rieppeleon
    - Genus Rhampholeon
    - Genus Trioceros
  - Family Corytophanidae
    - Genus Basiliscus
    - Genus Corytophanes
    - Genus Laemanctus
  - Family Crotaphytidae
    - Genus Crotaphytus
    - Genus Gambelia
  - Family Hoplocercidae
    - Genus Enyalioides
    - Genus Hoplocercus - weapontail
    - Genus Morunasaurus
  - Family Iguanidae
    - Genus Amblyrhynchus - marine iguana
    - Genus Brachylophus
    - Genus Cachryx
    - Genus Conolophus
    - Genus Ctenosaura
    - Genus Cyclura
    - Genus Dipsosaurus - desert iguana
    - Genus Iguana
    - Genus Sauromalus - chuckwalla
  - Family Leiosauridae
    - Genus Anisolepis
    - Genus Diplolaemus
    - Genus Enyalius
    - Genus Leiosaurus
    - Genus Pristidactylus
    - Genus Urostrophus
  - Family Liolaemidae
    - Genus Ctenoblepharys
    - Genus Liolaemus
    - Genus Phymaturus
  - Family Opluridae
    - Genus Chalarodon
    - Genus Oplurus
  - Family Phrynosomatidae
    - Genus Callisaurus - zebra-tailed lizard
    - Genus Cophosaurus - greater earless lizard
    - Genus Holbrookia
    - Genus Petrosaurus - California rock lizard
    - Genus Phrynosoma - horned lizard
    - Genus Sceloporus - spiny lizard
    - Genus Uma - fringe-toed lizard
    - Genus Urosaurus
    - Genus Uta - side-blotched lizard
  - Family Polychrotidae
    - Genus Polychrus
  - Family Tropiduridae
    - Genus Eurolophosaurus
    - Genus Microlophus
    - Genus Plica
    - Genus Stenocercus
    - Genus Strobilurus
    - Genus Tropidurus
    - Genus Uracentron - sometimes in Tropidurus
    - Genus Uranoscodon
- Superfamily Lacertoidea
  - Family Alopoglossidae - recently split from the Gymnophthalmidae
    - Genus Alopoglossus
    - Genus Ptychoglossus
  - Family Amphisbaenidae
    - Genus Amphisbaena - worm lizard
    - Genus Ancylocranium
    - Genus Baikia - West African worm lizard
    - Genus Chirindia
    - Genus Cynisca
    - Genus Dalophia
    - Genus Geocalamus
    - Genus Leposternon
    - Genus Loveridgea
    - Genus Mesobaena
    - Genus Monopeltis
    - Genus Zygaspis
  - Family Bipedidae
    - Genus Bipes
  - Family Blanidae
    - Genus Blanus
  - Family Cadeidae
    - Genus Cadea
  - Family Gymnophthalmidae
    - Genus Acratosaura
    - Genus Adercosaurus
    - Genus Alexandresaurus
    - Genus Amapasaurus - four-toed amapasaurus
    - Genus Anadia
    - Genus Andinosaura
    - Genus Anotosaura
    - Genus Arthrosaura
    - Genus Bachia
    - Genus Calyptommatus
    - Genus Caparaonia
    - Genus Centrosaura
    - Genus Cercosaura
    - Genus Colobodactylus
    - Genus Colobosaura
    - Genus Colobosauroides
    - Genus Dendrosauridion
    - Genus Dryadosaura
    - Genus Echinosaura
    - Genus Ecpleopus
    - Genus Euspondylus
    - Genus Gelanesaurus
    - Genus Gymnophthalmus
    - Genus Heterodactylus
    - Genus Iphisa
    - Genus Kaieteurosaurus
    - Genus Kataphraktosaurus
    - Genus Leposoma
    - Genus Loxopholis
    - Genus Macropholidus
    - Genus Magdalenasaura
    - Genus Marinussaurus
    - Genus Micrablepharus
    - Genus Neusticurus
    - Genus Nothobachia
    - Genus Oreosaurus
    - Genus Pantepuisaurus
    - Genus Petracola
    - Genus Pholidobolus
    - Genus Placosoma
    - Genus Potamites
    - Genus Procellosaurinus
    - Genus Proctoporus
    - Genus Psilops
    - Genus Rhachisaurus
    - Genus Rheosaurus
    - Genus Riama
    - Genus Riolama
    - Genus Rondonops
    - Genus Scriptosaura
    - Genus Selvasaura
    - Genus Stenolepis
    - Genus Tretioscincus
    - Genus Vanzosaura
    - Genus Wilsonosaura
    - Genus Yanomamia
  - Family Lacertidae
    - Genus Acanthodactylus
    - Genus Adolfus
    - Genus Algyroides
    - Genus Anatololacerta
    - Genus Apathya
    - Genus Archaeolacerta - Bedriaga's rock lizard
    - Genus Atlantolacerta - Atlas dwarf lizard
    - Genus Australolacerta - southern rock lizard
    - Genus Congolacerta
    - Genus Dalmatolacerta - sharp-snouted rock lizard
    - Genus Darevskia
    - Genus Dinarolacerta
    - Genus Eremias
    - Genus Gallotia
    - Genus Gastropholis
    - Genus Heliobolus
    - Genus Hellenolacerta - Greek rock lizard
    - Genus Holaspis
    - Genus Iberolacerta
    - Genus Ichnotropis
    - Genus Iranolacerta
    - Genus Lacerta
    - Genus Latastia
    - Genus Meroles
    - Genus Mesalina
    - Genus Nucras
    - Genus Omanosaura
    - Genus Ophisops
    - Genus Parvilacerta
    - Genus Pedioplanis
    - Genus Philochortus
    - Genus Phoenicolacerta
    - Genus Podarcis
    - Genus Poromera
    - Genus Psammodromus
    - Genus Pseuderemias
    - Genus Scelarcis - Moroccan rock lizard
    - Genus Takydromus
    - Genus Teira - Madeiran wall lizard
    - Genus Timon
    - Genus Tropidosaura
    - Genus Vhembelacerta - Soutpansberg rock lizard
    - Genus Zootoca - viviparous lizard
  - Family Rhineuridae
    - Genus Rhineura
  - Family Teiidae
    - Genus Ameiva
    - Genus Ameivula
    - Genus Aspidoscelis
    - Genus Aurivela
    - Genus Callopistes
    - Genus Cnemidophorus
    - Genus Contomastix
    - Genus Crocodilurus
    - Genus Dicrodon
    - Genus Dracaena
    - Genus Glaucomastix
    - Genus Holcosus
    - Genus Kentropyx
    - Genus Medopheos - Bocourt's ameiva
    - Genus Pholidoscelis
    - Genus Salvator
    - Genus Teius
    - Genus Tupinambis
  - Family Trogonophidae.
    - Genus Agamodon
    - Genus Diplometopon - Zarudny's worm lizard
    - Genus Pachycalamus - short worm lizard
    - Genus Trogonophis - checkerboard worm lizard
- Infraorder Scincomorpha
  - Family Cordylidae
    - Genus Chamaesaura
    - Genus Cordylus
    - Genus Hemicordylus
    - Genus Karusasaurus
    - Genus Namazonurus
    - Genus Ninurta
    - Genus Ouroborus - armadillo girdled lizard
    - Genus Platysaurus
    - Genus Pseudocordylus
    - Genus Smaug
  - Family Gerrhosauridae
    - Genus Broadleysaurus - Sudan plated lizard
    - Genus Cordylosaurus - blue-black plated lizard
    - Genus Gerrhosaurus
    - Genus Matobosaurus
    - Genus Tetradactylus
    - Genus Tracheloptychus - keeled plated lizards
    - Genus Zonosaurus
  - Family Scincidae
    - Genus Egernia
    - Genus Lygosoma
    - Genus Parotosaurus - see Sphenomorphus
    - Genus Sphenomorphus
    - Genus Tiliqua - blue-tongued skink
  - Family Xantusiidae - night lizard
    - Genus Cricosaura - Cuban night lizard
    - Genus Lepidophyma
    - Genus Xantusia
- Suborder Serpentes - snakes
  - Infraorder Alethinophidia
    - Family Acrochordidae
      - Genus Acrochordus
    - Family Aniliidae
      - Genus Anilius
    - Family Anomochilidae
      - Genus Anomochilus
    - Family Atractaspididae
      - Genus Amblyodipsas
      - Genus Aparallactus
      - Genus Atractaspis
      - Genus Brachyophis
      - Genus Chilorhinophis
      - Genus Homoroselaps
      - Genus Hypoptophis
      - Genus Macrelaps
      - Genus Micrelaps
      - Genus Poecilopholis
      - Genus Polemon
      - Genus Xenocalamus
    - Family Boidae
      - Genus Acrantophis
      - Genus Boa
      - Genus Calabaria - Calabar python
      - Genus Candoia
      - Genus Charina
      - Genus Chilabothrus
      - Genus Corallus
      - Genus Epicrates
      - Genus Eryx
      - Genus Eunectes
      - Genus Lichanura
      - Genus Sanzinia
    - Family Bolyeriidae,
      - Genus Bolyeria - Round Island burrowing boa
      - Genus Casarea - Round Island boa
    - Family Colubridae
      - Genus Adelophis
      - Genus Adelphicos
      - Genus Adelphostigma
      - Genus Aeluroglena
      - Genus Afronatrix - African brown water snake
      - Genus Ahaetulla
      - Genus Alsophis
      - Genus Amastridium
      - Genus Amnesteophis
      - Genus Amnisiophis
      - Genus Amphiesma - buff striped keelback
      - Genus Amphiesmoides
      - Genus Anoplohydrus
      - Genus Apographon
      - Genus Apostolepis
      - Genus Aprosdoketophis
      - Genus Arcanumophis
      - Genus Archelaphe
      - Genus Argyrogena
      - Genus Arizona
      - Genus Arrhyton
      - Genus Aspidura
      - Genus Atractus
      - Genus Atretium
      - Genus Baliodryas
      - Genus Bamanophis
      - Genus Blythia
      - Genus Bogertophis
      - Genus Boiga
      - Genus Boiruna
      - Genus Borikenophis
      - Genus Caaeteboia - Amaral's ground snake
      - Genus Calamaria
      - Genus Calamodontophis
      - Genus Calamorhabdium
      - Genus Caraiba
      - Genus Carphophis
      - Genus Cemophora
      - Genus Cenaspis
      - Genus Cercophis - Schlegel's golden snake
      - Genus Chapinophis
      - Genus Chersodromus
      - Genus Chironius
      - Genus Chlorosoma
      - Genus Chrysopelea
      - Genus Clelia - Mussurana
      - Genus Clonophis - Kirtland's snake
      - Genus Coelognathus
      - Genus Collorhabdium
      - Genus Coluber - eastern racer
      - Genus Colubroelaps - Nguyenvansang's snake
      - Genus Coniophanes
      - Genus Conophis
      - Genus Conopsis
      - Genus Contia
      - Genus Coronelaps
      - Genus Coronella
      - Genus Crisantophis - Dunn's road guarder
      - Genus Crotaphopeltis
      - Genus Cryophis - Hallberg's cloud forest snake
      - Genus Cubophis
      - Genus Dasypeltis
      - Genus Dendrelaphis
      - Genus Dendrophidion
      - Genus Diadophis - ring-necked snake
      - Genus Diaphorolepis
      - Genus Dipsadoboa
      - Genus Dipsas
      - Genus Dispholidus - boomslang
      - Genus Ditaxodon - Hensel's snake
      - Genus Dolichophis
      - Genus Drepanoides
      - Genus Drymarchon
      - Genus Drymobius
      - Genus Drymoluber
      - Genus Dryophiops
      - Genus Echinanthera
      - Genus Eirenis
      - Genus Elaphe
      - Genus Elapoidis
      - Genus Elapomorphus
      - Genus Emmochliophis
      - Genus Enuliophis - Colombian longtail snake
      - Genus Enulius
      - Genus Erythrolamprus
      - Genus Etheridgeum
      - Genus Euprepiophis
      - Genus Eutrachelophis
      - Genus Farancia
      - Genus Ficimia
      - Genus Fowlea
      - Genus Geagras - Tehuantepec striped snake
      - Genus Geophis
      - Genus Gomesophis - Brazilian burrowing snake
      - Genus Gongylosoma
      - Genus Gonyosoma
      - Genus Grayia
      - Genus Gyalopion
      - Genus Haitiophis - Hispaniola racer
      - Genus Haldea
      - Genus Hapsidophrys
      - Genus Hebius
      - Genus Helicops
      - Genus Helophis - Schouteden's sun snake
      - Genus Hemerophis
      - Genus Hemorrhois
      - Genus Herpetoreas
      - Genus Heterodon
      - Genus Hierophis
      - Genus Hydrablabes
      - Genus Hydraethiops
      - Genus Hydrodynastes
      - Genus Hydromorphus
      - Genus Hydrops
      - Genus Hypsiglena
      - Genus Hypsirhynchus
      - Genus Ialtris
      - Genus Iguanognathus - spatula-toothed snake
      - Genus Imantodes
      - Genus Incaspis
      - Genus Isanophis - Boonsong's stream snake
      - Genus Lampropeltis - kingsnake
      - Genus Leptodeira
      - Genus Leptodrymus
      - Genus Leptophis
      - Genus Limnophis
      - Genus Liodytes
      - Genus Lioheterophis - Ihering's snake
      - Genus Liopeltis
      - Genus Lycodon
      - Genus Lycognathophis - Seychelles wolf snake
      - Genus Lygophis
      - Genus Lytorhynchus
      - Genus Macrocalamus
      - Genus Macroprotodon
      - Genus Magliophis
      - Genus Manolepis - ridgehead snake
      - Genus Masticophis
      - Genus Mastigodryas
      - Genus Meizodon
      - Genus Mopanveldophis
      - Genus Muhtarophis
      - Genus Mussurana
      - Genus Natriciteres
      - Genus Natrix
      - Genus Nerodia
      - Genus Ninia
      - Genus Nothopsis - rough coffee snake
      - Genus Oligodon
      - Genus Omoadiphas
      - Genus Oocatochus
      - Genus Opheodrys
      - Genus Opisthotropis
      - Genus Oreocalamus
      - Genus Oreocryptophis
      - Genus Orientocoluber - slender racer
      - Genus Oxybelis
      - Genus Oxyrhopus
      - Genus Palusophis
      - Genus Pantherophis
      - Genus Paraphimophis
      - Genus Phalotris
      - Genus Philodryas
      - Genus Philothamnus
      - Genus Phimophis
      - Genus Phrynonax
      - Genus Phyllorhynchus
      - Genus Pituophis
      - Genus Plagiopholis
      - Genus Platyceps
      - Genus Plesiodipsas - Alemán's snail-eater
      - Genus Pliocercus
      - Genus Proahaetulla
      - Genus Pseudagkistrodon
      - Genus Pseudalsophis
      - Genus Pseudelaphe
      - Genus Pseudoboa
      - Genus Pseudoeryx
      - Genus Pseudoficimia
      - Genus Pseudoleptodeira - false cat-eyed snake
      - Genus Pseudorabdion
      - Genus Pseudotomodon - false tomodon snake
      - Genus Pseudoxenodon
      - Genus Psomophis
      - Genus Ptyas
      - Genus Ptychophis - fanged water snake
      - Genus Rabdion
      - Genus Regina
      - Genus Rhabdophis
      - Genus Rhabdops
      - Genus Rhachidelus
      - Genus Rhadinaea
      - Genus Rhadinella
      - Genus Rhadinophanes
      - Genus Rhamnophis
      - Genus Rhinobothryum
      - Genus Rhinocheilus
      - Genus Rhynchocalamus
      - Genus Rodriguesophis
      - Genus Salvadora
      - Genus Saphenophis
      - Genus Scaphiodontophis
      - Genus Scaphiophis
      - Genus Scolecophis
      - Genus Senticolis
      - Genus Sibon
      - Genus Sibynophis
      - Genus Simophis
      - Genus Siphlophis
      - Genus Smithophis
      - Genus Sonora
      - Genus Sordellina - dotted brown snake
      - Genus Spalerosophis
      - Genus Spilotes
      - Genus Stegonotus
      - Genus Stenorrhina
      - Genus Stichophanes
      - Genus Storeria
      - Genus Symphimus
      - Genus Sympholis
      - Genus Synophis
      - Genus Tachymenis
      - Genus Taeniophallus
      - Genus Tantalophis - Oaxacan cat-eyed snake
      - Genus Tantilla
      - Genus Tantillita
      - Genus Telescopus - Old World catsnakes
      - Genus Tetralepis - bluebelly Java snake
      - Genus Thamnodynastes
      - Genus Thamnophis - garter snake
      - Genus Thermophis
      - Genus Thelotornis - twig snake
      - Genus Thrasops
      - Genus Tomodon
      - Genus Toxicodryas
      - Genus Trachischium
      - Genus Tretanorhinus
      - Genus Trimerodytes
      - Genus Trimetopon
      - Genus Trimorphodon
      - Genus Tropidoclonion
      - Genus Tropidodipsas
      - Genus Tropidodryas
      - Genus Tropidonophis
      - Genus Uromacer
      - Genus Urotheca
      - Genus Virginia - smooth earth snake
      - Genus Wallaceophis
      - Genus Wallophis - Indian smooth snake
      - Genus Xenelaphis
      - Genus Xenochrophis
      - Genus Xenodon
      - Genus Xenopholis
      - Genus Xenoxybelis
      - Genus Xyelodontophis - dagger-tooth vine snake
      - Genus Zamenis
    - Family Cyclocoridae
      - Genus Cyclocorus
      - Genus Hologerrhum
      - Genus Levitonius
      - Genus Myersophis
      - Genus Oxyrhabdium
    - Family Cylindrophiidae
      - Genus Cylindrophis
    - Family Elapidae
      - Genus Acanthophis
      - Genus Aipysurus
      - Genus Antaioserpens
      - Genus Aspidelaps
      - Genus Aspidomorphus
      - Genus Austrelaps
      - Genus Boulengerina
      - Genus Brachyurophis
      - Genus Bungarus
      - Genus Cacophis
      - Genus Calliophis
      - Genus Cryptophis
      - Genus Demansia
      - Genus Dendroaspis - mamba
      - Genus Denisonia
      - Genus Drysdalia
      - Genus Echiopsis
      - Genus Elapognathus
      - Genus Elapsoidea
      - Genus Emydocephalus
      - Genus Enhydrina
      - Genus Ephalophis - Grey's mudsnake
      - Genus Furina (snake)
      - Genus Hemachatus - rinkhals
      - Genus Hemiaspis
      - Genus Hemibungarus
      - Genus Homoroselaps
      - Genus Hoplocephalus
      - Genus Hydrelaps
      - Genus Hydrophis
      - Genus Incongruelaps
      - Genus Laticauda - sea krait
      - Genus Loveridgelaps
      - Genus Micropechis
      - Genus Micruroides
      - Genus Micrurus
      - Genus Naja
      - Genus Neelaps
      - Genus Notechis - tiger snake
      - Genus Ogmodon - Fiji snake
      - Genus Ophiophagus - king cobra
      - Genus Oxyuranus - taipan
      - Genus Parahydrophis - northern mangrove seasnake
      - Genus Parapistocalamus
      - Genus Paroplocephalus
      - Genus Pseudechis
      - Genus Pseudohaje
      - Genus Pseudonaja
      - Genus Rhinoplocephalus
      - Genus Salomonelaps
      - Genus Simoselaps
      - Genus Sinomicrurus
      - Genus Suta
      - Genus Thalassophis - anomalous sea snake
      - Genus Toxicocalamus
      - Genus Tropidechis - rough-scaled snake
      - Genus Vermicella
      - Genus Walterinnesia
    - Family Homalopsidae
      - Genus Bitia - keel-bellied water snake
      - Genus Brachyorrhos
      - Genus Calamophis
      - Genus Cantoria
      - Genus Cerberus
      - Genus Dieurostus - Dussumier's water snake
      - Genus Djokoiskandarus
      - Genus Enhydris
      - Genus Erpeton
      - Genus Ferania - Siebold's water snake
      - Genus Fordonia
      - Genus Gerarda
      - Genus Gyiophis
      - Genus Heurnia
      - Genus Homalophis
      - Genus Homalopsis
      - Genus Hypsiscopus
      - Genus Karnsophis
      - Genus Kualatahan
      - Genus Mintonophis
      - Genus Miralia
      - Genus Myanophis
      - Genus Myron
      - Genus Myrrophis
      - Genus Phytolopsis
      - Genus Pseudoferania
      - Genus Raclitia
      - Genus Subsessor
      - Genus Sumatranus
    - Family Lamprophiidae
      - Genus Boaedon
      - Genus Bothrolycus - Günther's black snake
      - Genus Bothrophthalmus - red-black striped snake
      - Genus Buhoma
      - Genus Chamaelycus
      - Genus Dendrolycus - Cameroon rainforest snake
      - Genus Gonionotophis
      - Genus Gracililima - black file snake
      - Genus Hormonotus
      - Genus Inyoka
      - Genus Lamprophis
      - Genus Limaformosa
      - Genus Lycodonomorphus
      - Genus Lycophidion
      - Genus Mehelya
      - Genus Montaspis - cream-spotted mountain snake
      - Genus Pseudoboodon
    - Family Loxocemidae
      - Genus Loxocemus
    - Family Pareidae
      - Genus Aplopeltura
      - Genus Asthenodipsas
      - Genus Pareas
      - Genus Xylophis
    - Family Prosymnidae
      - Genus Prosymna
    - Family Psammophiidae
      - Genus Dipsina - Dwarf beaked snake
      - Genus Hemirhagerrhis
      - Genus Kladirostratus - Branch's beaked snak
      - Genus Malpolon
      - Genus Mimophis
      - Genus Psammophis
      - Genus Psammophylax
      - Genus Rhamphiophis
    - Family Pseudaspididae
      - Genus Psammodynastes
      - Genus Pseudaspis - Mole snake
      - Genus Pythonodipsas - western keeled snake
    - Family Pseudoxyrhophiidae
      - Genus Alluaudina
      - Genus Amplorhinus
      - Genus Brygophis
      - Genus Compsophis
      - Genus Ditypophis - Günther's racer
      - Genus Dromicodryas
      - Genus Duberria
      - Genus Elapotinus
      - Genus Heteroliodon
      - Genus Ithycyphus
      - Genus Langaha
      - Genus Leioheterodon
      - Genus Liophidium
      - Genus Liopholidophis
      - Genus Lycodryas
      - Genus Madagascarophis
      - Genus Micropisthodon
      - Genus Pararhadinaea
      - Genus Parastenophis
      - Genus Phisalixella
      - Genus Pseudoxyrhopus
      - Genus Thamnosophis
    - Family Pythonidae
      - Genus Antaresia
      - Genus Apodora
      - Genus Aspidites
      - Genus Bothrochilus - Bismarck ringed python
      - Genus Leiopython
      - Genus Liasis
      - Genus Malayopython
      - Genus Morelia
      - Genus Nyctophilopython - Oenpelli python
      - Genus Python
      - Genus Simalia
    - Family Tropidophiidae
      - Genus Trachyboa
      - Genus Tropidophis
    - Family Uropeltidae
      - Genus Melanophidium
      - Genus Platyplectrurus
      - Genus Pseudoplectrurus - Karnataka burrowing snake
      - Genus Plectrurus
      - Genus Rhinophis
      - Genus Teretrurus
      - Genus Uropeltis
    - Family Viperidae
      - Genus Agkistrodon - Moccasin
      - Genus Atheris - Bush viper
      - Genus Atropoides - Picado's jumping pitviper
      - Genus Azemiops - Fea's viper
      - Genus Bitis - Puff adder
      - Genus Bothriechis - Palm-pitviper
      - Genus Bothrocophias - Toadheaded pit viper
      - Genus Bothrops - Lanceheads
      - Genus Calloselasma - Malayan pitviper
      - Genus Causus - Night adder
      - Genus Cerastes - Horned viper
      - Genus Cerrophidion - Montane pitviper
      - Genus Craspedocephalus - Pit viper
      - Genus Crotalus - Rattlesnakes
      - Genus Daboia - Day adder
      - Genus Deinagkistrodon - Hundred-pace pitviper
      - Genus Echis - Saw-scaled viper
      - Genus Eristicophis - McMahon's viper
      - Genus Garthius
      - Genus Gloydius - Asian moccasin
      - Genus Hypnale - Hump-nosed pit viper
      - Genus Lachesis - Bushmaster
      - Genus Macrovipera
      - Genus Metlapilcoatlus - Jumping pitviper
      - Genus Mixcoatlus - Mexican pit viper
      - Genus Montatheris - Kenya mountain viper
      - Genus Montivipera - Upland viper
      - Genus Ophryacus - Mexican horned pitviper
      - Genus Ovophis - Mountain pit viper
      - Genus Porthidium - Hognose pit viper
      - Genus Proatheris - Lowland viper
      - Genus Protobothrops - Pit viper
      - Genus Pseudocerastes - False-horned viper
      - Genus Sistrurus - Ground rattlesnake
      - Genus Trimeresurus - Asian lancehead
      - Genus Tropidolaemus - Temple viper
      - Genus Vipera - Palearctic viper
    - Family Xenodermidae
      - Genus Achalinus
      - Genus Fimbrios
      - Genus Parafimbrios
      - Genus Paraxenodermus
      - Genus Stoliczkia
      - Genus Xenodermus
    - Family Xenopeltidae
      - Genus Xenopeltis
    - Family Xenophidiidae
      - Genus Xenophidion
  - Infraorder Scolecophidia
    - Family Anomalepidae
      - Genus Anomalepis
      - Genus Helminthophis
      - Genus Liotyphlops
      - Genus Typhlophis
    - Family Gerrhopilidae
      - Genus Gerrhopilus
      - Genus Cathetorhinus
    - Family Leptotyphlopidae
      - Genus Epacrophis
      - Genus Epictia
      - Genus Habrophallos - Collared blind snake
      - Genus Leptotyphlops
      - Genus Mitophis
      - Genus Myriopholis
      - Genus Namibiana
      - Genus Rena
      - Genus Rhinoguinea
      - Genus Rhinoleptus - Villiers's blind snake
      - Genus Siagonodon
      - Genus Tetracheilostoma
      - Genus Tricheilostoma
      - Genus Trilepida
    - Family Typhlopidae
      - Genus Acutotyphlops
      - Genus Afrotyphlops
      - Genus Amerotyphlops
      - Genus Anilios
      - Genus Antillotyphlops
      - Genus Argyrophis
      - Genus Cubatyphlops
      - Genus Cyclotyphlops - Deharveng's blind snake
      - Genus Grypotyphlops
      - Genus Indotyphlops
      - Genus Letheobia
      - Genus Madatyphlops
      - Genus Malayotyphlops
      - Genus Ramphotyphlops
      - Genus Rhinotyphlops
      - Genus Sundatyphlops
      - Genus Typhlops
      - Genus Xerotyphlops
    - Family Xenotyphlopidae.
      - Genus Xenotyphlops

=== Division Archosauria ===
Archosaurs are a group of diapsid amniotes whose living representatives consist of birds and crocodilians. This group also includes all extinct dinosaurs, extinct crocodilian relatives, and pterosaurs.

==== Order Crocodilia ====
Crocodilia (or Crocodylia) is an order of mostly large, predatory, semiaquatic archosaurian reptiles, known as crocodilians.

- Family Gavialidae
  - Genus Gavialis - gharial
  - Genus Tomistoma - false gharial
- Family Alligatoridae
  - Genus Alligator
  - Genus Caiman
  - Genus Melanosuchus - black caiman
  - Genus Paleosuchus
- Family Crocodylidae
  - Genus Crocodylus
  - Genus Mecistops
  - Genus Osteolaemus - dwarf crocodile

==== Order Saurischia ====
Cladistically birds are considered reptiles, but according to traditional taxonomy they are listed separately. Saurischia includes extinct relatives of birds, the "lizard hipped" dinosaurs. See List of bird genera.

== See also ==
- Reptile
- List of California amphibians and reptiles
- List of regional reptiles lists
- List of snakes
- Herping
