= Kapuas mud snake =

Conservation status
- Data Deficient (IUCN 3.1)

Scientific classification
- Kingdom: Animalia
- Phylum: Chordata
- Class: Reptilia
- Order: Squamata
- Suborder: Serpentes
- Family: Homalopsidae
- Genus: Homalophis
- Species: H. gyii

Binomial name
- Homalophis gyii J.C. Murphy, Voris & Auliya, 2005

Synonyms
- Enhydris gyii J.C. Murphy, Voris & Auliya, 2005; Hypsirhina doriae — A.E. Brown, 1902; Enhydris doriae — Barbour, 1912; Enhydris gyii — J.C. Murphy, 2007; Homalophis gyii — J.C. Murphy & Voris, 2014

Species of snake

The Kapuas mud snake (Homalophis gyii) is a species of snake in the family Homalopsidae. The species, which is native to Borneo, can change its epidermal colour spontaneously.

== Etymology ==
The common name, Kapuas mud snake, refers to the Kapuas River. The specific name, gyii, is in honor of Burmese herpetologist Dr Ko Ko Gyi.

== Habitat ==
The preferred natural habitat of H. gyii is freshwater wetlands.

== Colour change ==
The Kapuas mud snake's chameleon-like behaviour was discovered accidentally in 2005 when a specimen was put in a dark bucket. The snake's skin turned pale white 20 minutes later. Scientists determined the snake to be a new species belonging to the genus Enhydris.

== Description ==
H. gyii may attain a total length (including tail) of 150 cm (59 in).

== Venom ==
Like all members of the subfamily Homalopsinae, H. gyii is rear-fanged and mildly venomous.

== Reproduction ==
H. gyii is viviparous.
