= Chinese water snake =

Conservation status
- Least Concern (IUCN 3.1)

Scientific classification
- Kingdom: Animalia
- Phylum: Chordata
- Class: Reptilia
- Order: Squamata
- Suborder: Serpentes
- Family: Homalopsidae
- Genus: Enhydris
- Species: E. chinensis

Binomial name
- Enhydris chinensis (Gray, 1842)

Synonyms
- Hypsirhina chinensis Gray, 1842; Enhydris chinensis — M.A. Smith, 1943; Myrrophis chinensis — Kumar et al., 2012

Species of snake

The Chinese water snake, Chinese smooth water snake, Chinese mud snake or Chinese rice paddy snake (Enhydris chinensis or Myrrophis chinensis) is a species of mildly venomous, rear-fanged snake, endemic to Asia.

== Geographic range ==
Enhydris chinensis is found in China, Taiwan, and Vietnam.

== Habitat ==
As the common name suggests, the Chinese water snake is a highly aquatic species, adapting well to human-altered environments such as fish pools and rice paddies.

== Conservation status ==
Enhydris chinensis is considered common, although it has declined in Taiwan and is protected there.

== Description ==
Enhydris chinensis is a relatively small snake reaching total length (including tail) of up to 80 cm (31 in).

== Diet ==
The Chinese water snake typically feeds on fish and amphibians.

== Commercial use ==
Enhydris chinensis are harvested for food and skins, but this is not considered to be threatening its populations.

== Medicinal use ==
Enhydris chinensis is used in folk medicine. It is commonly used in the production of Chinese snake oil.
