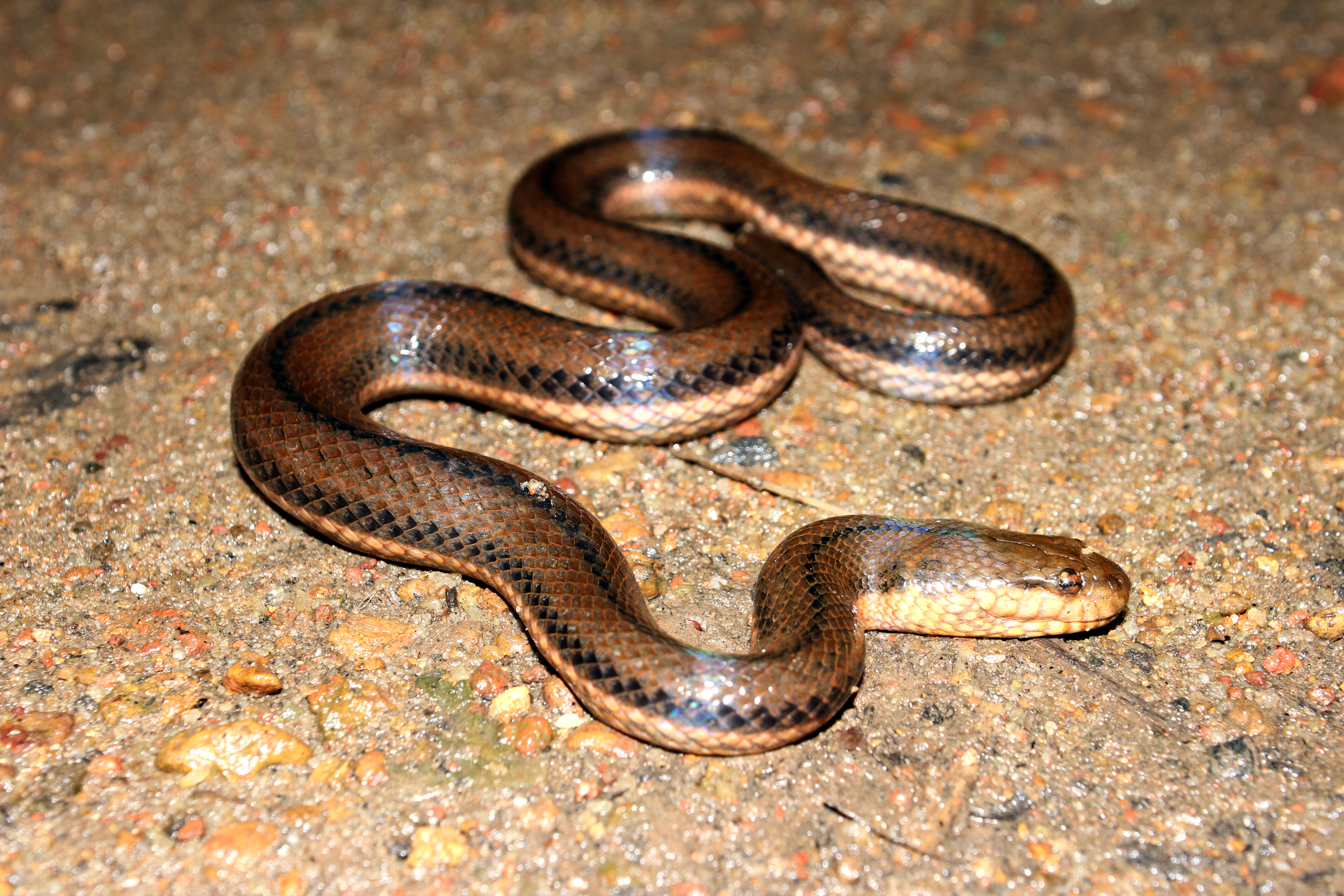

Conservation status
- Near Threatened (IUCN 3.1)

Scientific classification
- Kingdom: Animalia
- Phylum: Chordata
- Class: Reptilia
- Order: Squamata
- Suborder: Serpentes
- Family: Homalopsidae
- Subfamily: Homalopsinae
- Genus: Dieurostus; Berg, 1901
- Species: D. dussumieri

Binomial name
- Dieurostus dussumieri (A.M.C. Duméril, Bibron & A.H.A. Duméril, 1854)

Synonyms
- Eurostus dussumierii A.M.C. Duméril, Bibron & A.H.A. Duméril, 1854; Hypsirhina dussumieri — Jan, 1868; Hypsirhina malabarica F. Werner, 1913; Enhydris dussumieri — M.A. Smith, 1943; Enhydris dussumierii — Chandramouli et al., 2012; Dieurostus dussumieri — Kumar et al., 2012

= Dieurostus =

Genus of snakes

Dieurostus is a genus of snake in the family Homalopsidae. The genus Dieurostus is monotypic, containing only the species Dieurostus dussumieri, commonly known as Dussumier's water snake, or the Kerala mud snake. The species, which is mildly venomous and rear-fanged, is endemic to Kerala, in southwestern India. It was formerly thought to be found in Bangladesh, although its distribution there is now disputed.

== Etymology ==
Both the specific name, dussumieri, and the common name, Dussumier's water snake, are in honor of Jean-Jacques Dussumier, a French merchant, ship owner, and collector of zoological specimens.

== Morphology ==
Diagnosis (genus): Dieurostus is distinguished from all other homalopsids with 25 or 27 rows of smooth scales, nasal scales in contact, and posterior labials horizontally divided, by its divided internasal, upper labials 1–3 contacting the loreal, five lower labials contacting the chin shields (Homalophis doriae has upper labials 2–5 or 2–6 contacting the loreal), and its striped pattern (Ferania sieboldii has a blotched-banded dorsal pattern, the internasal may contact the loreal, and it has three lower labials contacting the chin shields) [after Kumar et al. 2012].

== Geographic range ==
D. dussumieri is endemic to coastal plains of southwestern India, in Kerala state.

== Habits ==
D. dussumieri is a thoroughly aquatic snake, and is more evident during the rains. This species has been sighted in inundated rice paddies, flooded crop fields and is very much at home in lakes and swamps. On land, its movements are rather clumsy and laboured. It feeds mostly on fishes and takes refuge in crab-holes on mud banks and other such safe retreats near water bodies. It is oviparous.
