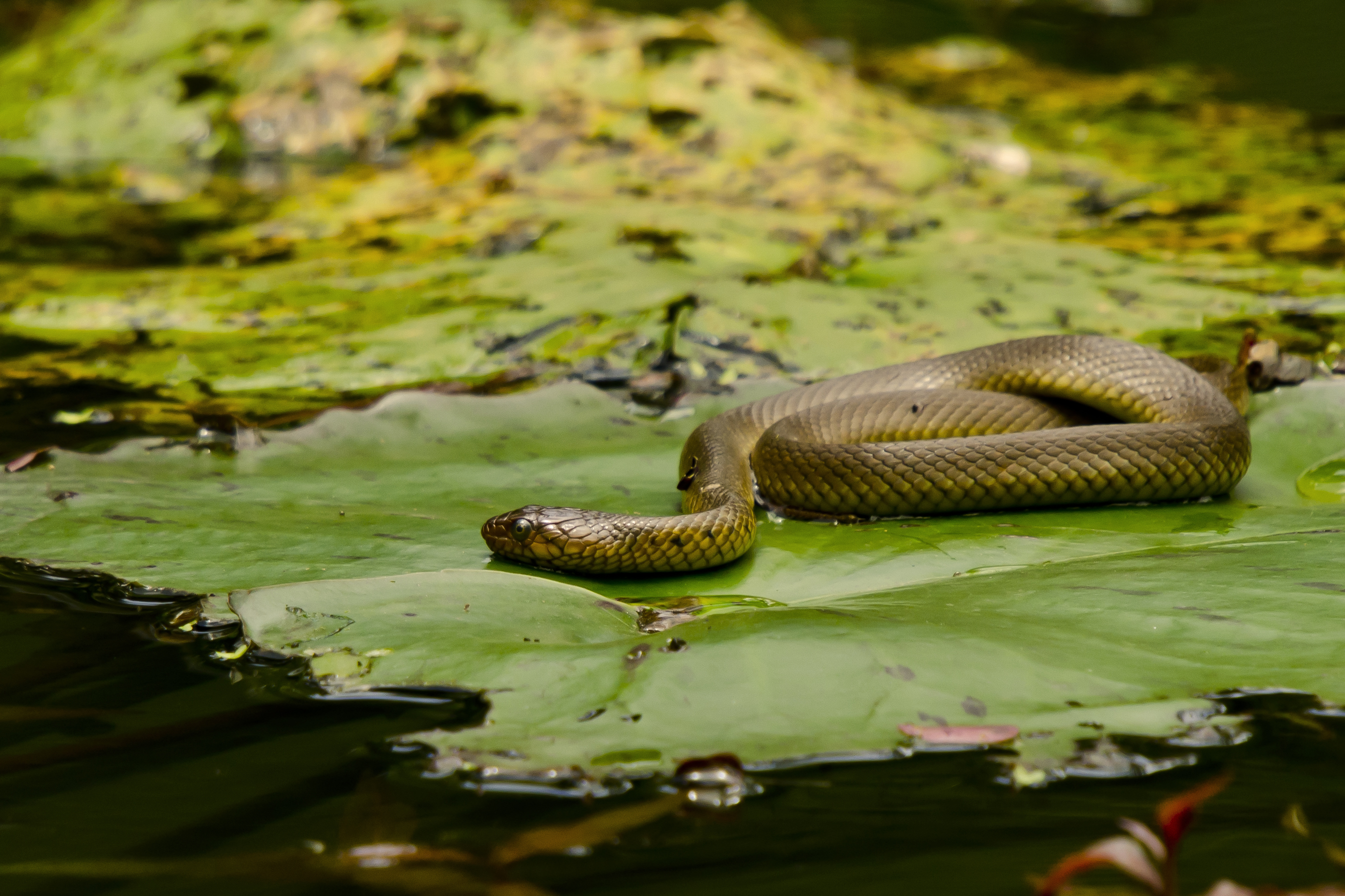

Conservation status
- Least Concern (IUCN 3.1)

Scientific classification
- Kingdom: Animalia
- Phylum: Chordata
- Class: Reptilia
- Order: Squamata
- Suborder: Serpentes
- Family: Homalopsidae
- Genus: Enhydris
- Species: E. enhydris

Binomial name
- Enhydris enhydris (Schneider, 1799)

Synonyms
- Hydrus enhydris Schneider, 1799; Homalopsis enhydris — Cantor, 1847; Hypsirhina enhydris — A.M.C. Duméril, Bibron & A.H.A. Duméril, 1854; Enhydris enhydris — Barbour, 1912

= Rainbow water snake =

Species of snake

The rainbow water snake (Enhydris enhydris) is a species of mildly venomous, rear-fanged, colubrid snake, endemic to Asia.

== Geographic range ==
E. enhydris is found in southeastern China, Indonesia (Bangka, Belitung, Java, Kalimantan, Sulawesi, Sumatra, We), Bangladesh, Cambodia, central and eastern India, Laos, Malaysia (Malaya and East Malaysia, Borneo, Pulau Tioman), Myanmar (Burma), Nepal, Pakistan, Singapore (?), Sri Lanka, Pulau Bangka, Thailand, and Vietnam.

Type locality: "Indiae orientalis"
