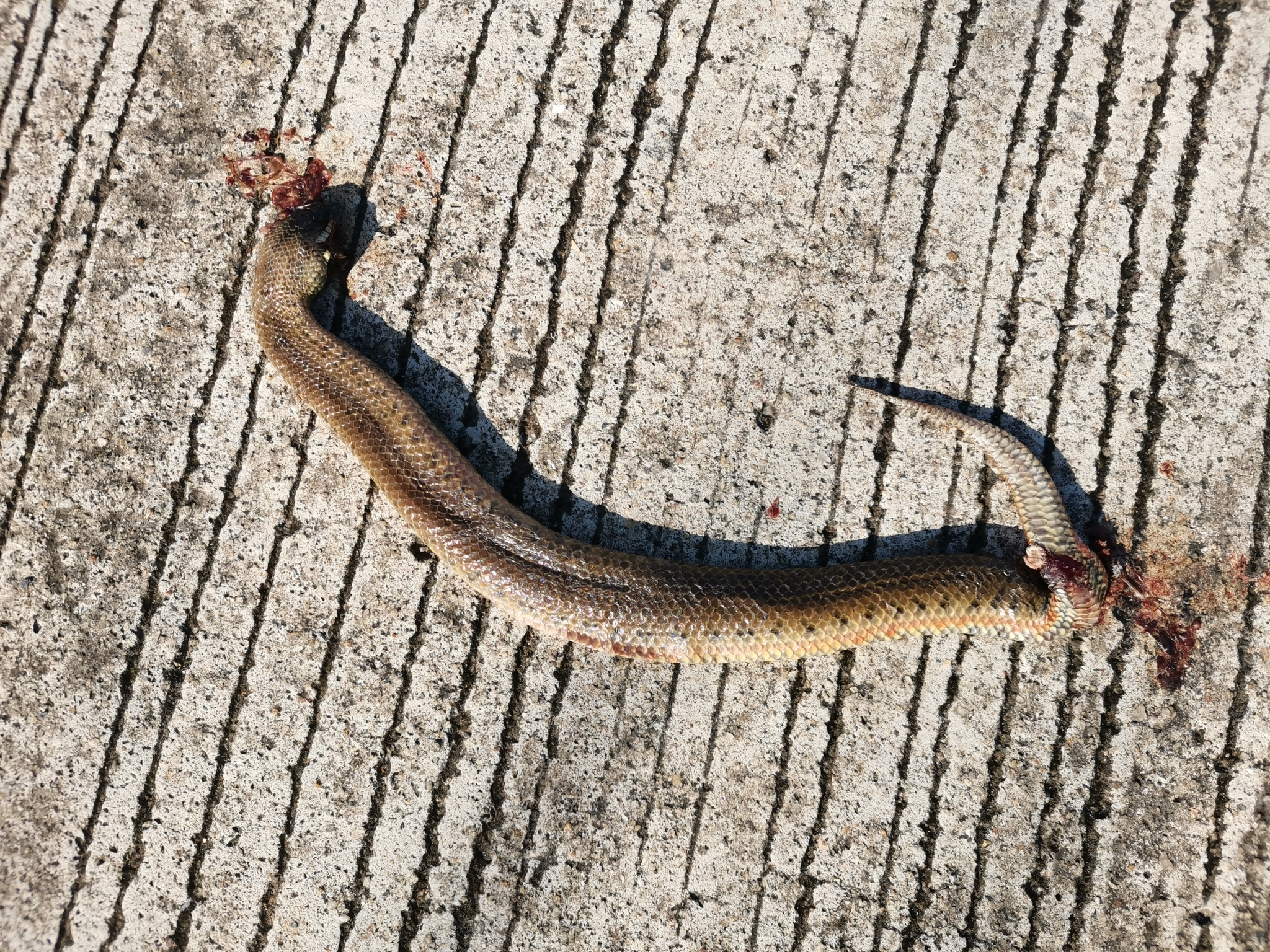
- Found dead

Conservation status
- Data Deficient (IUCN 3.1)

Scientific classification
- Kingdom: Animalia
- Phylum: Chordata
- Class: Reptilia
- Order: Squamata
- Suborder: Serpentes
- Family: Homalopsidae
- Genus: Enhydris
- Species: E. chanardi

Binomial name
- Enhydris chanardi Murphy & Voris, 2005

Synonyms
- Hypsirhina jagorii — Günther, 1864 (not Hypsirhina jagorii W. Peters, 1863); Enhydris jagorii — Cochran, 1930 (not Hypsirhina jagorii W. Peters, 1863)

= Sind River snake =

Species of snake

The Sind River snake (Enhydris chanardi), also known commonly as Chanard's mud snake and Chan-ard's water snake, is a species of mildly venomous, rear-fanged snake in the family Homalopsidae. The species is endemic to Thailand.

== Taxonomy ==
The specific name, chanardi, is in honour of Thai herpetologist (Mr.) Tanya Chan-ard.

== Distribution and habitat ==
E. chanardi is found near or around Bangkok, Thailand. The preferred natural habitat of E. chanardi is freshwater wetlands.

== Behaviour ==
E. chanardi is crepuscular or nocturnal. E. chanardi preys upon fishes and frogs. E. chanardi is viviparous. Little else is known about the biology of this species.

== Threats ==
E. chanardi is listed as "Data Deficient" by the International Union for Conservation of Nature (IUCN).
