= Myanophis =

Scientific classification
- Kingdom: Animalia
- Phylum: Chordata
- Class: Reptilia
- Order: Squamata
- Suborder: Serpentes
- Family: Homalopsidae
- Genus: Myanophis; Köhler, Khaing, Than, Baranski, Schell, Greve, Janke & Pauls, 2021
- Species: M. thanlyinesis

Binomial name
- Myanophis thanlyinesis Köhler, Khaing, Than, Baranski, Schell, Greve, Janke & Pauls, 2021

Genus of snakes

Myanophis is a genus of snake in the family Homalopsidae that contains the sole species Myanophis thanlyinensis. It is endemic to Myanmar, and was described in 2021 from two male and two female specimens found in the vicinity of the campus of East Yangon University.

Aside from genetic differences, it can be distinguished from all other homalopsid genera by its smooth dorsal scales, short tail length in relation to the body, separated nasal scales, unique number of ventral and subcaudal scales, and bilobed hemipenis in males. It is most closely related to the genera Myrrophis and Gyiophis, from which it can be distinguished by its bilobed hemipenis as opposed to unilobed in the other two genera.
