= Crabeater =

A crabeater is an animal species that feeds on crabs. It may refer to:

- Cobia, a species of fish which also is commonly called crabeater
- Crabeater seal, a species of seal
- Crabeater gull, also known as Olrog's gull
- Crab-eating fox, a canid species
- Crab-eating raccoon, a raccoon species
- Crab-eating mongoose, a mongoose species
- Crab-plover, a shorebird species
- Crab-eating frog, a frog species
- Fordonia leucobalia, also known as crab-eating water snake
- Crab-eating macaque, a simian species
