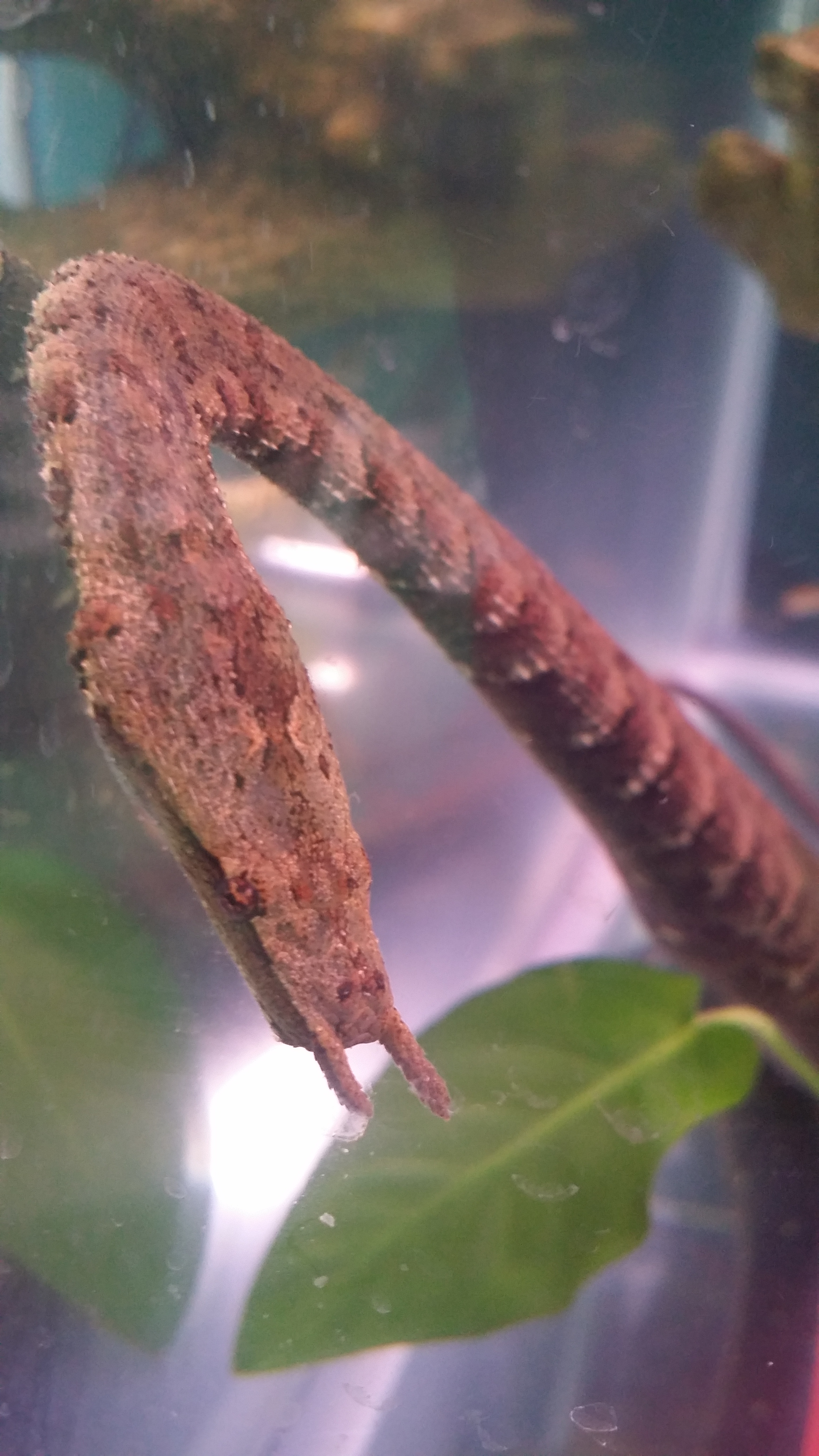
- Tentacled snake head and tentacles

Conservation status
- Least Concern (IUCN 3.1)

Scientific classification
- Kingdom: Animalia
- Phylum: Chordata
- Class: Reptilia
- Order: Squamata
- Suborder: Serpentes
- Family: Homalopsidae
- Genus: Erpeton
- Species: E. tentaculatum

Binomial name
- Erpeton tentaculatum Lacépède, 1800

Synonyms
- Erpeton tentaculatus [orth. error] Lacépède, 1800; Rhinopirus erpeton Merrem, 1820; Homalopsis herpeton Schlegel, 1837; Herpeton tentaculatum Jan, 1860

= Tentacled snake =

Species of snake

The tentacled snake also known as the fishing snake or tentacle snake (Erpeton tentaculatum) is a rear-fanged aquatic snake native to Southeast Asia. It is the only species of the genus Erpeton. The two tentacles on its snout are a unique feature among snakes.

== Description ==
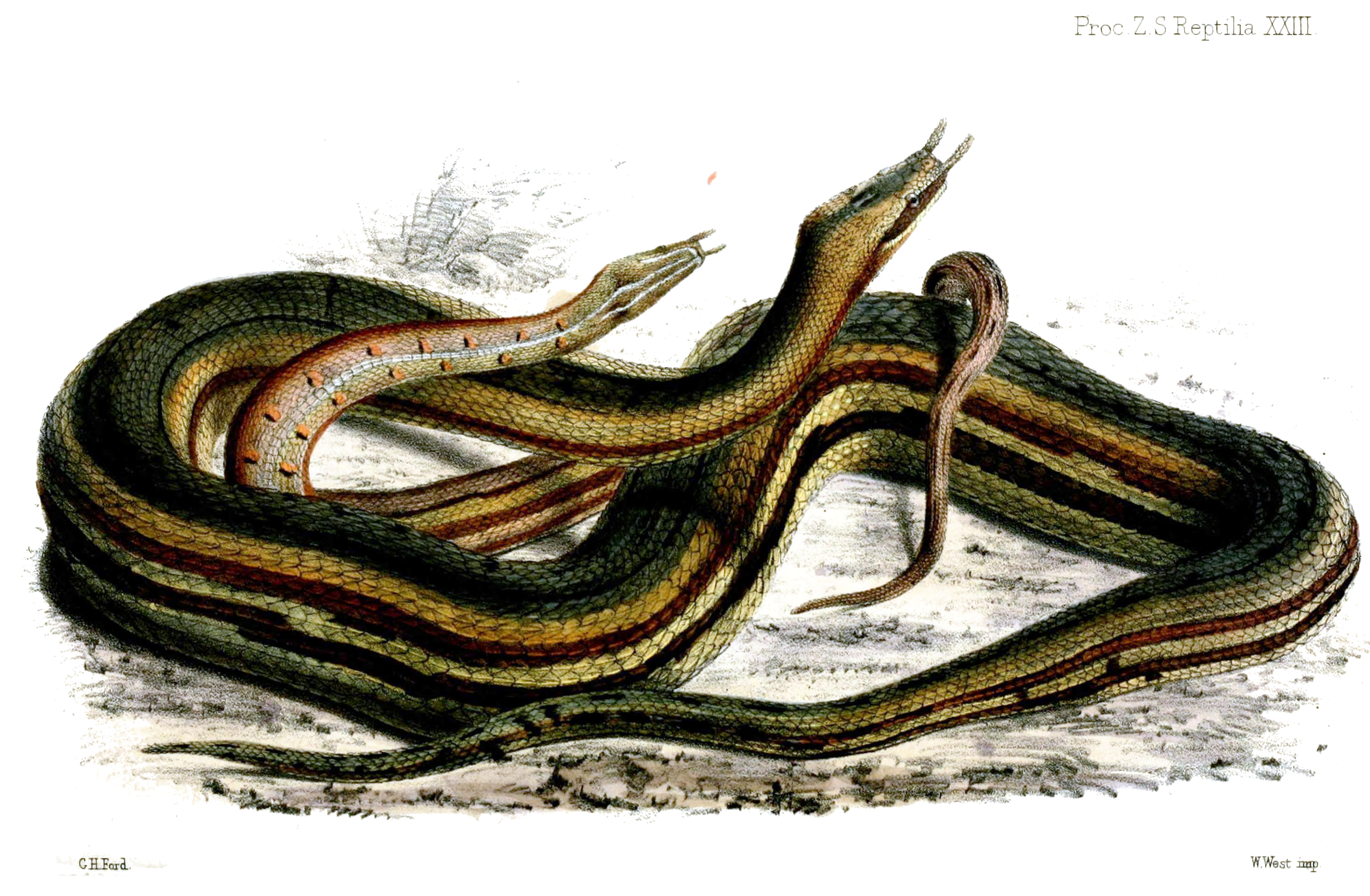

The tentacled snake is a relatively small snake, averaging about 50 to 90 cm (20 to 35 in) in length. They are known to come in two color phases, striped or blotched, with both phases ranging from dark gray or brown to a light tan. It lives its entire life in murky water.

The tentacled snake is the only species of snake to possess twin "tentacles" on the front of its head, which have been shown to have mechanosensory function. Its diet consists solely of fish.

Although it does have venomous fangs, the tentacled snake is not considered dangerous to humans. The fangs are small, only partially grooved, and positioned deep in the rear of the mouth. The venom is specific to the fish that the tentacled snake eats.

== Distribution ==
A native of Southeast Asia, the tentacled snake can be found in Thailand, Cambodia, and Vietnam. The snake lives its entire life in the murky water of lakes, rice paddies, and slow moving streams, and can be found in fresh, brackish, and sea water. A prime example of its habitat is the Tonlé Sap lake in central Cambodia. The water there contains much silt and has a large fish population.

== Reproduction ==
The young develop ovoviviparously and are born live underwater.

== Behaviour ==
Tentacled snakes spend their whole life in the water and can stay underwater for up to 30 minutes without coming up for air. They can only move awkwardly on land. In dry times and at night, the snake may burrow itself in the mud.

Hunting is accomplished via a unique ambush method. Tentacled snakes spend much of their time in a rigid posture. The tail is used to anchor the animal underwater while its body assumes a distinctive upside-down "J" shape. The snake will keep this shape even when grabbed or moved by a person, an apparent freeze response. The striking range is a narrow area downwards from its head, somewhat towards its body. Once a fish swims within that area the snake will strike by pulling itself down in one quick motion towards the prey.

Through the use of high-speed cameras and hydrophones, the snake's method of ambush is revealed in greater detail. The snake anticipates the movements of the fish as it attempts to escape. As the fish swims into range, the snake creates a disturbance in the water by moving part of its body posterior to the neck. This disturbance triggers an escape reflex in the fish called the C-start, in which the fish contorts its body into a "C" shape. Normally at this point the fish would swim quickly away from the disturbance by quickly straightening its body, but the snake grabs it, usually by the head, anticipating its movement. The snake catches fish by tricking them into reflexively attempting to escape in the wrong direction. Unlike most predators, the snake doesn't aim for the fish's initial position and then adjust its direction as the fish moves, it heads directly for the location where it expects the fish's head to be. The ability to predict the position of its prey appears to be innate.

The tentacled snake retracts its eyes when it begins to strike.
