= Miralia =

Scientific classification
- Kingdom: Animalia
- Phylum: Chordata
- Order: Squamata
- Suborder: Serpentes
- Family: Homalopsidae
- Genus: Miralia; Gray, 1842

Genus of snakes

Miralia is a genus of snakes belonging to the family Homalopsidae.

The species of this genus are found in Southeastern Asia.

== Species ==
Species:

- Miralia alternans (Reuss, 1834)
