= Karnsophis =

Scientific classification
- Kingdom: Animalia
- Phylum: Chordata
- Class: Reptilia
- Order: Squamata
- Suborder: Serpentes
- Family: Homalopsidae
- Genus: Karnsophis; Murphy & Voris, 2013

Genus of snakes

Karnsophis is a genus of snakes belonging to the family Homalopsidae. It is monotypic, containing a single species, Karnsophis siantaris.
