= Djokoiskandarus =

Conservation status
- Data Deficient (IUCN 3.1)

Scientific classification
- Kingdom: Animalia
- Phylum: Chordata
- Class: Reptilia
- Order: Squamata
- Suborder: Serpentes
- Family: Homalopsidae
- Genus: Djokoiskandarus; Murphy, 2011
- Species: D. annulata

Binomial name
- Djokoiskandarus annulata (de Jong, 1926)

Synonyms
- Cantoria annulata de Jong, 1926

Genus of snakes

Djokoiskandarus is a genus of snake in the family Homalopsidae that contains the sole species Djokoiskandarus annulata. It is commonly known as the banded water snake.

It is found in New Guinea.
