= Myrrophis =

Scientific classification
- Kingdom: Animalia
- Phylum: Chordata
- Class: Reptilia
- Order: Squamata
- Suborder: Serpentes
- Family: Homalopsidae
- Genus: Myrrophis; Kumar, Sanders, George & Murphy, 2012

Genus of snakes

Myrrophis is a genus of snakes in the family Homalopsidae.

== Species ==
- Myrrophis bennettii (Gray, 1842)
- Myrrophis chinensis (Gray, 1842)
