= Enhydris =

Scientific classification
- Kingdom: Animalia
- Phylum: Chordata
- Class: Reptilia
- Order: Squamata
- Suborder: Serpentes
- Family: Homalopsidae
- Genus: Enhydris; Sonnini & Latreille, 1802

Species
- Six, see text

Genus of snakes

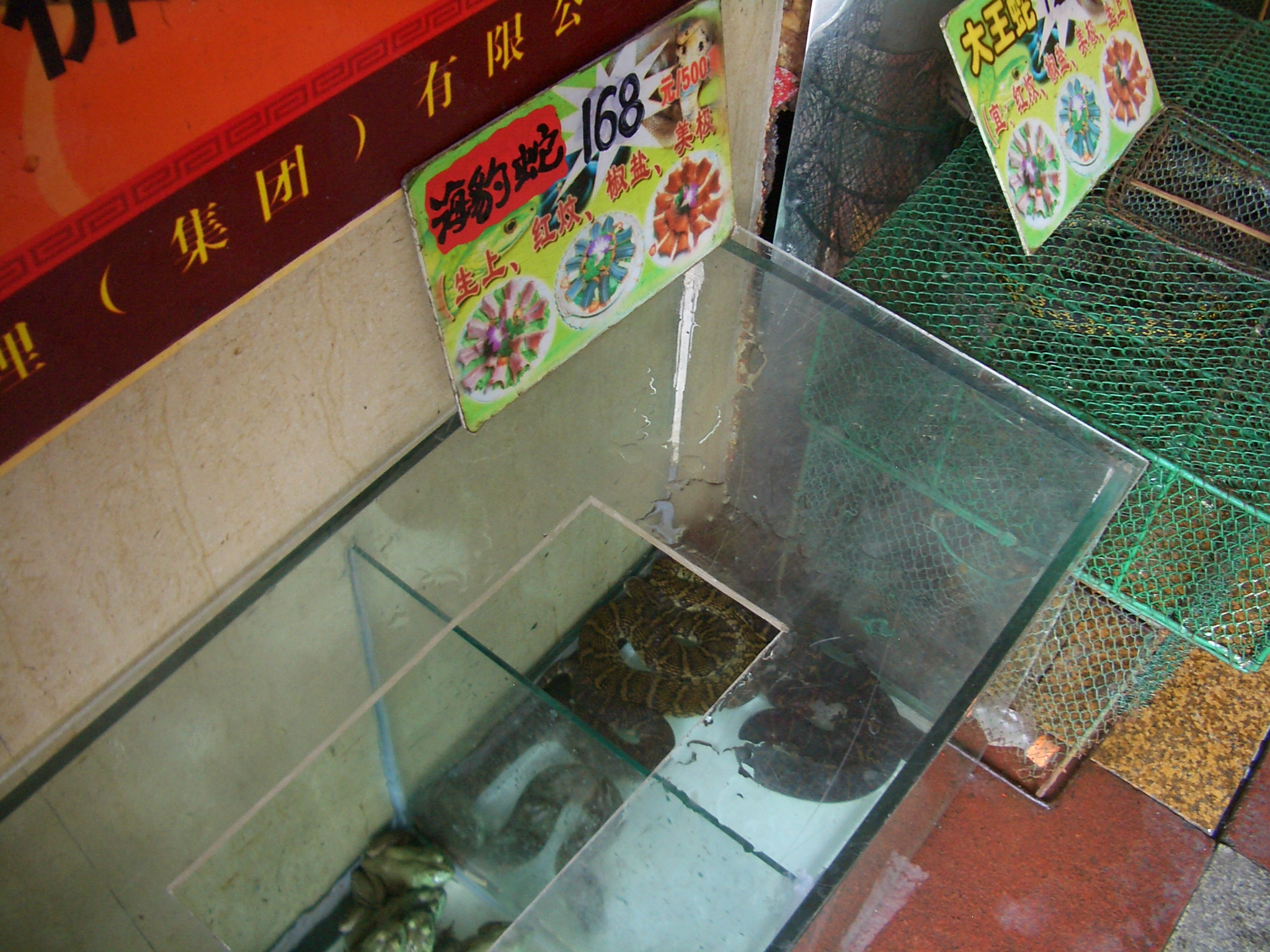
The snake called "海豹蛇" ("sea-leopard snake", Enhydris bocourti, but now often moved to monotypic genus Subsessor), accompanied by a list of options for serving it, occupies a place of honor among the creatures displayed outside of a Guangzhou restaurant

Enhydris is a genus of slightly venomous, rear-fanged snakes in the family Homalopsidae. The genus is endemic to the tropical area of Indo-Australian region.

== Species ==
The following 6 species are recognized:

- Enhydris chanardi Murphy & Voris, 2005
- Enhydris enhydris (Schneider, 1799)
- Enhydris innominata (Morice, 1875)
- Enhydris jagorii (W. Peters, 1863)
- Enhydris longicauda (Bourret, 1934)
- Enhydris subtaeniata (Bourret, 1934)

Several additional species have traditionally been placed here, but are now often in genera such as Subsessor and Pseudoferania. Another species, Enhydris smithi (Boulenger, 1914), was considered to be a valid species by herpetologists M.A. Smith 1943, Das 2010, and Wallach et al. 2014, but was considered to be a synonym of Enhydris jagorii by Cox et al. 1998, and Murphy & Voris 2014.

Nota bene: In the list above, a binomial authority in parentheses indicates that the species was originally described in a genus other than Enhydris.

== Etymology ==
The specific names, jagorii and smithi, are in honor of German naturalist Fedor Jagor and British herpetologist Malcolm Arthur Smith, respectively.
