= Raclitia =

Scientific classification
- Kingdom: Animalia
- Phylum: Chordata
- Order: Squamata
- Suborder: Serpentes
- Family: Homalopsidae
- Genus: Raclitia; Gray, 1842

Genus of snakes

Raclitia is a genus of snakes belonging to the family Homalopsidae. The genus is predominantly native to South and Southeast Asia.

== Species ==
Species:

- Raclitia indica Gray, 1842
