= Calamophis =

Scientific classification
- Kingdom: Animalia
- Phylum: Chordata
- Class: Reptilia
- Order: Squamata
- Suborder: Serpentes
- Family: Homalopsidae
- Genus: Calamophis; Meyer, 1874

Genus of snakes

Calamophis is a genus of snakes of the family Homalopsidae.

== Species ==
- Calamophis jobiensis (Meyer, 1874)
- Calamophis katesandersae Murphy, 2012
- Calamophis ruuddelangi Murphy, 2012
- Calamophis sharonbrooksae Murphy, 2012
