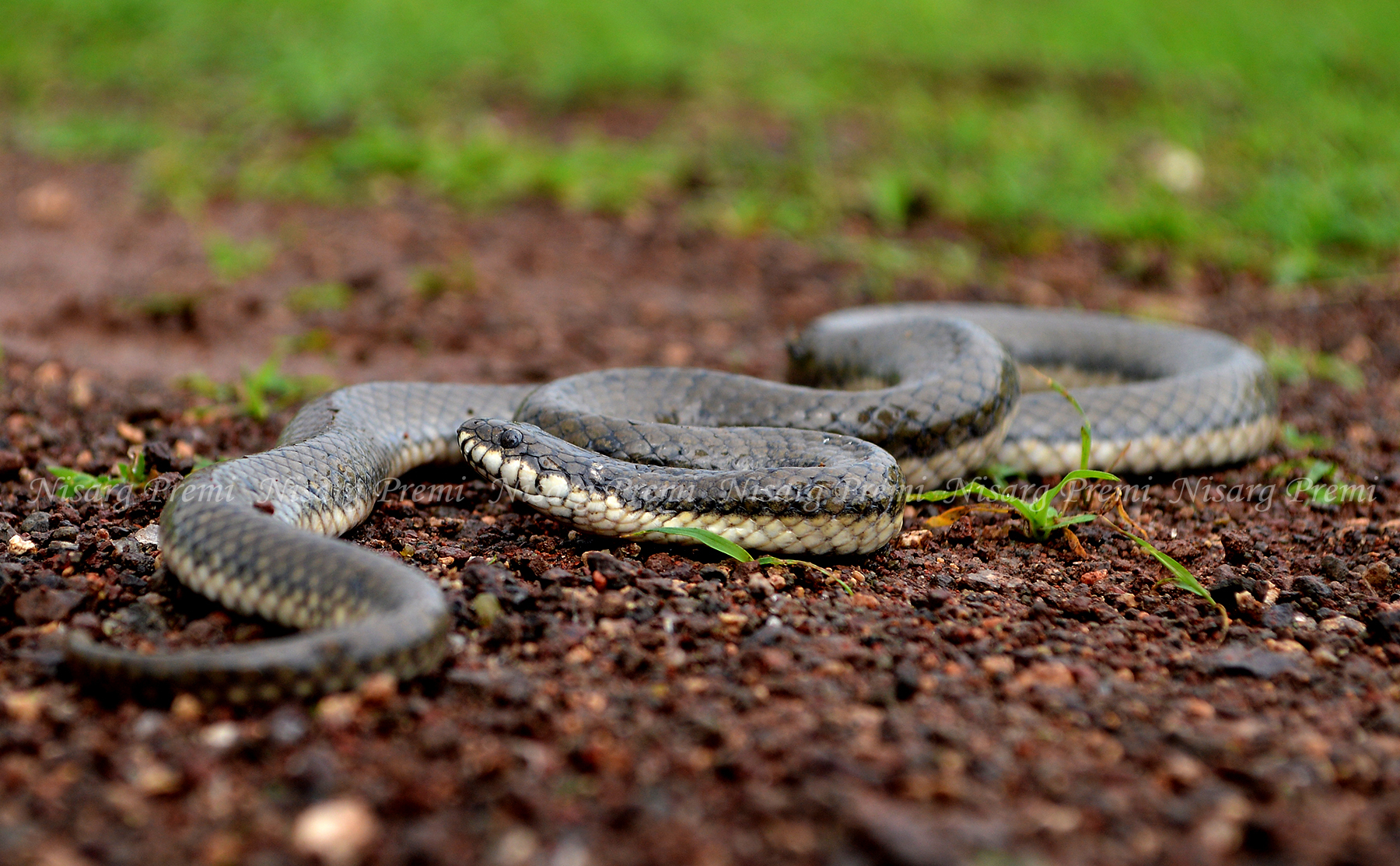

Conservation status
- Least Concern (IUCN 3.1)

Scientific classification
- Kingdom: Animalia
- Phylum: Chordata
- Class: Reptilia
- Order: Squamata
- Suborder: Serpentes
- Family: Homalopsidae
- Genus: Gerarda; Gray, 1849
- Species: G. prevostiana

Binomial name
- Gerarda prevostiana (Eydoux & Gervais, 1837)

Synonyms
- Coluber prevostianus Eydoux & Gervais, 1837; Gerarda bicolor Gray, 1849; Campylodon prevostianum — A.M.C. Duméril & Bibron, 1854; Heleophis flavescens F. Müller, 1884; Gerardia [sic] prevostiana — Boulenger, 1890; Gerarda prevostiana — Manthey & Grossmann, 1997

= Gerarda prevostiana =

Species of snake

Gerarda prevostiana, commonly known as the cat-eyed water snake, Gerard's water snake, and the glossy marsh snake, is a species of snake in the family Homalopsidae. The species is endemic to Asia. It is the only species in the genus Gerarda.

== Etymology ==
The generic name, Gerarda, is in honor of someone named "Gerard". Unfortunately, John Edward Gray, who named the genus in 1849, did not specify whom he was honoring. Two possibilities are Adam Gerard or Rev. Gerard R. Smith, both of whom sent specimens of reptiles to Gray at the British Museum.

The specific name, prevostiana, is in honor of French naturalist and illustrator Florent Prévost.

== Diet ==
G. prevostiana feeds almost exclusively on crabs, which it tears into bite-sized pieces by pulling them through its coils, in contrast to most other snakes which swallow their prey whole.

== Description ==
G. prevostiana has the following scalation. The frontal is a little longer than broad, shorter than its distance from the end of the snout, or than the parietals. The loreal is slightly longer than deep, a little smaller than the nasal. There is one preocular, and there are two postoculars. The temporals are arranged 1+2. There are eight upper labials, the fourth entering the eye. Four of the lower labials are in contact with the anterior chin shields. The anterior chin shields are much larger than the posterior chin shields. The dorsal scales are in 17 rows at midbody. The ventrals number 146–158. The anal is divided. The subcaudals number 31–34.

The body is uniform dark olive above, with three outer rows of scales whitish. The upper lip is white, and the rostral is dark olive. The ventrals and subcaudals are whitish, with dark edges.

The total length is 41 cm (16 inches), including the tail which is 5 cm (2 inches) long.

== Geographic range ==
G. prevostiana is found in coastal areas between western India (Mumbai) to eastern Philippines; it occurs in India (including the Andaman Islands) Sri Lanka, Bangladesh, Myanmar, Thailand, Peninsular Malaysia, Singapore, Cambodia, Indonesia (Borneo: Sarawak), and the Philippines (Luzon).

== Habitat ==
The preferred natural habitat of G. prevostiana is coastal areas, especially those with mangrove forest.

== Behavior ==
G. prevostiana is terrestrial and nocturnal.

== Reproduction ==
G. prevostiana is ovoviviparous.
