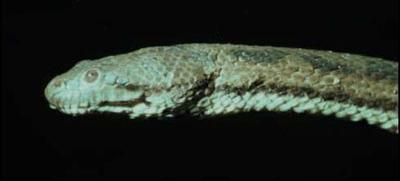
- Cerberus rynchops

Scientific classification
- Kingdom: Animalia
- Phylum: Chordata
- Class: Reptilia
- Order: Squamata
- Suborder: Serpentes
- Family: Homalopsidae
- Genus: Cerberus; Cuvier, 1829

Species
- Five, see text.

= Cerberus (snake) =

Genus of snakes

Cerberus (common name dog-faced water snakes) is a small genus of snakes in the family Homalopsidae.

== Geographic range and habitat ==
Member species of the genus Cerberus are common inhabitants of Southeast Asia's mangrove habitat and mudflats.

== Etymology ==
The generic name, Cerberus, refers to the dog-like Greek mythological creature Cerberus.

== Species ==
The following five species are recognized as being valid.

- Cerberus australis (Gray, 1842)
- Cerberus dunsoni Murphy, Voris & Karns, 2012
- Cerberus microlepis Boulenger, 1896
- Cerberus rynchops (Schneider, 1799)
- Cerberus schneiderii (Schlegel, 1837)

Nota bene: A binomial authority in parentheses indicates that the species was originally described in a genus other than Cerberus.
