= Kualatahan =

Scientific classification
- Domain: Eukaryota
- Kingdom: Animalia
- Phylum: Chordata
- Class: Reptilia
- Order: Squamata
- Suborder: Serpentes
- Family: Homalopsidae
- Genus: Kualatahan; Murphy & Voris, 2014

Genus of snakes

Kualatahan is a genus of snakes belonging to the family Homalopsidae.

== Species ==
Species:

- Kualatahan pahangensis (Tweedie, 1946)
