= Heurnia =

Scientific classification
- Kingdom: Animalia
- Phylum: Chordata
- Class: Reptilia
- Order: Squamata
- Suborder: Serpentes
- Family: Homalopsidae
- Genus: Heurnia; Jong, 1926

Genus of snakes

Heurnia is a genus of snakes belonging to the family Homalopsidae.

== Species ==
Species:

- Heurnia ventromaculata Jong, 1926
