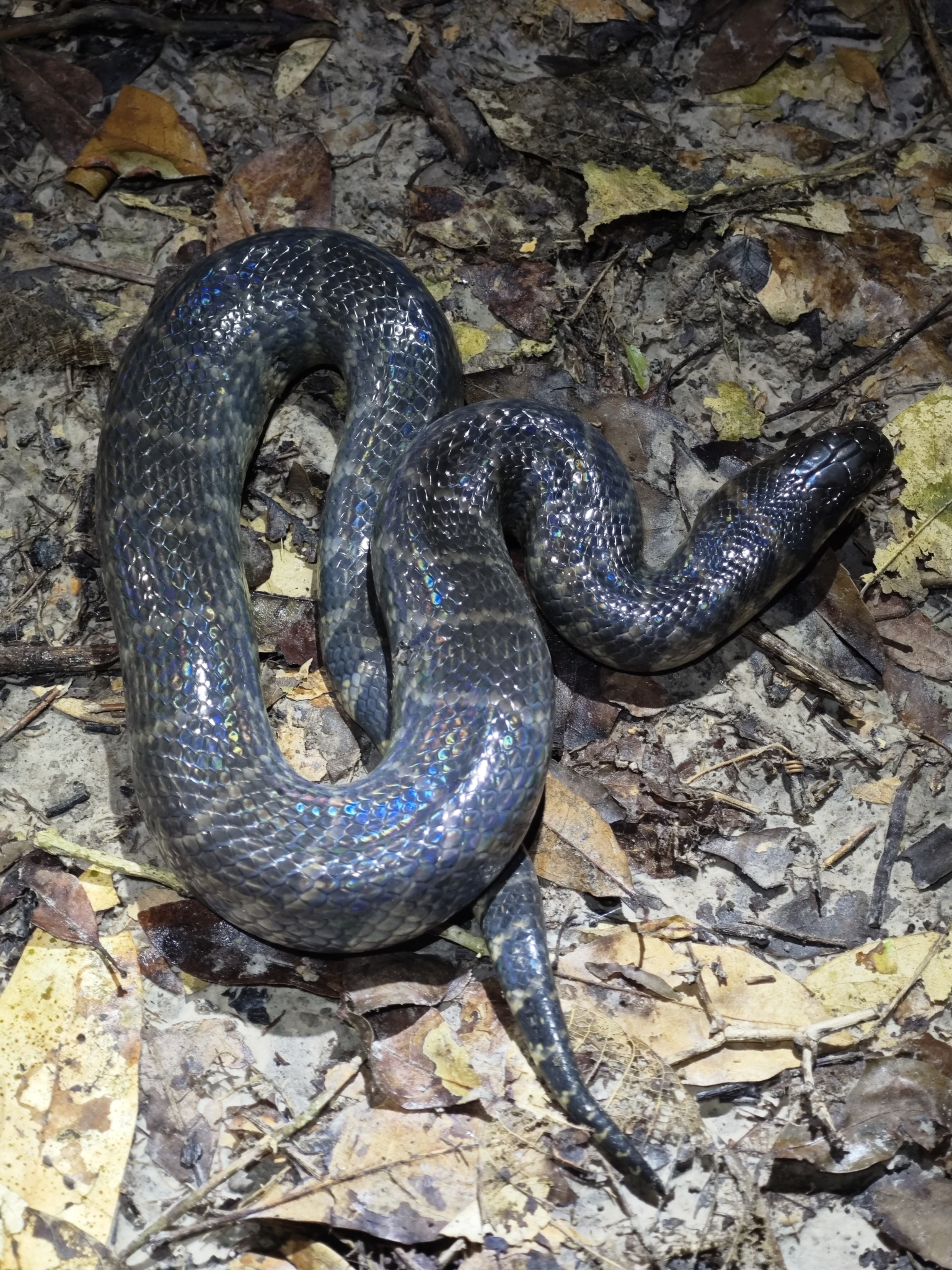

Conservation status
- Least Concern (IUCN 3.1)

Scientific classification
- Kingdom: Animalia
- Phylum: Chordata
- Class: Reptilia
- Order: Squamata
- Suborder: Serpentes
- Family: Homalopsidae
- Genus: Subsessor; J.C. Murphy & Voris, 2014
- Species: S. bocourti

Binomial name
- Subsessor bocourti (Jan, 1865)

Synonyms
- Hypsirhina bocourti Jan, 1865; Enhydris bocourti — M.A. Smith, 1943; Subsessor bocourti — J.C. Murphy & Voris, 2014; Enhydris bocourti — Chan-ard et al., 2015

= Subsessor =

Genus of snakes

Subsessor is a genus of snake in the family Homalopsidae. The genus is monotypic, containing the sole species Subsessor bocourti. The species is commonly known as Bocourt's mud snake or Bocourt's water snake and has traditionally been placed in the genus Enhydris.

== Etymology ==
Both the specific name, bocourti, and the common name, Bocourt's water snake, refer to French zoologist Marie Firmin Bocourt.

== Geographic range and habitat ==
S. bocourti is found in a wide range of stagnant fresh water habitats in Mainland Southeast Asia. Records from China are questionable.

== Description ==
A robust snake, S. bocourti can surpass 1 m (3.3 ft) in length.

== Reproduction ==
S. bocourti is a live bearing species, giving birth to, on average, 3–8 fully formed neonate snakes.

== Diet ==
S. bocourti feeds on frogs, fishes, and crustaceans.

== Commercial use ==
Bocourt's water snake is widely caught for its skin and sometimes also eaten.
