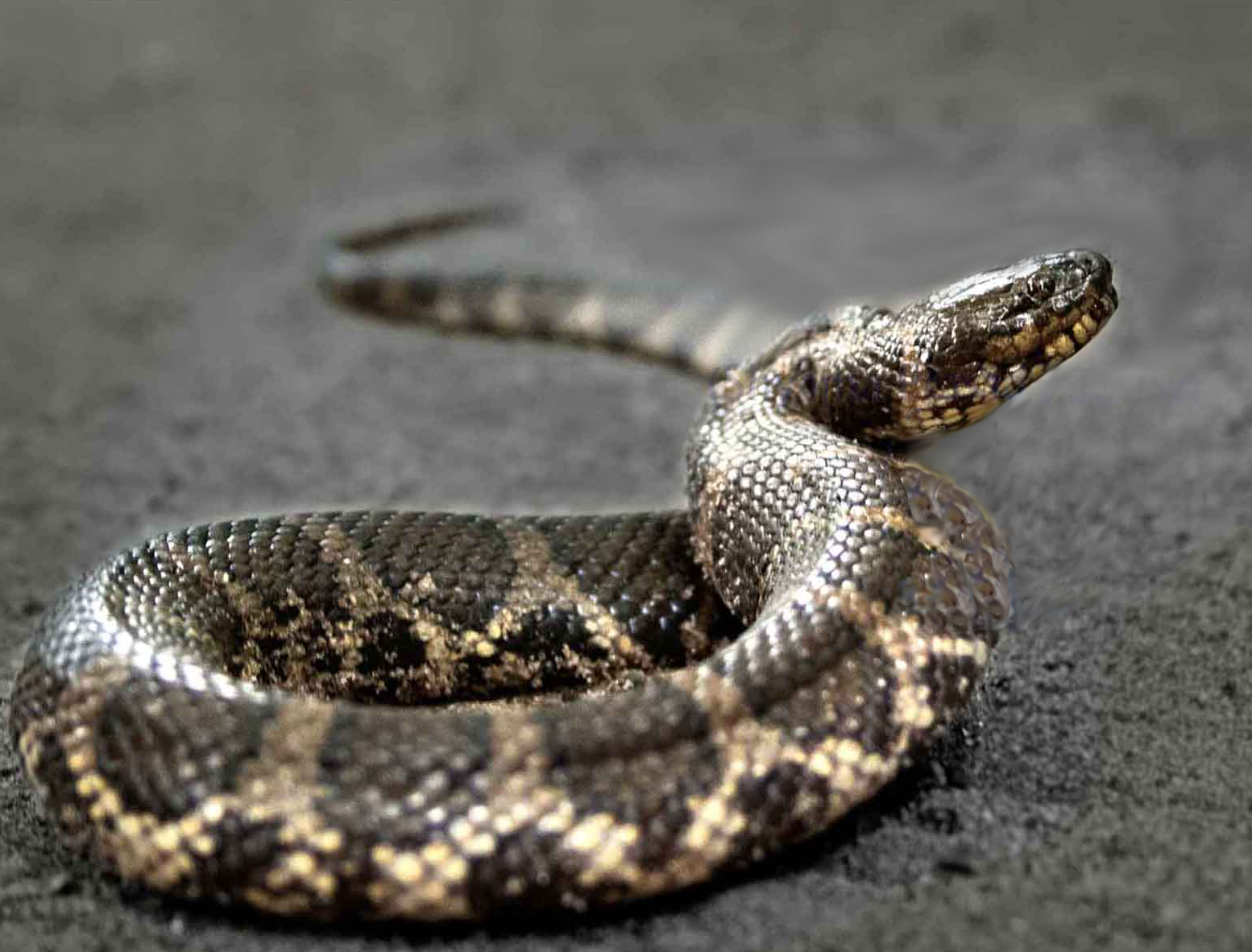
- Ferania sieboldii

Conservation status
- Least Concern (IUCN 3.1)

Scientific classification
- Kingdom: Animalia
- Phylum: Chordata
- Class: Reptilia
- Order: Squamata
- Suborder: Serpentes
- Family: Homalopsidae
- Genus: Ferania
- Species: F. sieboldii

Binomial name
- Ferania sieboldii (Schlegel, 1837)

Synonyms
- Homalopsis sieboldii Schlegel, 1837; Trigonurus sieboldii — A.M.C. Duméril, Bibron & A.H.A. Duméril, 1854; Enhydris sieboldii — Günther, 1864; Hypsirhina sieboldii — Jan, 1868; Feranoides jamnæticus Carlleyle, 1869; Enhydris sieboldi — M.A. Smith, 1943; Ferania sieboldii — Kumar et al., 2012

= Siebold's water snake =

Species of snake

Siebold's water snake (Ferania sieboldii), also known commonly as Siebold's mud snake and Siebold's smooth water snake, is a species of mildly venomous, rear-fanged snake in the family Homalopsidae. The species is endemic to Asia.

== Etymology ==
Both the specific name, sieboldii, and the common name, Siebold's water snake, are in honor of Philipp Franz von Siebold, a German botanist and physician.

== Geographic range ==
F. sieboldii is found in Bangladesh, northcentral India, and western Malaysia.

== Habitat ==
The preferred natural habitat of F. sieboldii is freshwater wetlands.

== Description ==
F. sieboldii has a dorsal pattern of large blotches similar to those of a python, but it is distinctive in having its nostrils on the top of the snout to aid its aquatic lifestyle. It also lacks labial pits.

It may attain a total length (including tail) of 89 cm (35 in). A female of that length had a tail which was 11 cm (4.3 in) long.

== Reproduction ==
F. sieboldii is viviparous.
