= Mintonophis =

Scientific classification
- Domain: Eukaryota
- Kingdom: Animalia
- Phylum: Chordata
- Class: Reptilia
- Order: Squamata
- Suborder: Serpentes
- Family: Homalopsidae
- Genus: Mintonophis; Murphy & Voris, 2014

Genus of snakes

Mintonophis is a genus of snakes belonging to the family Homalopsidae.

The species of this genus are found in India.

== Species ==
Species:

- Mintonophis pakistanicus (Mertens, 1959)
