= Cantoria violacea =

Scientific classification
- Kingdom: Animalia
- Phylum: Chordata
- Order: Squamata
- Suborder: Serpentes
- Family: Homalopsidae
- Genus: Cantoria; Girard, 1858
- Species: C. violacea

Binomial name
- Cantoria violacea Girard, 1857

Species of snake

Cantoria violacea, commonly known as Cantor's water snake, is a species of snake found in tropical Asia. It is named in honor of the 19th century herpetologist Theodore Cantor.

== Description ==
Rostral broader than deep. Frontal a little longer than broad, shorter than its distance from the end of the snout, and shorter than the parietals. Eye between four shields: a preocular, a supraocular, a postocular, and a subocular. Loreal longer than deep. One elongate anterior temporal, in contact with the postocular and the subocular. 5 upper labials. 3 lower labials in contact with the anterior chin shields, which are not longer than the posterior chin shields.

Dorsal scales smooth, without apical pits, in 19 rows. Ventrals 266–278; anal divided; subcaudals 56–64.

Blackish above, with white transverse bands, which widen towards the abdomen. These bands are very narrow in the typical form, wider in the var. dayana, but constantly much narrower than the black interspaces. Some white spots on the head. Lower parts white, with greyish spots, which are continuations of the dorsal crossbands. These bands may form complete rings on the tail.

Total length 3 feet: tail 4 inches.

== Distribution ==
Myanmar, southern Thailand, Indonesia (Kalimantan, Sumatra, Timor), India (Andaman Islands), western Malaysia (Malaya), and Singapore.

== Notes ==
- Boulenger, George A. 1890 The Fauna of British India, Including Ceylon and Burma. Reptilia and Batrachia. Taylor & Francis, London, xviii, 541 pp.
- Frith, C.B. & Boswell, J. 1978 Cantor's Water Snake, Cantoria violaecea Girard, a vertebrate new to the fauna of Thailand. Nat. Hist. Bull. Siam Soc. (Bangkok) 27: 187–189
- Ghodke, Sameer and Harry V. Andrews 2002 Recent record of Cantoria violacea (Girard, 1857) from North and Middle Andaman Islands, India with a note on its bite. Hamadryad. 26 (2):371-373 [2001]
- Girard, C. 1858 Descriptions of some new Reptiles, collected by the US. Exploring Expedition under the command of Capt. Charles Wilkes, U.S.N. Third Part. Proc. Acad. nat. Sci. Philad. 9: 181–182 [1857]
