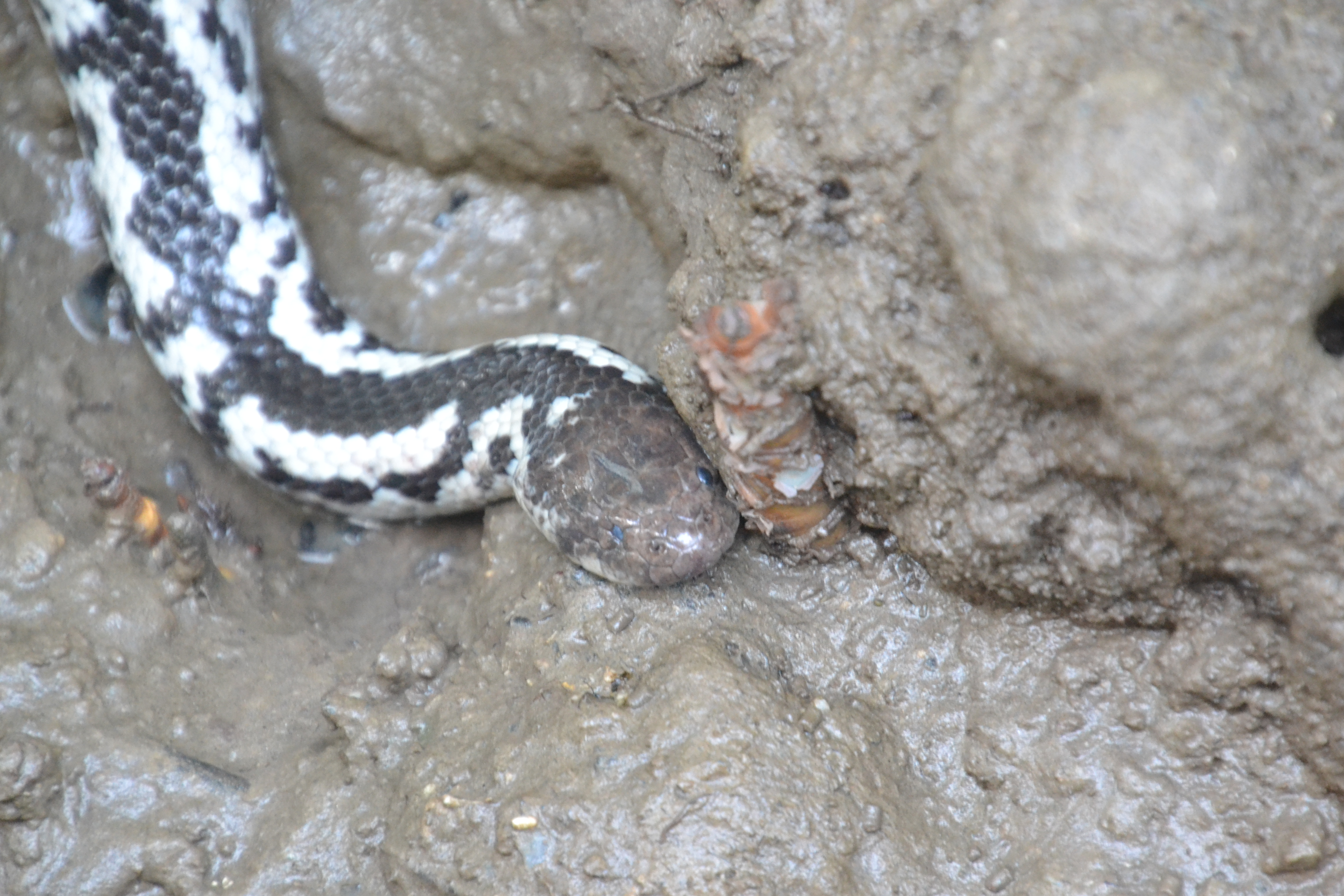

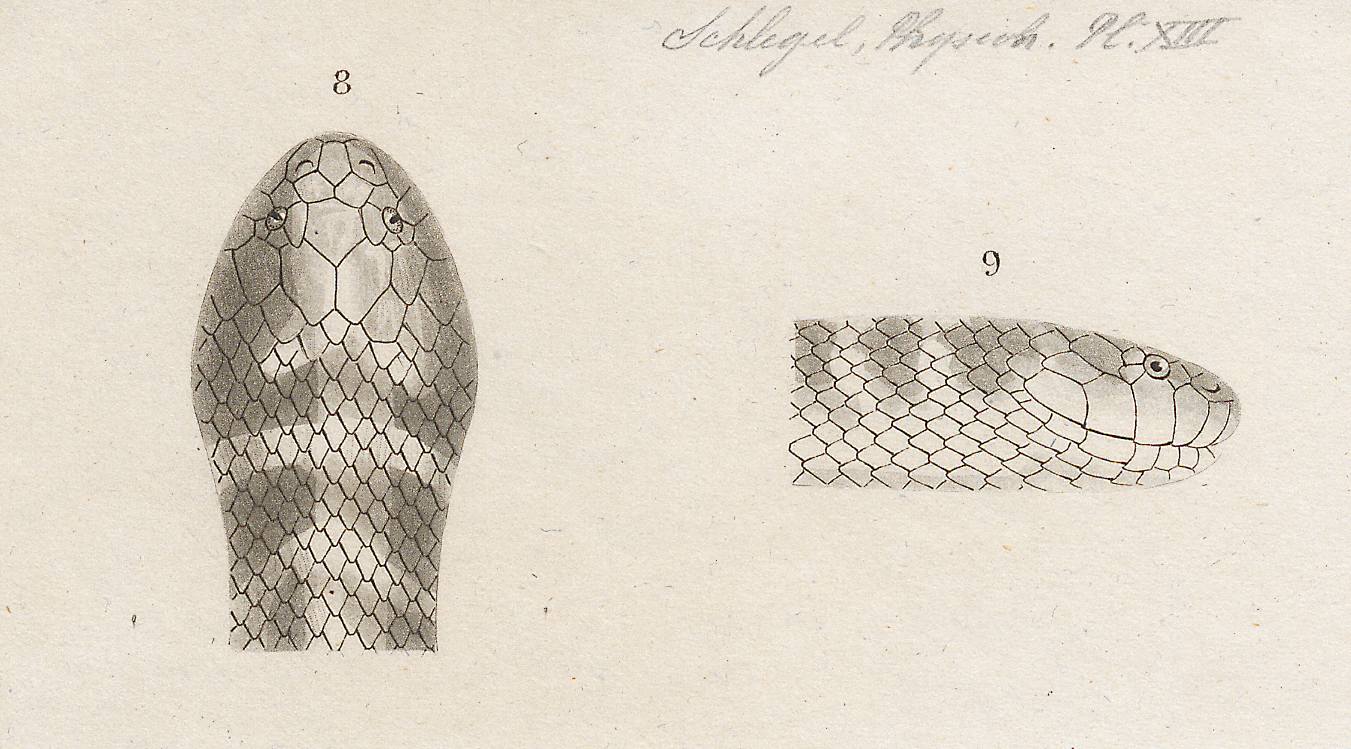

Conservation status
- Least Concern (IUCN 3.1)

Scientific classification
- Kingdom: Animalia
- Phylum: Chordata
- Class: Reptilia
- Order: Squamata
- Suborder: Serpentes
- Family: Homalopsidae
- Genus: Fordonia; Gray, 1836
- Species: F. leucobalia

Binomial name
- Fordonia leucobalia (Schlegel, 1837)

= Fordonia =

Genus of snakes

Fordonia is a genus of aquatic snakes in the family Homalopsidae. It is monotypic, being represented by the single species Fordonia leucobalia, commonly known as crab-eating water snake and white-bellied mangrove snake. It is a common resident of mangrove swamps and tropical tidal wetlands from the coast of Southeast Asia to Indonesia and the coasts of Northern Australia.

Individual F. leucobalia reach up to a meter in length, and are brown or gray in color with a white belly. There is significant color variation. Some have spots. The anatomy reflects the snake's water-living lifestyle: the eyes are located atop the head, and the nostrils have valves that close when the snake dives.

The snake eats small prey that live in its habitat, such as frogs and small fish, and it specializes in crabs, hence its name. Like other homalopsines, F. leucobalia bears live young.
