= Gyiophis =

Scientific classification
- Kingdom: Animalia
- Phylum: Chordata
- Class: Reptilia
- Order: Squamata
- Suborder: Serpentes
- Family: Homalopsidae
- Genus: Gyiophis; Murphy & Voris, 2014

Type species
- Hypsirhina maculosa Blanford, 1879

Genus of snakes

Gyiophis is a genus of snakes in the family Homalopsidae. The genus is endemic to Myanmar.

== Etymology ==
The genus Gyiophis was named in honor of the Burmese herpetologist Ko Ko Gyi.

== Species ==
As of 2017, three described species have been classified in the genus Gyiophis.

- Gyiophis maculosus (Blanford, 1879) – Blanford's mud snake
- Gyiophis salweenensis Quah et al., 2017 – Salween River basin mud snake
- Gyiophis vorisi (Murphy, 2007) – Voris' mud snake

Nota bene: A binomial authority in parentheses indicates that the species was originally described in a genus other than Gyiophis.

== Geographic range ==
All three species in the genus Gyiophis are found in Myanmar. Two species, G. maculosa and G. vorisi, live in the Irrawaddy Delta, whereas G. salweenensis lives in the Salween River basin.
