= Homalophis =

Scientific classification
- Kingdom: Animalia
- Phylum: Chordata
- Class: Reptilia
- Order: Squamata
- Suborder: Serpentes
- Family: Homalopsidae
- Genus: Homalophis; W. Peters, 1871

Genus of snakes

Homalophis is a genus of snakes in the family Homalopsidae. The genus is endemic to Southeast Asia.

== Species ==
The following two species are recognized as being valid.

- Homalophis doriae W. Peters, 1871
- Homalophis gyii (Murphy, Voris & Auliya, 2005)

Nota bene: A binomial authority in parentheses indicates that the species was originally described in a genus other than Homalophis.
