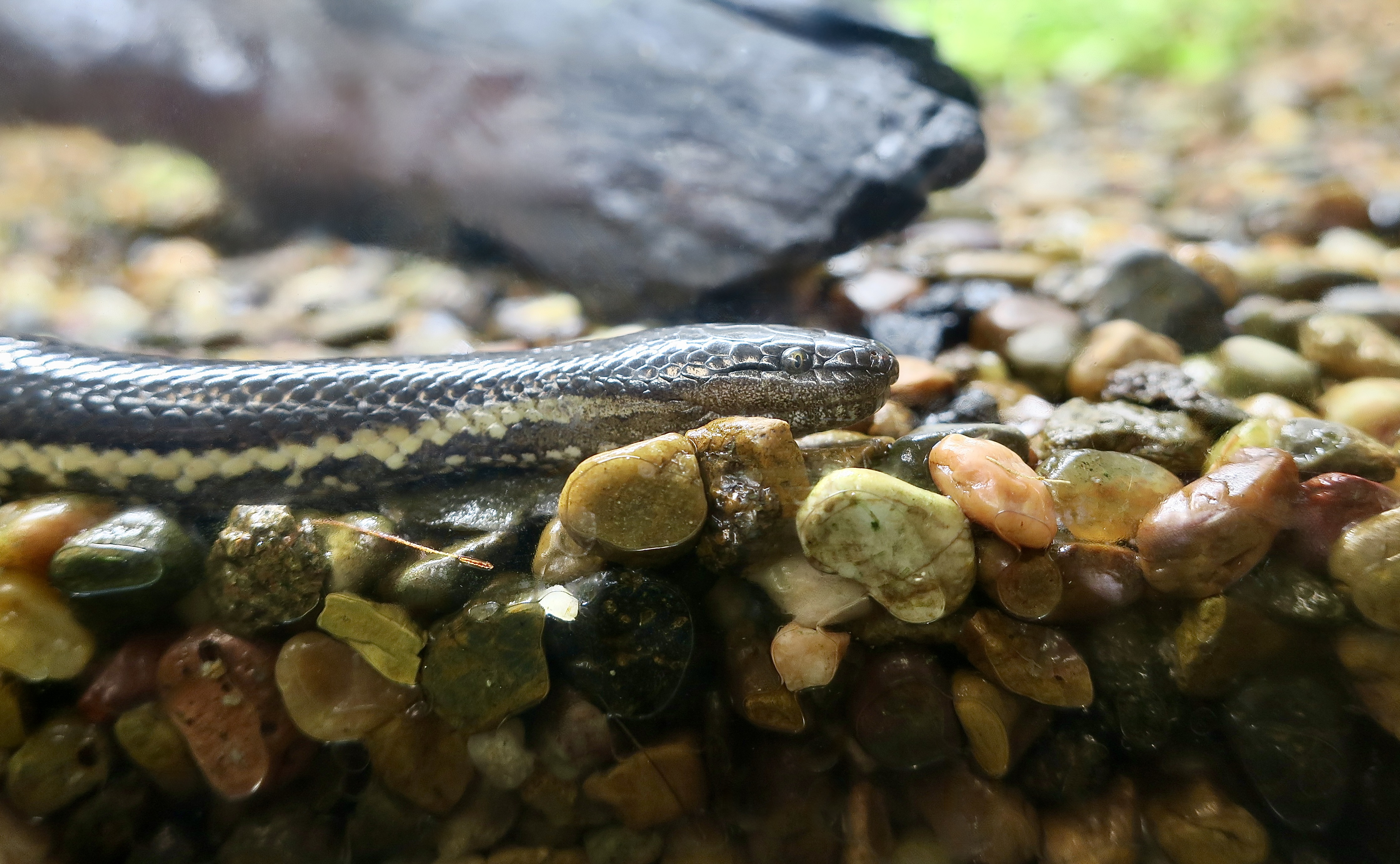

Scientific classification
- Kingdom: Animalia
- Phylum: Chordata
- Class: Reptilia
- Order: Squamata
- Suborder: Serpentes
- Family: Homalopsidae
- Genus: Pseudoferania; Ogilby, 1891
- Species: P. polylepis

Binomial name
- Pseudoferania polylepis Fischer, 1886

Synonyms
- Hypsirhina polylepis Fischer, 1886; Enhydris polylepis (Fischer, 1886); Pseudofeania macleayi Ogilby, 1890

= Pseudoferania =

Genus of snakes

Pseudoferania is a genus of snake in the family Homalopsidae. The genus is monotypic, containing the sole species Pseudoferania polylepis (MacLeay's water snake). The snake is found in Australia and New Guinea.

== Description ==
MacLeay's water snake is a largely nocturnal species that is typically found in coastal Northern Territory. The water snakes spend most of their time in or near water where they feed; they will only leave to bask in the sun or breed. They are found mostly in freshwater lagoons, swamps and creeks and can also be found sheltering in vegetation near water. Their range increases markedly during wet season flooding. Their most defining characteristic is their stout bodies and strongly keeled scales. In terms of breeding, water snakes are viviparous which means that they give birth to up to 15 live offspring instead of laying eggs. They are a mildly venomous species with rear-facing fangs.
