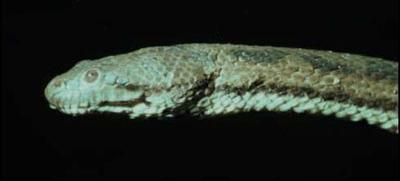
- New Guinea bockadam Cerberus rynchops

Scientific classification
- Domain: Eukaryota
- Kingdom: Animalia
- Phylum: Chordata
- Class: Reptilia
- Order: Squamata
- Suborder: Serpentes
- Clade: Colubroides
- Family: Homalopsidae; Bonaparte, 1845

Genera
- 29, see text

= Homalopsidae =

Family of snakes

The Homalopsidae are a family of snakes which contains about 30 genera and more than 50 species. They are commonly known as Indo-Australian water snakes, mudsnakes, or bockadams. They are also known as ular air (lit. "water snake") in Indonesian. They are typically stout-bodied water snakes, and all are mildly venomous. Two monotypic genera are notable for their unusual morphology: Erpeton possesses a pair of short, fleshy appendages protruding from the front of the snout, and Bitia has uniquely enlarged palatine teeth. Cerberus species have been noted to use sidewinding to cross slick mud flats during low tide. Fordonia and Gerarda are the only snakes known to tear their prey apart before eating it, pulling soft-shelled crabs through their coils to rip them apart prior to ingestion.

== Genera ==
- Bitia Gray, 1842
- Brachyorrhos Kuhl, 1826
- Calamophis Meyer, 1874
- Cantoria Girard, 1857
- Cerberus Cuvier, 1829
- Dieurostus Berg, 1901
- Djokoiskandarus J.C. Murphy, 2011
- Enhydris Sonnini & Latreille, 1802
- Erpeton Lacépède, 1800
- Ferania Gray, 1842
- Fordonia Gray, 1837
- Gerarda Gray, 1849
- Gyiophis J.C. Murphy & Voris, 2014
- Heurnia de Jong, 1926
- Homalophis W. Peters, 1871
- Homalopsis Kuhl & Hasselt, 1822
- Hypsiscopus Fitzinger, 1843
- Karnsophis J.C. Murphy & Voris, 2013
- Kualatahan J.C. Murphy & Voris, 2014
- Mintonophis J.C. Murphy & Voris, 2014
- Miralia Gray, 1842
- Myanophis G. Köhler et al., 2021
- Myron Gray, 1849
- Myrrophis Kumar, Sanders, George & J.C. Murphy, 2012
- Phytolopsis Gray, 1849
- Pseudoferania Ogilby, 1891
- Raclitia Gray, 1842
- Subsessor J.C. Murphy & Voris, 2014
- Sumatranus J.C. Murphy & Voris, 2014
