= Snake skeleton =

Skeleton of a snake

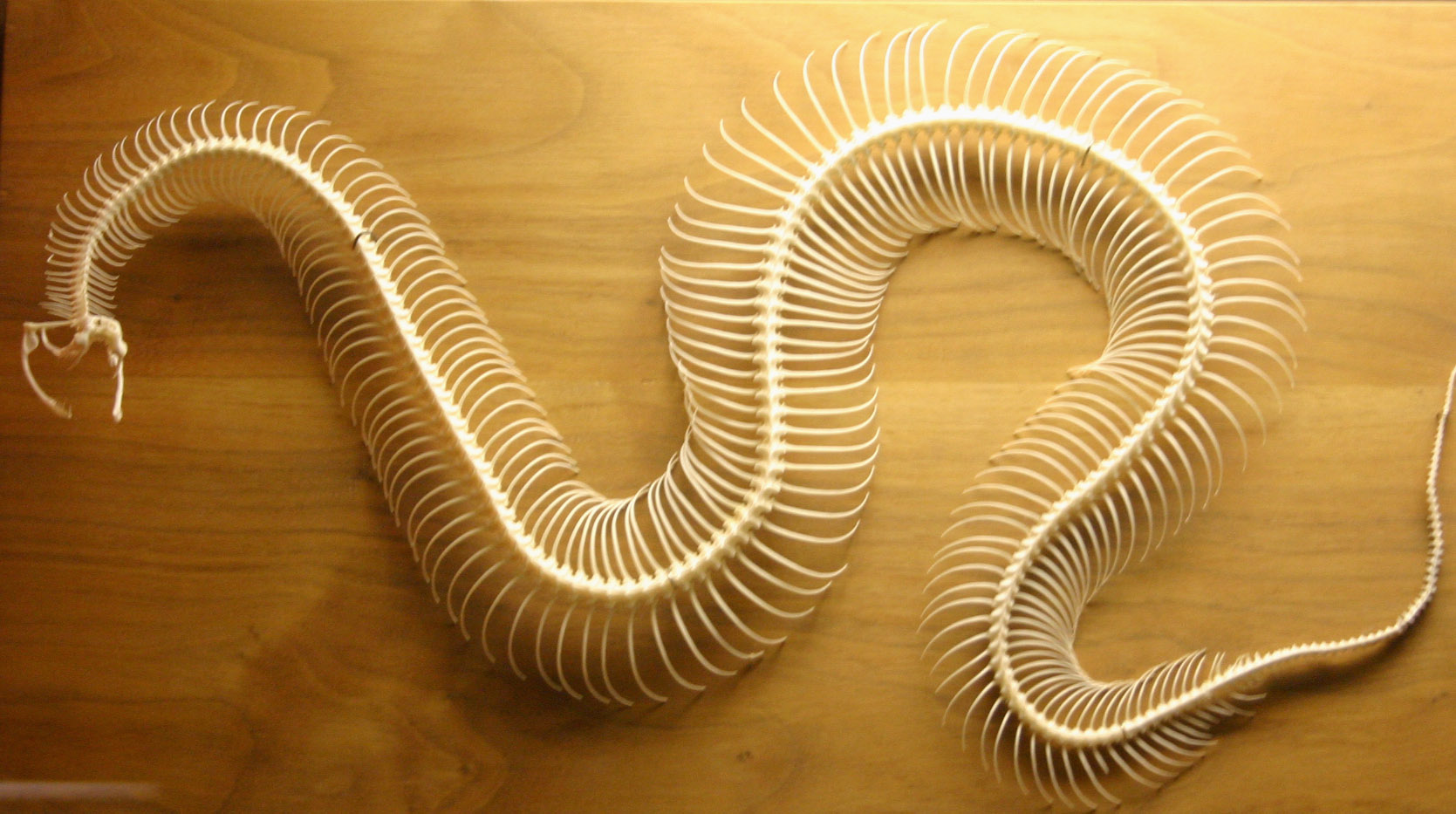
Skeleton of a snake at the Natural History Museum

A snake skeleton consists primarily of the skull, vertebrae, and ribs, with only vestigial remnants of the limbs.

== Skull ==
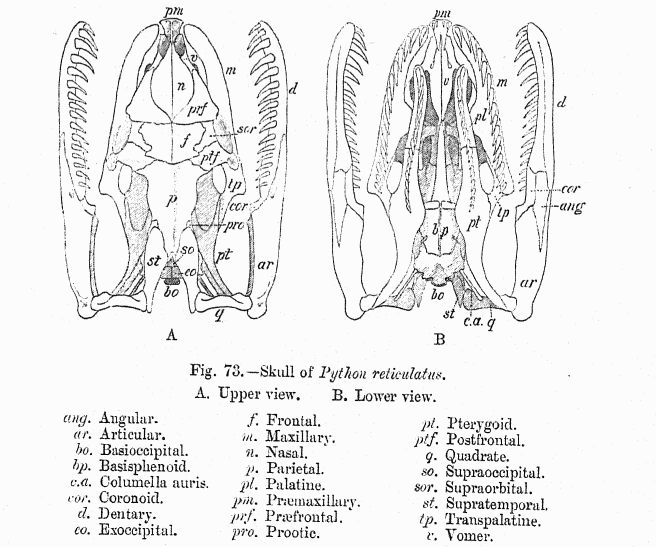
The skull of Python reticulatus.

The skull of a snake is a very complex structure, with numerous joints to allow the snake to swallow prey far larger than its head.

The typical snake skull has a solidly ossified braincase, with the separate frontal bones and the united parietal bones extending downward to the basisphenoid, which is large and extends forward into a rostrum extending to the ethmoidal region. The nose is less ossified, and the paired nasal bones are often attached only at their base. The occipital condyle is either trilobate and formed by the basioccipital and the exoccipitals, or a simple knob formed by the basioccipital; the supraoccipital is excluded from the foramen magnum. The basioccipital may bear a curved ventral process or hypapophysis in the vipers.

The prefrontal bone is situated, on each side, between the frontal bone and the maxilla, and may or may not be in contact with the nasal bone.

The postfrontal bone, usually present, borders the orbit behind, rarely also above, and in the pythons a supraorbital bone is intercalated between it and the prefrontal bone.

The premaxillary bone is single and small and as a rule, connected with the maxillary only by ligament.

The paired vomer is narrow.

The palatine bone and pterygoid are long and parallel to the axis of the skull, the latter diverging behind and extending to the quadrate or to the articular extremity of the mandible; the pterygoid is connected with the maxillary by the ectopterygoid or transverse bone, which may be very long, and the maxillary often emits a process towards the palatine, the latter bone being usually produced inwards and upwards towards the anterior extremity of the basisphenoid.

The quadrate is usually large and elongate, and attached to the cranium through the supratemporal (often regarded as the squamosal).

In rare cases, (Polemon) the transverse bone is forked and articulates with the two branches of the maxilla.

The quadrate and maxillary and palatopterygoid arches are more or less movable to allow for the distension required by the passage of prey, often much exceeding the size of the mouth. For the same reason, the rami of the lower jaw, which consist of dentary, splenial, angular, and articular elements, with the addition of a coronoid in the boas and a few other small families, are connected at the symphysis by a very extensible elastic ligament.

The hyoid apparatus is reduced to a pair of cartilaginous filaments situated below the trachea, and united in front.

There are various modifications according to the genera. A large hole may be present between the frontal bones and the basisphenoid (Psammophis, Coelopeltis); the maxillary may be much abbreviated and movable vertically, as in the Viperidae; the pterygoids may taper and converge posteriorly, without any connection with the quadrate, as in the Amblycephalidae; the supratemporal may be much reduced, and wedged in between the adjacent bones of the cranium; the quadrate may be short or extremely large; the prefrontals may join in a median suture in front of the frontals; the dentary may be freely movable, and detached from the articular posteriorly.

The deviation from the normal type is much greater still when we consider the degraded wormlike members of the families Typhlopidae and Glauconiidae, in which the skull is very compact and the maxillary much reduced. In the former this bone is loosely attached to the lower aspect of the cranium; in the latter, it borders the mouth and is suturally joined to the premaxillary and the prefrontal. Both the transverse bone and the supratemporal are absent, but the coronoid element is present in the mandible.

=== Joints of the snake skull ===
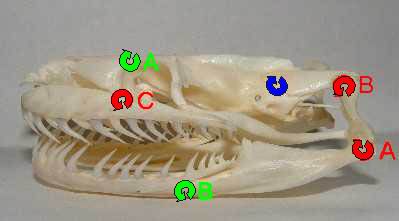
Lateral view of the skull of a Burmese python, with visible kinetic joints labeled. Red = highly mobile, green = slightly mobile, blue = immobile.

- Red A: the joint between the mandible and quadrate. It is analogous to the joint in mammalian jaws.
- Red B: the joint between the quadrate and the supratemporal. It is highly mobile in most directions, allowing a wider gape (i.e., the snake can open its mouth wider) and greater jaw flexibility.
- Red C: the joint between the prefrontal and maxilla. It allows the maxilla to pivot in the plane of the photograph, and while it does not increase gape, it does facilitate the complex action by which the snake draws prey into its mouth.
- Green A: the joint between the frontal bone and nasal bone. It allows the nose to upturn slightly, increasing gape and assisting in swallowing.
- Green B: allows the lower jaws to bow outwards, further increasing the gape.
- Blue: the joint between the supratemporal and parietal. Immobile, except for Dasypeltis.

=== Snake dentition ===
In most snakes, teeth are located on the dentary of the lower jaw, the maxilla of the upper jaw, as is typical of reptiles, with palatal teeth also being present on palatine bone and the lateral pterygoid plate on the roof of the mouth. The latter form an "inner row" of teeth that can move separately from the rest of the jaws and are used to help "walk" the jaws over prey. Several snake lineages have evolved venom which is typically delivered by specialized teeth called fangs located on the maxilla.

Most snakes can be placed into one of four groups, based on their teeth, which correlate strongly with venom and lineage.

==== Aglyph ====
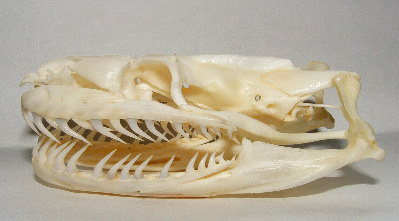
An aglyphous snake. A Burmese python skull (Python bivittatus)

Aglyphous snakes (lacking grooves) have no specialized teeth; each tooth is similar in shape and often size. When teeth vary in size, as in some bird eaters, they do not vary in shape. Most aglyphous snakes are non-venomous; some, like Thamnophis, are considered mildly venomous. The feature is not a synapomorphy.

==== Opisthoglyph ====
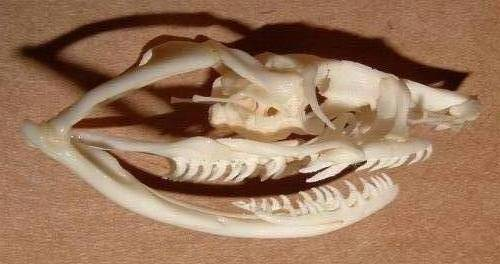
An opisthoglyphous snake. A hognose snake skull (Heterodon nasicus)

Opisthoglyphous ("rearward grooves") snakes possess venom injected by a pair of enlarged teeth at the back of the maxillae, which normally angle backward and are grooved to channel venom into the puncture. Since these teeth are not located at the front of the mouth, this arrangement is vernacularly called "rear-fanged". In order to envenomate prey, an opisthoglyphous snake must move the prey into the rear of its mouth and then penetrate it ith its fangs, presenting difficulties with large prey although they can quickly move smaller prey into position. The opisthoglyphous dentition appears at least two times in the history of snakes. The venom of some opisthoglyphous snakes is strong enough to harm humans although their venom is limited in study; notably, herpetologists Karl Schmidt and Robert Mertens were killed by a boomslang and a twig snake, respectively, after each underestimated the effects of the bite and failed to seek medical help. Opisthoglyphous snakes are found mostly in the families Colubridae and Homalopsidae.

==== Proteroglyph ====
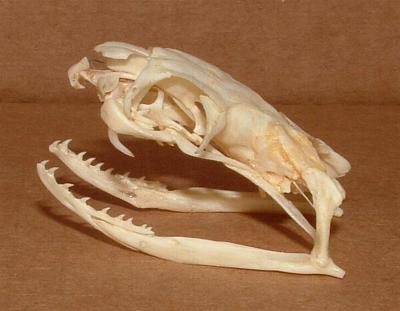
A proteroglyphous snake. A king cobra skull (Ophiophagus hannah)

Proteroglyphous snakes (forward grooved) have shortened maxillae bearing few teeth except for a substantially enlarged fang pointing downwards and completely folded around the venom channel, forming a hollow needle. Because the fangs are only a fraction of an inch long in even the largest species, these snakes must hang on, at least momentarily, as they inject their venom. Some spitting cobras have modified fang tips allowing them to spray venom at an attacker's eyes. This form of dentition is unique to elapids.

==== Solenoglyph ====
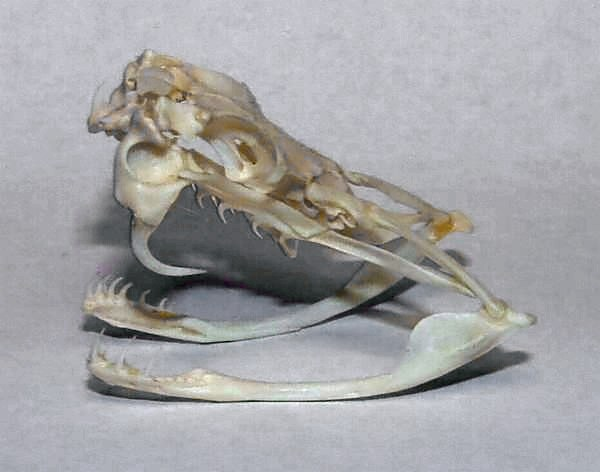
A solenoglyphous snake. A rattlesnake skull (Crotalus sp.)

Solenoglyphous snakes (pipe grooved) have the most advanced venom delivery method of any snake. Each maxilla is reduced to a nub supporting a single hollow tooth. The teeth, which can be as long as half the length of the head, are folded against the roof of the mouth, pointing posteriorly. The skull has a series of interacting elements that ensure that the teeth rotate into biting position when the jaws open. Solenoglyphous snakes open their mouths almost 180 degrees, and the teeth swing into a position to allow them to penetrate deep into the prey. While solenoglyph venom is typically less toxic than that of proteroglyphs, this system allows them to deeply inject large quantities of venom. This form of dentition is unique to vipers.

==== Exceptions ====
A few snakes do not conform to these categories. Atractaspis is solenoglyphous but the fangs swing out sideways, allowing it to strike without opening its mouth, perhaps allowing it to hunt in small tunnels. Scolecophidia (blind burrowing snakes) typically have few teeth, often only in the upper or lower jaw.

==== Informal or popular terminology ====
Common names for the various types of snake dentition originate largely from older literature, but still are encountered in informal publications. Aglyphous snakes are commonly called fangless; opisthoglyphous snakes rear-fanged or back-fanged; and both proteroglyphous and solenoglyphous snakes are referred to as front-fanged.

=== Taxonomic key of skull modifications ===
Modifications of the skull in the European genera:

- I. Quadrate articulating with the cranium, supratemporal absent; mandible much shorter than the skull, with coronoid bone; maxillary small, on lower aspect of cranium; pterygoids not extending to quadrate; nasals forming long sutures with the premaxillary, prefrontals, and frontal: Typhlops.
- II. Quadrate suspended from the supratemporal; mandible at least as long as the skull; pterygoids extending to quadrate or mandible.

- A. Mandible with coronoid bone; nasals in sutural contact with frontals and prefrontals; transverse bone short, not projecting much beyond cranium; maxillary not half as long as mandible, which is not longer than skull (to occiput): Eryx.
- B. No coronoid bone; nasals isolated.

- 1. Maxillary elongate, not movable vertically.

- a. Maxillary half as long as mandible.

- Supratemporal half as long as skull, projecting far beyond cranium; mandible much longer than skull: Tropidonotus.
- Supratemporal not half as long as skull, projecting far beyond cranium; mandible much longer than skull: Zamenis.
- Supratemporal not half as long as skull, projecting but slightly beyond cranium; mandible much longer than skull: Coluber.
- Supratemporal not half as long as skull, not projecting beyond cranium; mandible not longer than skull: Coronella, Contia.

- b. Maxillary not half as long as mandible, which is longer than skull; supratemporal not half as long as skull, projecting beyond cranium.

- Quadrate longer than supratemporal; maxillary much longer than quadrate, nearly straight in front of prefrontal; a large vacuity between the frontal bones and the basisphenoid: Coelopeltis.
- Quadrate not longer than supratemporal; maxillary little longer than quadrate, strongly curved in front of prefrontal:Macroprotodon
- Quadrate longer than supratemporal; maxillary little longer than quadrate, nearly straight in front of prefrontal: Tarbophis

- 2. Maxillary much abbreviated and erectile; supratemporal not half as long as skull; mandible much longer than skull; basioccipital with a strong process.

- Maxillary bone solid: Vipera.
- Maxillary bone hollow: Ancistrodon.
- The vertebrae number 130 to 500 - in the European forms 147 (Vipera ursinii) to 330 (Coluber leopardinus).

== Vertebrae and ribs ==
A snake has from 175 to more than 400 vertebrae in its backbone. The means by which vertebrae are secured are twofold: either a ball and socket joint, or zygopophyses, which stick out from each vertebra to poke rear-pointing projections from the vertebrae ahead of it. This results in a spine well-adapted to the snake's method of movement.

The vertebral column consists of an atlas (composed of two vertebrae) without ribs; numerous precaudal vertebrae, all of which, except the first or first three, bear long, movable, curved ribs with a small posterior tubercle at the base, the last of these ribs sometimes forked; two to ten so-called lumbar vertebrae without ribs, but with bifurcate transverse processes (lymphapophyses) enclosing the lymphatic vessels; and a number of ribless caudal vertebrae with simple transverse processes. When bifid, the ribs or transverse processes have the branches regularly superposed.

The centra have the usual ball and socket joint, with the nearly hemispherical or transversely elliptic condyle at the back (procoelous vertebrae), while the neural arch is provided with additional articular surfaces in the form of pre- and post-zygapophyses, broad, flattened, and overlapping, and of a pair of anterior wedge-shaped processes called zygosphene, fitting into a pair of corresponding concavities, zygantrum, just below the base of the neural spine. Thus the vertebrae of snakes articulate with each other by eight joints in addition to the cup-and-ball on the centrum, and interlock by parts reciprocally receiving and entering one another, like the mortise and tenon joints. The precaudal vertebrae have a more or less high neural spine which, as a rare exception (Xenopholis), may be expanded and plate-like above, and short or moderately long transverse processes to which the ribs are attached by a single facet. The centra of the anterior vertebrae emit more or less developed descending processes, or haemapophyses, which are sometimes continued throughout, as in Tropidonotus, Vipera, and Ancistrodon, among European genera.

In the caudal region, elongate transverse processes take the place of ribs, and the haemapophyses are paired, one on each side of the haemal canal. In the rattlesnakes the seven or eight last vertebrae are enlarged and fused into one.

== Vestigial limbs ==
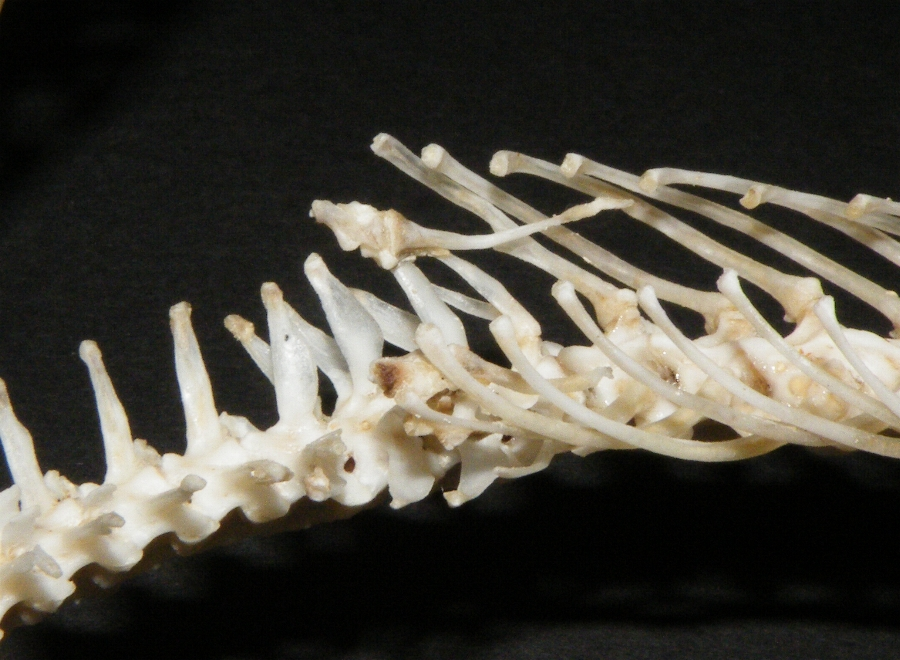
Skeleton of a Boelens python showing the bones inside the anal spurs

No living snake shows any remains of the pectoral arch, but remains of the pelvis are found in:

- Boas and Pythons: a long ilium, attached to the lower branch of the first bifurcate transverse process of the lumbar vertebrae, bearing three short bones, the longest of which, regarded as the femur, terminates in a claw-like pelvic spur which usually appears externally on each side of the cloaca.
- Leptotyphlopidae: ilium, pubis, and ischium, and rudimentary femur, the ischium forming a ventral symphysis.
- Aniliidae
- Typhlopidae: a single bone on each side.
