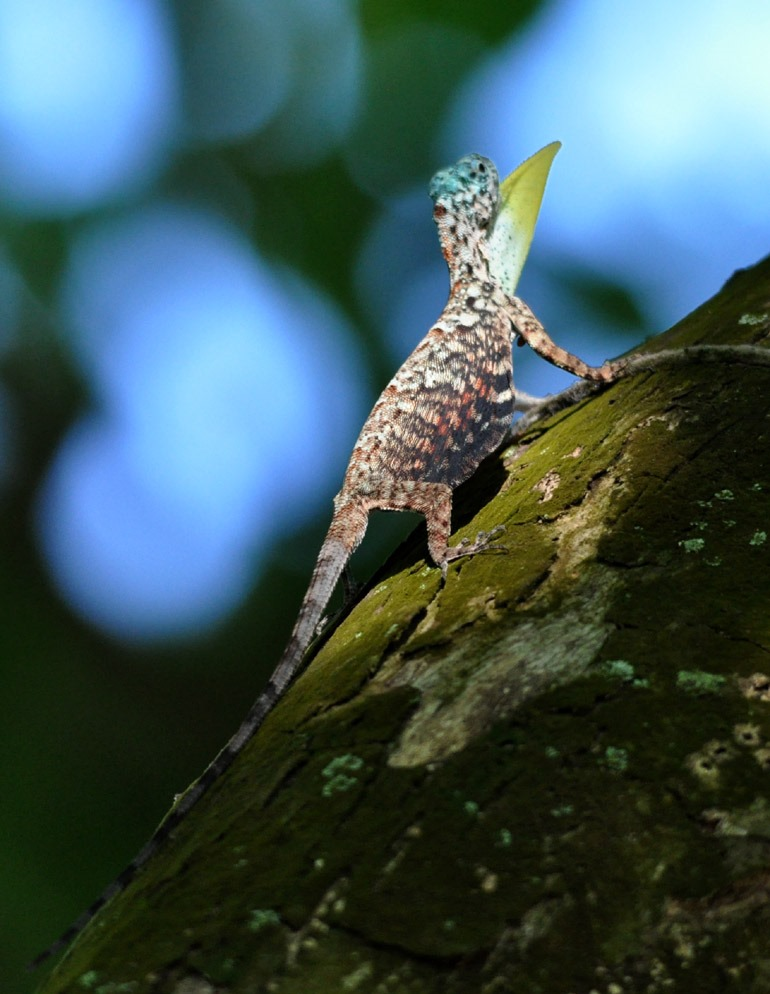
- Common gliding lizard (Draco sumatranus), Singapore

Scientific classification
- Kingdom: Animalia
- Phylum: Chordata
- Class: Reptilia
- Order: Squamata
- Suborder: Iguania
- Family: Agamidae
- Subfamily: Draconinae; Fitzinger, 1826

Genera
- See text

= Draconinae =

Subfamily of lizards

The Draconinae are a subfamily of reptiles in the family Agamidae found in southern Asia and Oceania. Some taxonomists believe these genera belong to the subfamily Agaminae.

== Genera ==
The subfamily includes the following genera:

Genus	Common name	Species	Images
Acanthosaura	mountain horned dragons	20	A. cardamomensis
Agasthyagama	Indian kangaroo lizard	2	A. beddomii
Aphaniotis	earless agamas	3	A. acutirostris
Bronchocela	Southeast Asian green forest lizards	15	B. cristatella
Calotes	garden lizards, bloodsuckers, and forest lizards	30	C. calotes
Ceratophora	horned lizards	6	C. aspera
Complicitus	blackthroated bloodsucker	1	
Cophotis		2	C. ceylanica
Cristidorsa	ridged dragons	2	C. otai
Dendragama	tree agamas	4	D. boulengeri
Diploderma		47	D. swinhonis
Draco	'flying' dragons, or gliding lizards	41	D. taeniopterus
Gonocephalus		17	G. grandis
Harpesaurus	nose-horned lizards	6	H. modiglianii
Hypsicalotes	Kinabalu crested agama	1	H. kinabaluensis
Japalura	japalures	8	J. variegata
Laodracon Brakels, Sitthivong, Wang, Nguyen & Poyarkov, 2023	Laos karst dragon	1	
Lophocalotes	Sumatra crested agamas	2	L. ludekingi
Lyriocephalus (Linnaeus, 1758)	hump-nosed lizard, lyreshead lizard	1	L. scutatus
Malayodracon	Robinson's anglehead lizard	1	
Mantheyus Manthey & Nabhitabhata, 1991	Phuwua rock agama	1	M. phuwuanensis
Microauris (Pal et al., 2018)	small-eared dragon	1	
Monilesaurus		4	M. rouxii
Otocryptis		2	O. nigristigma
Pelturagonia	eyebrowed agamas	5	P. nigrilabris
Phoxophyrs Hubrecht, 1881	Hubrecht's eyebrow lizard	1	P. tuberculata
Psammophilus		2	P. dorsalis
Pseudocalotes	false bloodsuckers	23	P. floweri
Pseudocophotis		2	
Ptyctolaemus		3	P. gularis
Salea		2	S. anamallayana
Sarada	large fan-throated lizards	3	S. superba
Sitana	fan-throated lizards	15	S. marudhamneydhal
†Tikiguania			
