= Lophocalotes achlios =

Conservation status
- Least Concern (IUCN 3.1)

Scientific classification
- Kingdom: Animalia
- Phylum: Chordata
- Class: Reptilia
- Order: Squamata
- Suborder: Iguania
- Family: Agamidae
- Genus: Lophocalotes
- Species: L. achlios

Binomial name
- Lophocalotes achlios Harvey, Scrivani, Shaney, Hamidy, Kurniawan & E.N. Smith, 2018

Species of lizard

Lophocalotes achlios, also known commonly as the white-throated crested dragon, is a species of lizard in the subfamily Draconinae of the family Agamidae. The species is endemic to Sumatra, Indonesia.

== Habitat ==
The preferred natural habitat of Lophocalotes achlios is misty cloud forest, above 1,000 m (3,300 ft) altitude.

== Behavior ==
Lophocalotes achlios is arboreal and slow-moving.

== Diet ==
Lophocalotes achlios is a generalist predator.

== Reproduction ==
Lophocalotes achlios is oviparous. Clutch size is 2–6 eggs.
