= Pelturagonia borneensis =

Conservation status
- Least Concern (IUCN 3.1)

Scientific classification
- Kingdom: Animalia
- Phylum: Chordata
- Class: Reptilia
- Order: Squamata
- Suborder: Iguania
- Family: Agamidae
- Genus: Pelturagonia
- Species: P. borneensis

Binomial name
- Pelturagonia borneensis Inger, 1960

Species of lizard

Pelturagonia borneensis, the Sabah eyebrow lizard, is a species of agamid lizard. It is endemic to Indonesia.
