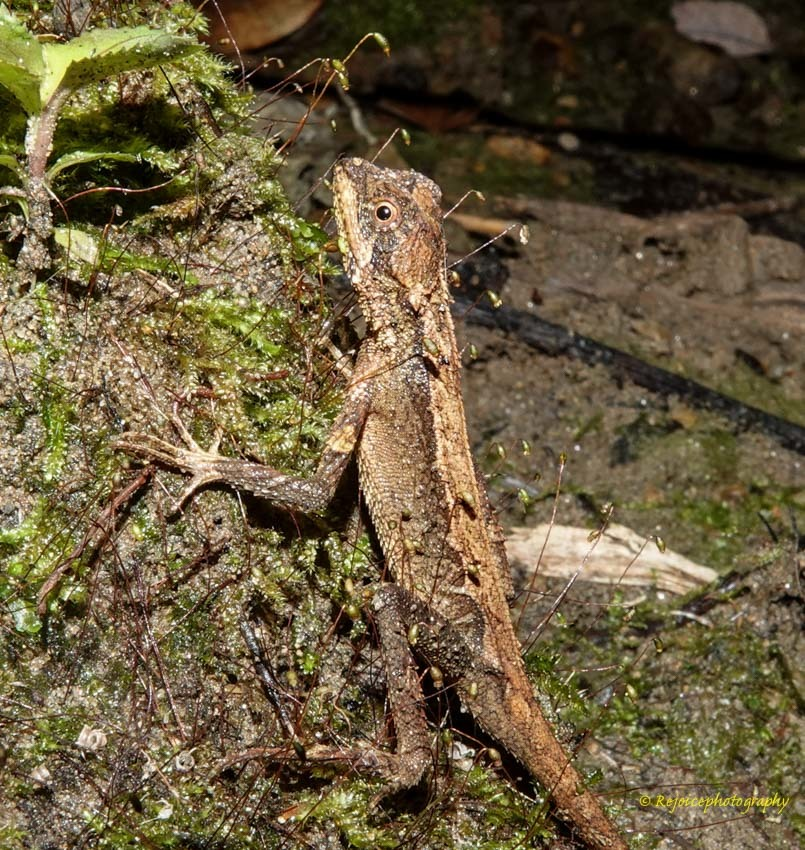

Scientific classification
- Kingdom: Animalia
- Phylum: Chordata
- Class: Reptilia
- Order: Squamata
- Suborder: Iguania
- Family: Agamidae
- Genus: Cristidorsa
- Species: C. planidorsata

Binomial name
- Cristidorsa planidorsata Jerdon, 1870

Synonyms
- Japalura planidorsata

= Smooth-scaled mountain lizard =

Species of lizard

The smooth-scaled mountain lizard (Cristidorsa planidorsata) is an agamid lizard found in Myanmar and northeast India.
