= Pelturagonia anolophium =

Scientific classification
- Kingdom: Animalia
- Phylum: Chordata
- Class: Reptilia
- Order: Squamata
- Suborder: Iguania
- Family: Agamidae
- Genus: Pelturagonia
- Species: P. anolophium

Binomial name
- Pelturagonia anolophium Harvey, Larson, Jacobs, Shaney, Streicher, Hamidy, Kurniawan, & Smith, 2019

Species of lizard

Pelturagonia anolophium is a species of agamid lizard. It is endemic to Indonesia.
