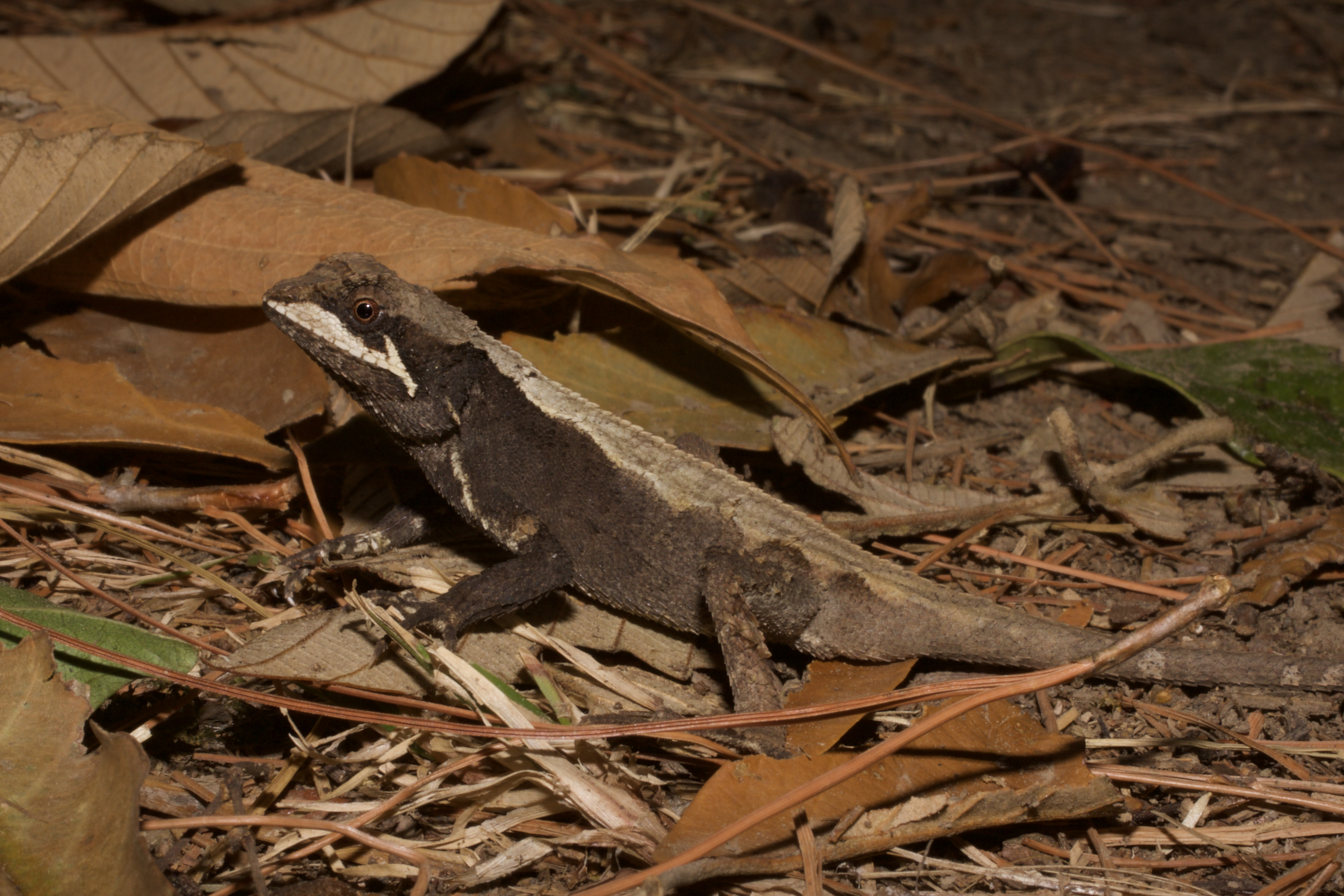
- Cristidorsa otai

Scientific classification
- Kingdom: Animalia
- Phylum: Chordata
- Class: Reptilia
- Order: Squamata
- Suborder: Iguania
- Family: Agamidae
- Genus: Cristidorsa
- Species: C. otai

Binomial name
- Cristidorsa otai (Mahony, 2009)

Synonyms
- Japalura otai Mahony, 2009; Cristidorsa otai — K. Wang et al., 2018

= Ota's mountain lizard =

Species of lizard

Ota's mountain lizard (Cristidorsa otai) is a species of lizard in the subfamily Draconinae of the family Agamidae. The species is native to Southern Asia.

== Etymology ==
The specific name, otai, is in honor of Japanese herpetologist Hidetoshi Ota (born 1959).

== Geographic distribution ==
Cristidorsa otai is endemic to Mizoram state in northeastern India.

== Description ==
Adult males of Cristidorsa otai have a snout-to-vent length (SVL) of 46.4 mm (1.83 in). Females are larger, at 52.2–58.7 mm (2.06–2.31 in) SVL.
