= Pseudocophotis sumatrana =

Conservation status
- Data Deficient (IUCN 3.1)

Scientific classification
- Kingdom: Animalia
- Phylum: Chordata
- Class: Reptilia
- Order: Squamata
- Suborder: Iguania
- Family: Agamidae
- Genus: Pseudocophotis
- Species: P. sumatrana

Binomial name
- Pseudocophotis sumatrana (Hubrecht, 1879)
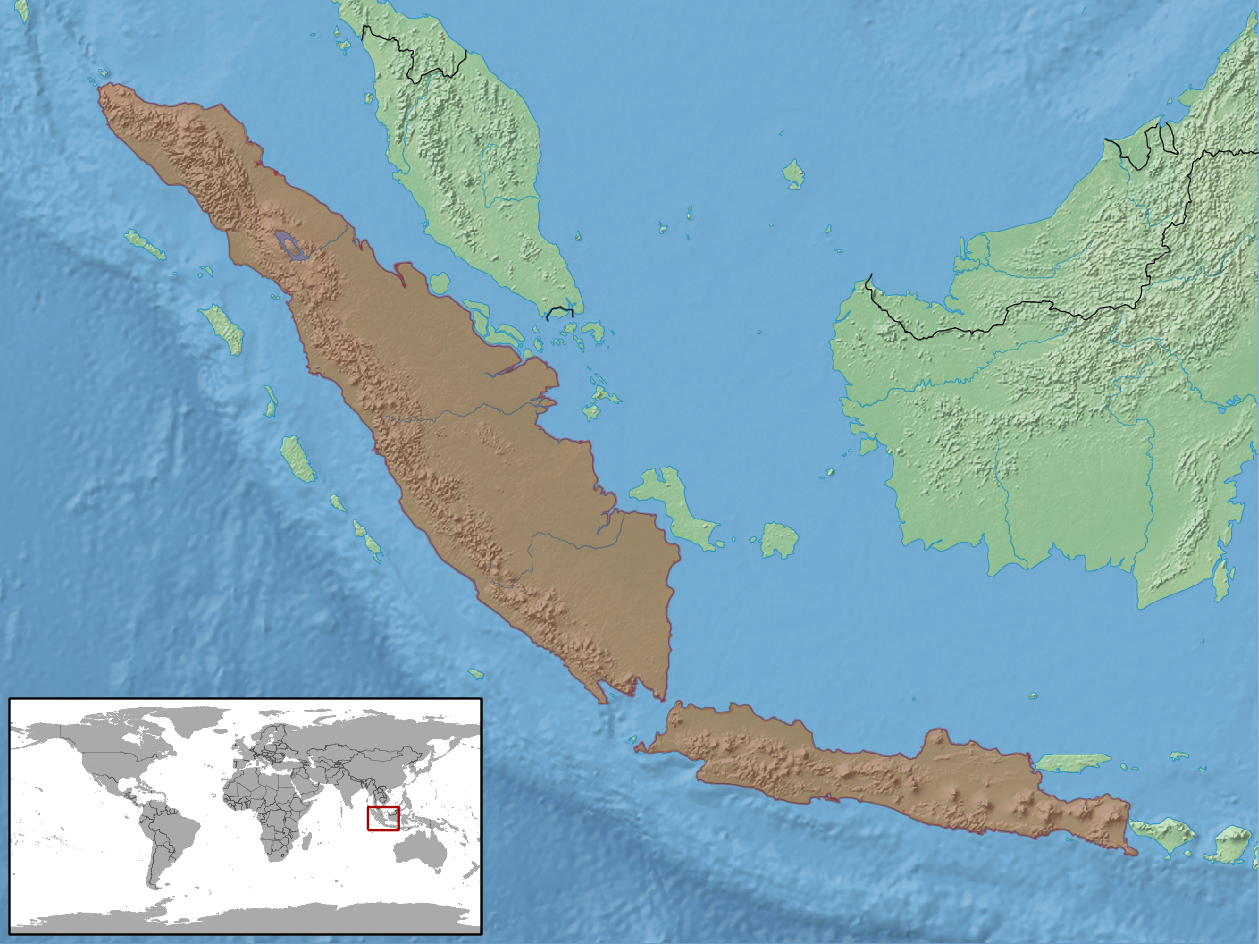

Species of lizard

Pseudocophotis sumatrana is a species of agamid lizard. It is endemic to Indonesia.
