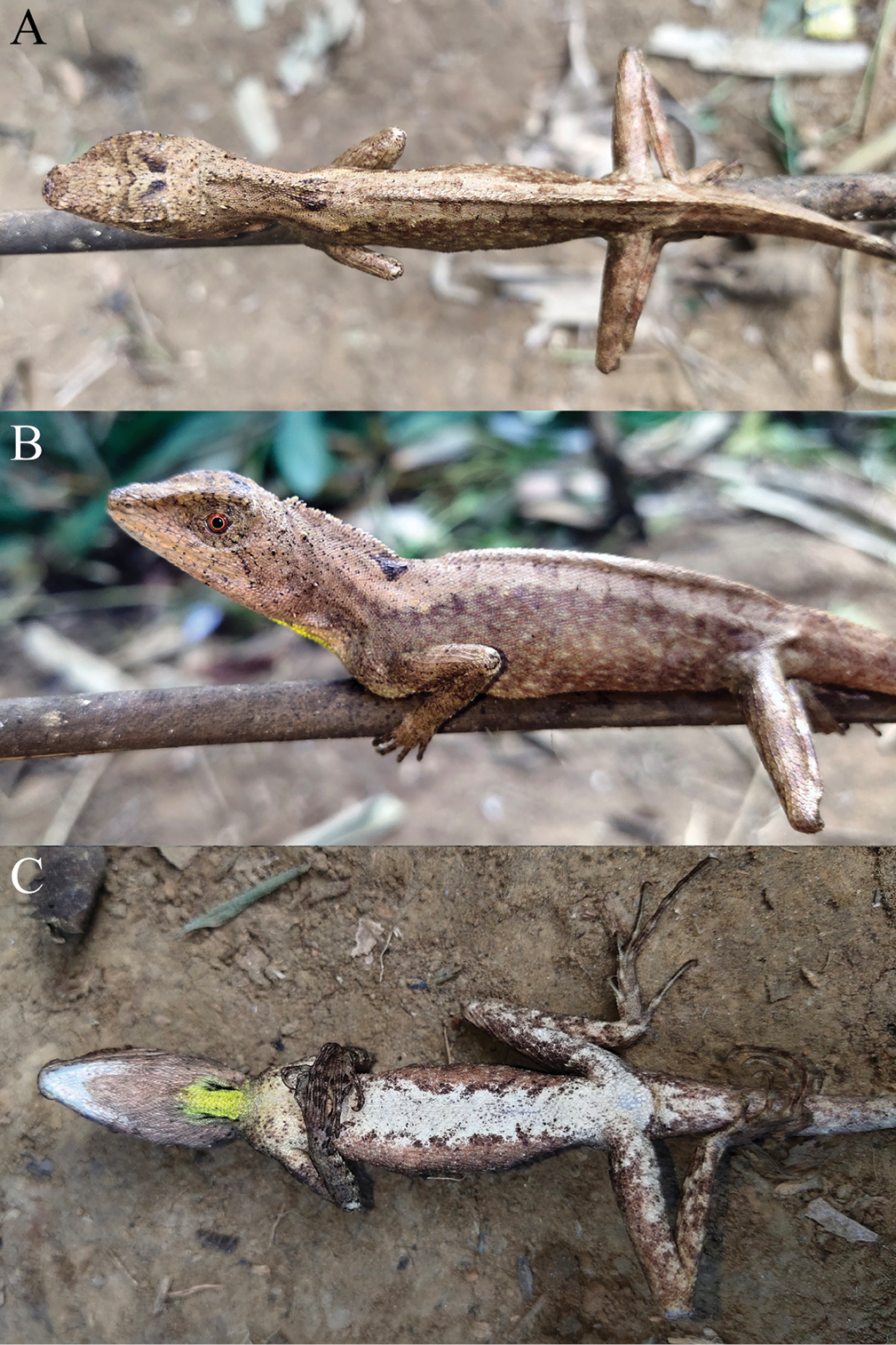

Scientific classification
- Kingdom: Animalia
- Phylum: Chordata
- Class: Reptilia
- Order: Squamata
- Suborder: Iguania
- Family: Agamidae
- Genus: Ptyctolaemus
- Species: P. chindwinensis

Binomial name
- Ptyctolaemus chindwinensis Liu, Hou, Lwin, & Rao, 2021

= Ptyctolaemus chindwinensis =

Species of lizard

Ptyctolaemus chindwinensis is a species of agamid lizard. It is endemic to Myanmar.

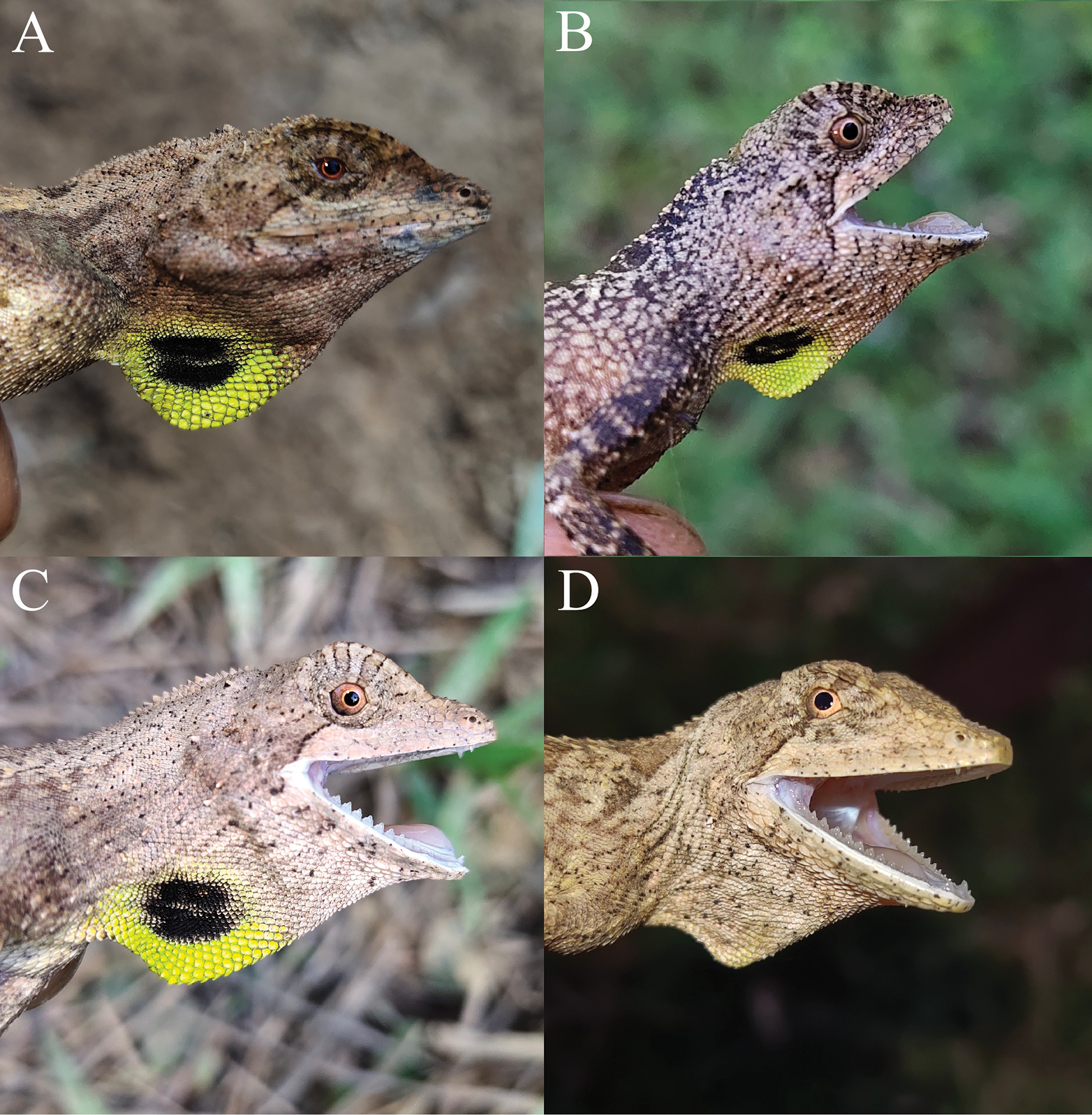
Male (A-C) and female (D)
