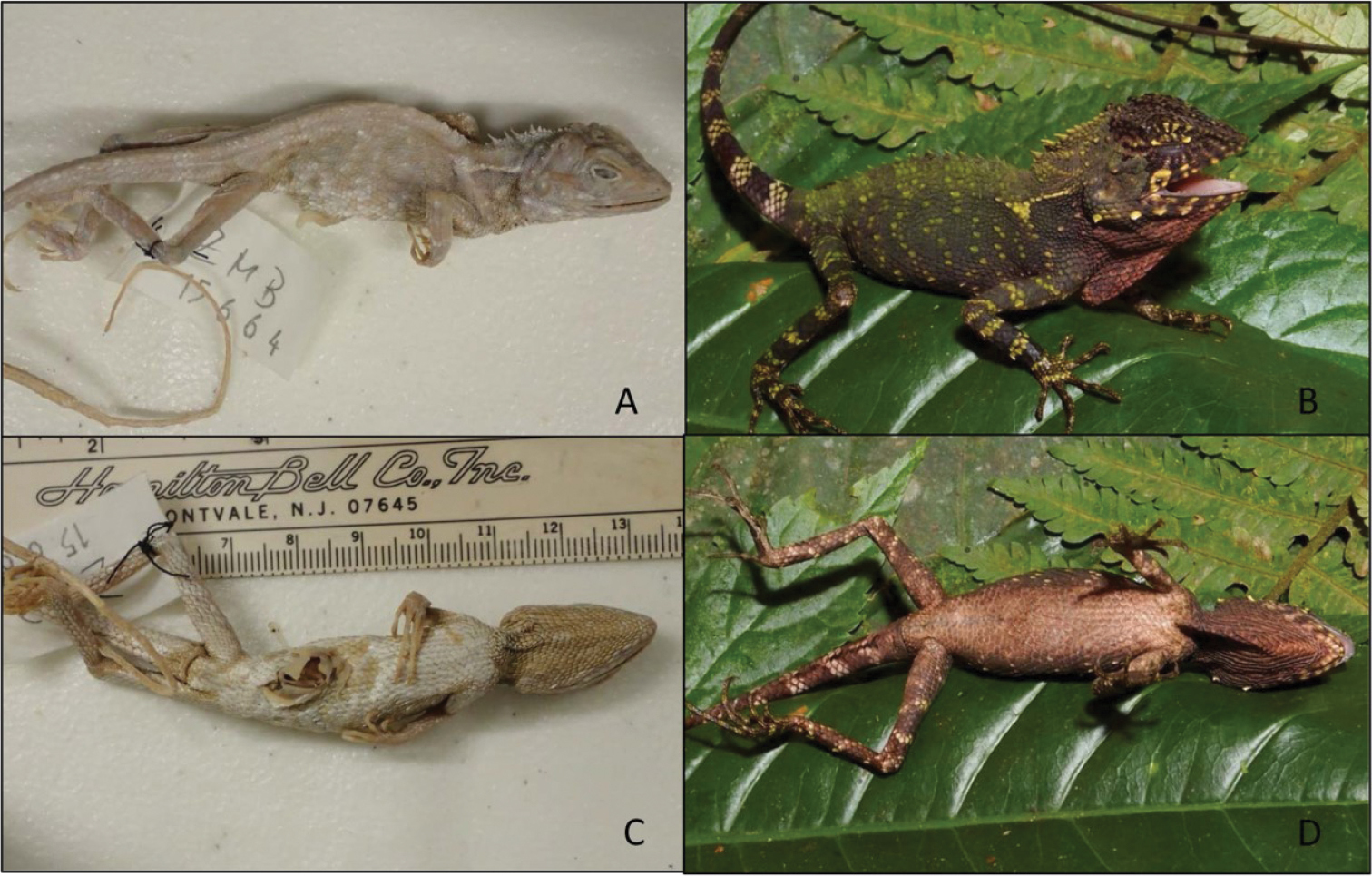

Scientific classification
- Kingdom: Animalia
- Phylum: Chordata
- Class: Reptilia
- Order: Squamata
- Suborder: Iguania
- Family: Agamidae
- Genus: Dendragama
- Species: D. schneideri

Binomial name
- Dendragama schneideri (Ahl, 1926)

Synonyms
- Acanthosaura schneideri Ahl, 1926

= Dendragama schneideri =

Species of lizard

Dendragama schneideri, also known commonly as Schneider's tree agama, is a species of lizard in the family Agamidae. The species is endemic to Sumatra.
