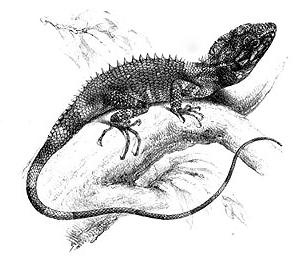

Conservation status
- Least Concern (IUCN 3.1)

Scientific classification
- Kingdom: Animalia
- Phylum: Chordata
- Class: Reptilia
- Order: Squamata
- Suborder: Iguania
- Family: Agamidae
- Genus: Lophocalotes
- Species: L. ludekingi

Binomial name
- Lophocalotes ludekingi (Bleeker, 1860)

Synonyms
- Calotes ludekingi Bleeker, 1860; Lophocalotes interruptus Günther, 1872; Lophocalotes Luedekingii [sic] — Boulenger, 1887; Lophocalotes ludekingi — de Rooij, 1915

= Lophocalotes ludekingi =

Species of lizard

Lophocalotes ludekingi, called commonly the crested lizard, is a species of lizard in the subfamily Draconinae of the family Agamidae. The species is endemic to Sumatra, Indonesia.

== Etymology ==
The specific name, ludekingi, is in honor of Dutch physician E.W.A. Ludeking, who collected specimens for the Rijksmuseum van Natuurlijke Historie, Leiden.

== Description ==
Dorsally, Lophocalotes ludekingi is green, with darker crossbands. It may have some irregular red markings on the head.

== Habitat ==
The preferred natural habitat of Lophocalotes ludekingi is forest, at altitudes of 1,000–3,000 m (3,300–9,800 ft).

== Behavior ==
Lophocalotes ludekingi is arboreal and diurnal.

== Reproduction ==
Lophocalotes ludekingi is oviparous.
