= Pelturagonia cephalum =

Conservation status
- Least Concern (IUCN 3.1)

Scientific classification
- Kingdom: Animalia
- Phylum: Chordata
- Class: Reptilia
- Order: Squamata
- Suborder: Iguania
- Family: Agamidae
- Genus: Pelturagonia
- Species: P. cephalum

Binomial name
- Pelturagonia cephalum (Mocquard, 1890)

Species of lizard

Pelturagonia cephalum, Mocquard's eyebrow lizard, is a species of agamid lizard. It is endemic to Indonesia.
