= Ptyctolaemus collicristatus =

Conservation status
- Least Concern (IUCN 3.1)

Scientific classification
- Kingdom: Animalia
- Phylum: Chordata
- Class: Reptilia
- Order: Squamata
- Suborder: Iguania
- Family: Agamidae
- Genus: Ptyctolaemus
- Species: P. collicristatus

Binomial name
- Ptyctolaemus collicristatus Schulte & Vindum, 2004

Species of lizard

Ptyctolaemus collicristatus is a species of agamid lizard. It is endemic to Myanmar.
