= Pseudocophotis kontumensis =

Conservation status
- Data Deficient (IUCN 3.1)

Scientific classification
- Kingdom: Animalia
- Phylum: Chordata
- Class: Reptilia
- Order: Squamata
- Suborder: Iguania
- Family: Agamidae
- Genus: Pseudocophotis
- Species: P. kontumensis

Binomial name
- Pseudocophotis kontumensis Ananjeva, Orlov, Truong, & Nazarov, 2007

Species of lizard

Pseudocophotis kontumensis is a species of agamid lizard. It is endemic to Vietnam.
