= Dendragama australis =

Scientific classification
- Kingdom: Animalia
- Phylum: Chordata
- Class: Reptilia
- Order: Squamata
- Suborder: Iguania
- Family: Agamidae
- Genus: Dendragama
- Species: D. australis

Binomial name
- Dendragama australis Harvey, Shaney, Sidik, Kurniawan & E.N. Smith, 2017

Species of lizard

Dendragama australis is a species of lizard in the family Agamidae. The species is endemic to Sumatra.
