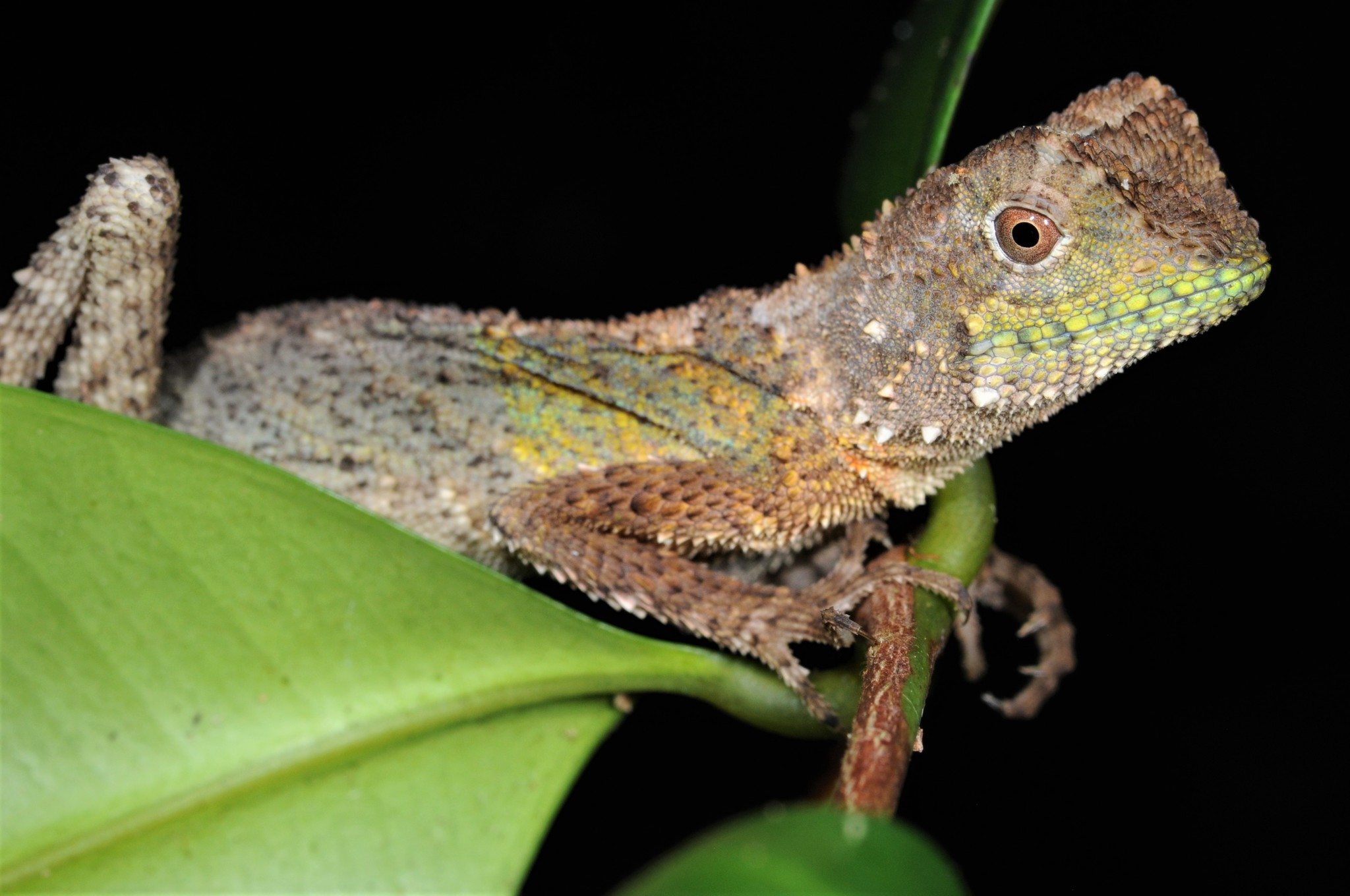
- P. nigrilabris

Scientific classification
- Kingdom: Animalia
- Phylum: Chordata
- Class: Reptilia
- Order: Squamata
- Suborder: Iguania
- Family: Agamidae
- Subfamily: Draconinae
- Genus: Pelturagonia; Harvey, Larson, Jacobs, Shaney, Streicher, Hamidy, Kurniawan, & Smith, 2019

Diversity
- Five species (see text)

= Pelturagonia =

Genus of lizards

Pelturagonia is a genus of lizards within the family Agamidae. The species are distributed in Sumatra and Borneo. All species were previously listed under the genus Phoxophrys.

== Description ==
The genus Pelturagonia closely resembles the genus Japalura but differs in a number of characters, for example by the absence of a dorsal crest, and by having a relatively shorter and deeper head. Male Pelturagonia have a tail that is swollen basally and is flattened above, whereas females have a cylindrical tail.

== Species ==
The genus Pelturagonia contains the following five species which are recognized as being valid.

- Pelturagonia anolophium Harvey, Larson, Jacobs, Shaney, Streicher, Hamidy, Kurniawan, & Smith, 2019
- Pelturagonia borneensis Inger, 1960 - Sabah eyebrow lizard
- Pelturagonia cephalum (Mocquard, 1890) - Mocquard's eyebrow lizard
- Pelturagonia nigrilabris (W. Peters, 1864) - Blacklipped eyebrow lizard
- Pelturagonia spiniceps M.A. Smith, 1925 - Sarawak eyebrow lizard

Nota bene: A binomial authority in parentheses indicates that the species was originally described in a genus other than Pelturagonia.
