= Cryptagama =

Conservation status
- Data Deficient (IUCN 3.1)

Scientific classification
- Kingdom: Animalia
- Phylum: Chordata
- Class: Reptilia
- Order: Squamata
- Suborder: Iguania
- Family: Agamidae
- Genus: Cryptagama; Witten, 1984
- Species: C. aurita

Binomial name
- Cryptagama aurita (Storr, 1981)
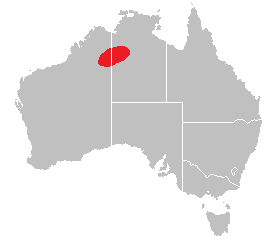
- Distribution of Cryptagama aurita

Synonyms
- Amphibolurus auritus (Storr, 1981); Tympanocryptis aurita (Storr, 1981)

Species of lizard

Cryptagama aurita, commonly known as the gravel dragon or hidden dragon, is a species of agamid lizard occurring in the arid north-eastern interior of Western Australia and the adjacent area of the Northern Territory. Cryptagama aurita is the only species in its genus.

== Description ==
Adult Cryptagama aurita are very squat, with short limbs with a blunt-tipped tail that is shorter than its body. They range in colour from pale reddish brown to brick red, with pale brownish grey on its head and back. They reach a total length (including tail) of about 7.4 cm (2.9 in). Living in areas of spinifex and gibber plains, they have evolved to mimic the look of a gibber stone.
