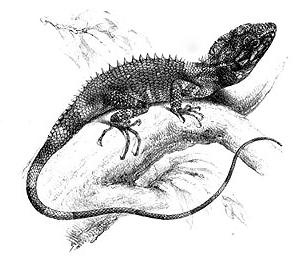
- Lophocalotes ludekingi

Scientific classification
- Kingdom: Animalia
- Phylum: Chordata
- Class: Reptilia
- Order: Squamata
- Suborder: Iguania
- Family: Agamidae
- Subfamily: Draconinae
- Genus: Lophocalotes; Günther, 1872

= Lophocalotes =

Genus of lizards

Lophocalotes is a genus of lizards in the subfamily Draconinae of the family Agamidae. The genus, which is endemic to Sumatra, contains two species.

== Species ==
The following two species are recognized as being valid.

- Lophocalotes achlios Harvey, Scrivani, Shaney, Hamidy, Kurniawan & E.N. Smith, 2018 – white-throated crested dragon
- Lophocalotes ludekingi (Bleeker, 1860) – crested lizard

Nota bene: A binomial authority in parentheses indicates that the species was originally described in a genus other than Lophocalotes.
