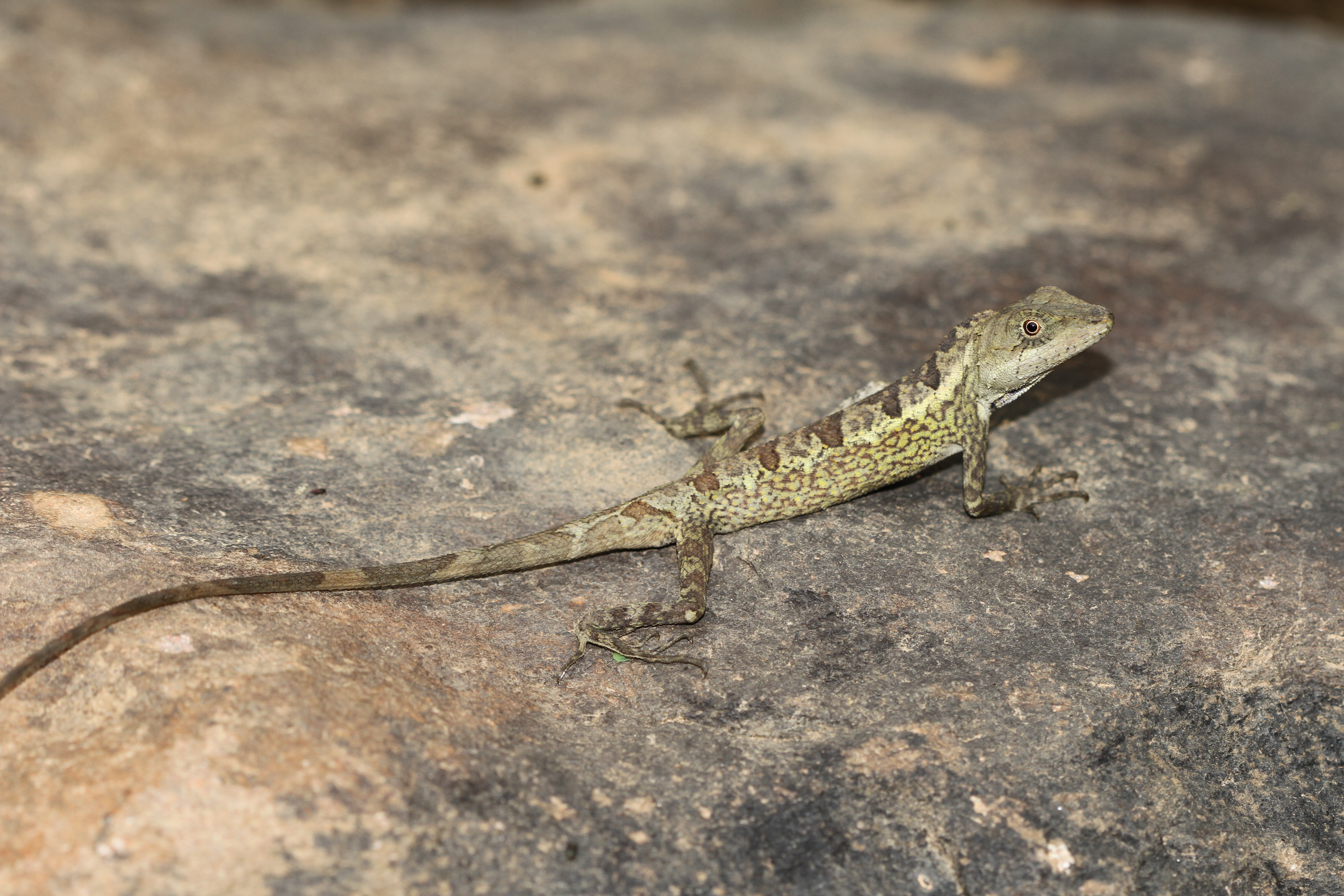
- Ptyctolaemus gularis

Scientific classification
- Kingdom: Animalia
- Phylum: Chordata
- Class: Reptilia
- Order: Squamata
- Suborder: Iguania
- Family: Agamidae
- Subfamily: Draconinae
- Genus: Ptyctolaemus; Peters, 1864

= Ptyctolaemus =

Genus of lizards

Ptyctolaemus is a genus of agamid lizards from southern Asia.

== Species ==
There are seven species:

Image	Scientific name	Common name	Distribution
	Ptyctolaemus chindwinensis Liu, Hou, Lwin, & Rao, 2021		Myanmar
	Ptyctolaemus collicristatus Schulte & Vindum, 2004		Myanmar
	Ptyctolaemus gularis (Peters, 1864)	green fan-throated lizard	Bangladesh, China (Tibet), India (Northeast- Arunachal Pradesh, Assam, Tripura, Khasi Hills, Mizoram) and Myanmar (Kachin, Chin), and possibly in Bhutan
	Ptyctolaemus kachinensis Deepak, 2026		Kachin State, Myanmar
	Ptyctolaemus namdaphaensis Balan, Das, Boruah, Tillack, Lalronunga & Deepak, 2025	Namdapha green fan-throated lizard	Arunachal Pradesh, India
	Ptyctolaemus siangensis Balan, Das, Boruah, Tillack, Lalronunga & Deepak, 2025	Siang green fan-throated lizard	Arunachal Pradesh, India; Medog, China
	Ptyctolaemus tongbiguanensis (Liu, Zhu, Hou, Duan, Zuo, Yin & Rao, 2026)	Tongbiguan fan-throated lizard	Dehong Dai and Jingpo Autonomous Prefecture, Yunnan Province, China
