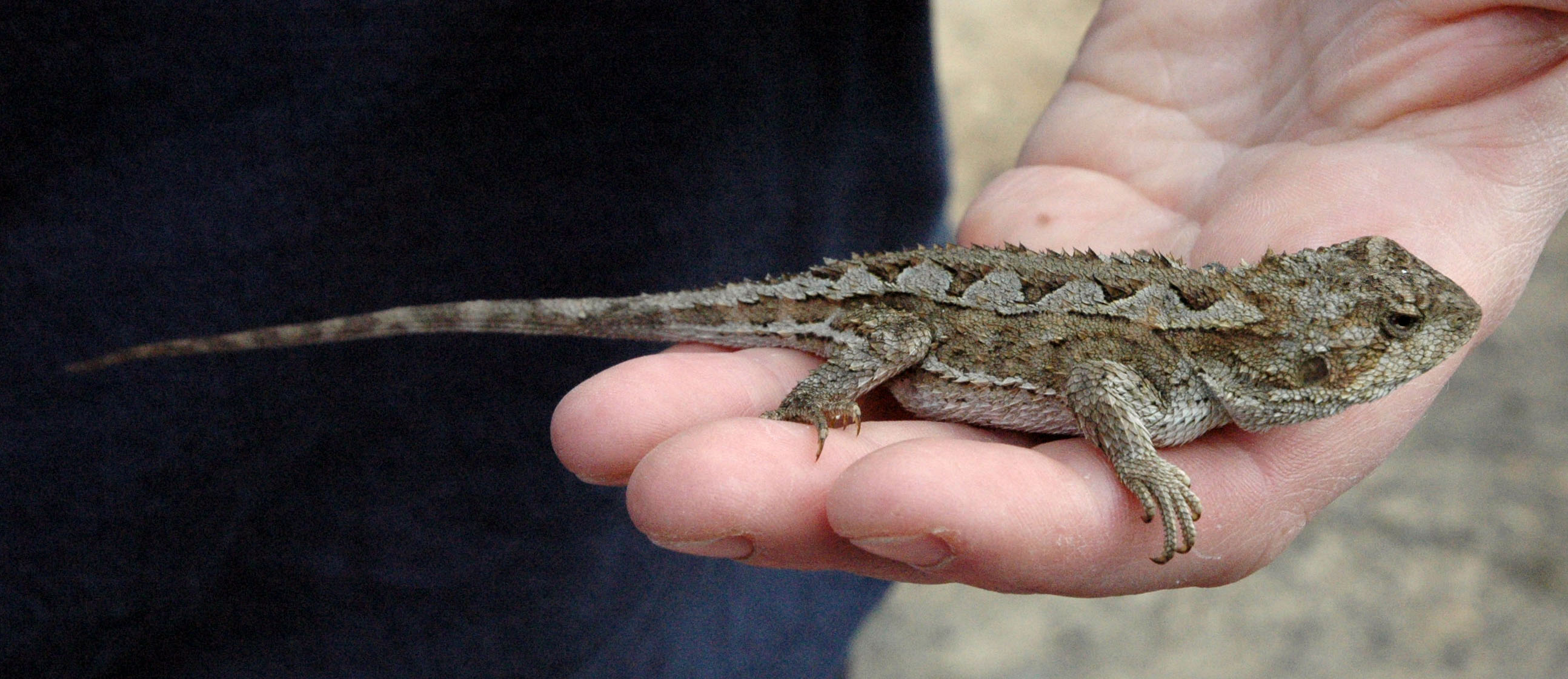
- Rankinia diemensis

Conservation status
- Least Concern (IUCN 3.1)

Scientific classification
- Kingdom: Animalia
- Phylum: Chordata
- Class: Reptilia
- Order: Squamata
- Suborder: Iguania
- Family: Agamidae
- Genus: Rankinia
- Species: R. diemensis

Binomial name
- Rankinia diemensis Wells & Wellington, 1984
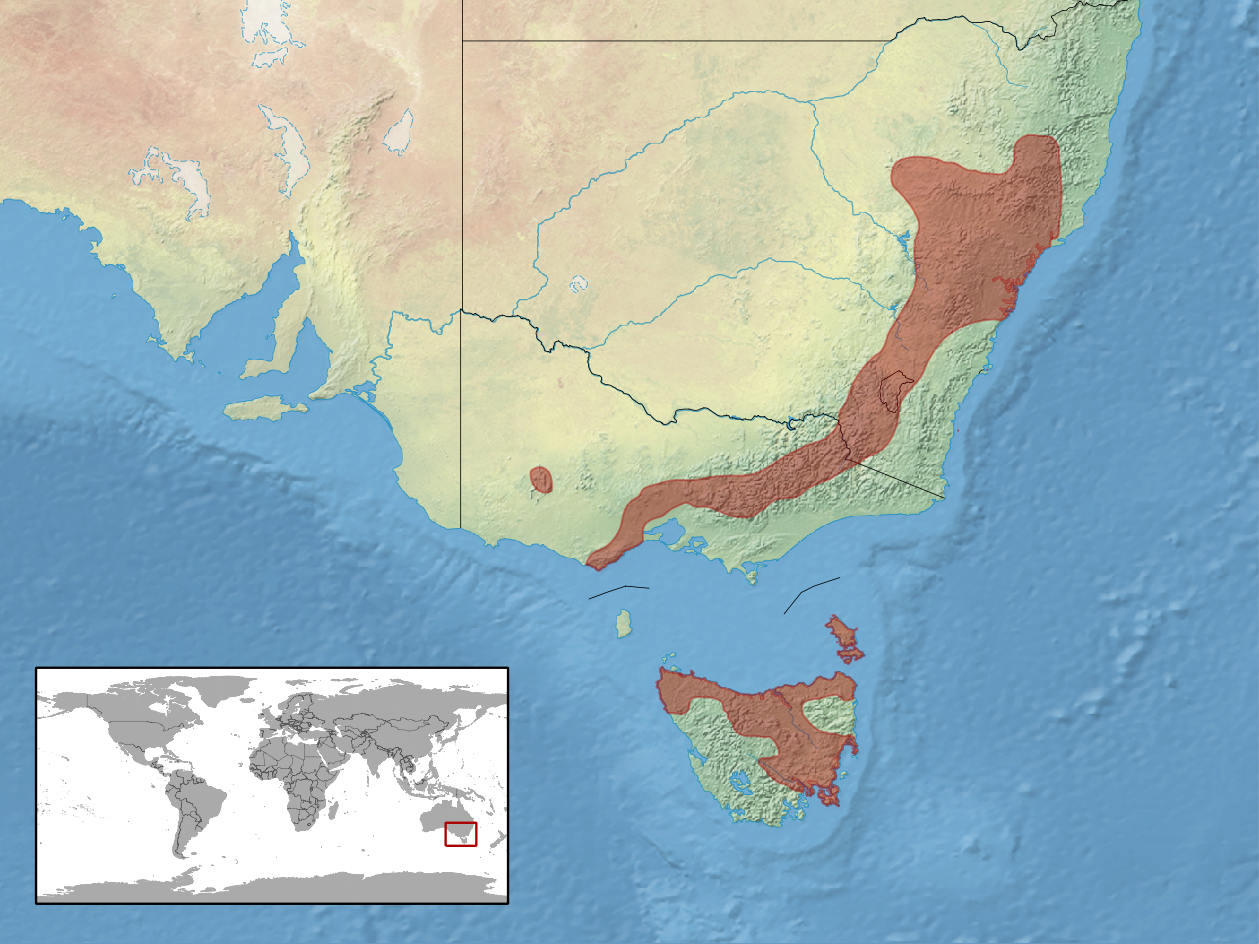

Synonyms
- Grammatophora muricata diemensis Gray, 1841

= Rankinia =

Genus of reptiles in Australia

Rankinia is a genus of small agamid reptiles. As currently delineated, it is monotypic, containing only Rankinia diemensis (Gray, 1841), also known as the mountain heath dragon or mountain dragon. It is endemic to Australia.

== Distribution and habitat ==
It occurs in the uplands of New South Wales and Victoria, as well as in Tasmania, where it is the only native agamid. Mountain dragons are found in dry woodlands and heaths with access to open areas for sunning themselves. They are oviparous and feed on ants and other small invertebrates.

They do not climb very high, relying instead on camouflage to evade predators.

== Description ==
Their overall colour is grey to reddish brown, with two rows of lighter-coloured paravertebral stripes or blotches running down their backs. These stripes are deeply scalloped, so they appear like two series of blotches. They can have cream-coloured bellies. Individuals can grow up to 20 cm in length, although the average length is somewhat smaller, with females typically growing larger than males. The average snout to base of tail length is 7.5 centimeters, but can be up to 9. They have a row of enlarged spinose (spikey) scales on each side of the tail bases.

The mountain dragon appears similar to the jacky dragon, but can be much redder, and the inside of its mouth is pink (compared to the yellow of the jacky dragon).

They breed in summer, laying 2–9 eggs in a burrow.
