= Chelosania =

Conservation status
- Data Deficient (IUCN 3.1)

Scientific classification
- Kingdom: Animalia
- Phylum: Chordata
- Order: Squamata
- Suborder: Iguania
- Family: Agamidae
- Genus: Chelosania; Gray, 1845
- Species: C. brunnea

Binomial name
- Chelosania brunnea Gray, 1845

Genus of lizards

Chelosania is a genus of agamid lizards that contains a single species, Chelosania brunnea. These are commonly known as the chameleon dragon. They live in the northern parts of West Australia, the Northern Territory, and northwestern Queensland.

Chelosania has short limbs with a laterally compressed body, and small eye apertures and large ear openings. They have an average snout to vent length of 11.8 cm, and average total length of 30 cm.

Chelosania is usually seen on the ground or in low level vegetation, and is slow moving. Females lay eggs in burrows between July and August, with up to 8 eggs recorded. Chelosania eats ants, and has been recorded eating green ants.

Genetic analysis shows that Chelosania, along with the thorny devil, is a significantly older species than more recent desert agamids.
