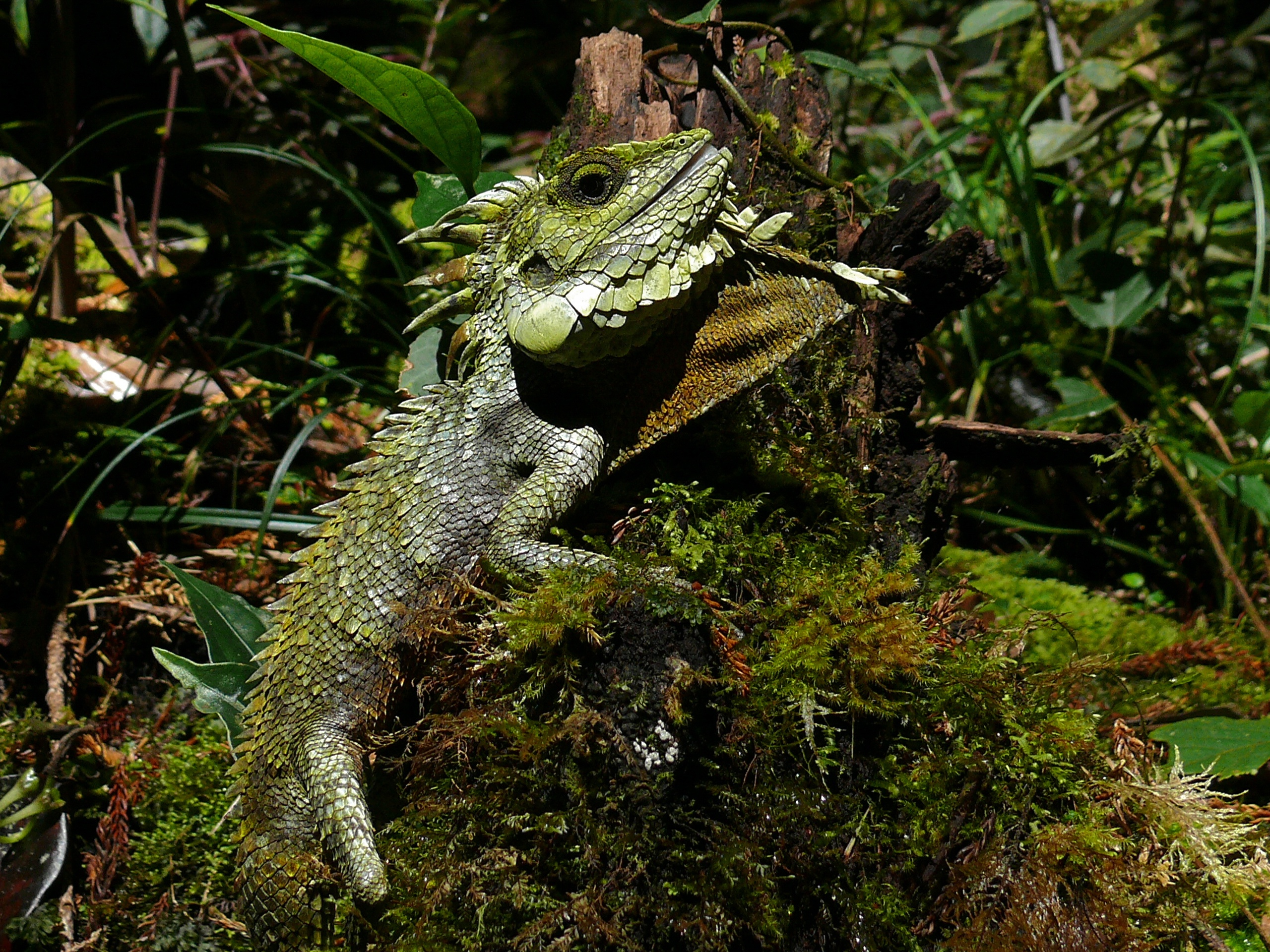

Conservation status
- Data Deficient (IUCN 3.1)

Scientific classification
- Kingdom: Animalia
- Phylum: Chordata
- Class: Reptilia
- Order: Squamata
- Suborder: Iguania
- Family: Agamidae
- Subfamily: Draconinae
- Genus: Hypsicalotes; Manthey & Denzer, 2000
- Species: H. kinabaluensis

Binomial name
- Hypsicalotes kinabaluensis (De Grijs, 1937)

Synonyms
- Calotes kinabaluensis (De Grijs, 1937); Bronchocela kinabaluensis (Malkmus, 1994)

= Hypsicalotes =

Genus of lizards

Hypsicalotes is a genus of the family Agamidae having a single species Hypsicalotes kinabaluensis found in Malaysia.

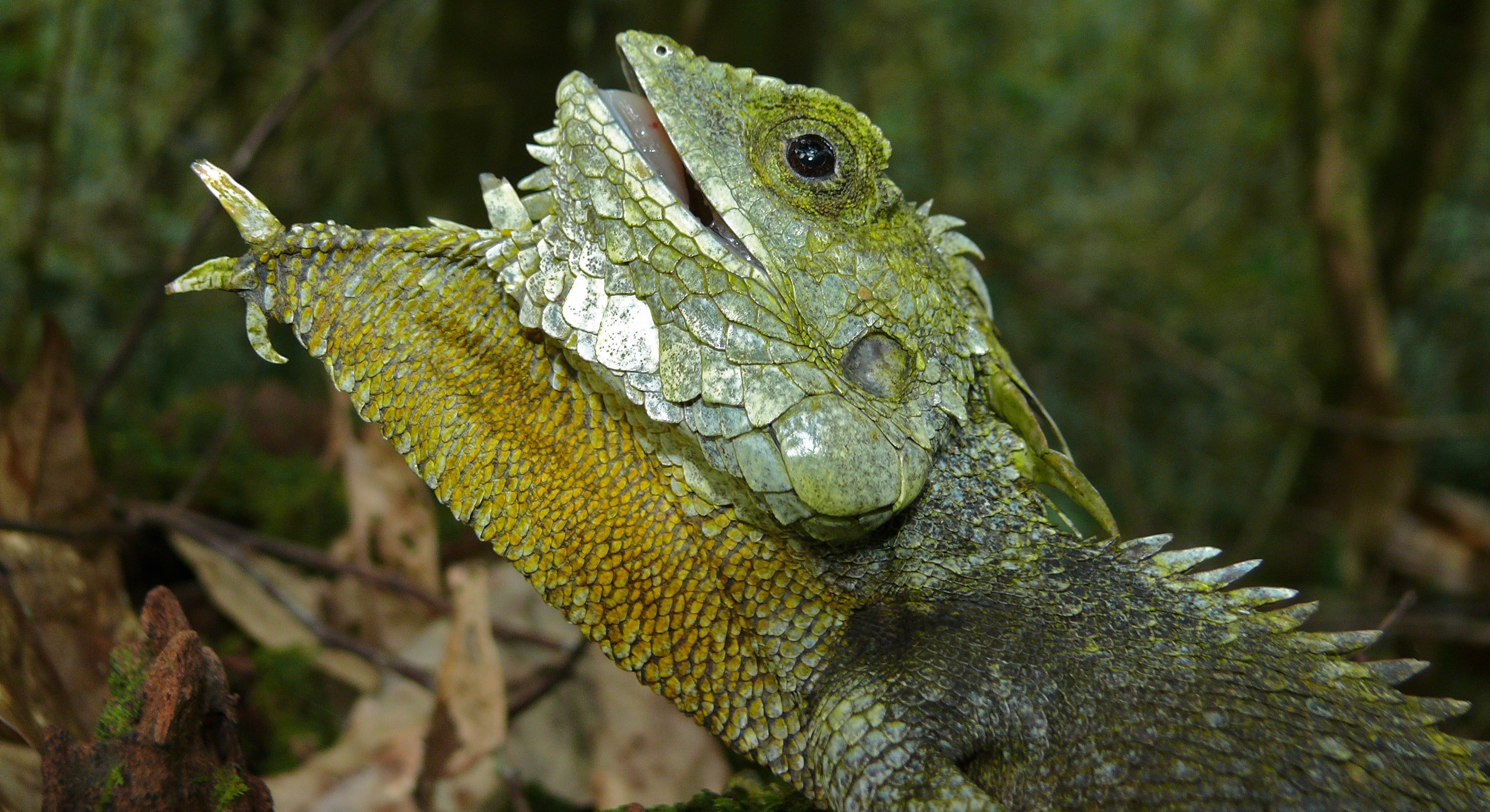
Displaying dewlap.
