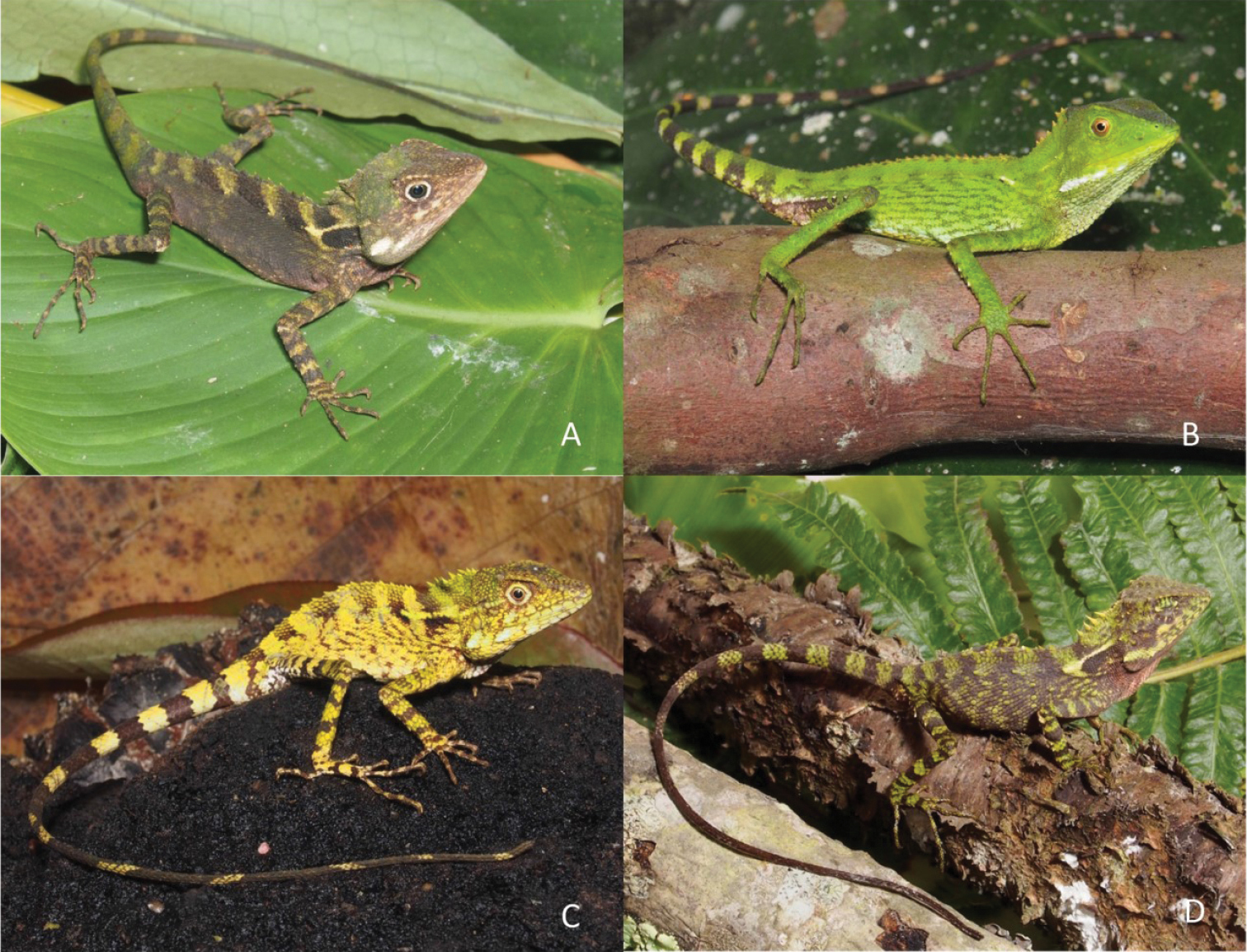
- Males of all four Dendragama species: A D. boulengeri, B D. australis, C D. dioidema, and D D. schneideri

Scientific classification
- Kingdom: Animalia
- Phylum: Chordata
- Order: Squamata
- Suborder: Iguania
- Family: Agamidae
- Subfamily: Draconinae
- Genus: Dendragama; Doria, 1888

Type species
- Calotes boulengeri Doria, 1888

Species
- 4 species (see text)

= Dendragama =

Genus of lizards

Dendragama is a genus of lizards in the family Agamidae. The genus is endemic to the Barisan Mountains of Sumatra in Indonesia and is found at altitudes above 1,500 m (4,900 ft). Populations of Dendragama were discovered at the northern and southern ends of Sumatra. High genetic distances and concordance of multiple, apparently independent diagnostic characters support the descriptions of these two populations as new species. These species undergo remarkable color change in response to time of day and stress.

== Species ==
There are four species that are recognized as being valid.

- Dendragama australis Harvey, Shaney, Sidik, Kurniawan & E.N. Smith, 2017
- Dendragama boulengeri (Doria, 1888) – Boulenger's tree agama
- Dendragama dioidema Harvey, Shaney, Sidik, Kurniawan & E.N. Smith, 2017
- Dendragama schneideri Ahl, 1926 – Schneider's tree agama
