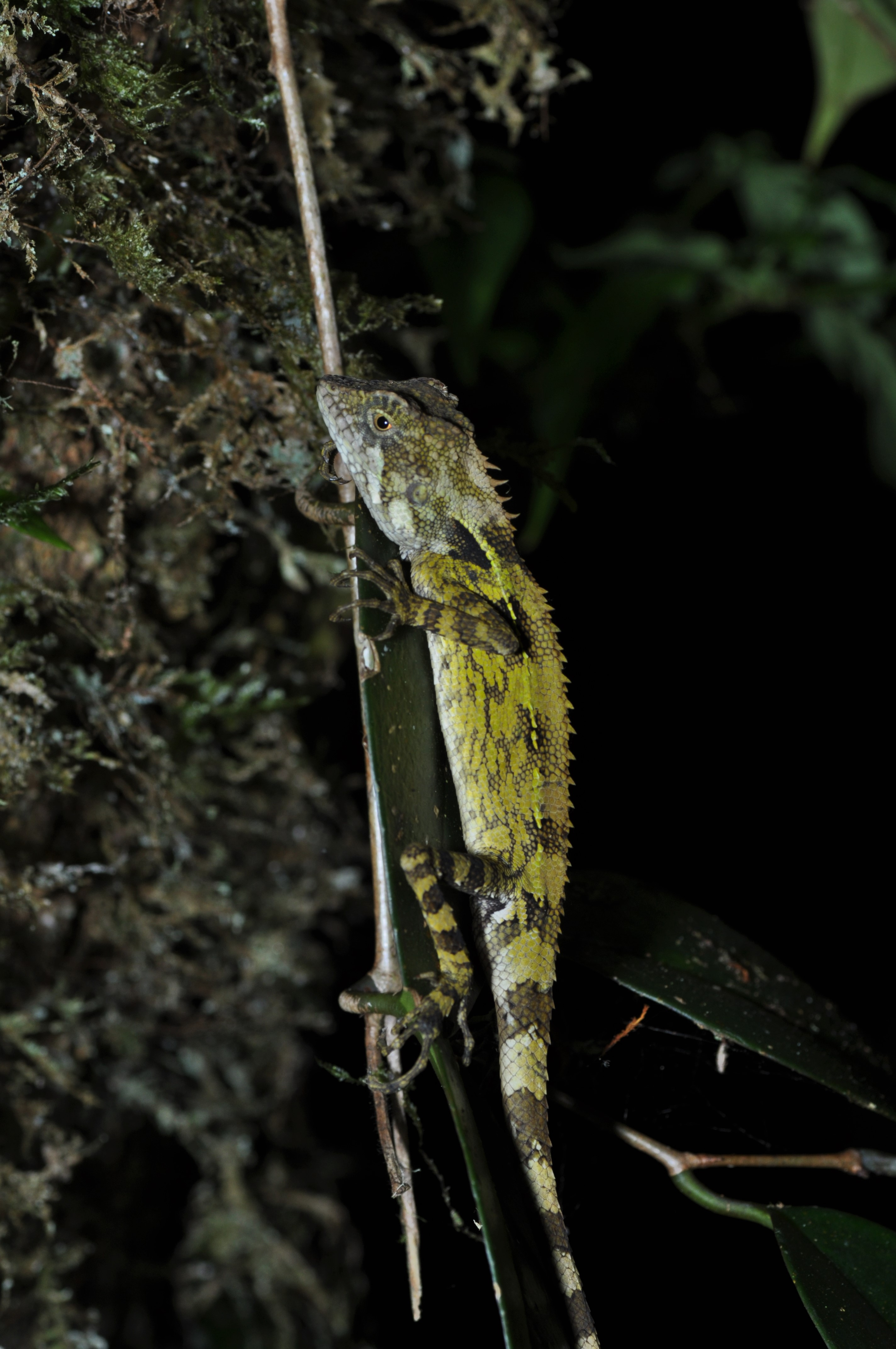

Conservation status
- Least Concern (IUCN 3.1)

Scientific classification
- Kingdom: Animalia
- Phylum: Chordata
- Class: Reptilia
- Order: Squamata
- Suborder: Iguania
- Family: Agamidae
- Genus: Dendragama
- Species: D. boulengeri

Binomial name
- Dendragama boulengeri Doria, 1888

Synonyms
- Dendragama boulengeri Doria, 1888; Calotes (Pseudocalotes) boulengeri — Mertens, 1954; Calotes boulengeri — Wermuth, 1967; Dendragama boulengeri — Manthey & Grossmann, 1997

= Boulenger's tree agama =

Species of lizard

Boulenger's tree agama (Dendragama boulengeri) is a species of lizard in the family Agamidae. The species is endemic to Sumatra.

== Etymology ==
Both the specific name, boulengeri, and the common name, Boulenger's tree agama, are in honor of Belgian-born British herpetologist George Albert Boulenger.

== Habitat ==
The preferred natural habitat of D. boulengeri is forest, at altitudes of 1,000–1,533 m (3,281–5,030 ft).

== Description ==
Dorsally, D. boulengeri is bluish green, with blackish crossbars. Ventrally it is pinkish, with brown spots. It may attain a snout-to-vent length (SVL) of 7.3 cm (2.9 in), with a tail length of 16 cm (6.3 in).

== Behavior ==
D. boulengeri is arboreal and diurnal.

== Reproduction ==
D. boulengeri is oviparous. Clutch size is two to four eggs, and the female lays more than one clutch per year.
