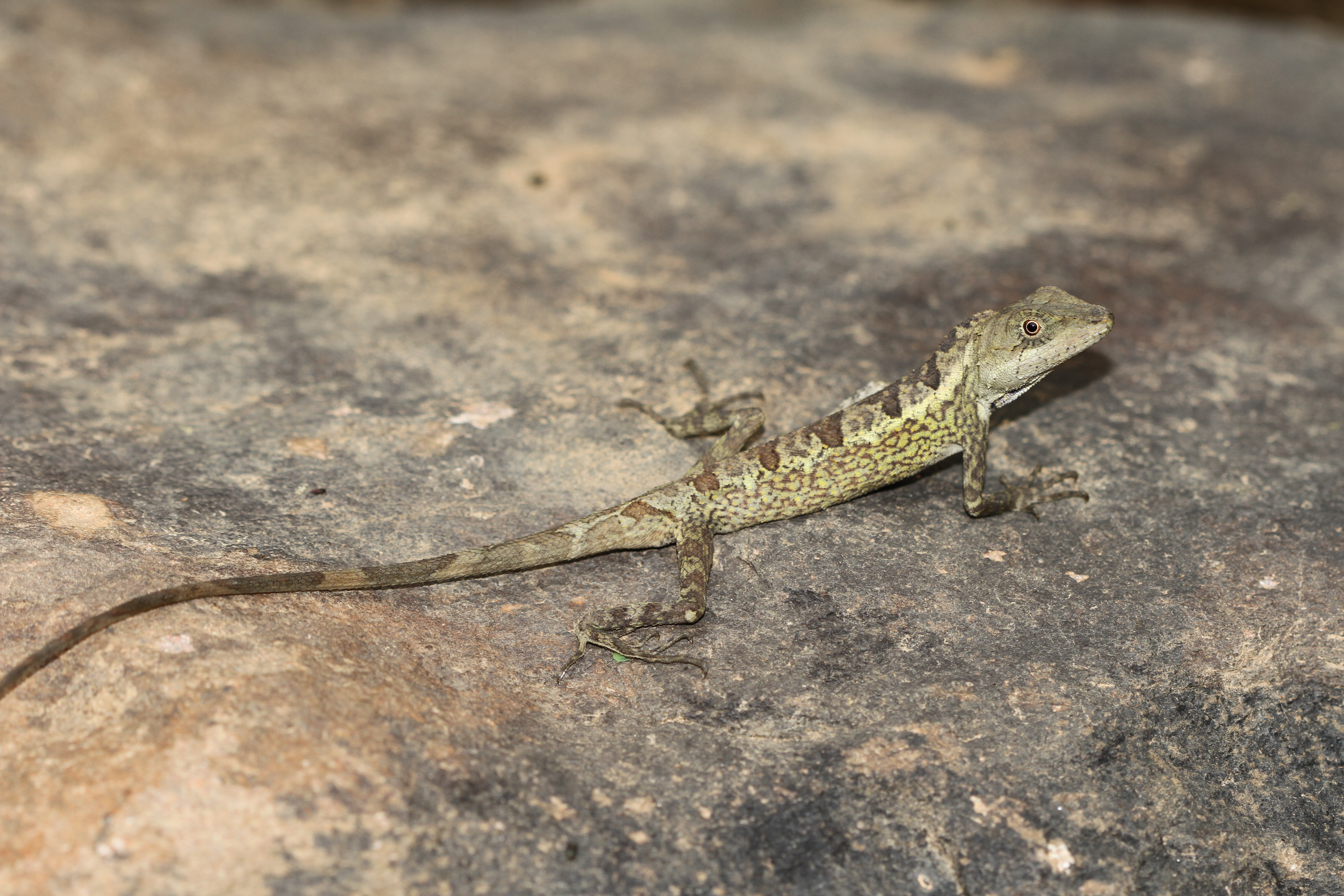

Scientific classification
- Kingdom: Animalia
- Phylum: Chordata
- Class: Reptilia
- Order: Squamata
- Suborder: Iguania
- Family: Agamidae
- Genus: Ptyctolaemus
- Species: P. gularis

Binomial name
- Ptyctolaemus gularis (Peters, 1864)

Synonyms
- Otocryptis (Ptyctolaemus) gularis Peters, 1864

= Ptyctolaemus gularis =

Species of lizard

The green fan-throated lizard (Ptyctolaemus gularis) is a species of agamid lizard found in Bangladesh, China (Tibet), India (Northeast- Arunachal Pradesh, Assam, Tripura, Khasi Hills, Mizoram) and Myanmar (Kachin, Chin), and possibly in Bhutan. The type locality, "Calcutta", is in error fide Zhao & Adler 1993; Ananjeva & Stuart (2001) give it as Margherita, in Patkai Mountains, Upper Assam.

Ptyctolaemus gularis is the type species of the genus Ptyctolaemus.
