= Pseudocophotis =

Scientific classification
- Kingdom: Animalia
- Phylum: Chordata
- Class: Reptilia
- Order: Squamata
- Suborder: Iguania
- Family: Agamidae
- Subfamily: Draconinae
- Genus: Pseudocophotis; Manthey, 1997

Genus of lizards

Pseudocophotis is a genus of agamid lizards from Southeast Asia.

== Species ==
There are two species in genus Pseudocophotis:

- Pseudocophotis kontumensis Ananjeva, Orlov, Truong, & Nazarov, 2007
- Pseudocophotis sumatrana (Hubrecht, 1879)
