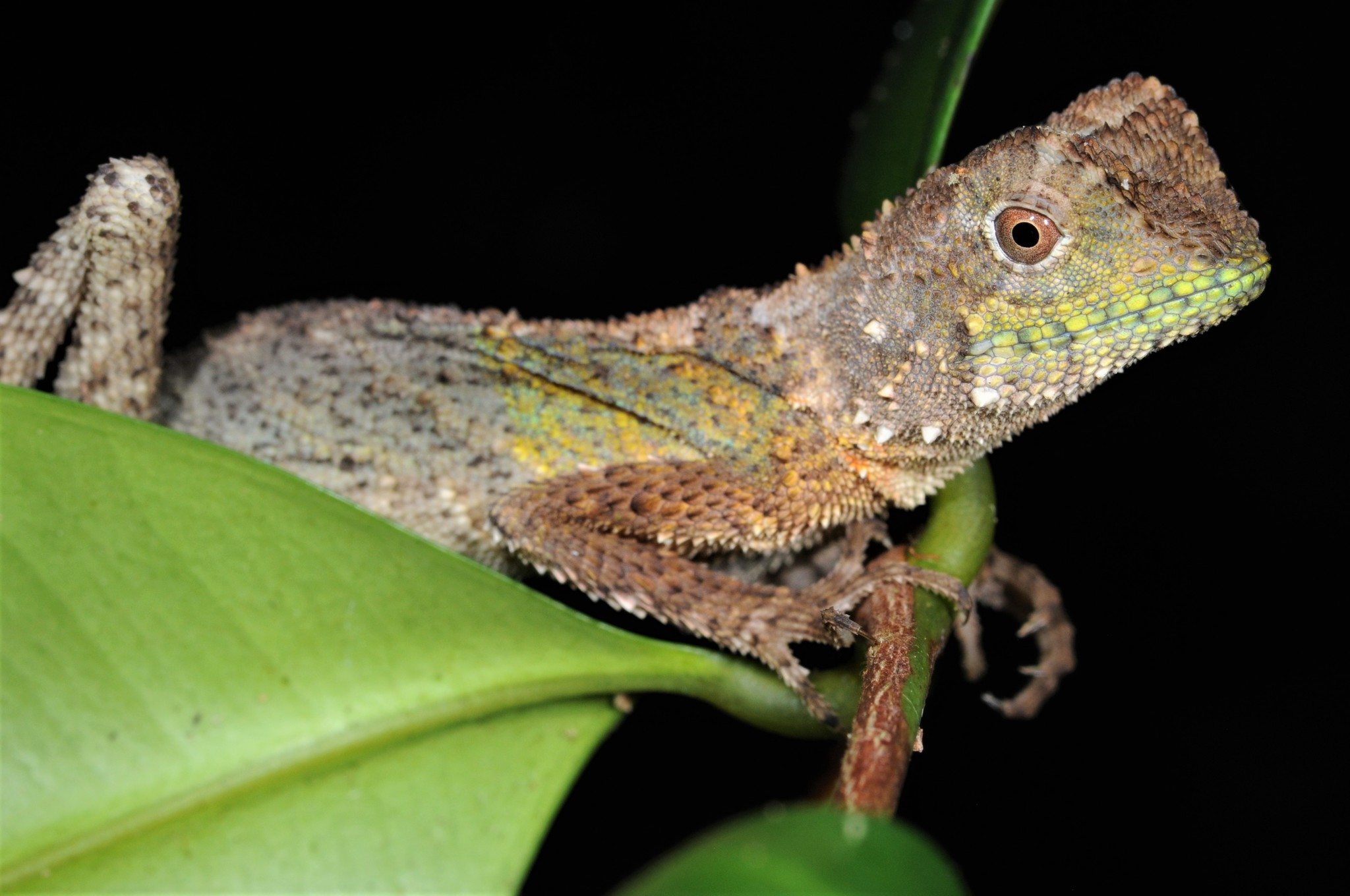

Conservation status
- Least Concern (IUCN 3.1)

Scientific classification
- Kingdom: Animalia
- Phylum: Chordata
- Class: Reptilia
- Order: Squamata
- Suborder: Iguania
- Family: Agamidae
- Genus: Pelturagonia
- Species: P. nigrilabris

Binomial name
- Pelturagonia nigrilabris (Peters, 1864)

= Pelturagonia nigrilabris =

Species of lizard

Pelturagonia nigrilabris, the blacklipped eyebrow lizard, is a species of agamid lizard. It is found in Indonesia and Malaysia.

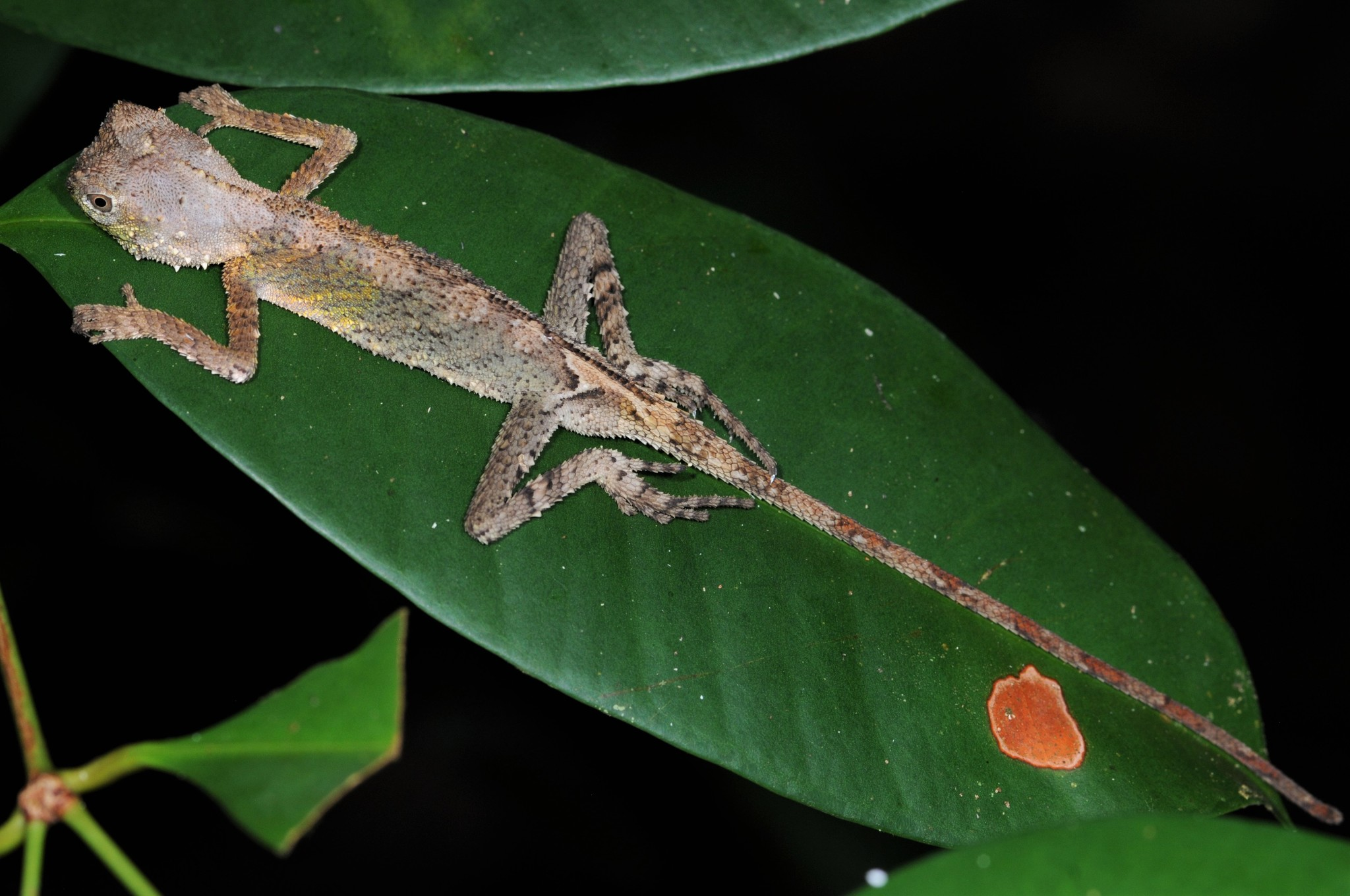
Kubah National Park, Borneo
