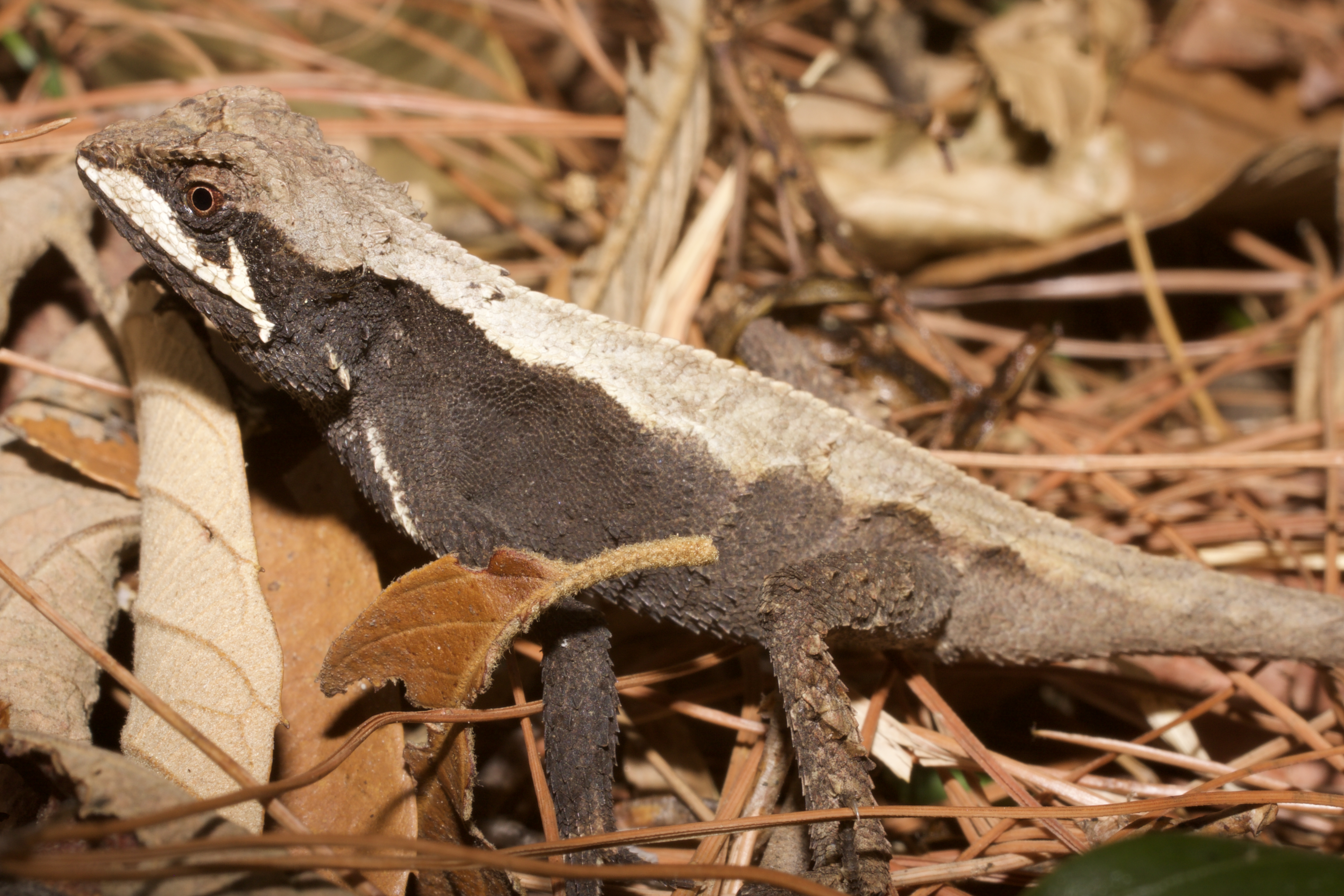
- Cristidorsa otai

Scientific classification
- Kingdom: Animalia
- Phylum: Chordata
- Class: Reptilia
- Order: Squamata
- Suborder: Iguania
- Family: Agamidae
- Subfamily: Draconinae
- Genus: Cristidorsa; Wang, Deepak, Datta-Roy, Lin, Jiang, Che & Siler, 2018

= Cristidorsa =

Genus of lizards

Cristidorsa is a genus of lizards in the subfamily Draconinae of the family Agamidae. Species of the genus are native to India and Myanmar. The name Cristidorsa is Latin for "ridged dorsum", in reference to the ridge on the back of lizards in this genus. The common name ridged dragons was suggested by the authors of the 2018 genus description. The genus contains two species, both of which were originally placed in the genus Japalura.

== Species ==
The genus Cristidorsa contains the following two species.

Image	Scientific name	Common name	Distribution
	Cristidorsa otai (Mahony, 2009)	Ota's mountain lizard	northeastern India
	Cristidorsa planidorsata (Jerdon, 1870)	smooth-scaled mountain lizard	Myanmar and northeastern India.

Nota bene: a binomial authority in parentheses indicates that the species was originally described in a genus other than Cristidorsa.
