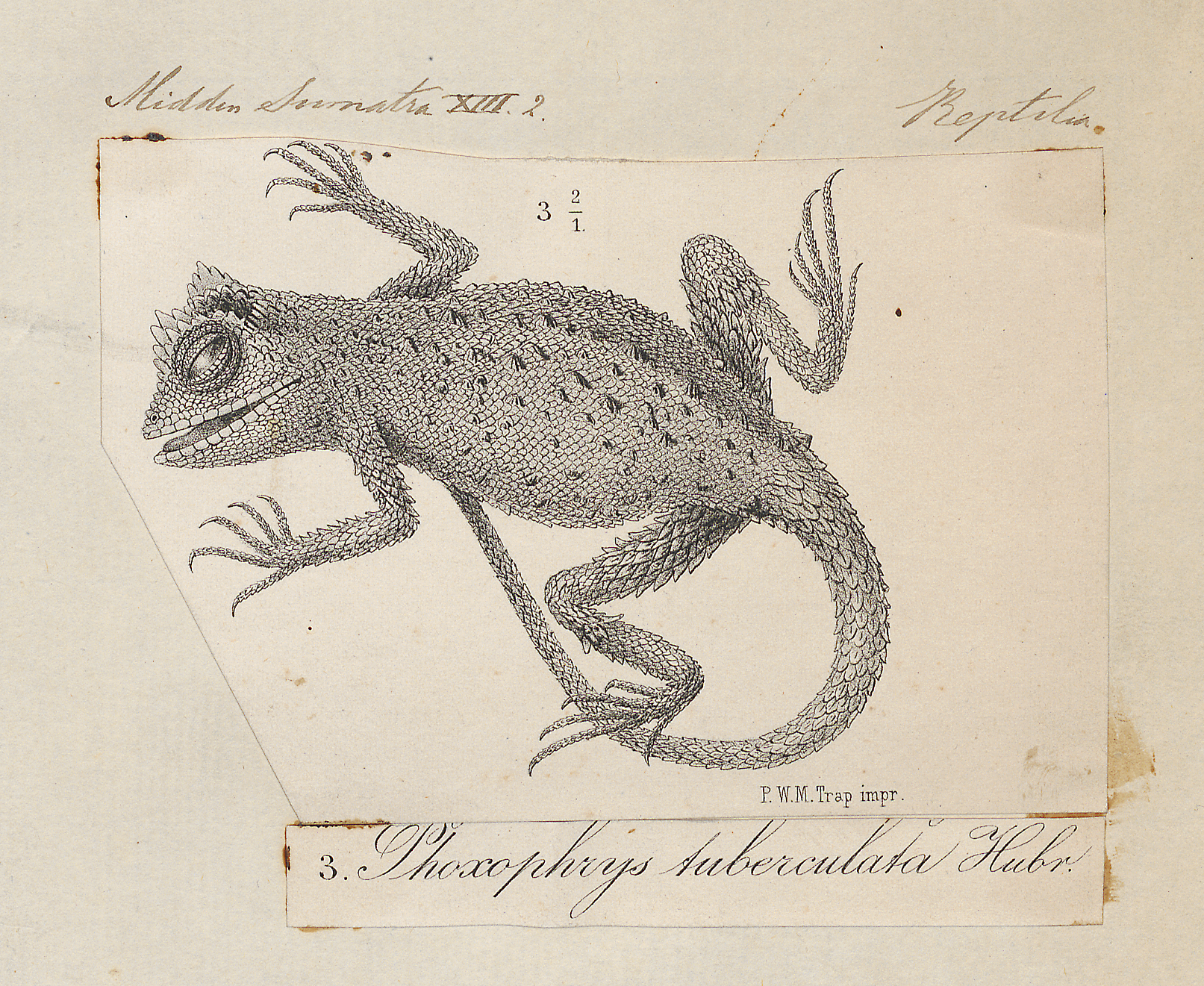

Scientific classification
- Domain: Eukaryota
- Kingdom: Animalia
- Phylum: Chordata
- Class: Reptilia
- Order: Squamata
- Suborder: Iguania
- Family: Agamidae
- Genus: Phoxophrys; Hubrecht, 1881
- Species: P. tuberculata

Binomial name
- Phoxophrys tuberculata Hubrecht, 1881

= Phoxophrys =

Genus of lizards

Hubrecht's eyebrow lizard (Phoxophrys tuberculata) is an agamid lizard from Indonesia. It is monotypic in the genus Phoxophrys, although all species in the genus Pelturagonia were previously located here.
