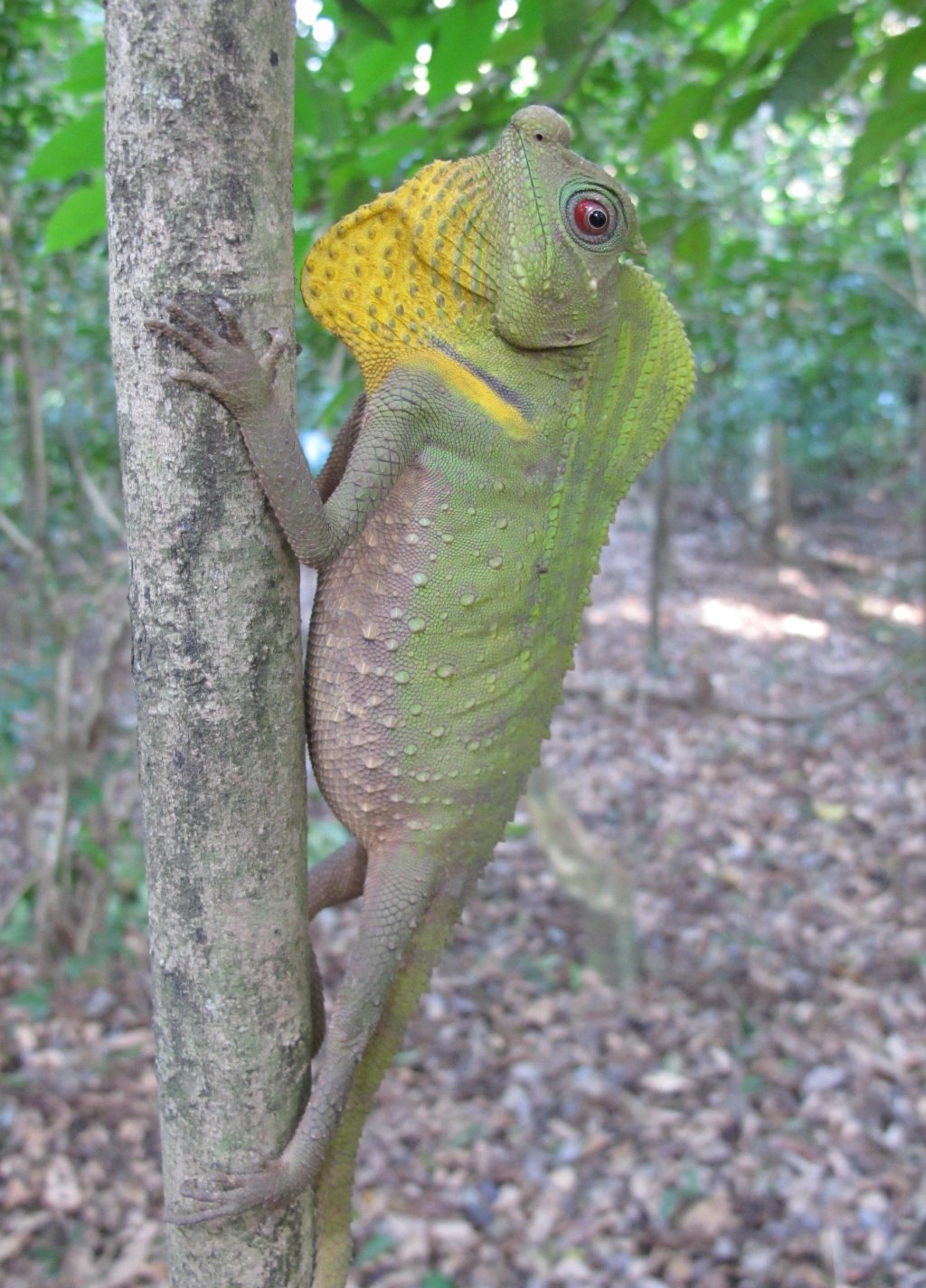

Conservation status
- Vulnerable (IUCN 3.1)
- CITES Appendix II

Scientific classification
- Kingdom: Animalia
- Phylum: Chordata
- Class: Reptilia
- Order: Squamata
- Suborder: Iguania
- Family: Agamidae
- Genus: Lyriocephalus; Merrem, 1820
- Species: L. scutatus

Binomial name
- Lyriocephalus scutatus (Linnaeus, 1758)
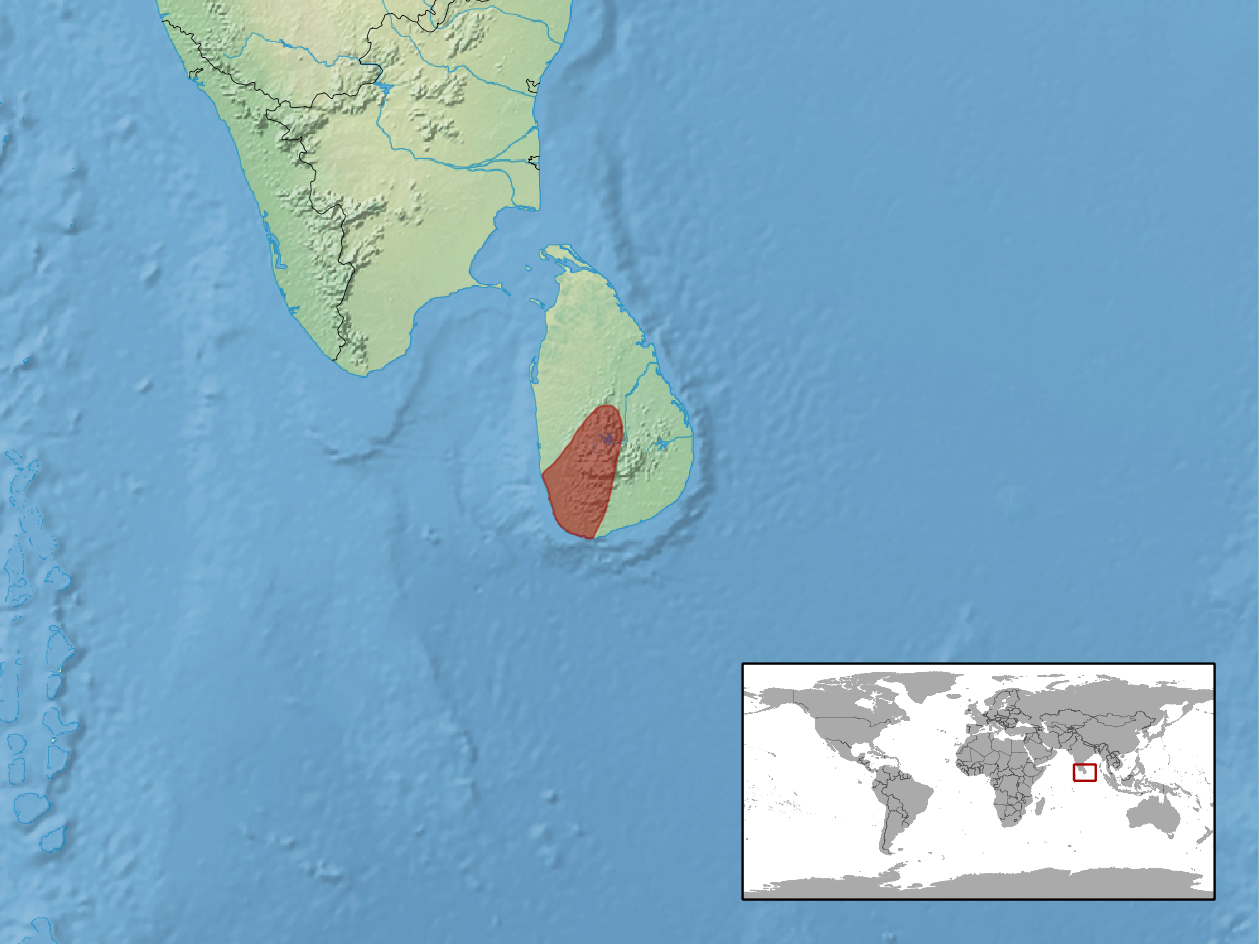

= Lyriocephalus =

Genus of lizards

Lyriocephalus is a genus of lizard within the agamid family, with the sole species Lyriocephalus scutatus. It is the largest agamid endemic to Sri Lanka and lives in dense wet zone forests. It is also called the hump-nosed lizard, hump snout lizard or the lyreshead lizard.

== Habitat and distribution ==
A large agamid lizard, widespread in the wet lowlands and the midhills of Sri Lanka, from 25m up to elevation of 1650m. It is easily sighted at the Pitadeniya area of the Sinharaja World Heritage Site.

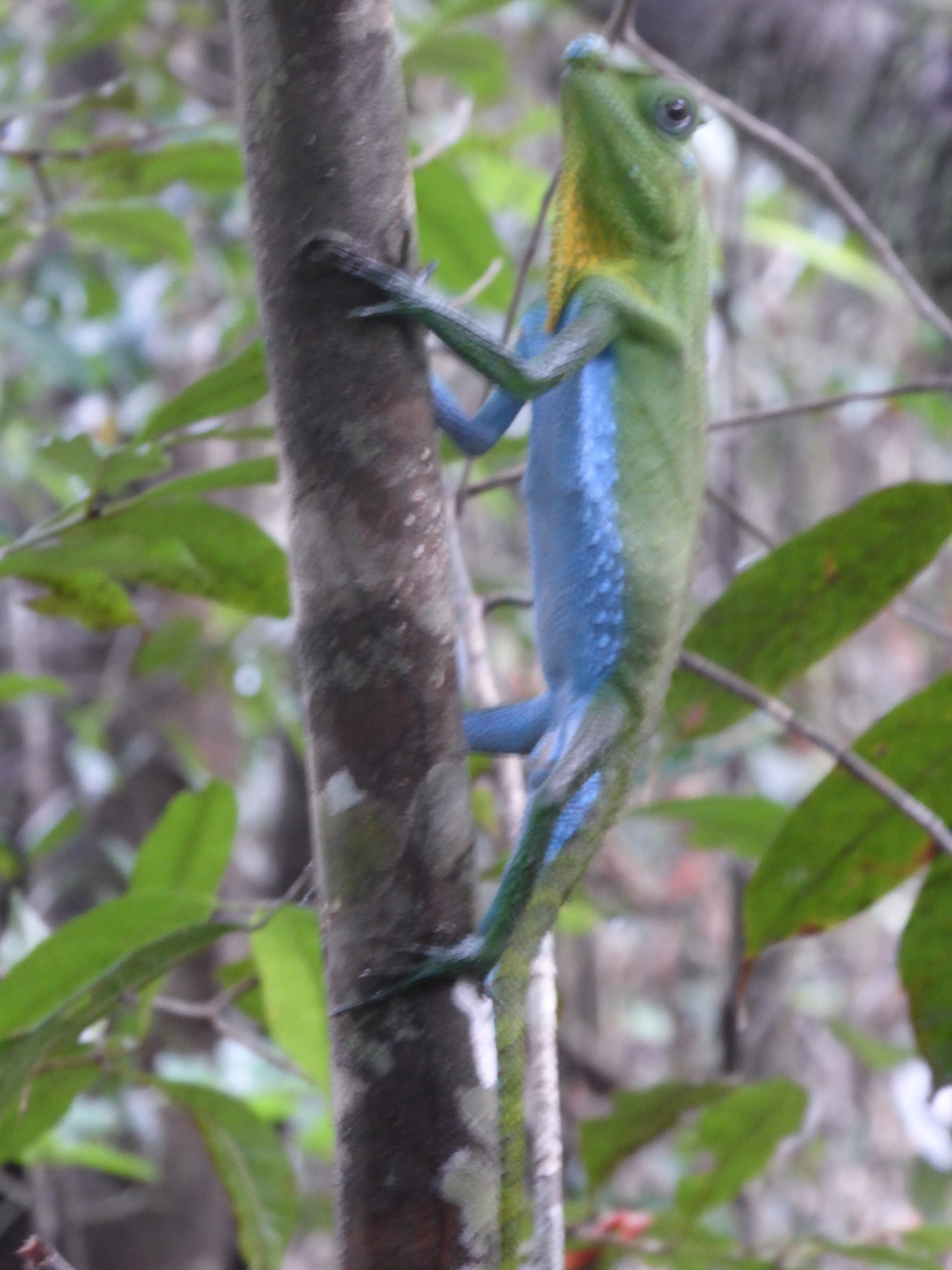
Note the blue belly.

== Description ==
Body is laterally compressed. Pair of small spines present at back of the head. Dorso-nuchal crest developed. Forehead scales keeled. A distinct bony arch or hump appears on the head of adults, giving it its name. Tympanum absent. A V-shaped gular sac present. Large, keeled gular scales can be seen. Tail is short and compressed with a blunt tip. Dorsum is light green, throat yellow. The rest of the venter is cream colored.

The males are bright green with a yellow throat pouch and neck sail. Although the females can also exhibit this colouration, normally they are brown, especially when a male is present. Juveniles are brown.

== Ecology and diet ==
Inhabits forests with high canopy and dense undergrowth, but it occasionally also enters home gardens. Active during the day, when it dwells low on trees as well as on the ground. It goes higher up on trees to sleep at night. The typical threat posture is open-mouth gape, revealing the bright red lining of the oral cavity. This species is also known to feign death when picked up. Its diet comprises essentially of earthworms and also arthropods, including termites, butterflies, and moths. It is also known to feed on young shoots and buds.

== Reproduction ==
About 1–11 eggs with measuring 12–13 * 20–22mm per clutch are produced in the months of January, March, May, June, September, October, and December. Eggs are buried after laid in the soil, sometimes under bushes. Incubation period lasts 35 days.

== Pictures ==
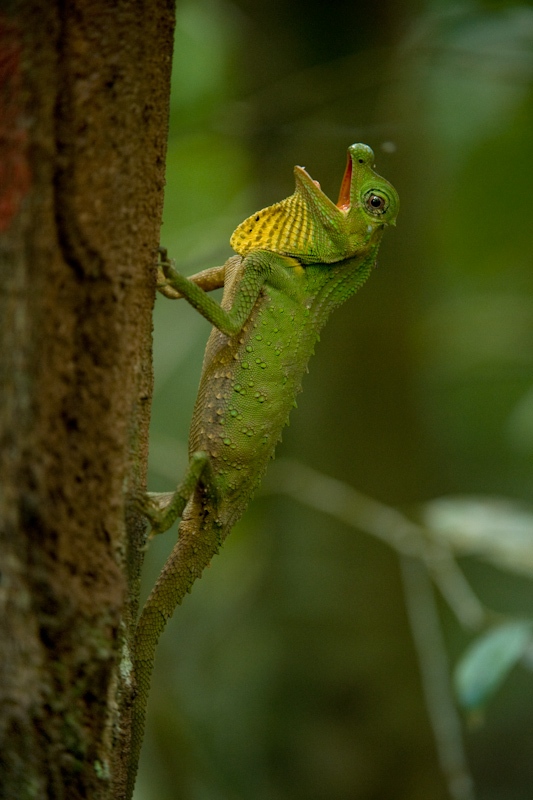

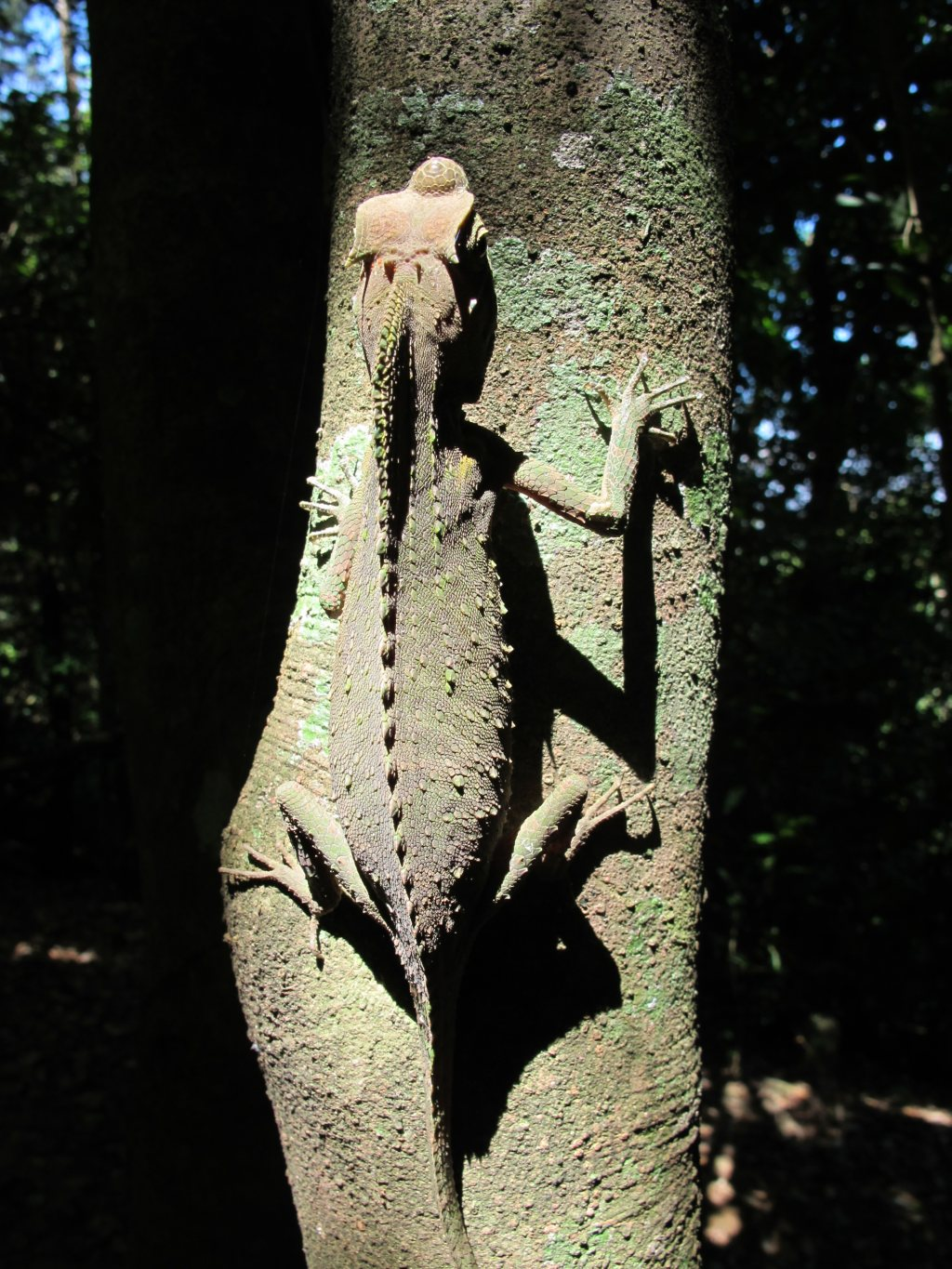

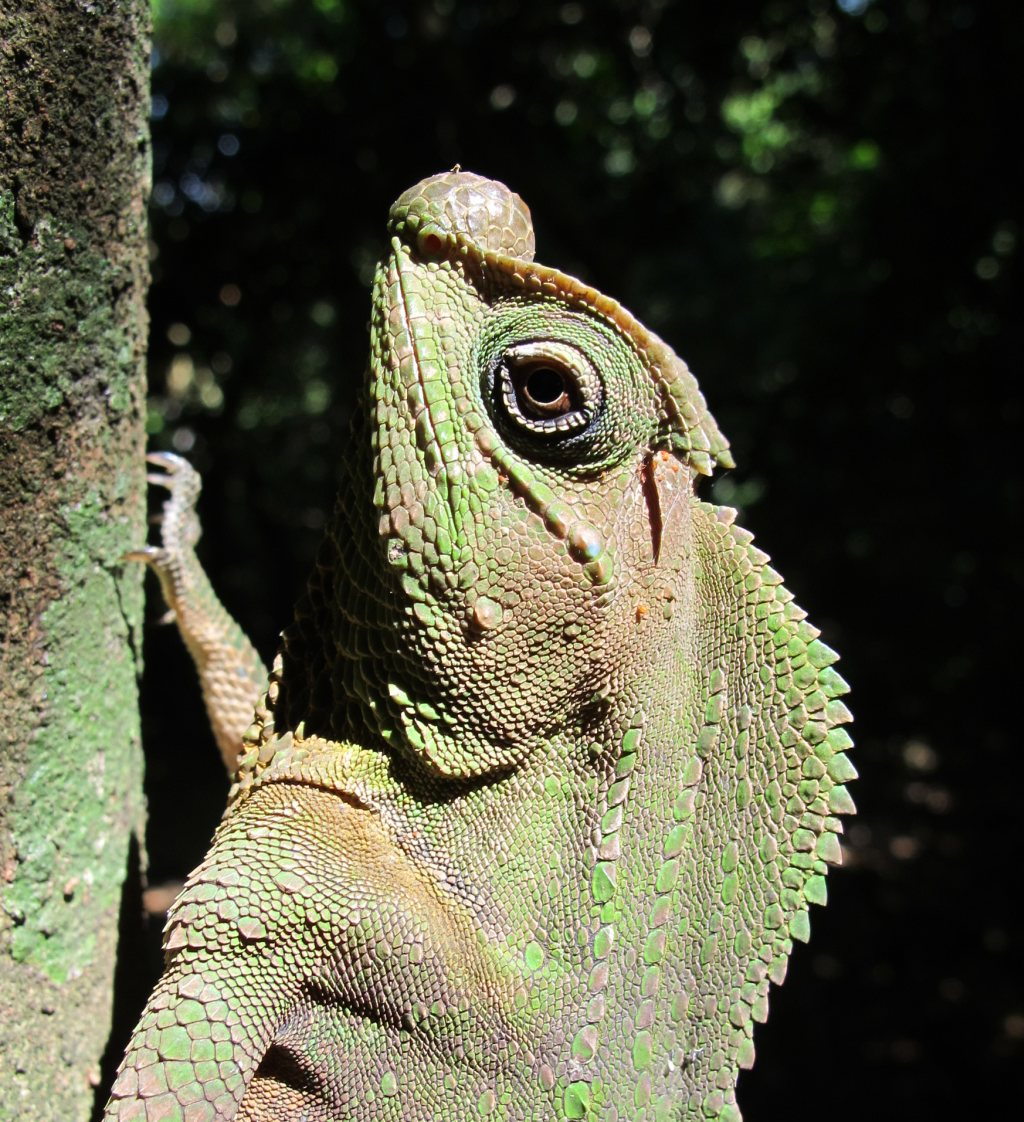
