= Blackthroated bloodsucker =

Conservation status
- Data Deficient (IUCN 3.1)

Scientific classification
- Kingdom: Animalia
- Phylum: Chordata
- Class: Reptilia
- Order: Squamata
- Suborder: Iguania
- Family: Agamidae
- Genus: Complicitus; Manthey & Grossmann, 1997
- Species: C. nigrigularis

Binomial name
- Complicitus nigrigularis (Ota & Hikida, 1991)

Synonyms
- Calotes nigrigularis; Bronchocela nigrigularis

Species of lizard

The blackthroated bloodsucker (Complicitus nigrigularis) is a species of lizard within the agamid family, the only species in the genus Complicitus.

It is found in Borneo.
