= Malayodracon =

Conservation status
- Near Threatened (IUCN 3.1)

Scientific classification
- Kingdom: Animalia
- Phylum: Chordata
- Class: Reptilia
- Order: Squamata
- Suborder: Iguania
- Family: Agamidae
- Genus: Malayodracon; Denzer, Manthey, Mahlow & Böhme, 2015
- Species: M. robinsonii

Binomial name
- Malayodracon robinsonii (Boulenger, 1908)

Synonyms
- Gonyocephalus robinsonii Boulenger, 1908; Gonocephalus robinsonii — Smedley, 1931; Goniocephalus robinsoni — M.A. Smith, 1935; Malayodracon robinsonii — Denzer et al., 2015

Genus of lizards

Malayodracon is a genus of lizard within the family Agamidae. The genus is monotypic, containing the sole species Malayodracon robinsonii. The species, also known commonly as Robinson's anglehead lizard and Robinson's forest dragon, is endemic to Southeast Asia. No subspecies are recognized as being valid.

== Etymology ==
The specific name, robinsonii, is in honor of British ornithologist Herbert Christopher Robinson.

== Geographic range ==
M. robinsonii is found in West Malaysia.

== Habitat ==
The preferred habitat of M. robinsonii is forest, at altitudes of 600–1,600 m (2,000–5,200 ft).

== Reproduction ==
M. robinsonii is oviparous.
