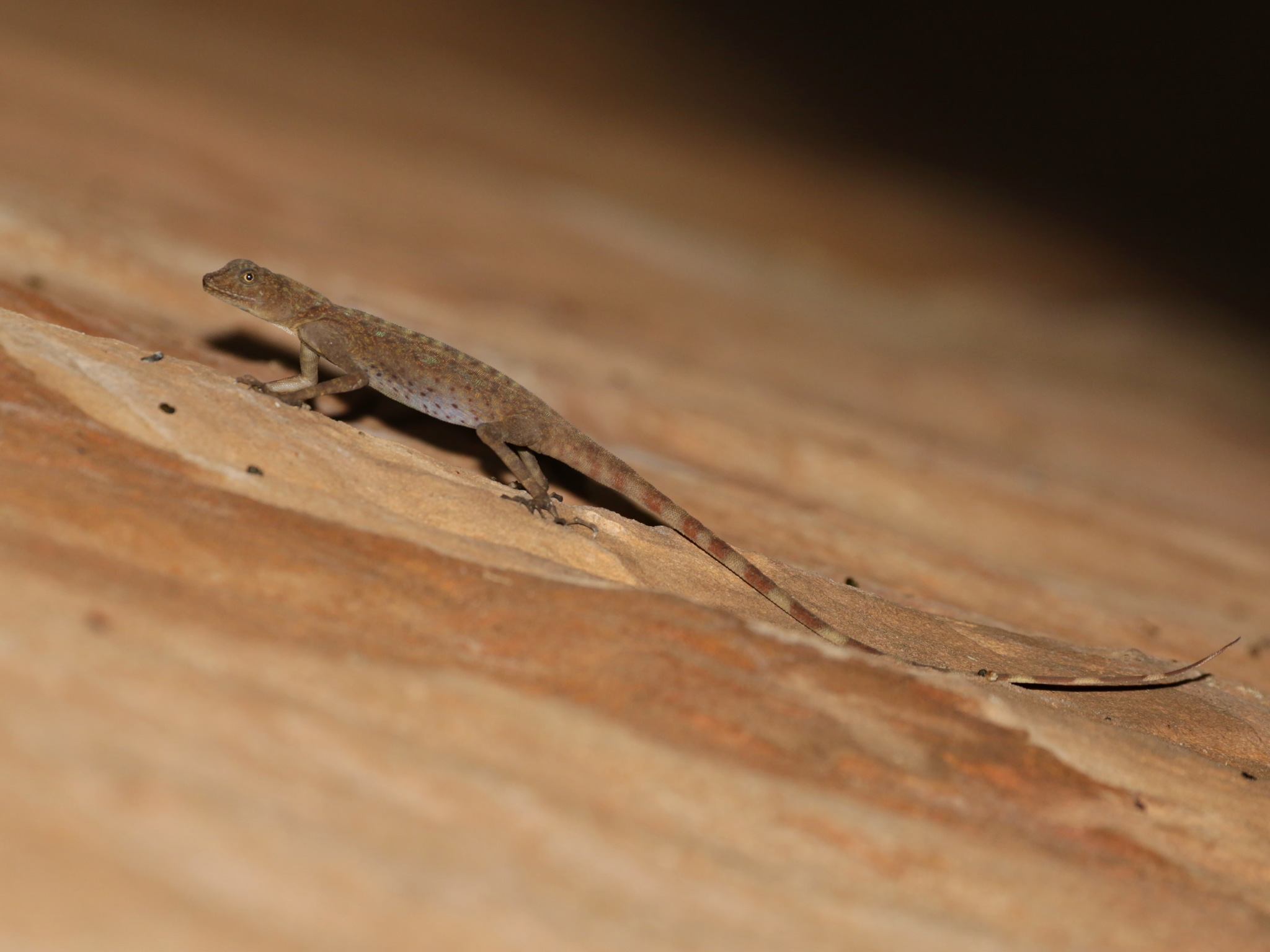

Conservation status
- Near Threatened (IUCN 3.1)

Scientific classification
- Kingdom: Animalia
- Phylum: Chordata
- Class: Reptilia
- Order: Squamata
- Suborder: Iguania
- Family: Agamidae
- Genus: Mantheyus; Ananjeva & Stuart, 2001
- Species: M. phuwuanensis

Binomial name
- Mantheyus phuwuanensis (Manthey & Nabhitabhata, 1991)

Synonyms
- Ptyctolaemus phuwuanensis Manthey & Nabhitabhata, 1991; Mantheyus phuwuanensis — Ananjeva & B. Stuart 2001

= Phuwua rock agama =

Species of lizard

The Phuwua rock agama (Mantheyus phuwuanensis) is a species of lizard within the family Agamidae. Mantheyus phuwuanensis is the only species in the genus Mantheyus. The species is native to Southeast Asia

== Etymology ==
The generic name, Mantheyus, is in honor of German herpetologist Ulrich Manthey (born 1946).

== Description ==
Mantheyus phuwuanensis has femoral pores and haired skin sense organs.

== Geographic range ==
Mantheyus phuwuanensis is found in west-central Laos and northeastern Thailand.

== Habitat ==
The preferred natural habitat of Mantheyus phuwuanensis is rocky areas of forest, at altitudes of 200–380 m (660–1,250 ft).

== Behavior ==
Mantheyus phuwuanensis is saxicolous (rock-dwelling) and both diurnal and nocturnal.

== Diet ==
Mantheyus phuwuanensis preys upon arachnids and insects.

== Reproduction ==
Mantheyus phuwuanensis is oviparous. Clutch size is usually three eggs, but may be as large as five eggs.
