= Agamidae =

Agamidae Temporal range: Cenomanian–recent
- Male, juvenile and female A. mwanzae Serengeti, Tanzania

Scientific classification
- Kingdom: Animalia
- Phylum: Chordata
- Class: Reptilia
- Order: Squamata
- Suborder: Iguania
- Infraorder: Acrodonta
- Family: Agamidae; Gray, 1827

Subfamilies
- 6, see text

Family of lizards

Agamidae is a family containing 582 species in 64 genera of iguanian lizards indigenous to Africa, Asia, Australia, and a few locations in Southern Europe. Many species are commonly called dragons or dragon lizards.

== Overview ==
Phylogenetically, they may be sister to the Iguanidae, and have similar appearances. Agamids usually have well-developed, strong legs. Their tails cannot be shed and regenerated like those of geckos (and several other families such as skinks), though a certain amount of regeneration is observed in some. Many agamid species are capable of limited change of their colours to regulate their body temperature. In some species, males are more brightly coloured than females, and colours play a part in signaling and reproductive behaviours. Although agamids generally inhabit warm environments, ranging from hot deserts to tropical rainforests, at least one species, the mountain dragon, is found in cooler regions. They are particularly diverse in Australia.

This group of lizards includes some more popularly known, such as the domesticated bearded dragon, Chinese water dragon, and Uromastyx species.

Members of the genus Draco have modified ribs that form a wing used to glide through their forest habitat.

Member of the agamid genus Draco engaging in gliding flight

One of the key distinguishing features of the agamids is their teeth, which are borne on the outer rim of their mouths (acrodonts), rather than on the inner side of their jaws (pleurodonts). This feature is shared with the chameleons and the tuatara, but is otherwise unusual among lizards. Agamid lizards are generally diurnal, with good vision, and include a number of arboreal species, in addition to ground and rock dwellers. Most need to bask in the sun to maintain elevated body temperatures (heliothermic). They generally feed on insects and other arthropods (such as spiders), although for some larger species, their diet may include small reptiles or mammals, nestling birds, and flowers or other vegetable matter.

== Reproduction ==
A great many agamid species are oviparous. The eggs are mostly found in damp soil or rotting logs to retain enough moisture during the incubation period. The clutch size varies from four to 10 eggs for most species, and incubation period lasts around 6–8 weeks. Specifically in the Leiolepidinae subfamily of agamids, all species use a burrowing system that reaches moist soil, where eggs are deposited in late spring/early summer or at the beginning of the dry season. The Leiolepidinae burrow system is also used for daily or seasonal retreats, as it allows them to regulate their body temperature or gain refuge from predators.

== Systematics and distribution ==
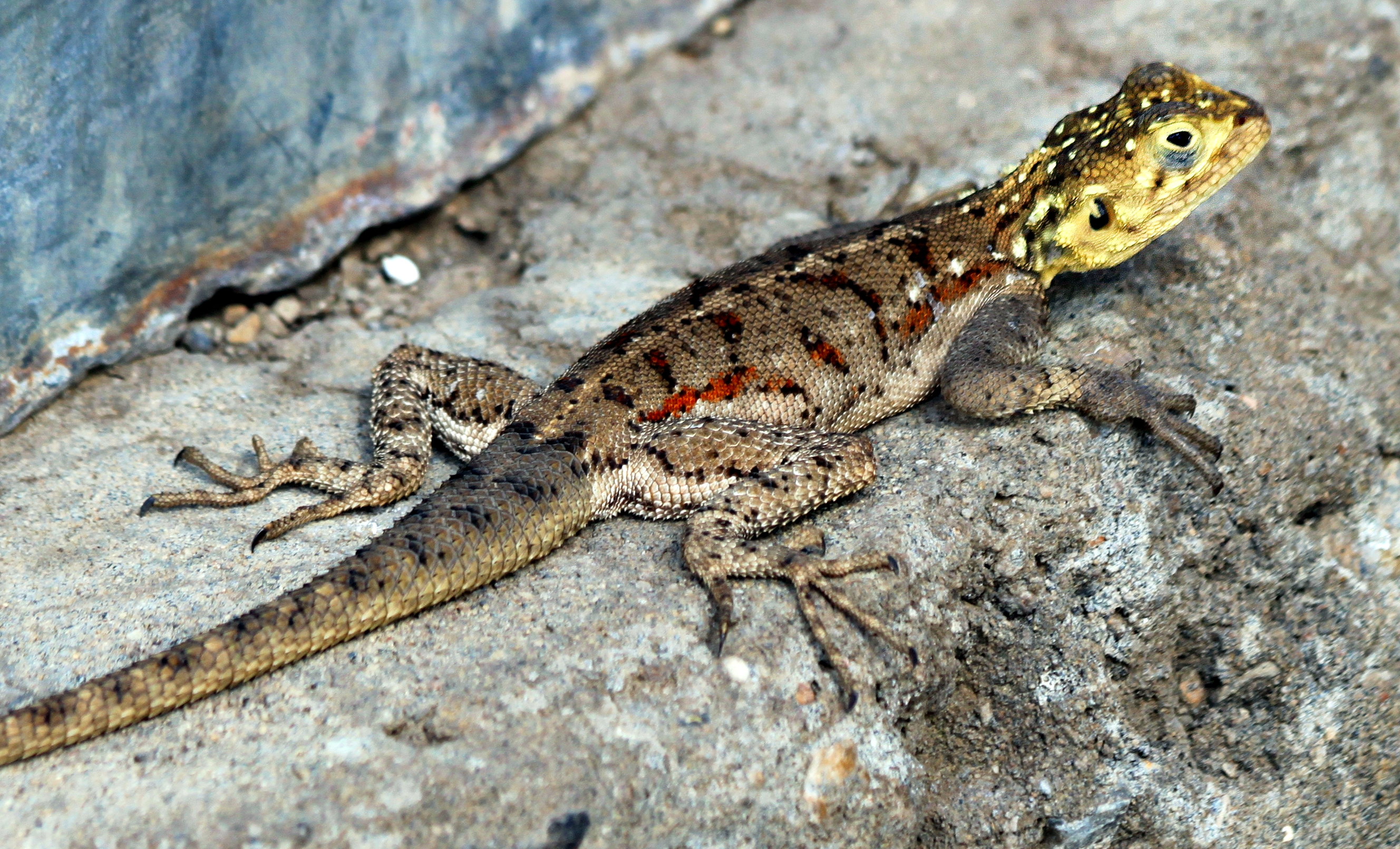
Ground agama (Agama aculeata) in Tanzania

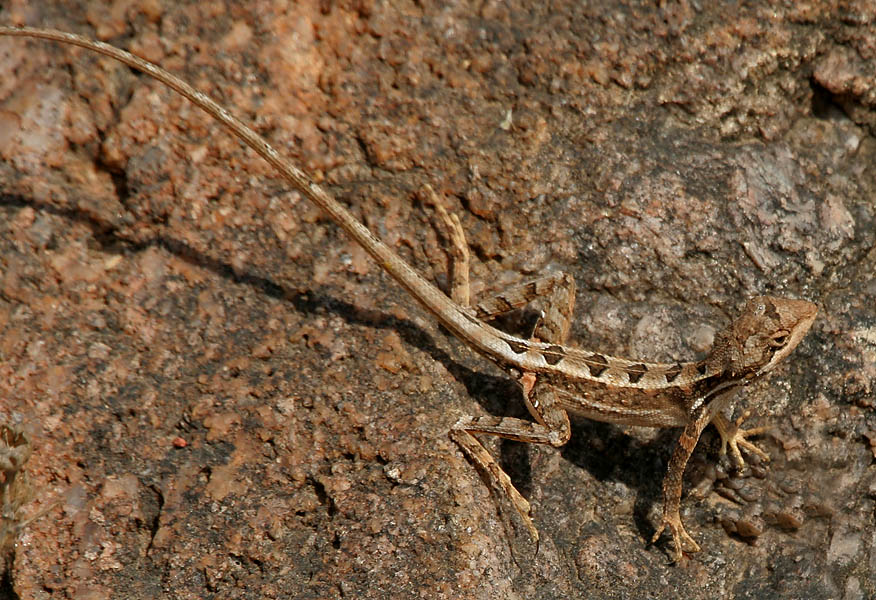
Pondichéry fan-throated lizard (Sitana ponticeriana) from the Agaminae

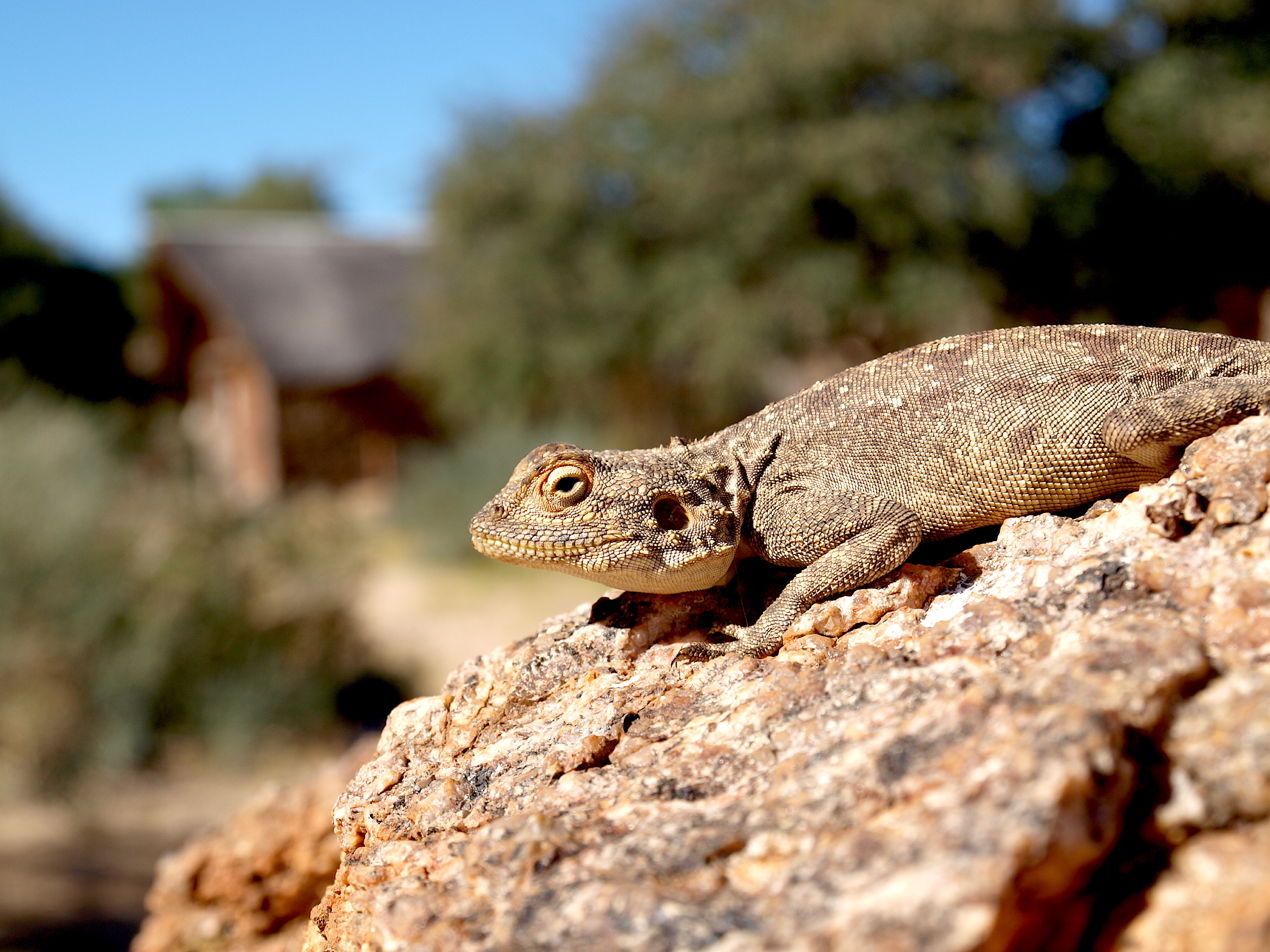
Agamidae in Namibia

Very few studies of the Agamidae have been conducted. The first comprehensive assessment was by Moody (1980), followed by a more inclusive assessment by Frost and Etheridge (1989). Subsequent studies were based on mitochondrial DNA loci by Macey et al. (2000) and Honda et al. (2000) and also by sampling across the Agamidae by Joger (1991). Few other studies focused on clades within the family, and the Agamidae have not been as well investigated as the Iguanidae.

The agamids show a curious distribution. They are found over much of the Old World, including continental Africa, Australia, southern Asia, and sparsely in warmer regions of Europe. They are absent from Madagascar and the New World. The distribution is the opposite of that of the iguanids, which are found in just these areas, but absent in areas where agamids are found. A similar faunal divide is found in between the boas and pythons.

=== Further classification ===
Among the Agamidae, six subfamilies were proposed by Macey et al. (2000) and are generally recognized:

- Agaminae (Africa, Europe, and South Asia)
- Amphibolurinae (Australia and New Guinea, one species in Southeast Asia)
- Draconinae (South and Southeast Asia)
- Hydrosaurinae (Hydrosaurus, Papua New Guinea, the Philippines, and Indonesia)
- Leiolepidinae (Leiolepis, Southeast Asia)
- Uromastycinae (Saara and Uromastyx, Africa and South Asia)

These can be further split into these 64 genera:

- Acanthocercus (15 species)
- Acanthosaura (20 species)
- Agama (47 species)
- Agasthyagama (2 species)
- Amphibolurus (4 species)
- Aphaniotis (3 species)
- Bronchocela (15 species)
- Bufoniceps (1 species)
- Calotes (29 species)
- Ceratophora (6 species)
- Chelosania (1 species)
- Chlamydosaurus (1 species)
- Complicitus (1 species)
- Cophotis (2 species)
- Coryphophylax (2 species)
- Cristidorsa (2 species)
- Cryptagama (1 species)
- Ctenophorus (38 species)
- Dendragama (4 species)
- Diploderma (47 species)
- Diporiphora (28 species)
- Draco (41 species)
- Gonocephalus (17 species)
- Gowidon (1 species)
- Harpesaurus (6 species)
- Hydrosaurus (5 species)
- Hypsicalotes (1 species)
- Hypsilurus (18 species)
- Intellagama (1 species)
- Japalura (8 species)
- Laodracon (1 species)
- Laudakia (13 species)
- Leiolepis (10 species)
- Lophocalotes (2 species)
- Lophognathus (2 species)
- Lophosaurus (3 species)
- Lyriocephalus (1 species)
- Malayodracon (1 species)
- Mantheyus (1 species)
- Microauris (1 species)
- Moloch (1 species)
- Monilesaurus (4 species)
- Otocryptis (2 species)
- Paralaudakia (8 species)
- Pelturagonia (5 species)
- Phoxophrys (1 species)
- Phrynocephalus (36 species)
- Physignathus (1 species)
- Pogona (6 species)
- Psammophilus (2 species)
- Pseudocalotes (23 species)
- Pseudocophotis (2 species)
- Pseudotrapelus (6 species)
- Ptyctolaemus (3 species)
- Rankinia (1 species)
- Saara (3 species)
- Salea (2 species)
- Sarada (3 species)
- Sitana (15 species)
- Trapelus (13 species)
- Tropicagama (1 species)
- Tympanocryptis (23 species)
- Uromastyx (15 species)
- Xenagama (4 species)

== Evolutionary history ==
The oldest known unambiguous agamid is Protodraco from the mid-Cretaceous (early Cenomanian) aged Burmese amber of Myanmar, dating to around 99 million years ago. It is similar to primitive, extant Southeast Asian agamids. Gueragama from the Late Cretaceous of Brazil may also be an agamid. Jeddaherdan, a supposed agamid from the Late Cretaceous of Morocco, was later shown to be actually a young subfossil of the living genus Uromastyx.

== Predator responses ==
Body temperature helps determine the physiological state of agamids and affects their predator responses. A positive correlation is seen between a flight response (running speed) and body temperature of various agamid species. At higher body temperatures, these lizards tend to flee quickly from predators, whereas at lower temperatures, they tend to have a reduced running speed and show an increased fight response, where they are more likely to be aggressive and attack predators.

Certain physical features of some lizards of these species, such as frilled-neck lizards, play a role in their defensive responses, as well. During the mating season, males tend to display more of their frill, and give fight responses more often. Both males and females display their frills when they are threatened by predators and during social interactions.
