= Luzon rain forests =

Ecoregion in Luzon, the Philippines

Luzon rain forest
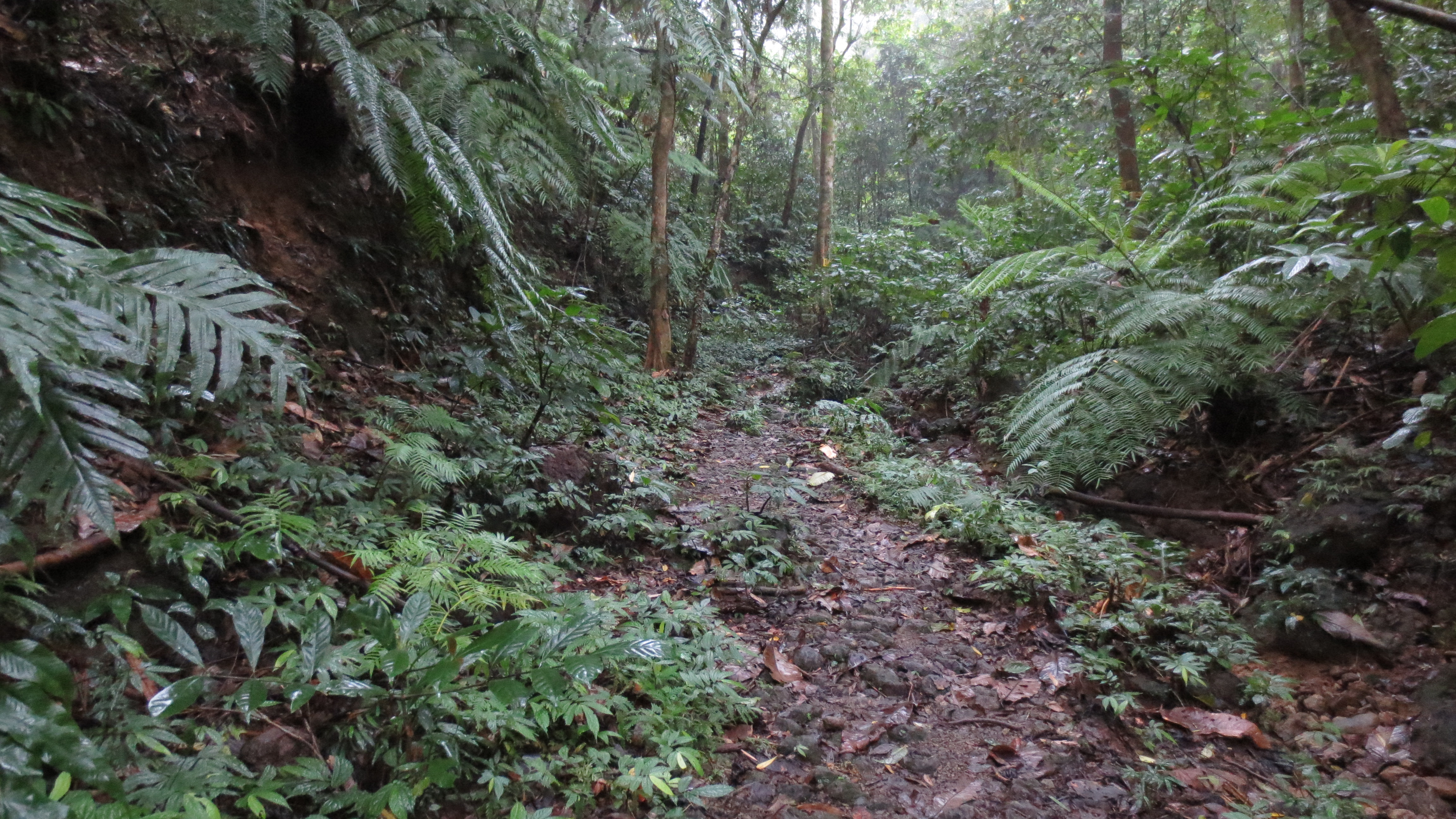
- Rainforest in Mount Makiling

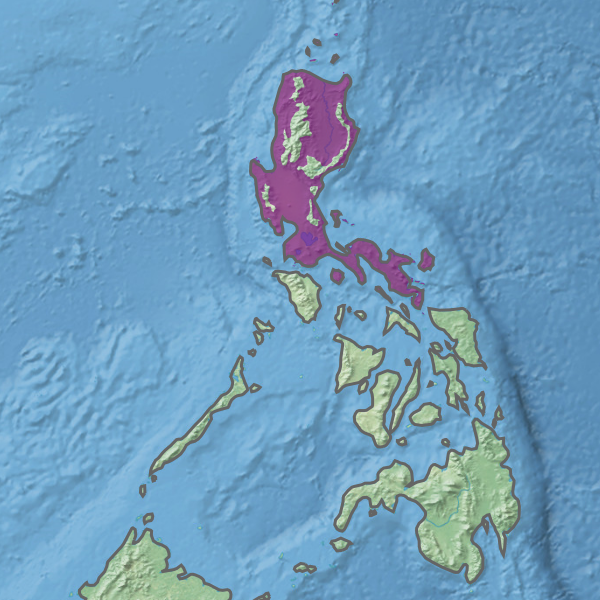
- Ecoregion territory (in purple)

Ecology
- Realm: Indomalayan
- Biome: tropical and subtropical moist broadleaf forests
- Borders: Luzon montane rain forests; Luzon tropical pine forests

Geography
- Area: 93,358 km^{2} (36,046 sq mi)
- Country: Philippines

Conservation
- Conservation status: Critical/Endangered
- Protected: 9,994 km^{2} (11%)

The Luzon rain forest is a tropical moist broadleaf forest ecoregion on the island of Luzon. Luzon is the largest island in the Philippines, and the Luzon rain forest is the most extensive rainforest ecoregion in the country. The ecoregion includes the lowlands of Luzon and neighboring islands below 1000 meters elevation. Very little of the original rainforest remains, and the status of this area is critical/endangered.

== Geography ==
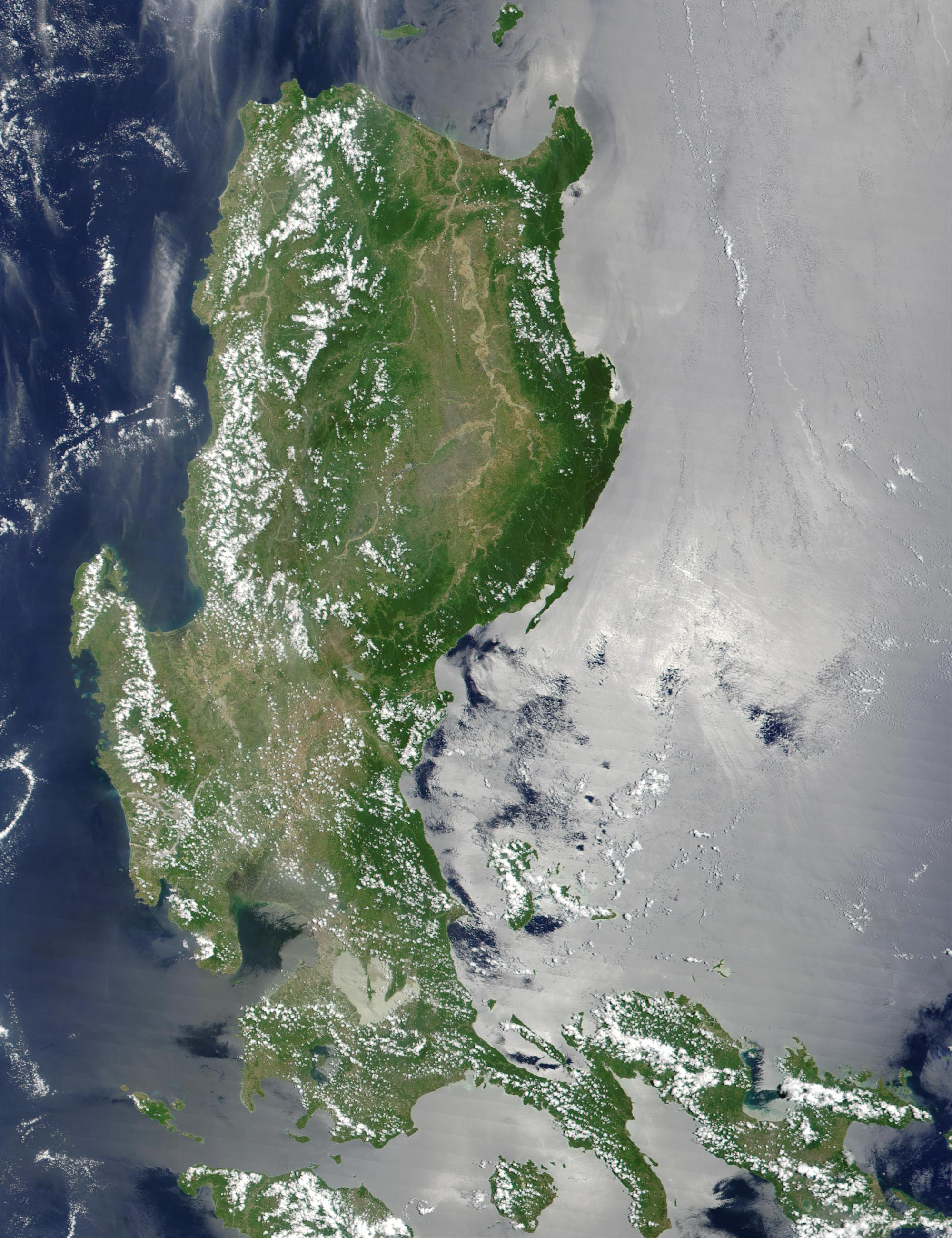
Satellite view of the island Luzon

The Luzon rain forests encompass about 95,571 square kilometers (36,900 sq mi) out of the 109,965 sq kilometers (42,458 sq mi) of the total area of the island of Luzon. Luzon is the largest and northernmost major island of the Philippines, located in the western Pacific Ocean. The Batanes and Babuyan Islands to the north, Catanduanes and Polillo Islands to the east, and Marinduque to the southwest are considered a part of the Luzon rain forests ecoregion.

The Luzon montane rain forests ecoregion covers areas of the Sierra Madre, Zambales Mountains, and northern Cordillera Central above 1000 meters elevation. The Luzon tropical pine forests cover the central Cordillera Central above 1000 meters elevation.

=== Geologic history ===
Luzon has never been connected to mainland Asia. At least 15 million years ago, friction between the Australian and Asian tectonic plates and volcanic activity created parts of the Luzon highlands, which over the next 10 million years morphed into their modern form. This long period of isolation and complex internal geography is a primary cause for the great biodiversity and high degree of endemism found on the island of Luzon.

During the Ice ages, sea levels were up to 120 meters lower than at present. Ice-age Greater Luzon connected Luzon with Catanduanes, Marinduque, the Polillo Islands, and several smaller neighboring islands. The ice-age land bridges allowed the animals and plants of these now-separate islands to mix, which made them part of the same ecoregion.

== History ==
=== Prehistoric ===
In 2005, evidence for human occupation in northern Luzon since at least 25,000 years ago, was found in Callao Cave. Evidence included chert flake tools, charred parenchymatous tissues, starch grains, grasses, and Moraceae phytolith. The possibility of hunter-gatherers subsisting in Holocene tropical rain forests without support from agriculturalists was debated, based on the patchy and seasonal resources. Wild forest animals are lean and lacking in calorie-rich fat.

However, hunters and gatherers may have managed by strategizing and moving to correspond to the shifting food resources. Information on skeletal morphology and diet is merely speculative as no human remains were recovered from this period. This idea is supported by the Sierra Madre Agta of the recent ethnographic past who would plan their movements based on the seasons and available resources; they hunted in the montane forest during the rainy season and in the lowland forest during the summer. Most of their food supply came from fishing, shellfish gathering, wild yams, nuts, and Caryota palms.

In the same cave two years later, in 2007, the same scientist found a metatarsal bone dated to at least around 67,000 years ago, which is speculated to possibly be of Homo sapiens origin. The bone (Right MT3 – the small bone from the end of the middle toe of the right foot) has been identified as belonging to a species of the genus Homo. To tell if the bone belongs to an ancient anatomically modern human, a skull or mandible from the specimen is needed. This fossilized remaining from Callao Cave is referred to as Callao Man.

=== World War II ===
During World War II, the Japanese invaded the Philippines, and a small band of the Communist Party of the Philippines (CPP) activists used the dense mountain jungles and vast swamps of the Luzon rainforest for protection. The communist activists established a base of operations in the nearby Mt. Arayat and the Candaba Swamp. These activists launched small yet annoying attacks against the Japanese. On December 10, 1941, CPP leaders issued a manifesto vowing their support for the anti-Japanese efforts of the Commonwealth and the United States, and urging the peasants to support this united anti-Japanese front. Resulting was the organization of the Hukbalahap, an acronym for the Hukbong Bayan Laban sa Hapon (the Anti-Japanese Army), in a small lowland forest clearing near Mt. Arayat on March 29, 1942, by the merging of the CPP with the remaining socialist and peasant organizations of Luzon.

== Flora ==
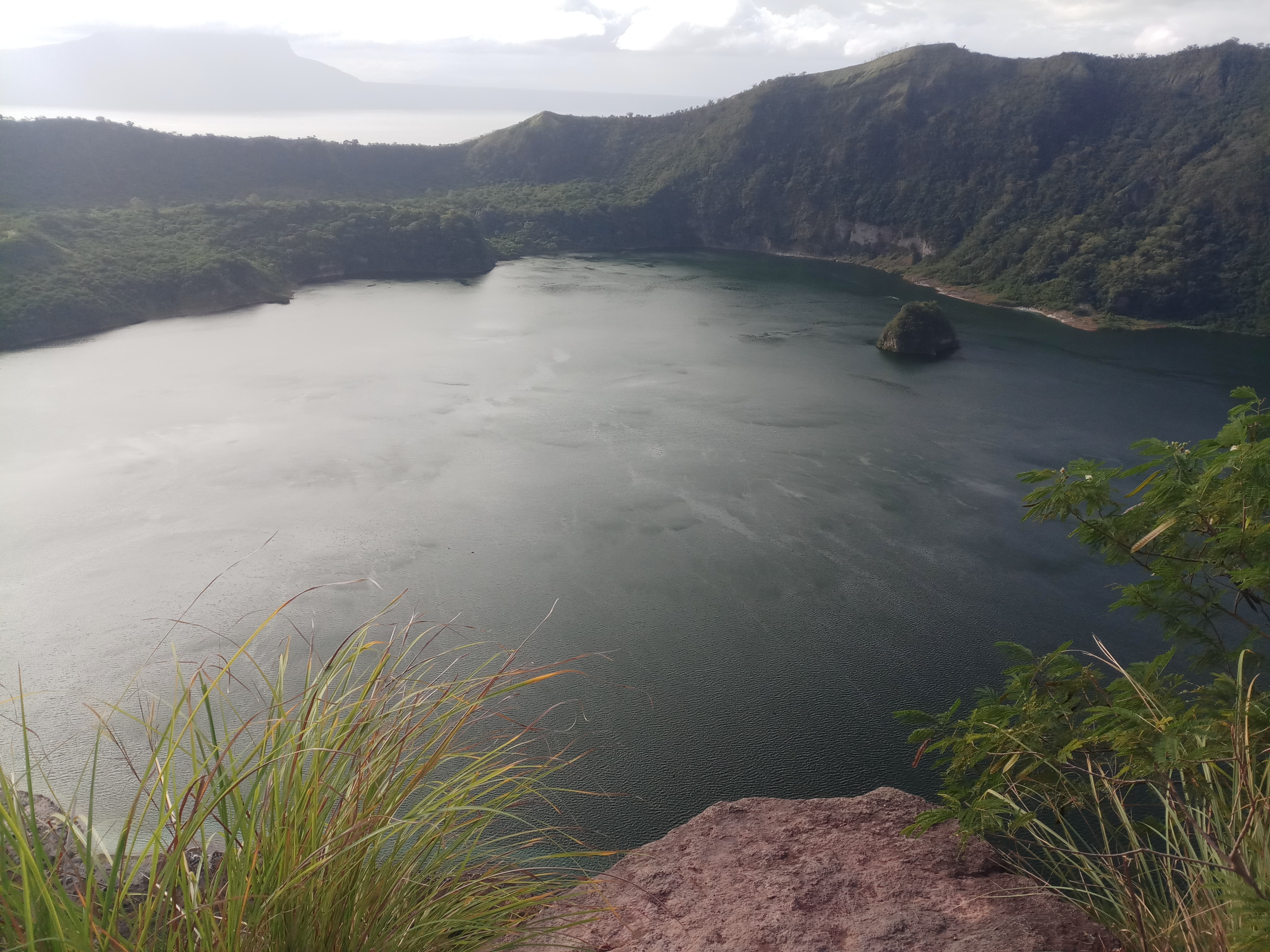
Rain forests on Taal Volcano

The rainforest of the lowlands encompass all areas below 1,000 metres (3,300 ft) in elevation. Much of the lowland rainforest has been destroyed by human deforestation activities.

Dipterocarp trees with wide buttresses dominate this area. These trees are massive, growing up to 60 metres (200 ft) tall with diameters between 1–2 metres (3.3–6.6 ft). Vatica pachyphylla is a critically endangered tree species endemic to the ecoregion.

The mature lowland forests tend to have an uneven canopy height. Rattans and lianas grow in the understory, receiving the light they need to thrive through areas of disturbance. There is generally a large amount of herbaceous undergrowth, with epiphytic ferns and orchids growing on the thick branches of tall trees.

=== Montane forests ===
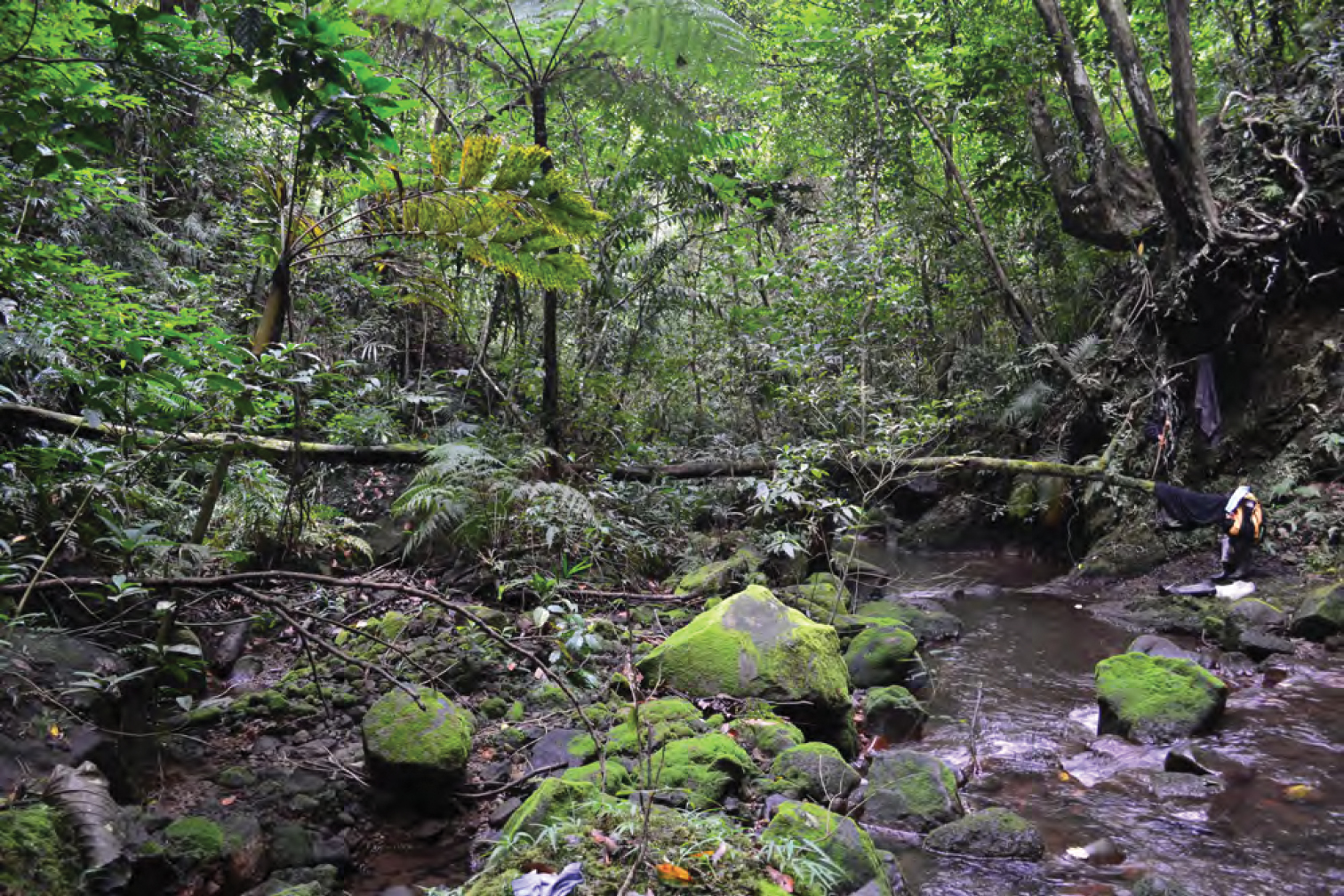
Mature forest in the crater floor of Mount Cagua

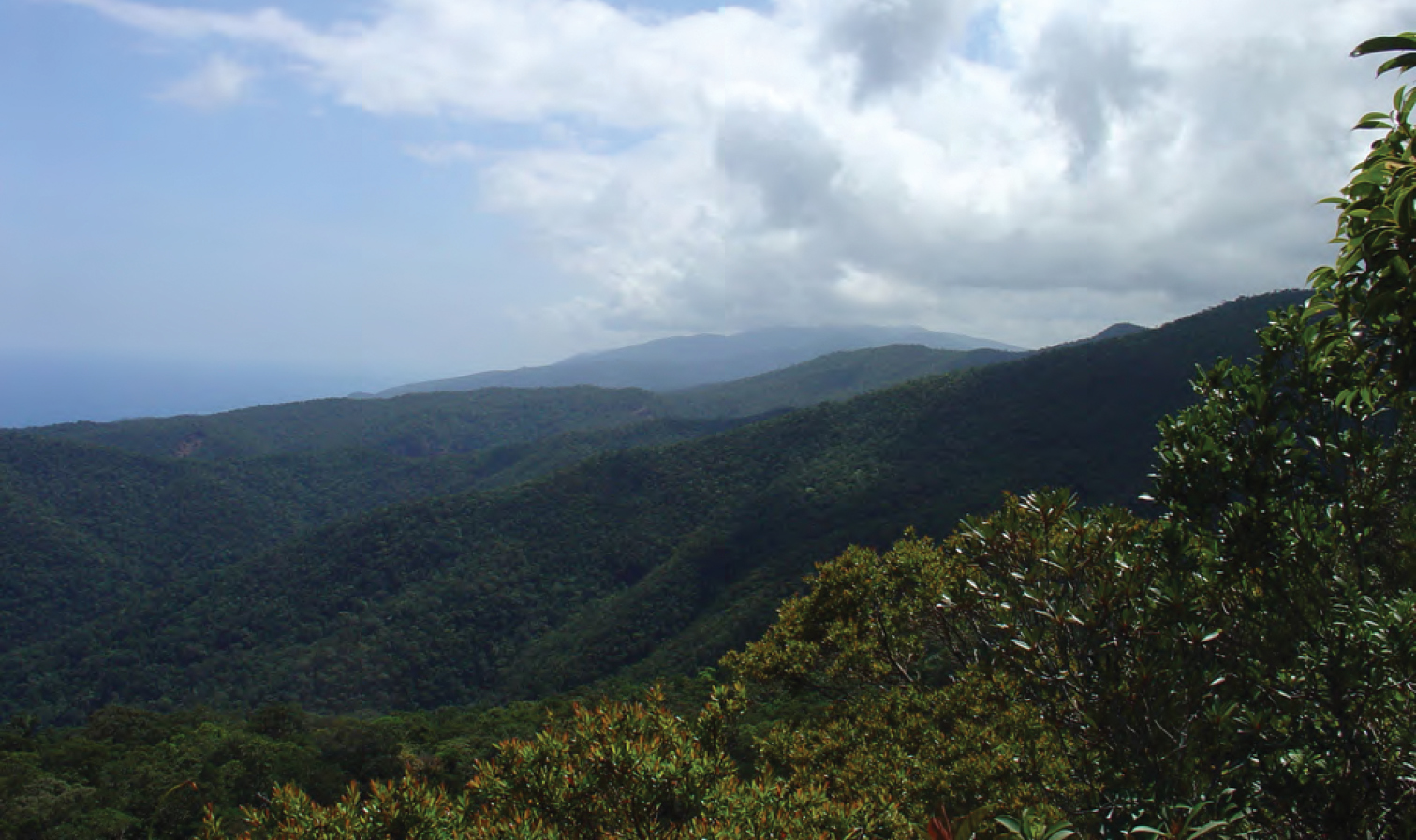
The Sierra Madre mountain range.

Above 1,000 metres (3,300 ft) elevation, the Luzon rain forests transition to the Luzon montane rain forests ecoregion. Montane rain forests are found in the Northern and Southern Sierra Madre, Mt. Sapacoy, Mt. Magnas, and Mt. Agnamala in the northern Cordillera Central highlands, and in the Zambales Mountains in the west. In the south of the island, enclaves of montane forest can be found on several volcanic and non-volcanic mountains that exceed meters in elevation. The volcanic mountains include Mt. Makiling, Mt. Banahaw, Mt. Isarog, Mayon Volcano, and Bulusan Volcano.

In some areas, annual rainfall can be about quadruple what the lowland rainforests receive (as high as 10,000 mm). The Sierra Madres have very mild seasons, with a slight dry period between December and April. The Zambales Mountains and northern Central Cordillera highlands are more strongly seasonal with a longer dry period and slightly less rainfall generally.

The dipterocarp trees of the lowlands are gradually replaced by oak and laurel forest species with increasing altitude. The forests generally have less undergrowth and become shorter in stature as altitude increases. With the decreasing temperature from increasing altitude, decomposition is slowed and results in a forest floor thick with humus.

In the montane forests, epiphytes, vines, and moss-covered branches are very common. The highest altitudes of montane forests are called upper montane forest, or elfin forest, and are more extreme: trees are shorter in stature, and tree branches are so thick with moss and organic material that they can sustain aerial plants that are not typically epiphytes. Many endemic animal species reside in the thick, matty soil of the upper montane forests.

In fact, species richness is greatest along the highest elevations of the montane rainforests of Luzon. Areas with the greatest levels of endemism are reported to be the Cordillera Central highlands, the Sierra Madre, the Zambales Mountains, and highlands on the Bicol Peninsula.

== Fauna ==
There are at least 31 endemic species of mammals on the island of Luzon. Sixty-eight percent of all known native non-flying mammals are endemic to the area (23 of 34).

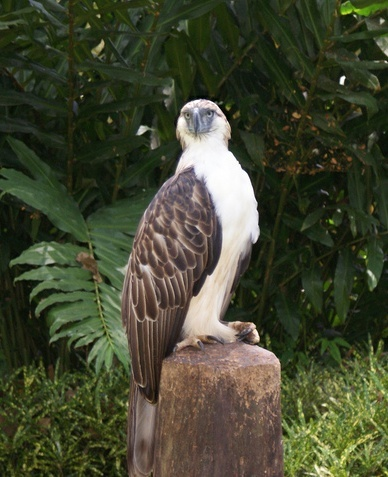
The Philippine eagle

The Philippine eagle (Pithecophaga jefferyi), one of the largest eagles in the world, is found primarily in the Sierra Madre of Luzon. Primary lowland rainforests of the Philippines have been heavily deforested, and the Philippine eagle needs this area to breed, as well as nesting in large trees and hunting within the trees. The eagle is restricted to the islands of Luzon, Samar, Leyte, and Mindanao. Attempts for captive breeding have been unsuccessful and it is estimated that less than 700 individuals remain.

Often called Myer’s snake in honor of Dr. George S. Myers, the genus Myersophis is represented only by the species alpestris. It is a snake found only in the northern highlands of Luzon.

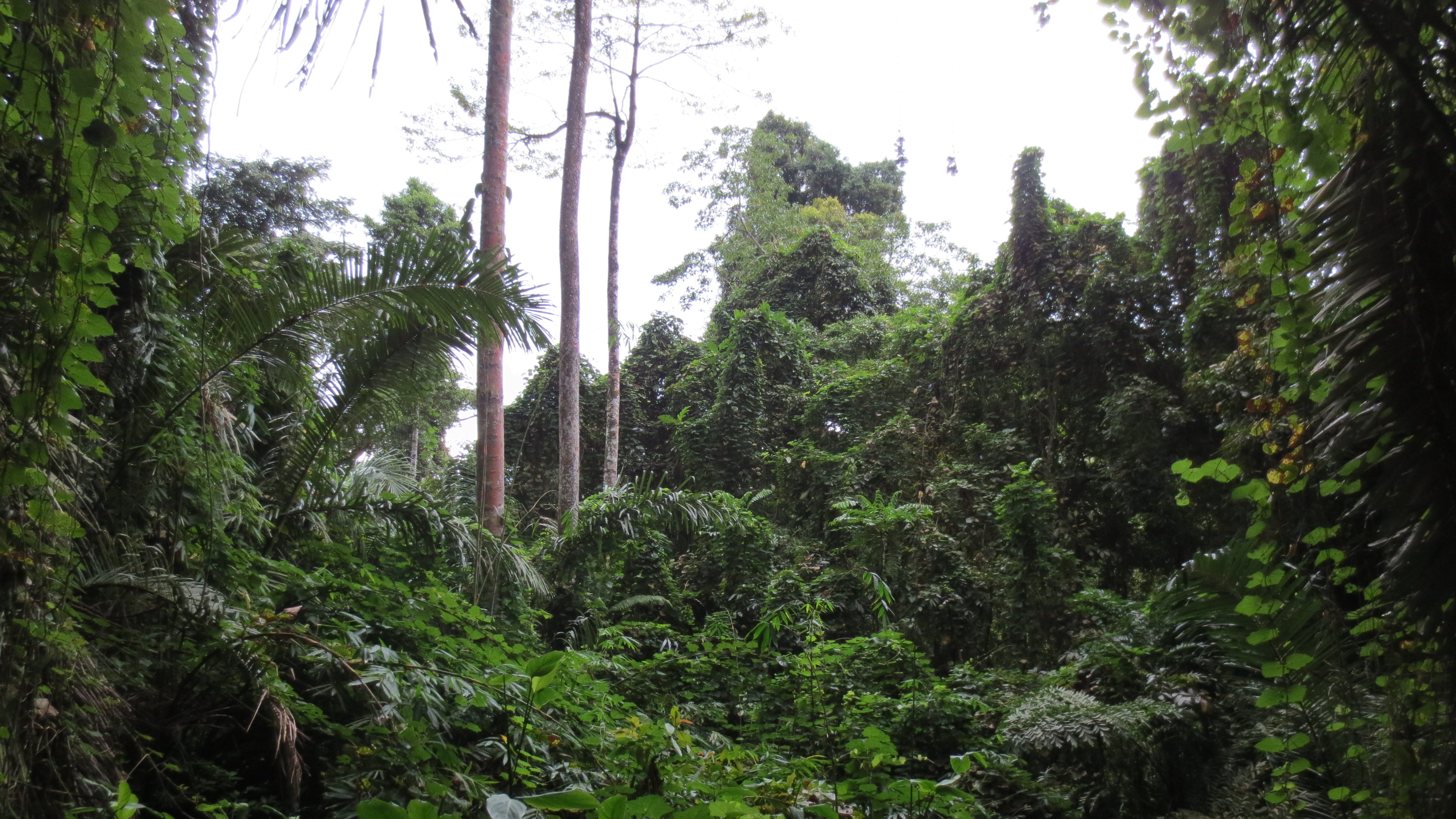
Opening in jungle canopy at Mount Makiling

About sixty-eight percent of all native reptiles are endemic to the area (about 160 of 235). The Philippine crocodile, Crocodylus mindorensis, is a freshwater crocodile that is considered the most threatened crocodile in the world and is endemic to the Philippines; it is only found in Mindanao, Negros, and Luzon. Wild populations in 1982 totaled somewhere between 500 and 1000 individuals. In 1995, this number decreased to a mere 100 individuals. The discovery of a population of this crocodile in the Northern Sierra Madre on Luzon gives hope for its conservation. Active in the conservation of Crocodylus mindorensis is the Crocodile Rehabilitation Observance and Conservation (CROC) Project of the Mabuwaya Foundation.

The Sierra Madres give hope to many other threatened animals by providing one of the largest areas of intact rainforest in the Philippines thereby maintaining the naturally high level of biodiversity. Many species of threatened birds are found in this location.

== Conservation ==
A 2017 assessment found that 9,994 km^{2}, or 11%, of the island is in protected areas. Protected areas in the ecoregion include:

- Aurora Memorial National Park (56.8 km^{2})
- Bawa River Watershed Forest Reserve (89.6 km^{2})
- Bulusan Volcano Natural Park (36.7 km^{2})
- Catanduanes Watershed Forest Reserve (260.1 km^{2})
- Marinduque Wildlife Sanctuary (88.3 km^{2})
- Mayon Volcano Natural Park (57.8 km^{2})
- Mount Isarog Natural Park (101.1 km^{2})
- Mount Makiling National Park (42.3 km^{2})
- Northern Sierra Madre Natural Park (3594.9 km^{2}). Also in the Luzon montane rain forests.
- Peñablanca Protected Landscape (1187.8 km^{2}). Also in the Luzon montane rain forests.
- Quezon Protected Landscape (9.8 km^{2})
- Taal Volcano Protected Landscape (622.9 km^{2})
- Upper Marikina River Basin Protected Landscape (261.26 km^{2}). Also in the Luzon montane rain forests.
- Wangag Watershed Forest Reserve (69.92 km^{2})

== See also ==
- Luzon
- Sierra Madre (Philippines)
- Cordillera Central (Luzon)
- Endemism
- Regions of the Philippines
