= Luzon montane rain forests =

Ecoregion in Luzon, the Philippines

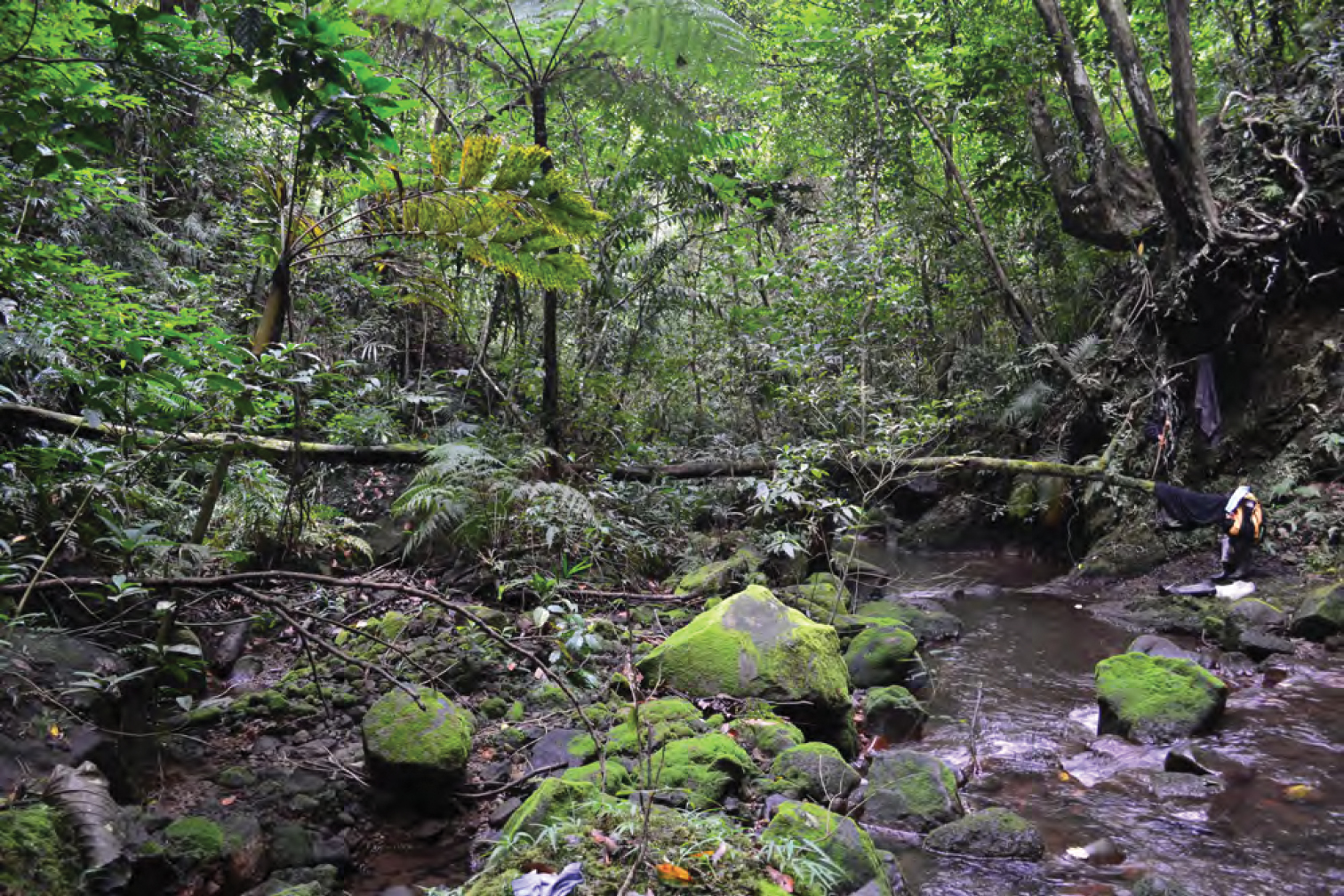
- Mature forest in the crater floor of Mount Cagua

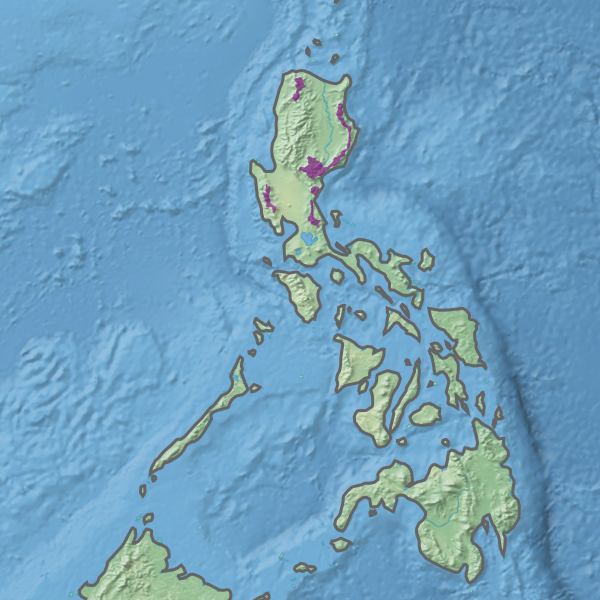
- Ecoregion territory (in purple)

Ecology
- Realm: Indomalayan
- Biome: tropical and subtropical moist broadleaf forests
- Borders: Luzon rain forests; Luzon tropical pine forests

Geography
- Area: 8,273 km^{2} (3,194 sq mi)
- Country: Philippines

Conservation
- Conservation status: Critical/endangered
- Protected: 3,813 km^{2} (46%)

The Luzon montane rain forests is a tropical moist broadleaf forest ecoregion on the island of Luzon in the Philippines. The ecoregion is located on several volcanic and non-volcanic mountains of the island. Luzon is the largest and northernmost major island of the Philippines, located in the western Pacific Ocean.

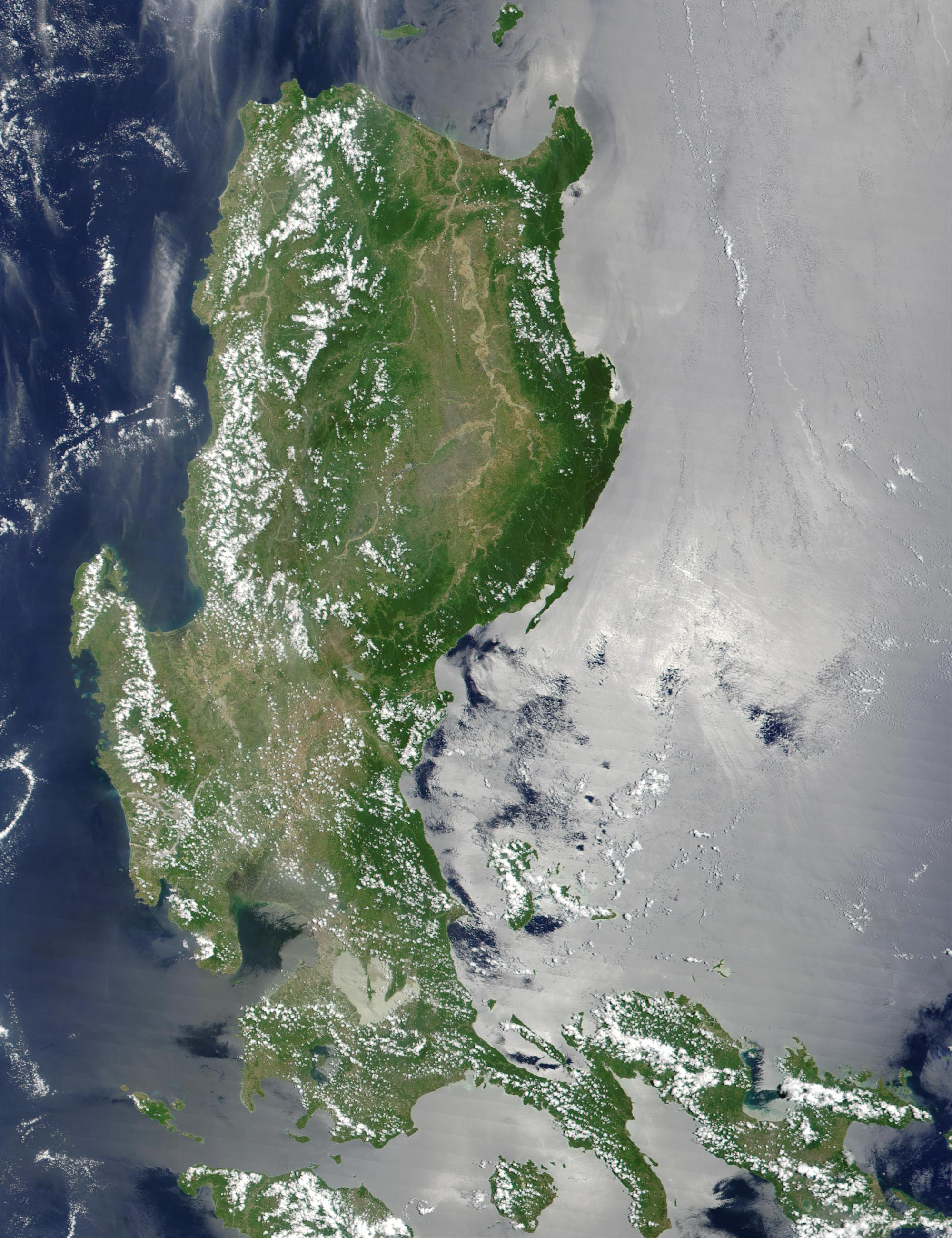
Satellite view of the island Luzon

== Geography ==
The ecoregion includes several volcanic and non-volcanic mountains that exceed 1,000 metres (3,300 ft) in altitude. The volcanic mountains include Mt. Makiling, Mount Banahaw, Mount Isarog, Mayon Volcano, and Bulusan Volcano. Also within the ecoregion are the Northern and Southern Sierra Madre, Mount Sapacoy, Mount Magnas, and Mount Agnamala in the northern Cordillera Central highlands and the Zambales Mountains in the west.

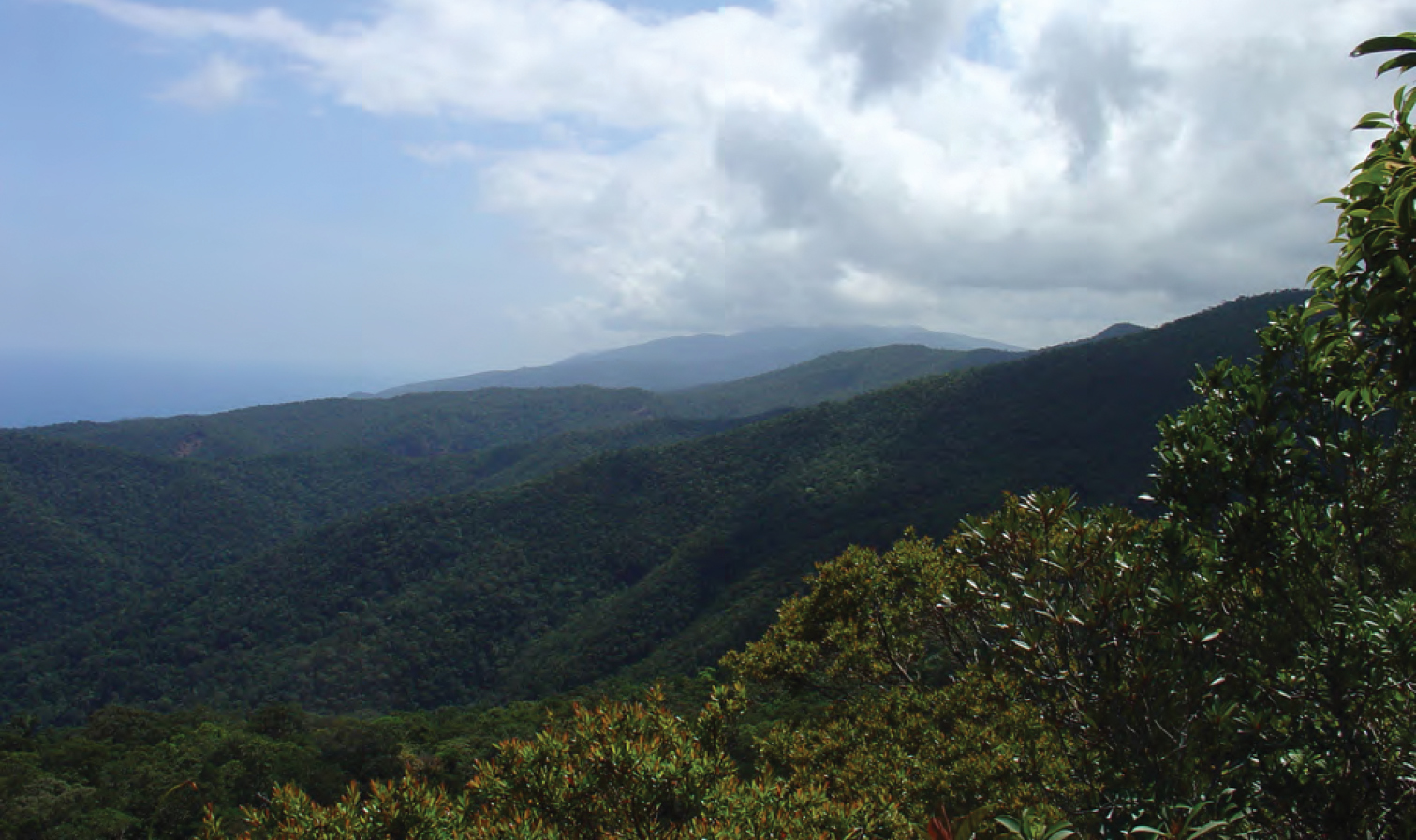
The Sierra Madre mountain range.

Luzon has never been connected to mainland Asia. Even when glacial advances during the Pleistocene caused sea levels to fall over 100 meters worldwide, this only connected Luzon to the modern islands of Polillo, Marinduque, and Catanduanes. At least 15 million years ago, friction between the Australian and Asian tectonic plates and volcanic activity created parts of the Luzon highlands, which over the next 10 million years morphed into their modern form. This long period of isolation and complex internal geography is a primary cause for the great biodiversity and high degree of endemism found on the island of Luzon.

== Climate ==
In some areas, annual rainfall can be about quadruple what the lowland rainforests receive (as high as 10,000 mm). The Sierra Madres have very mild seasons, with a slight dry period between December and April. The Zambales Mountains and northern Central Cordillera highlands are more strongly seasonal with a longer dry period and slightly less rainfall generally.

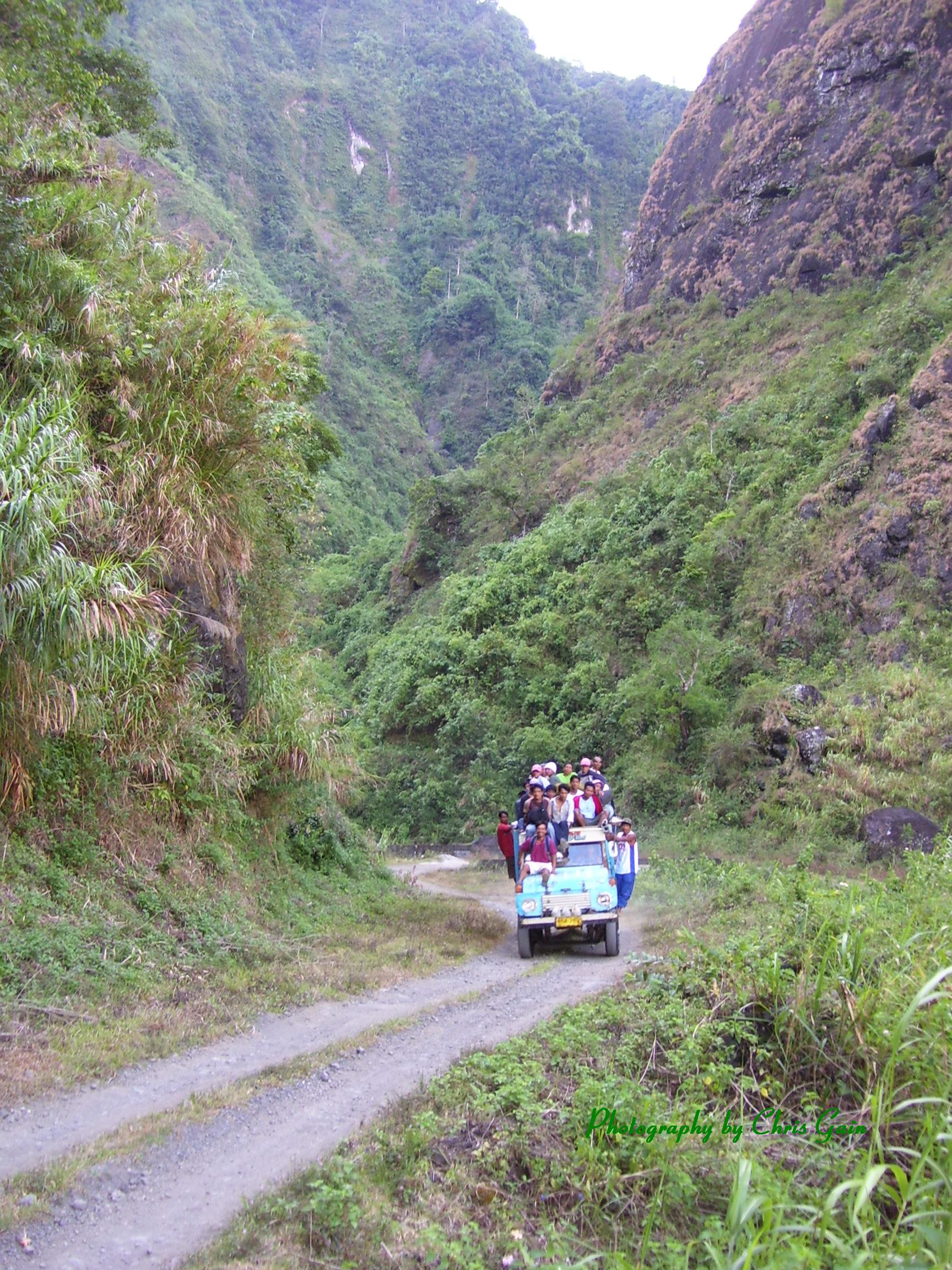
Batong Buhay jeep on its 5-hour once a day journey through the Cordillera Central to Tabuk, the capital of Kalinga province.

== Flora ==
The dipterocarp trees of the lowlands are gradually replaced by oak and laurel forest species with increasing altitude. The forests generally have less undergrowth and become shorter in stature as altitude increases. With the decreasing temperature from increasing altitude, decomposition is slowed and results in a forest floor thick with humus.

In the montane forests, epiphytes, vines, and moss-covered branches are very common. The highest altitudes of montane forests are caller upper montane forest, or elfin forest, and are more extreme: trees are shorter in stature, and tree branches are so thick with moss and organic material that they can sustain aerial plants that are not typically epiphytes. Many endemic animal species reside in the thick, matty soil of the upper montane forests.

In fact, species richness is greatest along the highest elevations of the montane rainforests of Luzon. Areas with the greatest levels of endemism are reported to be the Cordillera Central highlands, the Sierra Madre, the Zambales Mountains, and highlands on the Bicol Peninsula.

== Fauna ==
There are at least 31 endemic species of mammals on the island of Luzon. Sixty-eight percent of all known native non-flying mammals are endemic to the area (23 of 34).

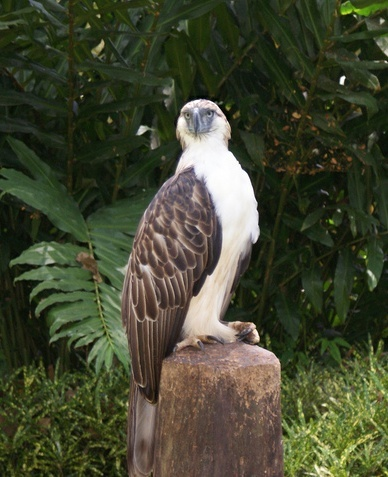
The Philippine eagle

The Philippine eagle (Pithecophaga jefferyi) is the second-largest eagle in the world found primarily in the Sierra Madre mountain range of Luzon. Primary lowland rainforests of the Philippines have been heavily deforested, and the Philippine eagle needs this area to breed, as well as nesting in large trees and hunting within the trees. The eagle is restricted to the islands of Luzon, Samar, Leyte, and Mindanao. Attempts for captive breeding have been unsuccessful and it is estimated that less than 700 individuals remain.

Often called Myer's snake in honor of Dr. George S. Myers, the genus Myersophis represented only by the species alpestris is a snake found only in the northern highlands of Luzon.

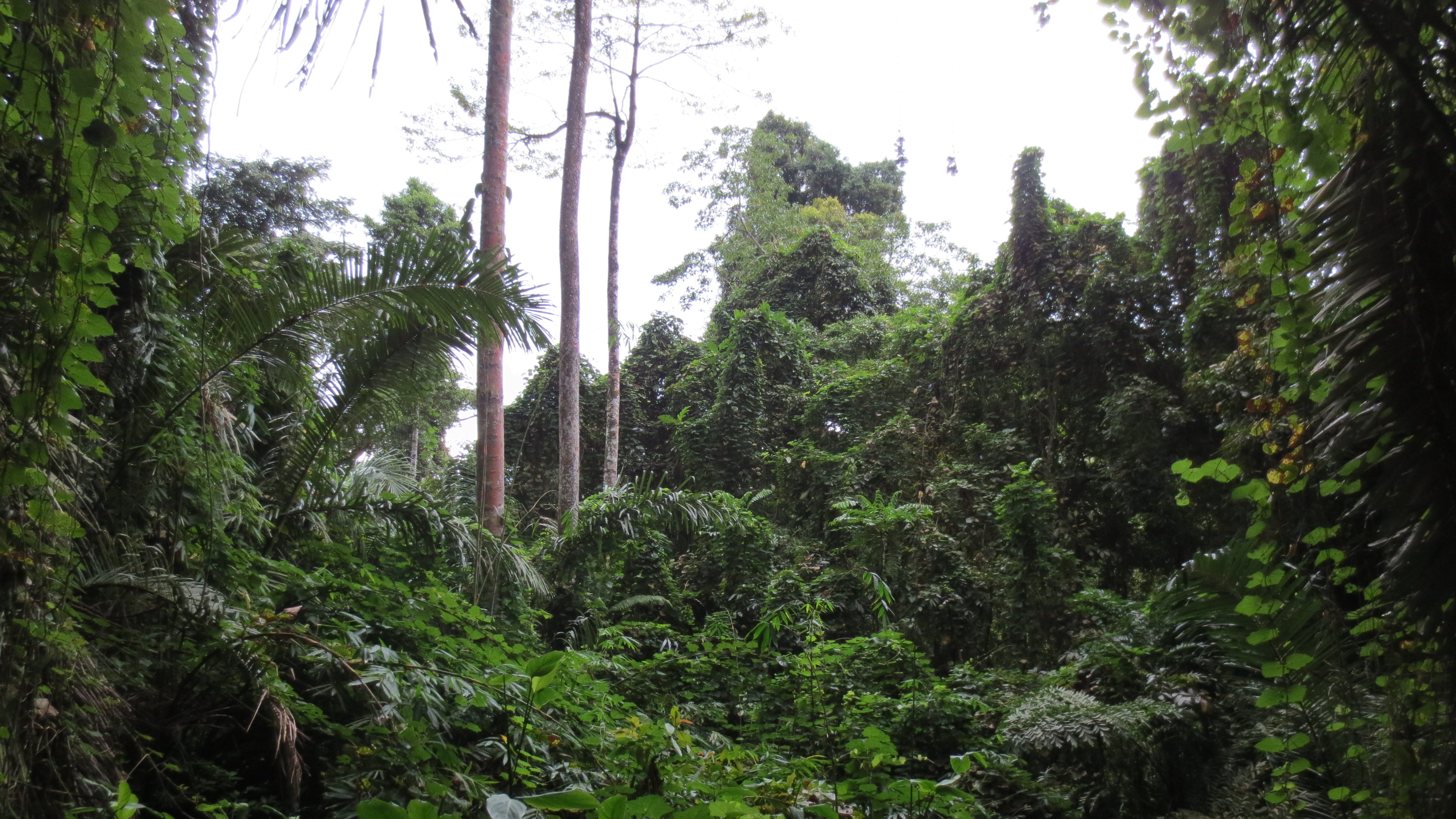
Opening in jungle canopy at Mount Makiling

About sixty-eight percent of all native reptiles are endemic to the area (about 160 of 235). The Philippine crocodile, Crocodylus mindorensis, is a freshwater crocodile that is considered the most threatened crocodile in the world and is endemic to the area; it is only found in Mindanao, Negros, and Luzon. Wild populations in 1982 totaled somewhere between 500 and 1000 individuals. In 1995, this number decreased to a mere 100 individuals. The discovery of a population of this crocodile in the Northern Sierra Madre on Luzon gives hope for its conservation. Active in the conservation of Crocodylus mindorensis is the Crocodile Rehabilitation Observance and Conservation (CROC) Project of the Mabuwaya Foundation.

== Conservation ==
A 2017 assessment found that 3,813 km^{2}, or 46%, of the ecoregion is in protected areas. Protected areas in the Luzon montane rain forests include:

- Casecnan Protected Landscape (888.47 km^{2}), established 2000.
- Northern Sierra Madre Natural Park (3594.86 km^{2}), established 2001. Also in the Luzon rain forests.
- Peñablanca Protected Landscape (1187.82 km^{2}), established 2003. Also in the Luzon rain forests.
- Quirino Protected Landscape (1643.64 km^{2}), established 2005.
