= Luzon tropical pine forests =

Terrestrial ecoregion in the Philippines

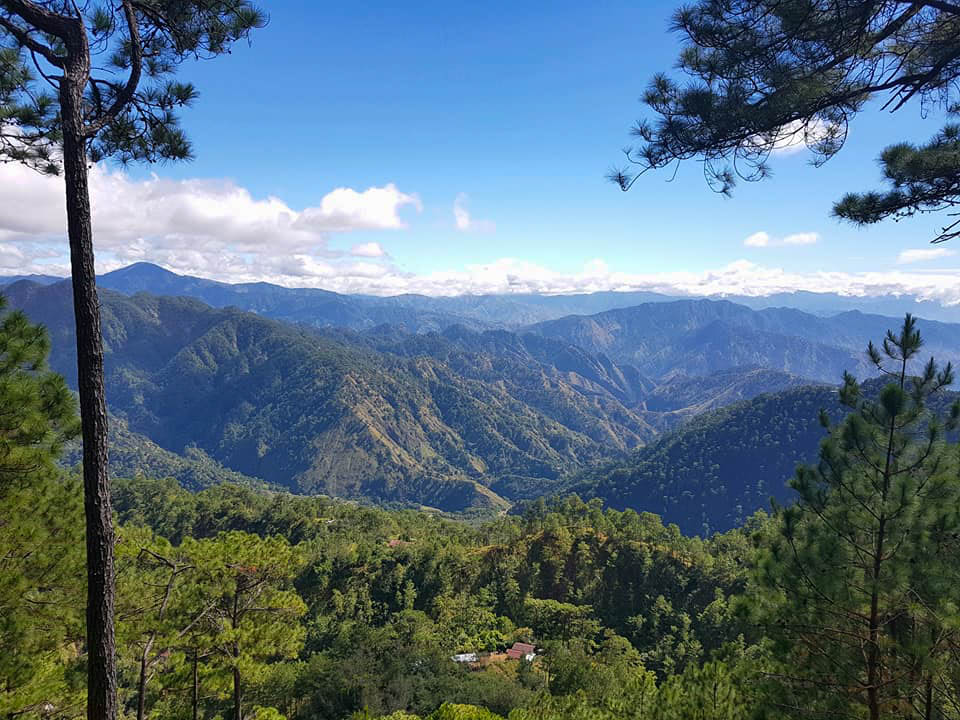
- Pine forest in Benguet

- Location of the Luzon tropical pine forests

Ecology
- Realm: Indomalayan
- Biome: tropical and subtropical coniferous forests
- Borders: Luzon montane rain forests; Luzon rain forests

Geography
- Area: 7,052 km^{2} (2,723 mi^{2})
- Country: Philippines

Conservation
- Conservation status: Critical/endangered
- Protected: 1,373 km² (19%)

The Luzon tropical pine forests are a tropical coniferous forest ecoregion of the Philippines in the western Pacific Ocean. These pine forests are home to a large number of the island's endemic plants and animals.

== Location and description ==
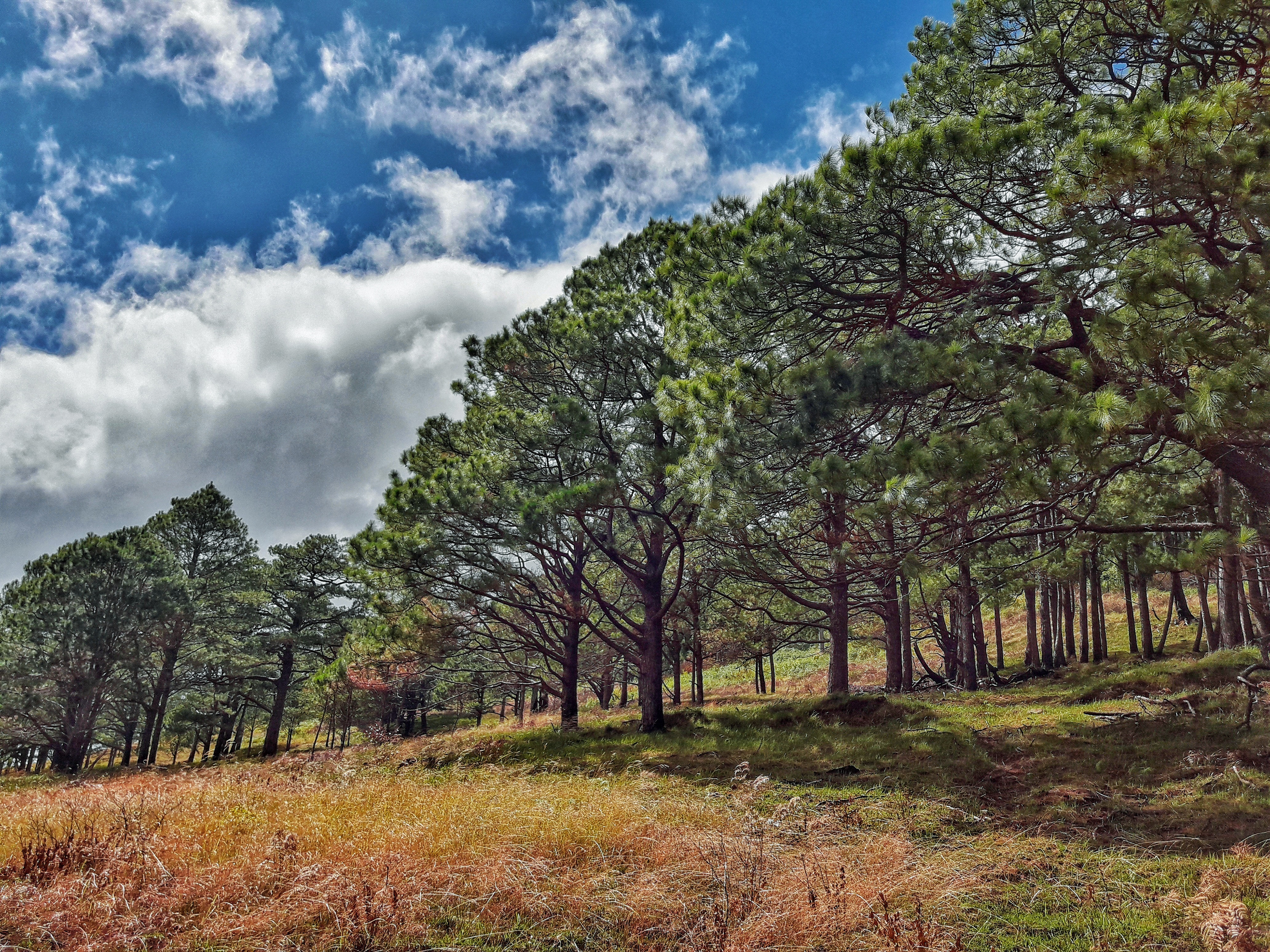
Pine forest in Zambales

Luzon is the largest island in the Philippines and lies at the north of the group of islands. These pine forests are found at elevations over 1000 m in the Cordillera Central mountains in the north of the island, where they are mixed in with areas of Luzon montane rain forests especially at the northern end of the range. The Cordillera Central includes Luzon's highest peak Mount Pulag along with other high peaks such as Mount Puguis, Mount Polis and Mount Data. Pine forests are also found in the Zambales Mountains of west-central Luzon, particularly in Mount Tapulao and Mount Redondo near Subic, Zambales.

Rainfall is high (over 2500 mm per year) but concentrated in the July/August monsoon with a long dry season from November to April.

== Flora ==
Luzon has long been isolated from other land masses so a unique flora has developed. In this ecoregion Benguet pine (Pinus kesiya) trees are thinly spread over the grasslands that cover the slopes. Regular fires in the dry season maintain the balance of pines and grassland and prevent other deciduous trees and shrubs from taking hold.

== Fauna ==
There are a number of mammals endemic to the Cordillera Central, mainly species of mice and rats including large squirrel-like cloud rats. Three larger mammals of the forest are the Philippine long-tailed macaque (Macaca fascicularis), Philippine warty pig (Sus philippensis), and Malayan civet (Viverra tangalunga) all of which are vulnerable to forest clearance while the pig and the macaque are prey for hunters. Birds of the pine forest include the pine-nut eating common crossbill, which is found in pine forests all over the world.

== Threats and preservation ==
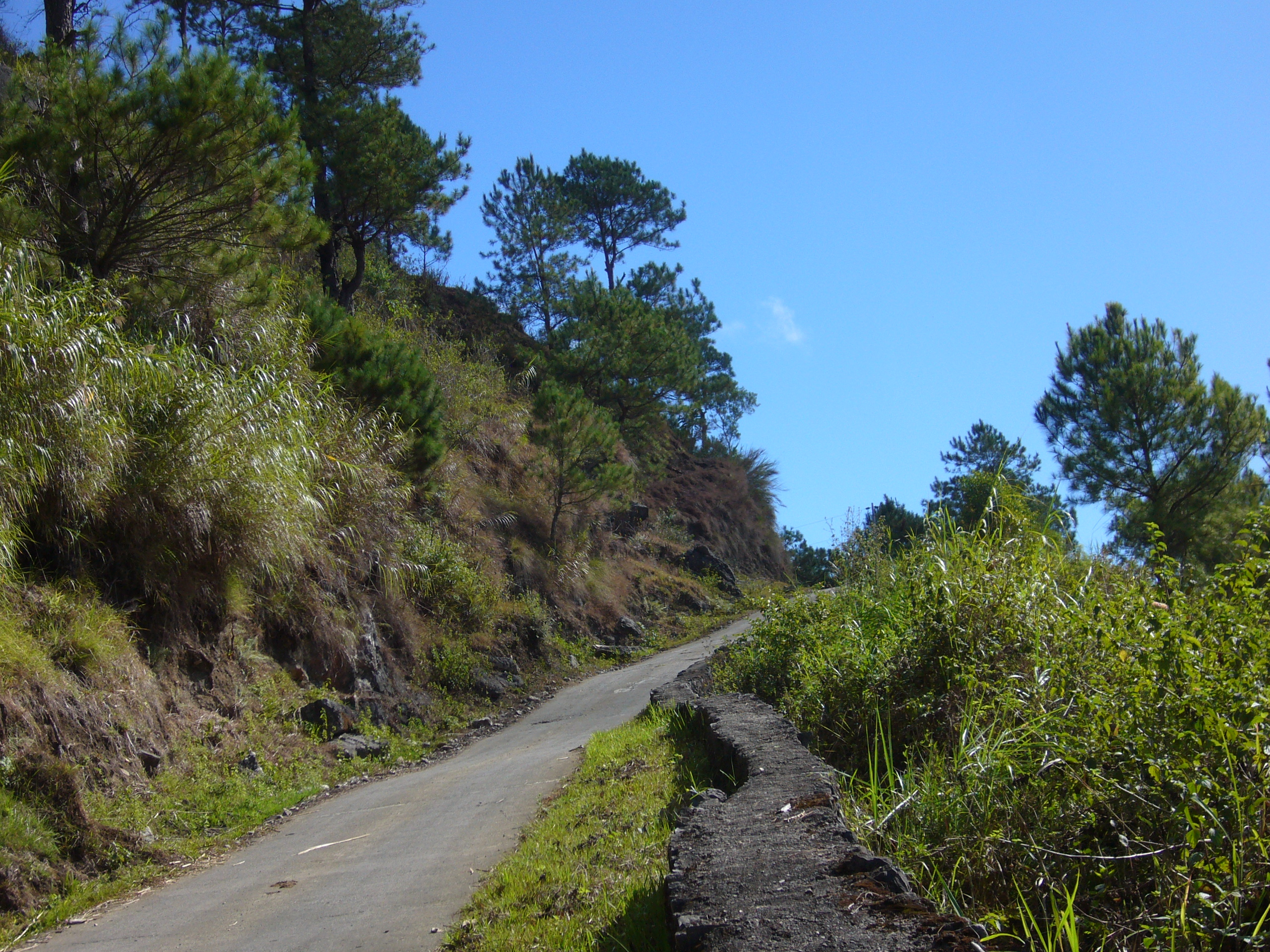
Pine trees along a road in Mountain Province

Pine trees have been cut down for timber, firewood and turpentine production for centuries and today this is intensified as forest is cleared for agriculture and copper and gold mining projects as the population of the Philippines grows and remains impoverished in these rural areas. In the dry season it is a straightforward process to set fires for forest clearance. Protected areas include Mount Pulag, home to a number of endemic plants and birds.

== See also ==
- Balbalasang-Balbalan National Park
