= Hologerrhum dermali =

Conservation status
- Endangered (IUCN 3.1)

Scientific classification
- Kingdom: Animalia
- Phylum: Chordata
- Class: Reptilia
- Order: Squamata
- Suborder: Serpentes
- Family: Cyclocoridae
- Genus: Hologerrhum
- Species: H. dermali

Binomial name
- Hologerrhum dermali R.M. Brown, Leviton, Ferner & Sison, 2001

Species of snake

Hologerrhum dermali, also known commonly as Crombie's stripe-lipped snake and Dermal's cylindrical snake, is a species of snake in the family Cyclocoridae. The species is endemic to the Philippines.

== Etymology ==
The specific name, dermali, is in honor of American herpetologist Ronald Crombie whose nickname is "Dermal".

== Geographic range ==
H. dermali is found on the island of Panay.

== Habitat ==
The preferred natural habitat of H. dermali is forest, at altitudes of 200–1,600 m (660–5,250 ft).

== Reproduction ==
H. dermali is oviparous.
