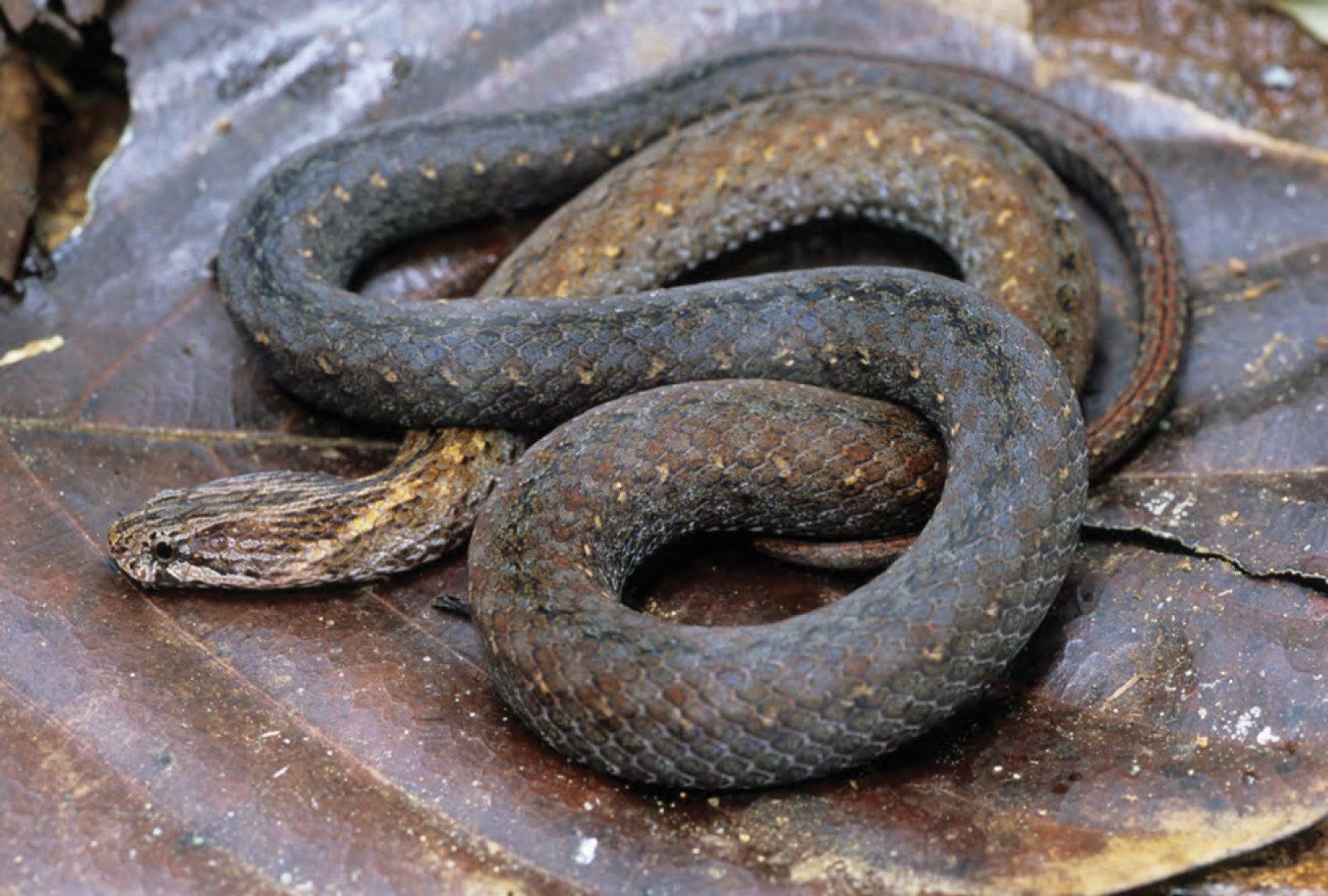
- Cyclocorus lineatus lineatus

Scientific classification
- Domain: Eukaryota
- Kingdom: Animalia
- Phylum: Chordata
- Class: Reptilia
- Order: Squamata
- Suborder: Serpentes
- Family: Cyclocoridae
- Genus: Cyclocorus; Duméril & Bibron, 1853
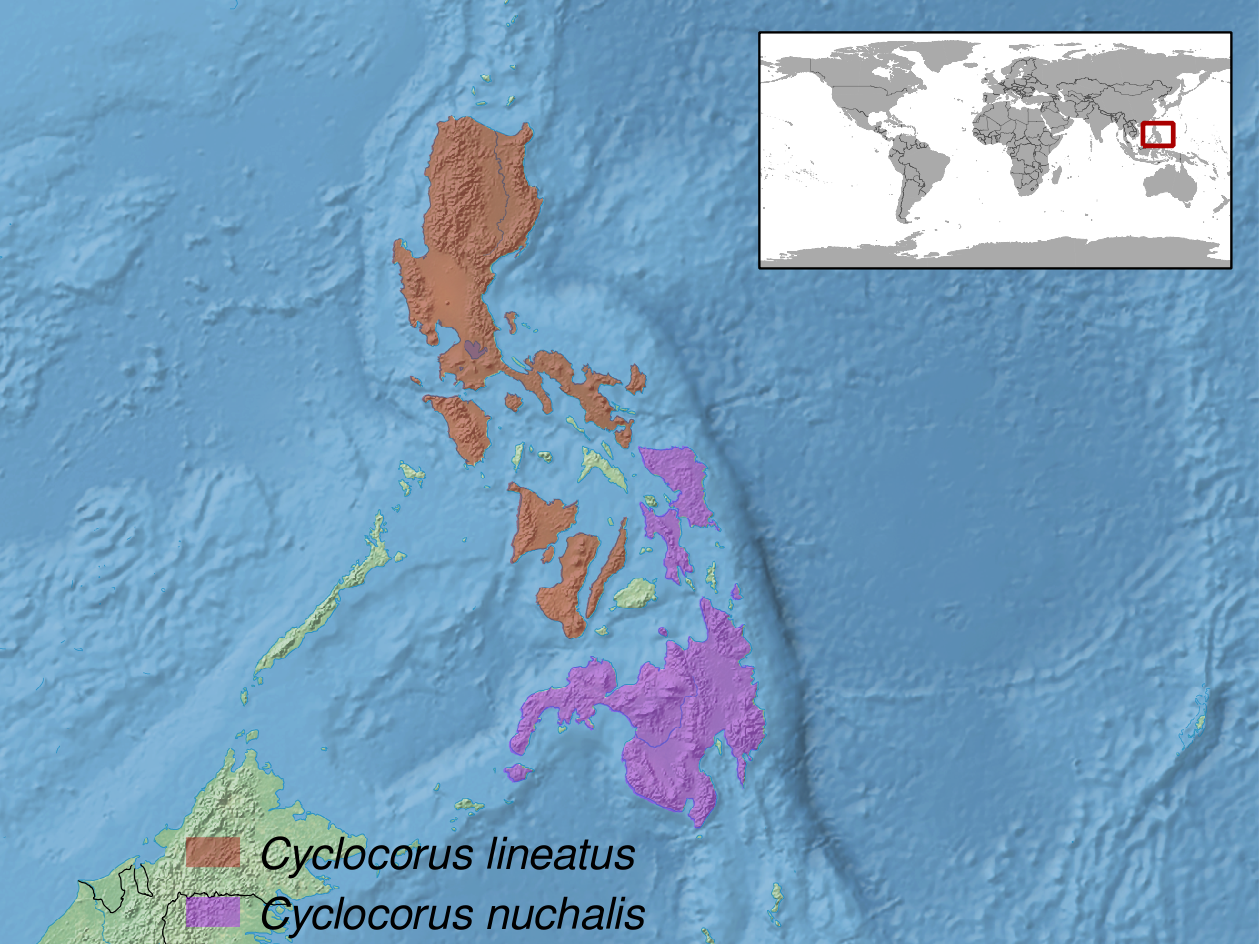

= Cyclocorus =

Genus of snakes

Cyclocorus is a genus of cyclocorid snakes endemic to the Philippines. They are found on every major island except for those of the Palawan chain.

Cyclocorus are found in forested areas on the ground beneath logs or in debris piles. They eat other snakes, including Pseudorabdion and Calamaria, as well as lizards and eggs. They breed during the rainy season (December to March) and lay 5 to 6 eggs underneath logs or in ant hills.

The average adult size of Cyclocorus is about 40 cm, and the maximum size is about 48 cm in total length. Cyclocorus are gray-brown with indistinct dark lines along the back, yellowish or white on the belly with many black blotches, and a series of tiny white dots along the sides of the belly. Snakes in this genus have small eyes with round pupils, smooth dorsal scales in 17 rows, and unusual dentition, wherein the anterior three to seven maxillary teeth increase in size, terminating in two very large fang-like teeth, followed by a short diastema and 12 to 15 smaller teeth.

== Species and subspecies ==
These species and subspecies have been described:

Cyclocorus lineatus (Reinhardt, 1843), Reinhardt's lined snake

- C. l. alcalai Leviton, 1967
- C. l. lineatus (Reinhardt, 1843)

Cyclocorus nuchalis Taylor, 1923, southern triangle-spotted snake

- C. n. nuchalis Taylor, 1923
- C. n. taylori Leviton, 1967
