= Levitonius =

Waray dwarf burrowing snake

Conservation status
- Data Deficient (IUCN 3.1)

Scientific classification
- Kingdom: Animalia
- Phylum: Chordata
- Class: Reptilia
- Order: Squamata
- Suborder: Serpentes
- Family: Cyclocoridae
- Genus: Levitonius; Weinell, Paluh, Siler & Brown, 2020
- Species: L. mirus

Binomial name
- Levitonius mirus Weinell, Paluh, Siler & Brown, 2020

Species of snake

Levitonius is a genus of cyclocorid snakes endemic to the Philippines. The only species in the genus is the Waray dwarf burrowing snake (Levitonius mirus). It is native to the Samar and Leyte islands in the Philippines, where it lives among 112 other land and snake species.

Levitonus is smaller than the other Cyclocoridae, reaching only a length of 172 millimetres (6.8 in). In addition, it has the smallest number of vertebrae of any snake, which is possibly related to its size. Its primary diet is earthworms.

Specimens of this genus had been collected in 2006 and 2007, and later again in 2014, but were misidentified. In 2018 a specimen of the genus was described as "Unnamed Leyte-Samar lineage". It is thought to be the most basal member of the family Cyclocoridae.

The genus is named after herpetologist Alan E. Leviton.
