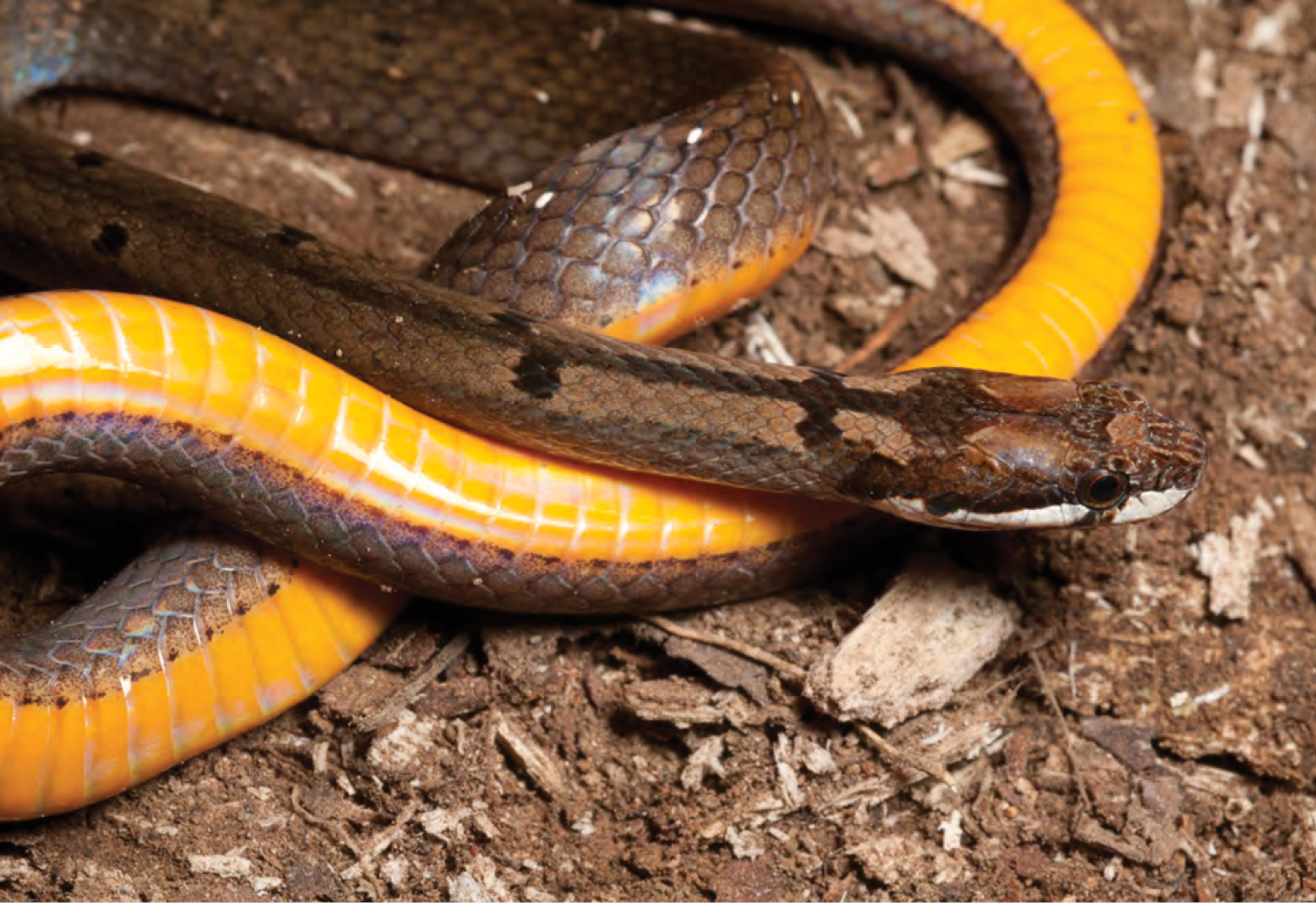

Conservation status
- Least Concern (IUCN 3.1)

Scientific classification
- Kingdom: Animalia
- Phylum: Chordata
- Class: Reptilia
- Order: Squamata
- Suborder: Serpentes
- Family: Cyclocoridae
- Genus: Hologerrhum
- Species: H. philippinum

Binomial name
- Hologerrhum philippinum Günther, 1858

Synonyms
- Cyclochorus maculatus Jan & Sordelli, 1870

= Hologerrhum philippinum =

Species of snake

Hologerrhum philippinum, commonly known as the Philippine stripe-lipped snake, is a species of snake in the family Cyclocoridae. It is endemic to the Philippines, and is found on the islands of Luzon and Polillo.
