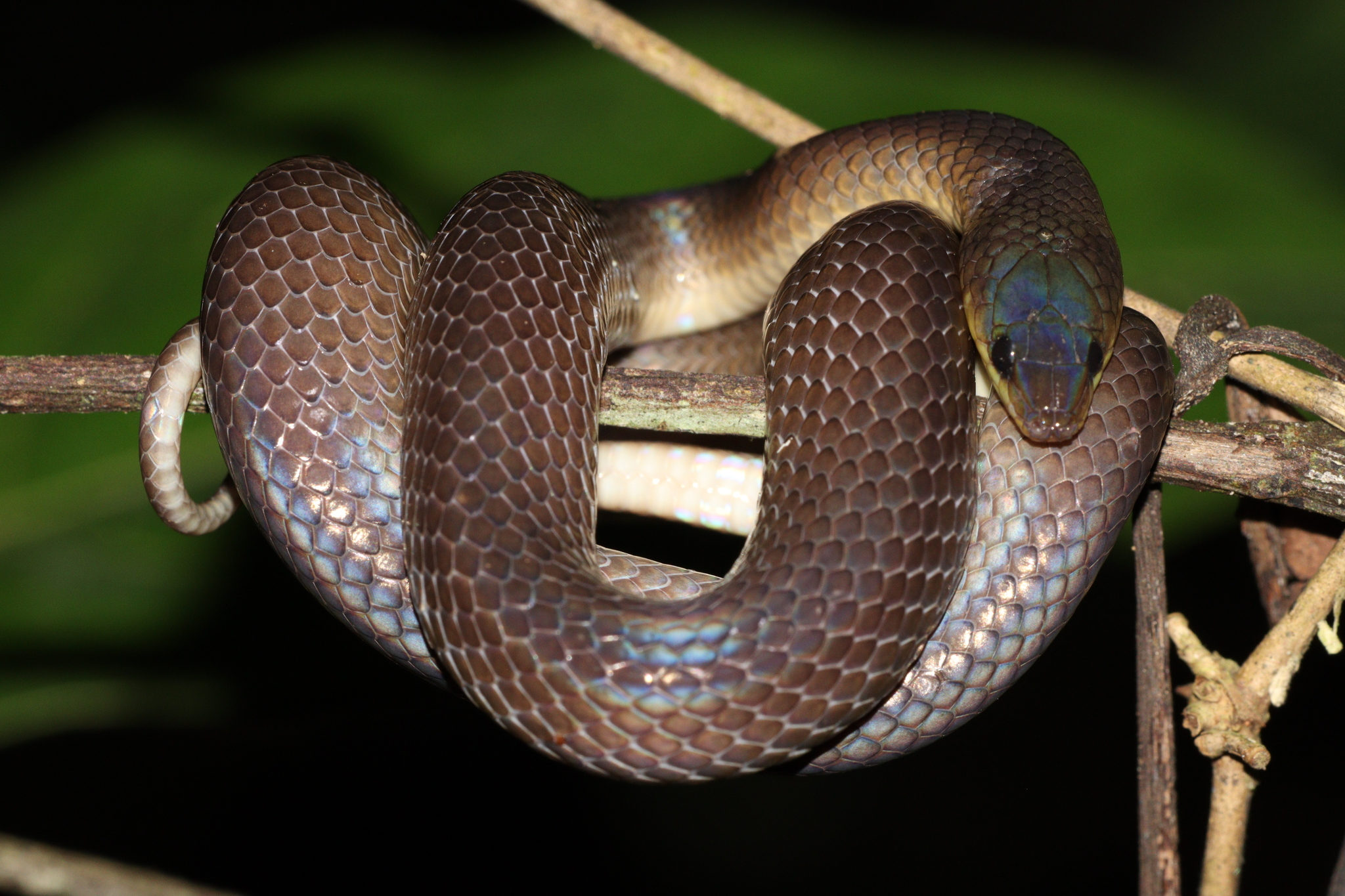

Conservation status
- Least Concern (IUCN 3.1)

Scientific classification
- Kingdom: Animalia
- Phylum: Chordata
- Class: Reptilia
- Order: Squamata
- Suborder: Serpentes
- Family: Cyclocoridae
- Genus: Oxyrhabdium
- Species: O. modestum

Binomial name
- Oxyrhabdium modestum (Duméril, 1853)

Synonyms
- Stenognathus modestus Duméril, 1853; Geophis schadenbergi Fischer 1885

= Oxyrhabdium modestum =

Species of snake

Oxyrhabdium modestum, commonly known as the Philippine shrub snake, is a species of snake in the family Cyclocoridae. It is found the Philippines on the islands of Basilan, Bohol, Dinagat, Leyte, Mindanao, Negros and Samar.
