= Myersophis =

Myers' mountain snake

Conservation status
- Data Deficient (IUCN 3.1)

Scientific classification
- Kingdom: Animalia
- Phylum: Chordata
- Class: Reptilia
- Order: Squamata
- Suborder: Serpentes
- Family: Cyclocoridae
- Genus: Myersophis; Taylor, 1963
- Species: M. alpestris

Binomial name
- Myersophis alpestris Taylor, 1963

Genus of snakes

Myersophis is a genus of snake in the family Cyclocoridae. The genus contains only one species, Myersophis alpestris, also known commonly as Myers' snake and Myers' mountain snake, which is endemic to the Philippines.

== Etymology ==
The genus Myersophis is named in honor of George Sprague Myers, who was an American herpetologist and ichthyologist.

== Geographic distribution and habitat ==
Myersophis alpestris is only known from two specimens collected near Banaue from Mountain Province in northern Luzon. Both were collected at 1,980 metres (6,500 ft) above sea level. Nothing else is known about this species, such as its habitat.

== Reproduction ==
Myersophis alpestris is oviparous.

== Taxonomy ==
A 2017 phylogenetic study found Myersophis to be the sister group to the genus Oxyrhabdium (both genera having diverged during the Oligocene), and assigned both, alongside some other Philippine endemic snake genera, to the new subfamily Cyclocorinae. Later studies uplifted Cyclocorinae to being its own family, Cyclocoridae.
