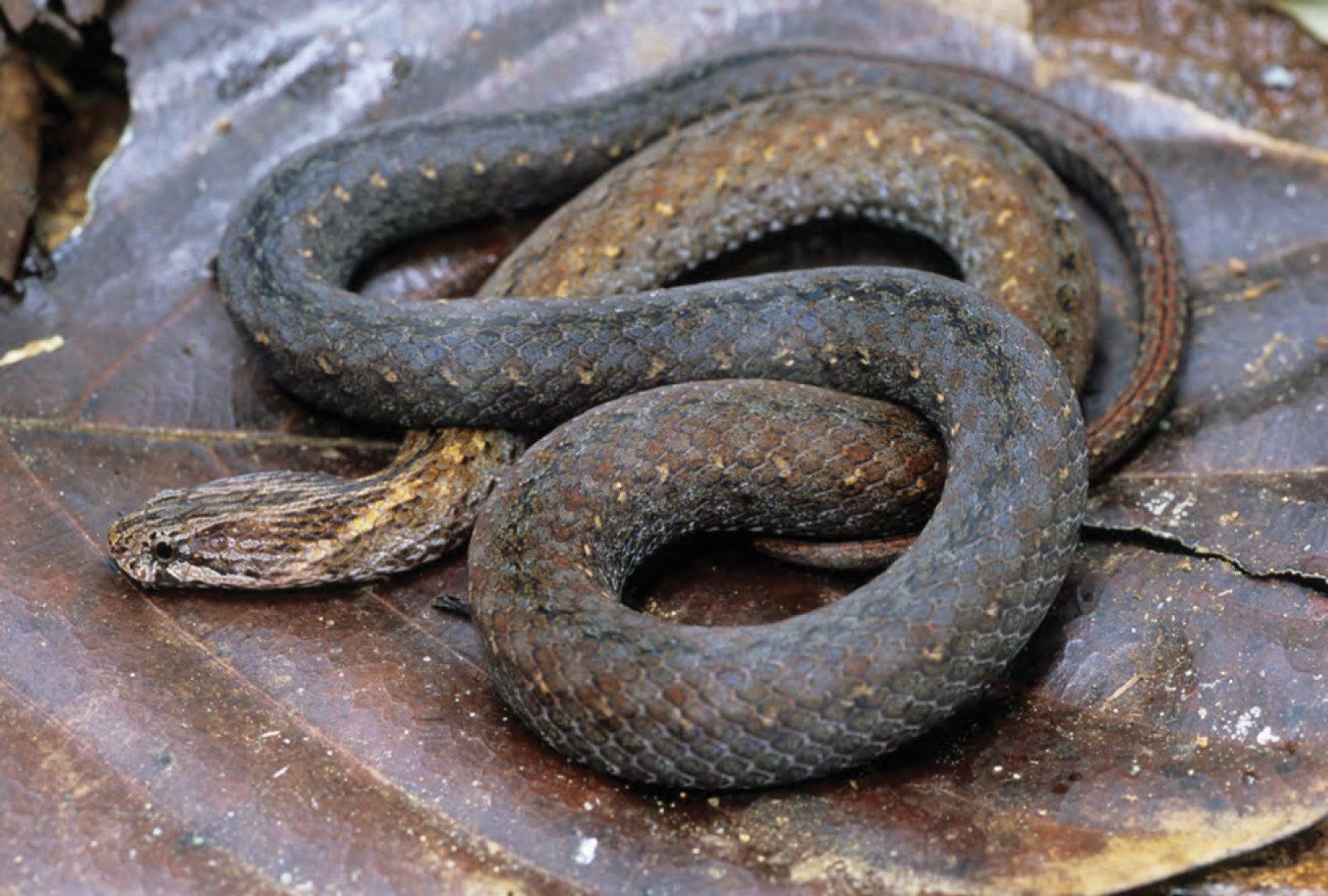
- Cyclocorus lineatus lineatus

Conservation status
- Least Concern (IUCN 3.1)

Scientific classification
- Kingdom: Animalia
- Phylum: Chordata
- Class: Reptilia
- Order: Squamata
- Suborder: Serpentes
- Family: Cyclocoridae
- Genus: Cyclocorus
- Species: C. lineatus

Binomial name
- Cyclocorus lineatus (Reinhardt, 1843)
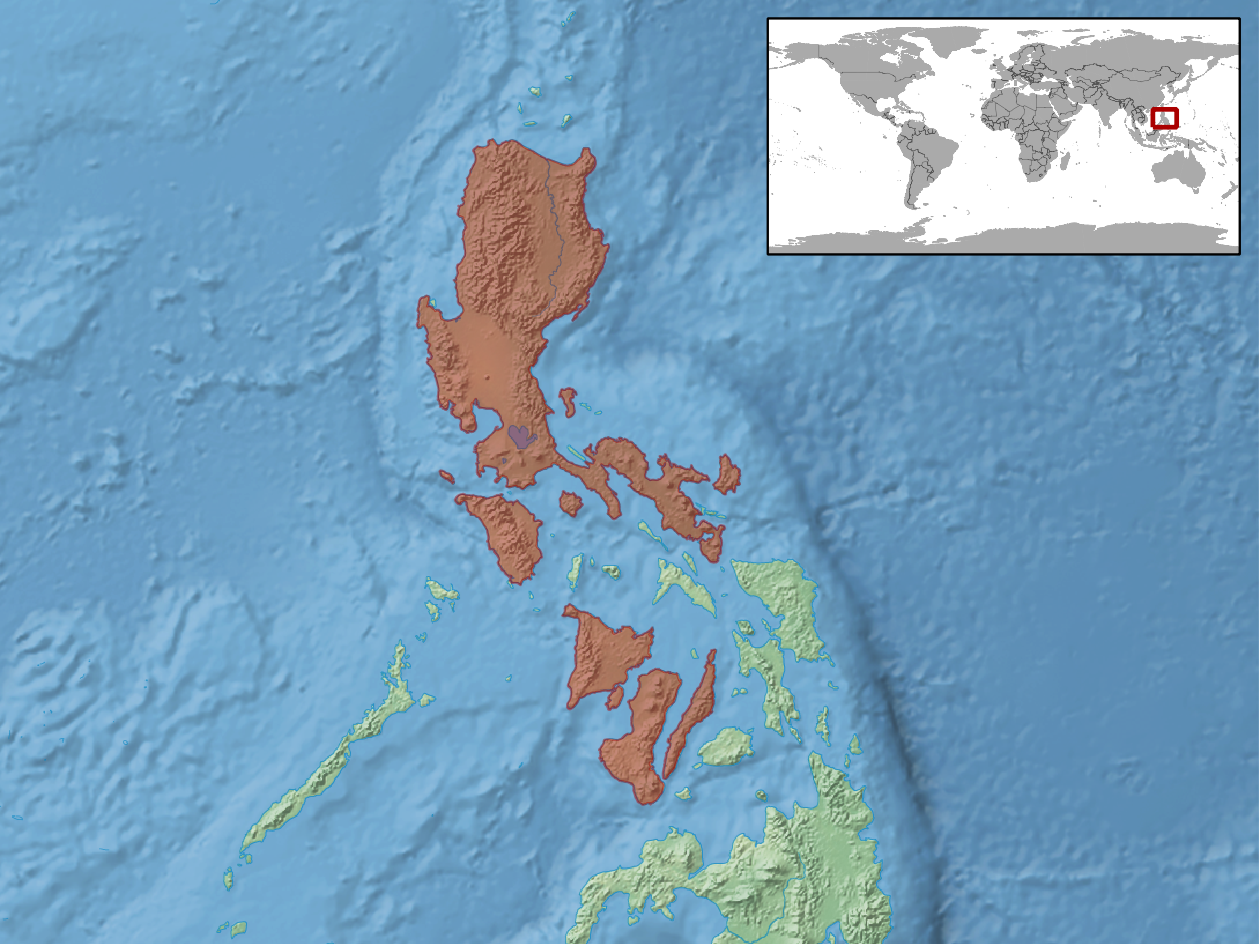

Synonyms
- Lycodon lineatus Reinhardt, 1843

= Cyclocorus lineatus =

Species of snake

Cyclocorus lineatus, commonly known as Reinhardt's lined snake, is a species of snake in the family Cyclocoridae. It is endemic to the Philippines.

== Subspecies ==
Two subspecies are recognized:

- Cyclocorus lineatus alcalai Leviton, 1967
- Cyclocorus lineatus lineatus (Reinhardt, 1843)
