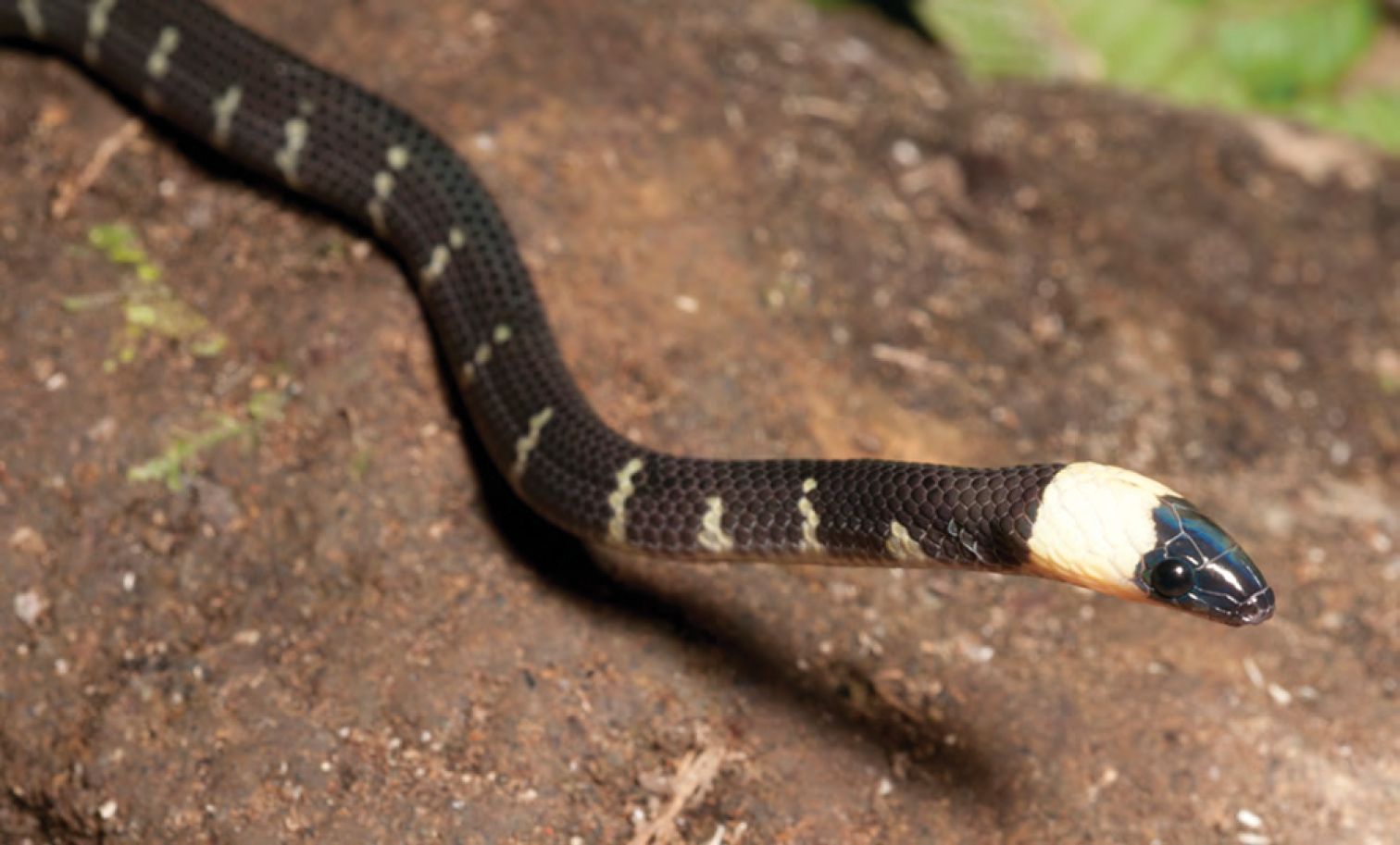
- Oxyrhabdium leporinum leporinum

Conservation status
- Least Concern (IUCN 3.1)

Scientific classification
- Domain: Eukaryota
- Kingdom: Animalia
- Phylum: Chordata
- Class: Reptilia
- Order: Squamata
- Suborder: Serpentes
- Family: Cyclocoridae
- Genus: Oxyrhabdium
- Species: O. leporinum

Binomial name
- Oxyrhabdium leporinum (Günther, 1858)

Synonyms
- Rhabdosoma leporinum Günther, 1858; Stenognathus brevirostris Peters, 1872

= Oxyrhabdium leporinum =

Species of snake

Oxyrhabdium leporinum, known as Günther's Philippine shrub snake, is a species of snake in the family Cyclocoridae. It is endemic to the Philippines, where it is found on the islands of Luzon, Mindoro, Cebu, Negros, and Panay.

It was first described in 1858 by Albert Günther, as Rhabdosoma leporinum, in his Catalogue of Colubrine snakes of the British Museum. The type locality is "near the headwaters of Maite River, appr. 3,000 feet, Cuernos de Negros, Negros Oriental Province, Negros Island, Philippines". It is considered a species of least concern on the IUCN Red List of Threatened Species due to its large population, tolerance of some habitat degradation, and its broad distribution, though the subspecies Oxyrhabdium leporinum visayanum may be threatened.

Two subspecies are recognized:

- Oxyrhabdium leporinum leporinum (Günther, 1858)
- Oxyrhabdium leporinum visayanum Leviton, 1958
