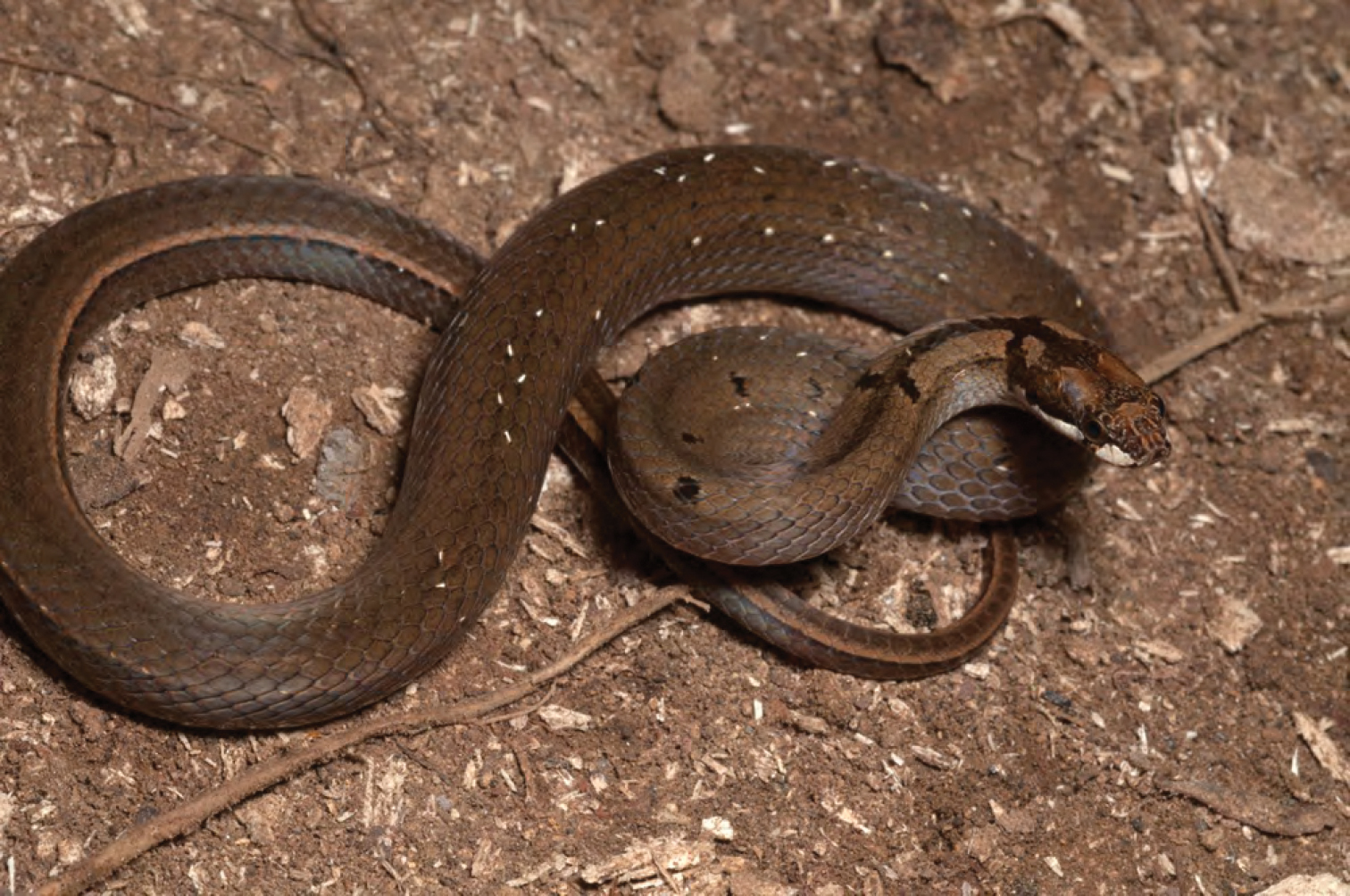
- Hologerrhum philippinum

Scientific classification
- Kingdom: Animalia
- Phylum: Chordata
- Class: Reptilia
- Order: Squamata
- Suborder: Serpentes
- Family: Cyclocoridae
- Genus: Hologerrhum; Günther, 1858

= Hologerrhum =

Genus of snakes

Hologerrhum is a genus of snakes in the family Cyclocoridae.

== Geographic range ==
The genus Hologerrhum is endemic to the Philippines.

== Species ==
The genus Hologerrhum contains two species which are recognized as being valid.

- Hologerrhum dermali R.M. Brown, Leviton, Ferner & Sison, 2001 - Crombie's stripe-lipped snake, Dermal's cylindrical snake
- Hologerrhum philippinum Günther, 1858 - Philippine stripe-lipped snake
