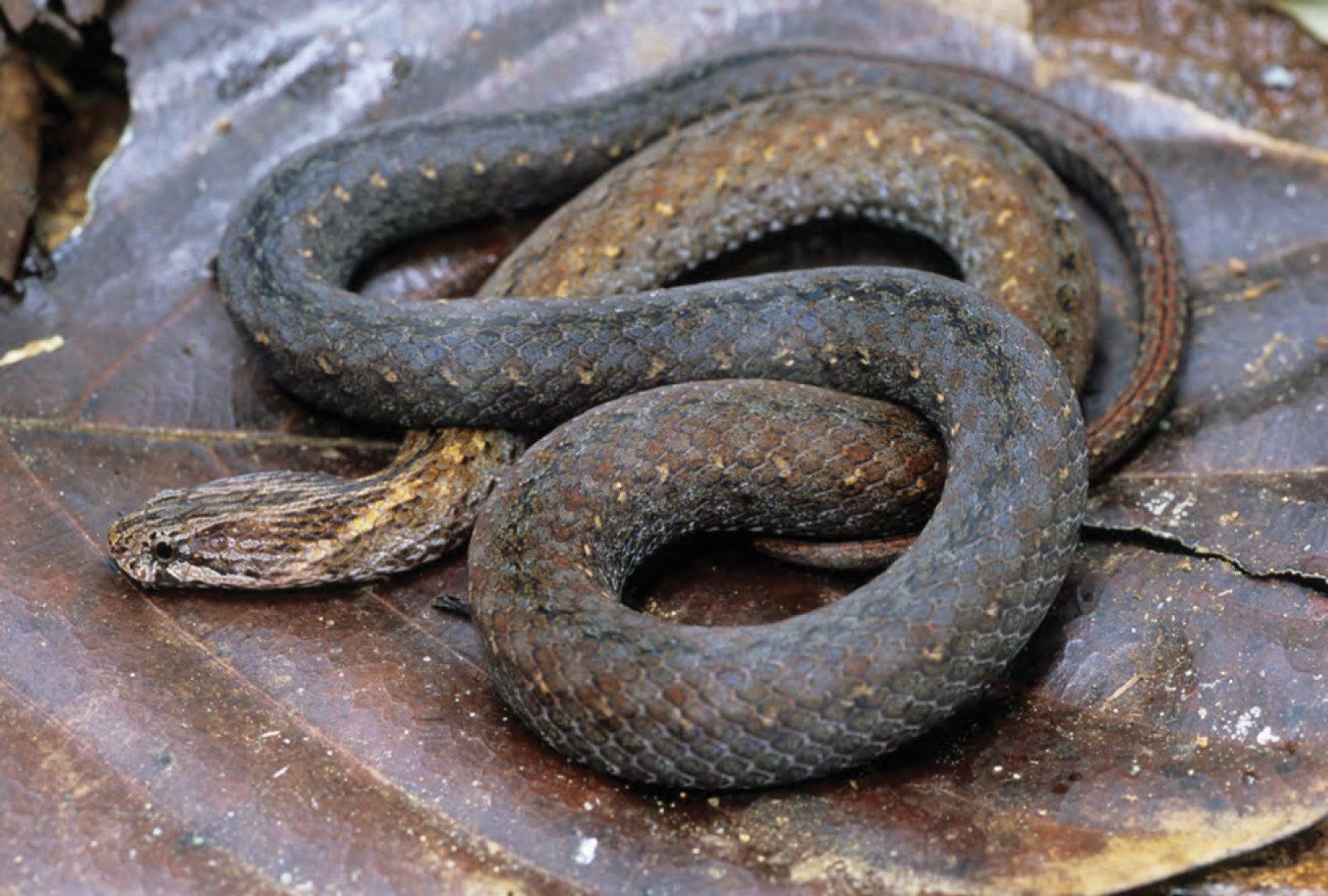
- Cyclocorus lineatus lineatus

Scientific classification
- Kingdom: Animalia
- Phylum: Chordata
- Class: Reptilia
- Order: Squamata
- Suborder: Serpentes
- Superfamily: Elapoidea
- Family: Cyclocoridae; Weinell & Brown, 2017

Genera
- Cyclocorus; Hologerrhum; Myersophis; Oxyrhabdium; Levitonius

= Cyclocoridae =

Family of snakes

Cyclocoridae is a family of elapoid snakes endemic to the Philippines.

== Taxonomy ==
It was initially erected as a subfamily (Cyclocorinae) in 2017 to house four enigmatic, endemic genera containing seven species and one then-undescribed lineage that are more closely related to one another than to members of the families Atractaspididae or to other former subfamilies of the Lamprophiidae. The undescribed lineage was described in 2020 as the new genus Levitonius.

Previously placed within the Colubridae, a 2017 study by Weinell et al. found strong support the monophyly of Cyclocorinae within Lamprophiidae, but its position relative to the other subfamilies of Lamprophiidae is not resolved. Cyclocorinae was found to be a possible sister group to the Atractaspidinae. In 2019, they were reclassified as a distinct family Cyclocoridae, alongside many former members of Lamprophiidae, as Lamprophiidae was found to be otherwise paraphyletic with respect to Elapidae.

The Cyclocoridae likely began to diverge from their closest relatives, the Atractaspididae, beginning 35-40 million years ago (late Eocene). All extant genera within the family had diverged by the early Oligocene, and all extant species had evolved by the Miocene. Because snakes of this subfamily are not known from Palawan Island, their method of dispersal from mainland Asia to the Philippine archipelago must have differed from that of most Philippine reptiles and amphibians, which are thought to have rafted over on the Palawan "Ark".

The members of this subfamily are among the most poorly known snakes in the world. Very little information is available on their geographic distribution, ecology, behavior, or conservation status. Despite high support for a close relationship from DNA, no unambiguous morphological characteristics unite these five genera.

== Genera and species ==
The five genera, three with two species each and two with one species, are:

- Genus Cyclocorus
  - C. lineatus
  - C. nuchalis
- Genus Levitonius
  - L. mirus
- Genus Hologerrhum
  - H. philippinum
  - H. dermali
- Genus Myersophis
  - M. alpestris
- Genus Oxyrhabdium
  - O. leporinum
  - O. modestum

== Gallery ==
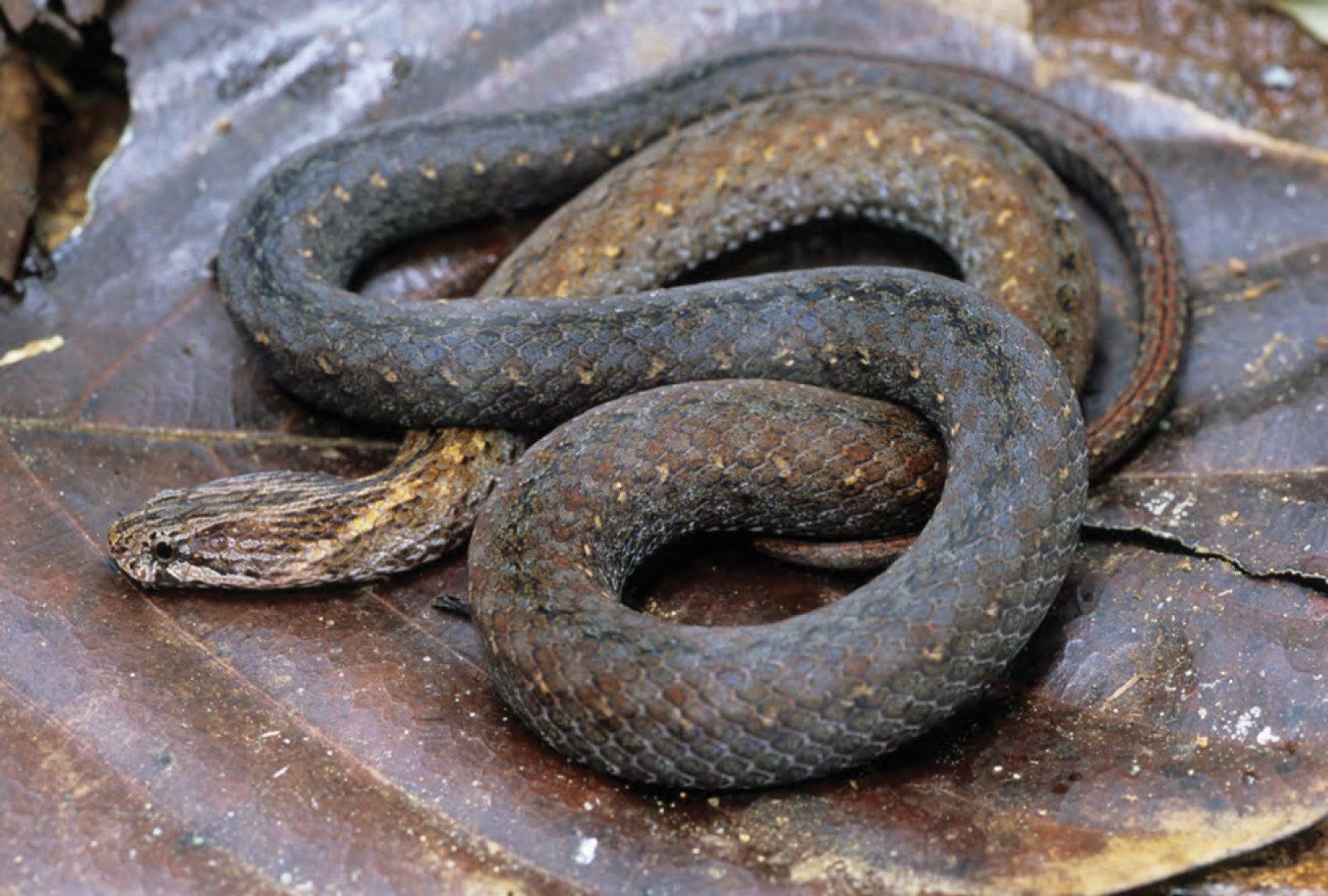
Cyclocorus type species; Reinhardt's lined snake (C. lineatus)

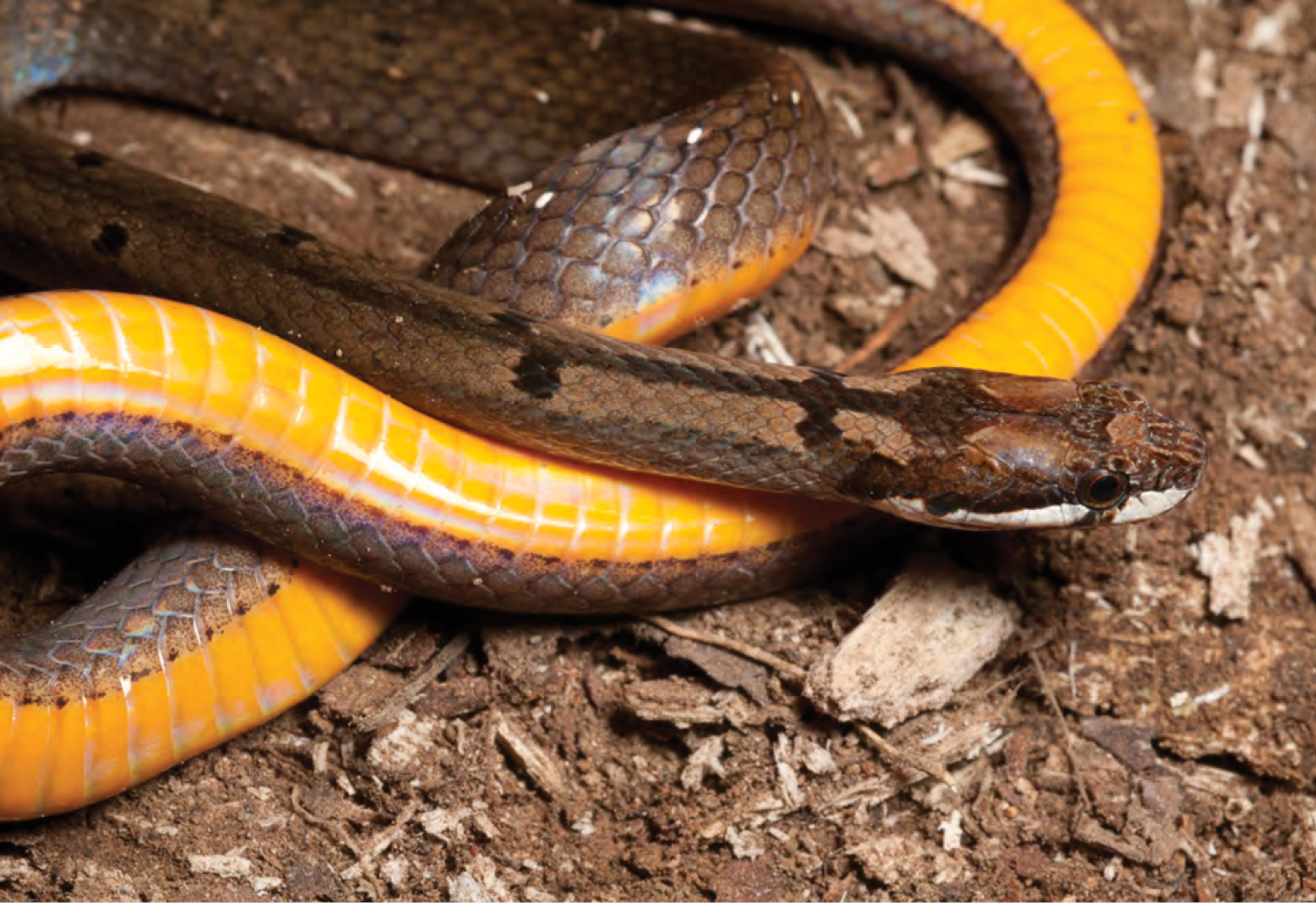
Hologerrhum type species; Philippine stripe-lipped snake (H. philippinum)

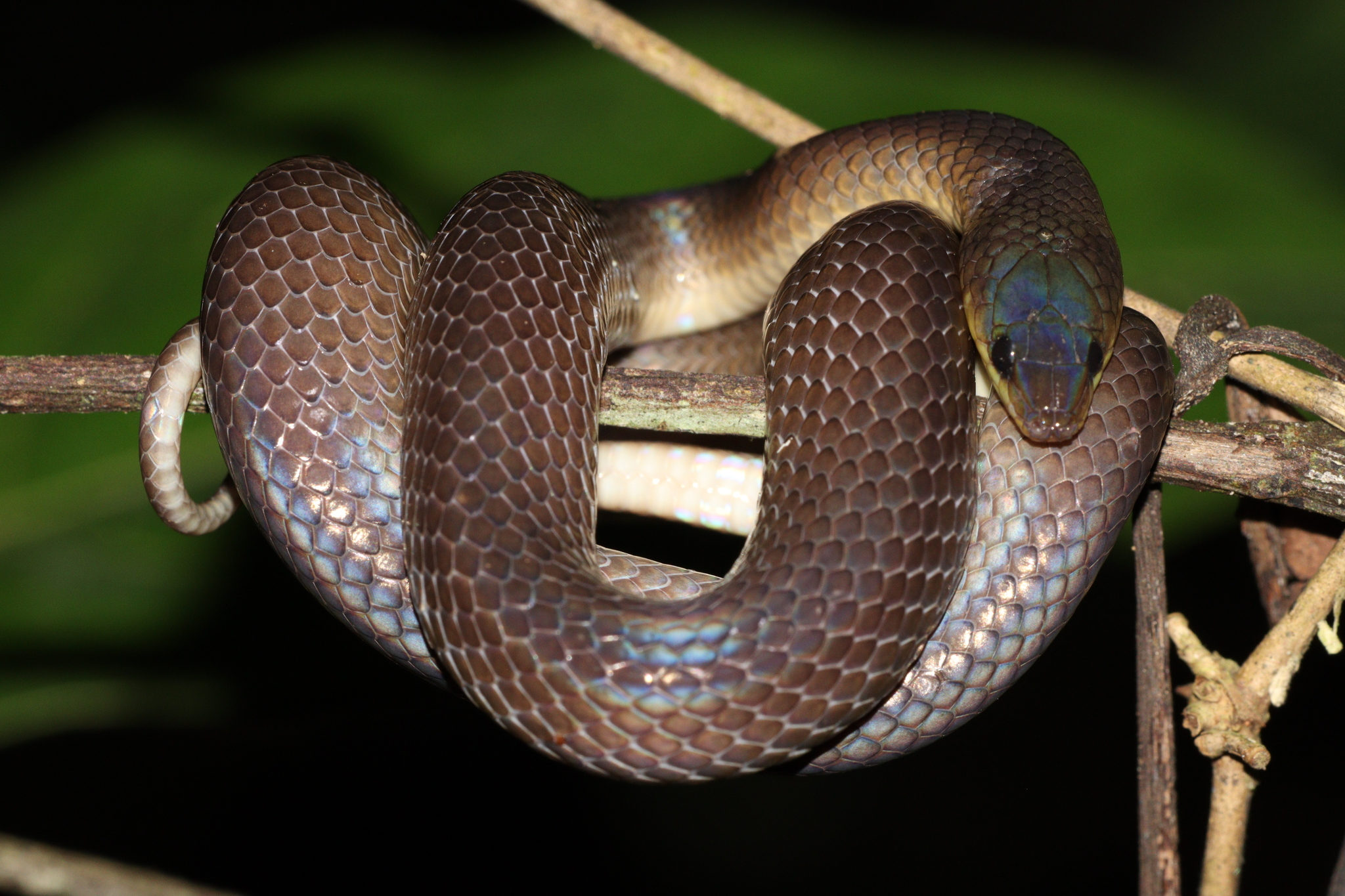
Oxyrhabdium type species; Philippine shrub snake (O. modestum)
