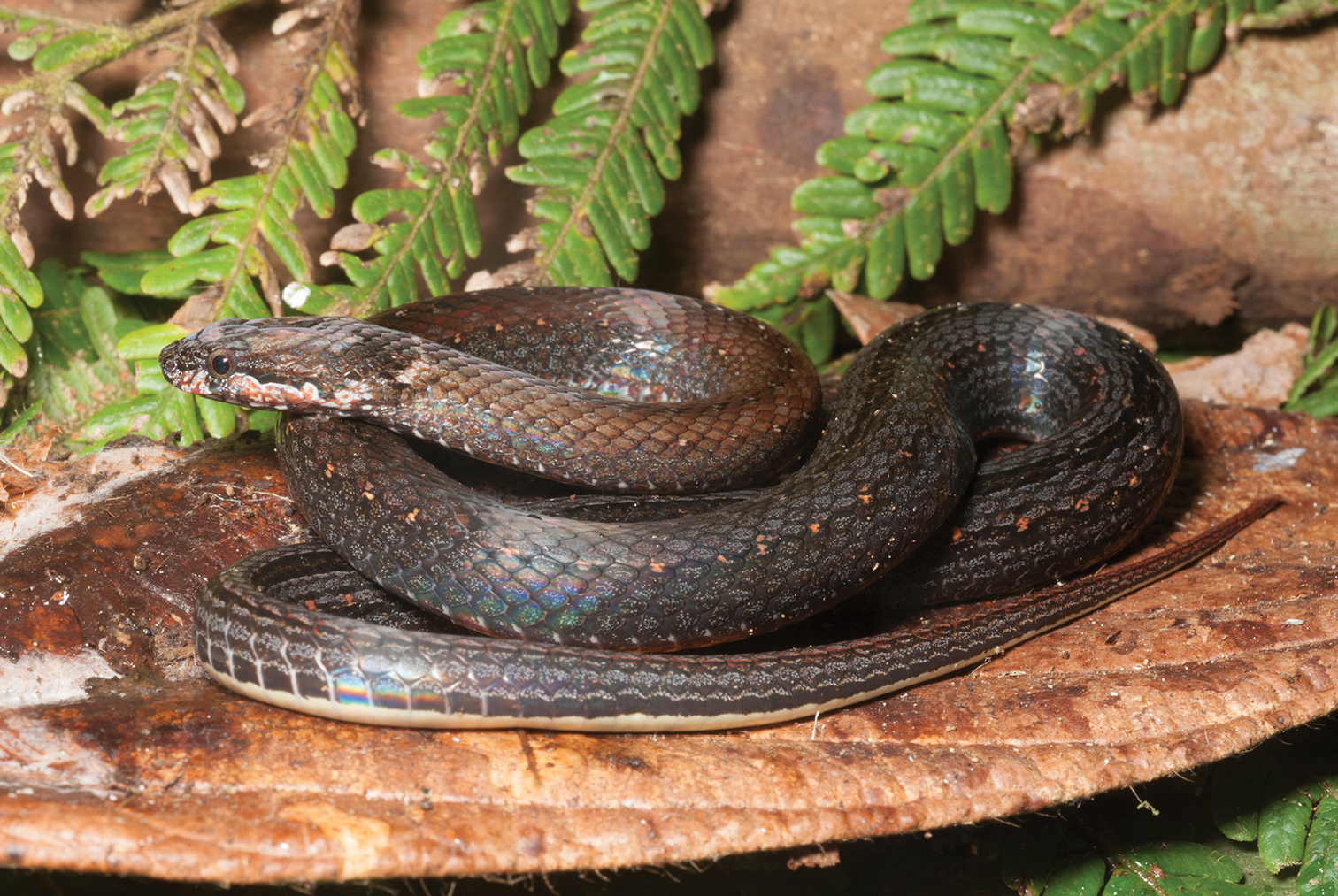

Conservation status
- Least Concern (IUCN 3.1)

Scientific classification
- Kingdom: Animalia
- Phylum: Chordata
- Class: Reptilia
- Order: Squamata
- Suborder: Serpentes
- Family: Cyclocoridae
- Genus: Cyclocorus
- Species: C. nuchalis

Binomial name
- Cyclocorus nuchalis Taylor, 1923
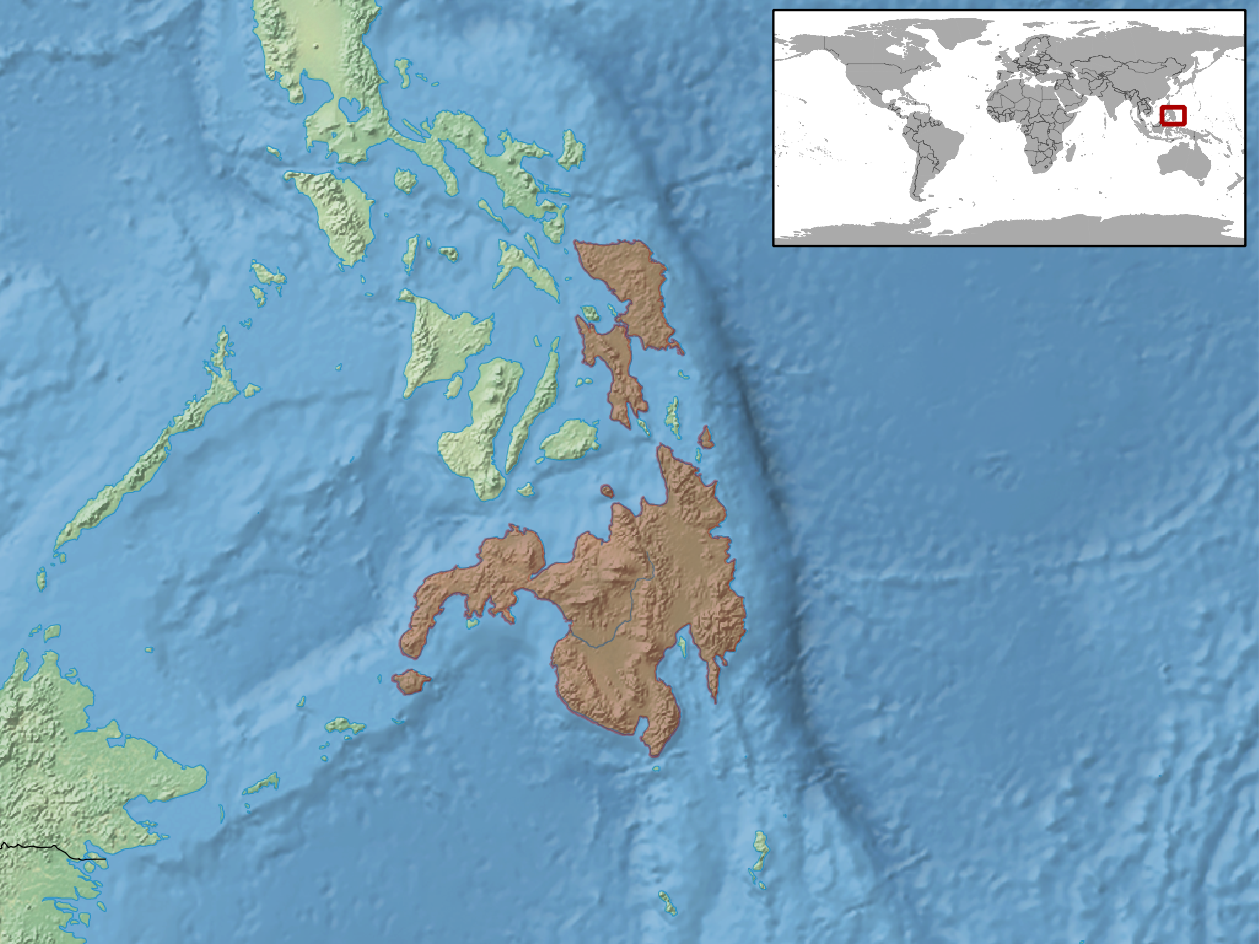

= Cyclocorus nuchalis =

Species of snake

Cyclocorus nuchalis, commonly known as the southern triangle-spotted snake, is a species of snake in the family Cyclocoridae. It is native to southern Philippines.

The species contains two subspecies:

- Cyclocorus nuchalis nuchalis
- Cyclocorus nuchalis taylori Leviton, 1967
