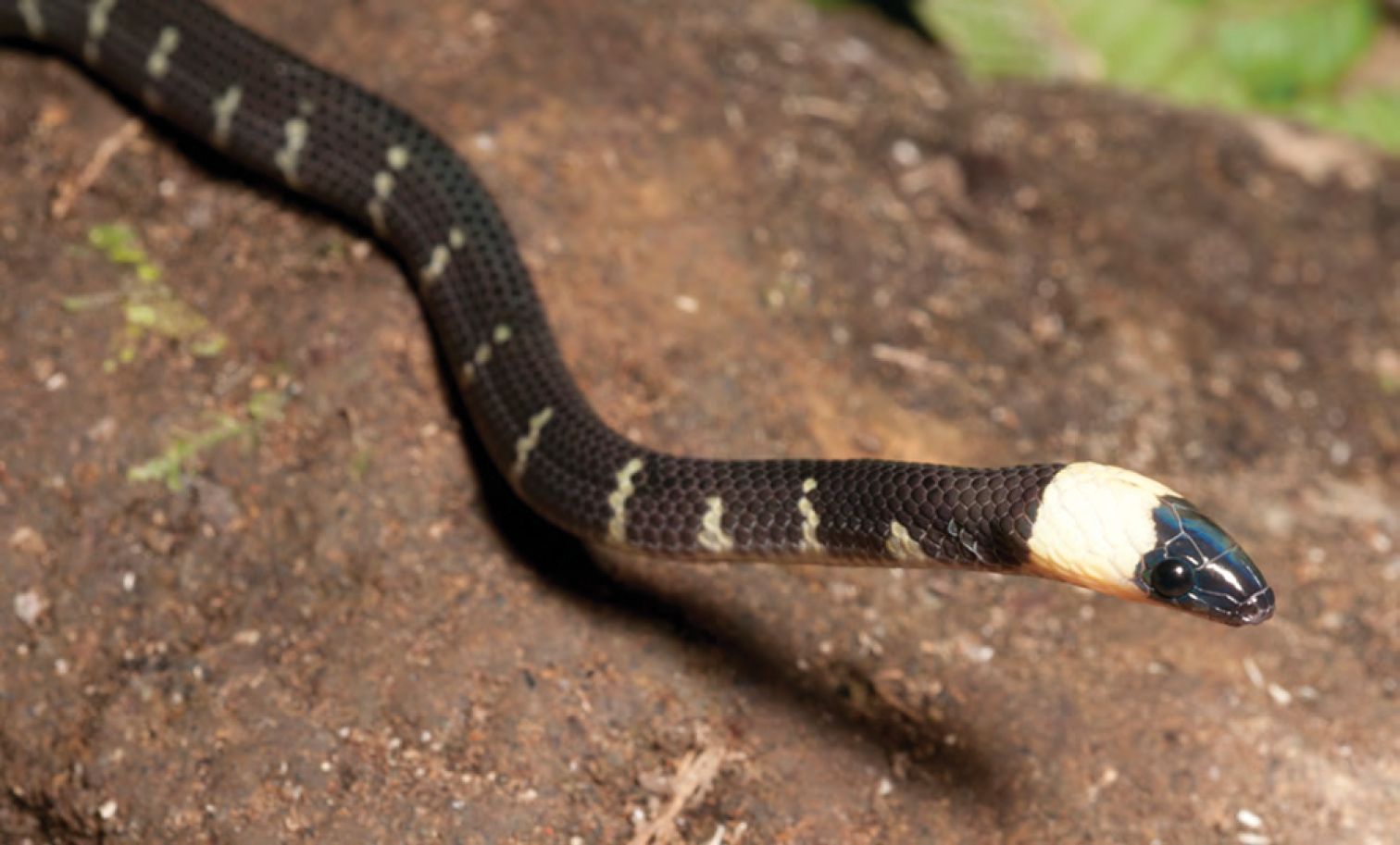
- Oxyrhabdium leporinum

Scientific classification
- Kingdom: Animalia
- Phylum: Chordata
- Class: Reptilia
- Order: Squamata
- Suborder: Serpentes
- Family: Cyclocoridae
- Genus: Oxyrhabdium; Boulenger, 1893

= Oxyrhabdium =

Genus of snakes

Oxyrhabdium is a genus of snakes of the family Cyclocoridae.

== Species ==
- Oxyrhabdium leporinum (Günther, 1858) - Günther's Philippine shrub snake
- Oxyrhabdium modestum (Duméril, 1853) - Philippine shrub snake
