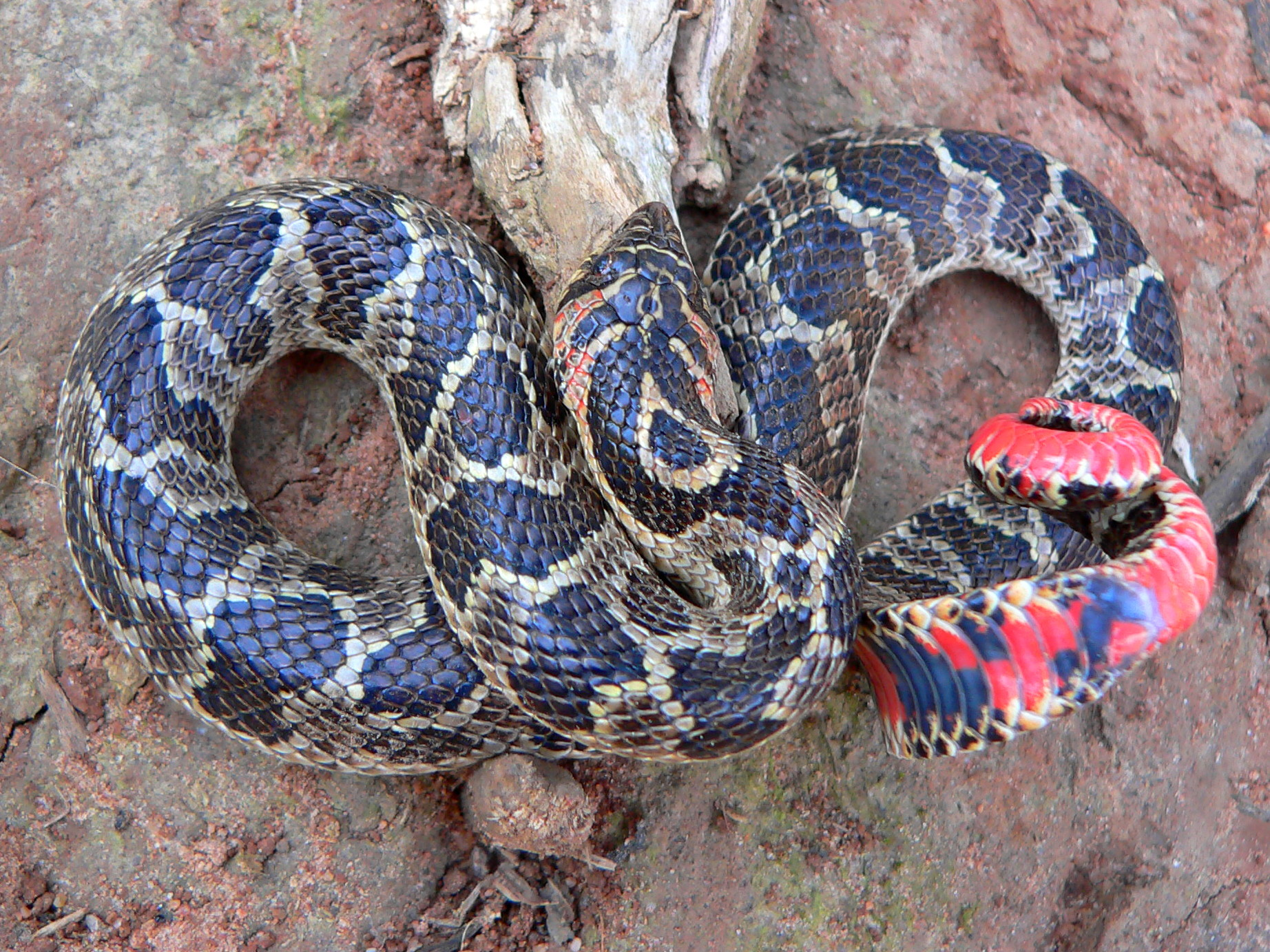
- A xenodontine snake, Xenodon dorbignyi

Scientific classification
- Kingdom: Animalia
- Phylum: Chordata
- Class: Reptilia
- Order: Squamata
- Suborder: Serpentes
- Family: Colubridae
- Subfamily: Xenodontinae; Cope, 1895

= Xenodontinae =

Subfamily of snakes

Xenodontinae is a subfamily of snakes in the family Colubridae.

Xenodontinae are a highly diverse subfamily of snakes, in which many species may look alike, but are actually very different. Their hemipenial morphology serves as a crucial taxonomic tool for distinguishing genera and species.

The subfamily Xenodontinae encompasses a number of rear-fanged (opisthoglyphous), mildly venomous snake genera found in South America and the Caribbean. Members of the subfamily Xenodontinae are by definition closer relatives to the genus Xenodon than they are to the genus Dipsas. Some authors consider Xenodontinae and Dipsadinae to be synonymous. If the two names are used synonymously, then Dipsadinae is the valid name because it is older.

== Genera ==
- Alsophis (includes Dromicus)
- Apostolepis
- Arrhyton
- Boiruna
- Caaeteboia
- Calamodontophis
- Caraiba (formerly Antillophis)
- Clelia
- Conophis
- Ditaxodon Hoge, 1958
- Drepanoides
- Echinanthera
- Elapomorphus
- Erythrolamprus (includes Liophis and Umbrivaga)
- Gomesophis
- Helicops
- Hydrodynastes
- Hydrops
- Hypsirhynchus (includes Darlingtonia)
- Ialtris
- Lygophis
- Magliophis
- Manolepis
- Mussurana
- Oxyrhopus
- Paikwaophis
- Phalotris
- Philodryas (including Pseudablabes)
- Phimophis
- Pseudalsophis
- Pseudoboa Schneider, 1801
- Pseudoeryx
- Pseudotomodon
- Psomophis
- Ptychophis
- Rhachidelus
- Saphenophis
- Siphlophis
- Tachymenis
- Taeniophallus
- Thamnodynastes
- Tomodon
- Tropidodryas
- Uromacer
- Xenodon (includes Lystrophis and Waglerophis)

When used as a subfamily of Dipsadidae, Xenodontinae does not include genera placed in the subfamily Dipsadinae (e.g. Dipsas, Sibon, Coniophanes, Atractus, Geophis, Hypsiglena, Imantodes, Leptodeira, Ninia, Rhadinaea, Urotheca) nor the North American relict genera (Heterodon, Farancia, Diadophis, Carphophis, Contia), nor the Asian genus Thermophis, because these are too distantly-related to Xenodon.
