= Slender snake =

There are three genera of snake named slender snake:

- Tachymenis
- Galvarinus
- Trachischium

In addition, there is a species named slender snake:

- Galvarinus tarmensis
