= Pampas snake =

There are two genera of snake named pampas snake:

- Phimophis
- Rodriguesophis
