= Galvarinus attenuatus =

Conservation status
- Data Deficient (IUCN 3.1)

Scientific classification
- Kingdom: Animalia
- Phylum: Chordata
- Class: Reptilia
- Order: Squamata
- Suborder: Serpentes
- Family: Colubridae
- Genus: Galvarinus
- Species: G. attenuatus

Binomial name
- Galvarinus attenuatus (Walker, 1945)

Synonyms
- Tachymenis attenuata Walker, 1945

Species of snake

Galvarinus attenuatus, also known commonly as Walker's slender snake, is a species of venomous snake in the subfamily Dipsadinae of the family Colubridae. The species is native to western-central South America. There are two recognized subspecies.

== Geographic distribution ==
Galvarinus attenuatus is found in Bolivia and Peru.

== Habitat ==
The preferred natural habitat of Galvarinus attenuatus is forest and grassland, at elevations of 2,500–3,600 m (8,200–11,800 ft).

== Behavior ==
Galvarinus attenuatus is terrestrial.

== Reproduction ==
Galvarinus attenuatus is ovoviviparous.

== Venom ==
Galvarinus attenuatus is venomous.

== Subspecies ==
Two subspecies are recognized as being valid, including the nominotypical subspecies.

- Galvarinus attenuatus attenuatus (Walker, 1945)
- Galvarinus attenuatus bolivianus (Walker, 1945)

Nota bene: A trinomial authority in parentheses indicates that the subspecies was originally described in a genus other than Galvarinus.
