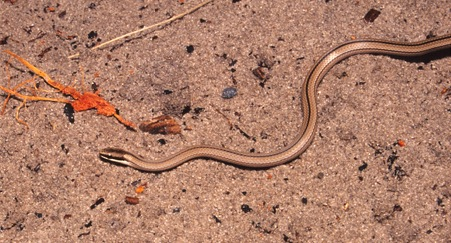

Conservation status
- Least Concern (IUCN 3.1)

Scientific classification
- Kingdom: Animalia
- Phylum: Chordata
- Class: Reptilia
- Order: Squamata
- Suborder: Serpentes
- Family: Colubridae
- Genus: Psomophis
- Species: P. joberti

Binomial name
- Psomophis joberti (Sauvage, 1884)

Synonyms
- Enicognathus joberti Sauvage, 1884; Liophis joberti — Hoge, 1958; Psomophis joberti — Myers & Cadle, 1994

= Psomophis joberti =

Species of snake

Psomophis joberti, also known commonly as Jobert's ground snake and cobra-corredeira in Brazilian Portuguese, is a species of snake in the subfamily Dipsadinae of the family Colubridae. The species is native to eastern South America.

== Etymology ==
The specific name, joberti, is in honor of French zoologist C. Jobert who collected natural history specimens in Brazil.

== Geographic range ==
P. joberti is found in eastern Brazil, and may also occur in extreme eastern Bolivia.

== Habitat ==
The preferred natural habitats of P. joberti are grassland and savanna with sandy soils.

== Behavior ==
P. joberti is diurnal and terrestrial.

== Reproduction ==
P. joberti is oviparous.
