= Psomophis genimaculatus =

Conservation status
- Least Concern (IUCN 3.1)

Scientific classification
- Kingdom: Animalia
- Phylum: Chordata
- Class: Reptilia
- Order: Squamata
- Suborder: Serpentes
- Family: Colubridae
- Genus: Psomophis
- Species: P. genimaculatus

Binomial name
- Psomophis genimaculatus (Boettger, 1885)

Species of snake

Psomophis genimaculatus, also known commonly as the spirit diminutive snake, the spirit ground snake, and cobra-cabelo in Brazilian Portuguese, is a species of snake in the subfamily Dipsadinae of the family Colubridae. The species is endemic to South America.

== Geographic range ==
P. genimaculatus is found in Argentina, Bolivia, Brazil, and Paraguay.
