= Psomophis obtusus =

Conservation status
- Least Concern (IUCN 3.1)

Scientific classification
- Kingdom: Animalia
- Phylum: Chordata
- Class: Reptilia
- Order: Squamata
- Suborder: Serpentes
- Family: Colubridae
- Genus: Psomophis
- Species: P. obtusus

Binomial name
- Psomophis obtusus (Cope, 1863)

Species of snake

Psomophis obtusus, also known commonly as the wide ground snake and corredeira-do-banhado in Brazilian Portuguese, is a species of snake in the subfamily Dipsadinae of the family Colubridae. The species is endemic to South America.

== Geographic range ==
P. obtusus is found in Argentina, Brazil, Paraguay, and Uruguay.
