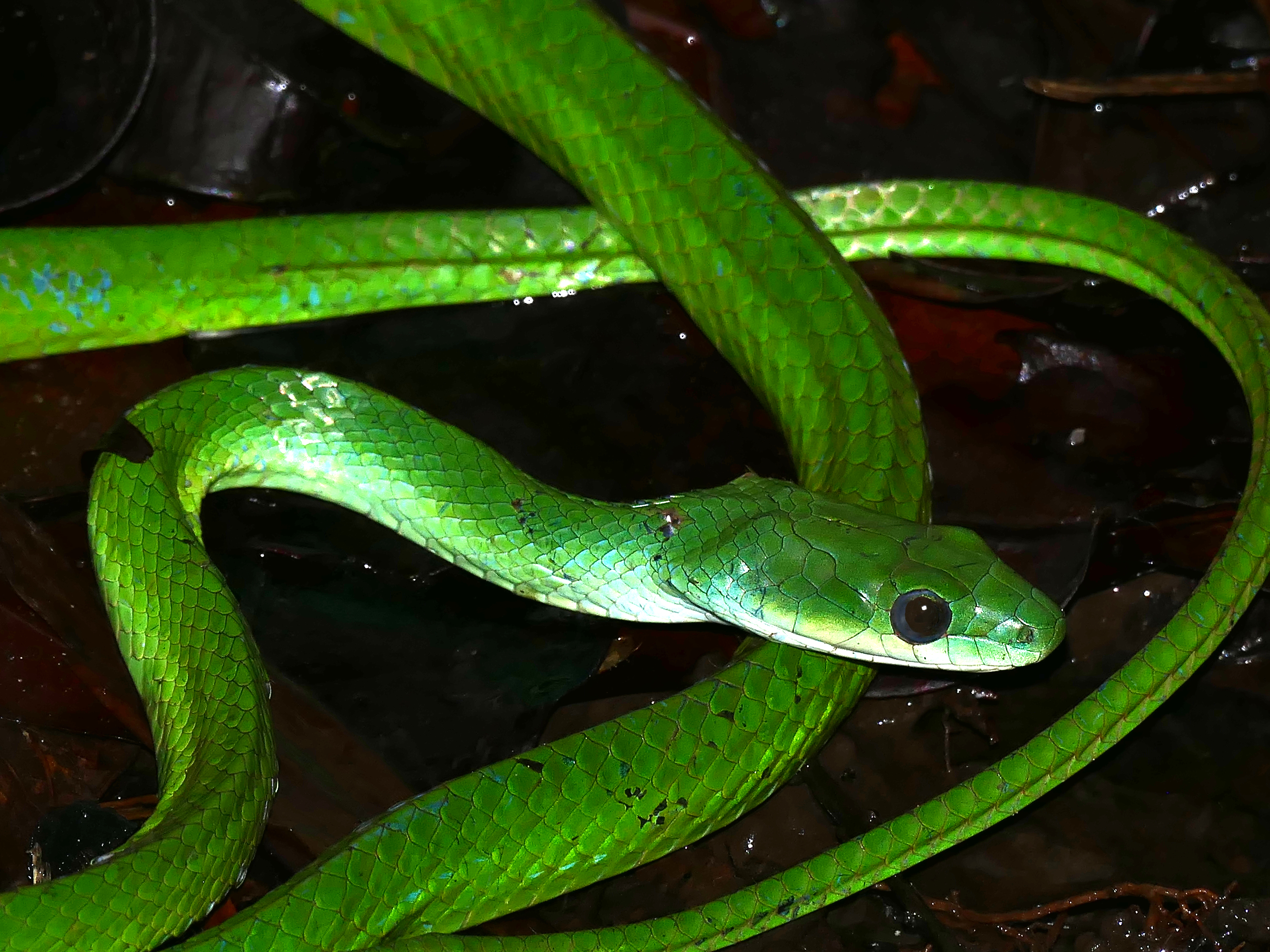
- Common green racer, Chlorosoma viridissimum

Scientific classification
- Domain: Eukaryota
- Kingdom: Animalia
- Phylum: Chordata
- Class: Reptilia
- Order: Squamata
- Suborder: Serpentes
- Family: Colubridae
- Subfamily: Dipsadinae
- Genus: Chlorosoma; Wagler, 1830

= Chlorosoma =

Genus of snakes

Chlorosoma is a genus of snakes of the subfamily Dipsadinae.

== Species ==
- Chlorosoma dunupyana (Melo-Sampaio, Passos, Martins, Jennings, Moura-Leite, Morato, Venegas, Chávez, Venâncio, & De Souza, 2020)
- Chlorosoma laticeps F. Werner, 1900 – Bolivia, Brazil
- Chlorosoma viridissimum (Linnaeus, 1758) – N South America in Amazon and Paraguay River basins
