= Rodriguesophis iglesiasi =

Conservation status
- Least Concern (IUCN 3.1)

Scientific classification
- Kingdom: Animalia
- Phylum: Chordata
- Class: Reptilia
- Order: Squamata
- Suborder: Serpentes
- Family: Colubridae
- Genus: Rodriguesophis
- Species: R. iglesiasi

Binomial name
- Rodriguesophis iglesiasi (Gomes, 1915)

Synonyms
- Rhinostoma iglesiasi Gomes, 1915; Rhinostoma bimaculatum A. Lutz & Mello, 1922; Phimophis iglesiasi — Bailey, 1967; Rodriguesophis iglesiasi — Grazziotin et al., 2012

Species of snake

Rodriguesophis iglesiasi, also known commonly as Gomes' pampas snake or Gomes's pampas snake, is a species of snake in the subfamily Dipsadinae of the family Colubridae. The species is endemic to Brazil.

== Etymology ==
The specific name, iglesias, is in honor of Brazilian zoologist Francisco Iglesias.

== Geographic range ==
R. iglesiasi is found in the Brazilian states of Bahia, Goiás, Maranhão, Minas Gerais, Pernambuco, Piauí, and Tocantins.

== Habitat ==
The preferred natural habitats of R. iglesiasi are grassland, shrubland, and savanna.

== Description ==
A small snake, R. iglesiasi may attain a total length (including tail) of 51.7 cm (20.4 in).

Dorsally, it is reddish with a black nuchal blotch. Ventrally, it is pinkish white. The rostral is spatulate, but not upturned. The iris of the eye is black.

== Behavior ==
R. iglesiasi is terrestrial.

== Diet ==
R. iglesiasi preys predominately upon lizards.

== Reproduction ==
R. iglesiasi is oviparous. Clutch size is small, usually only two eggs.
