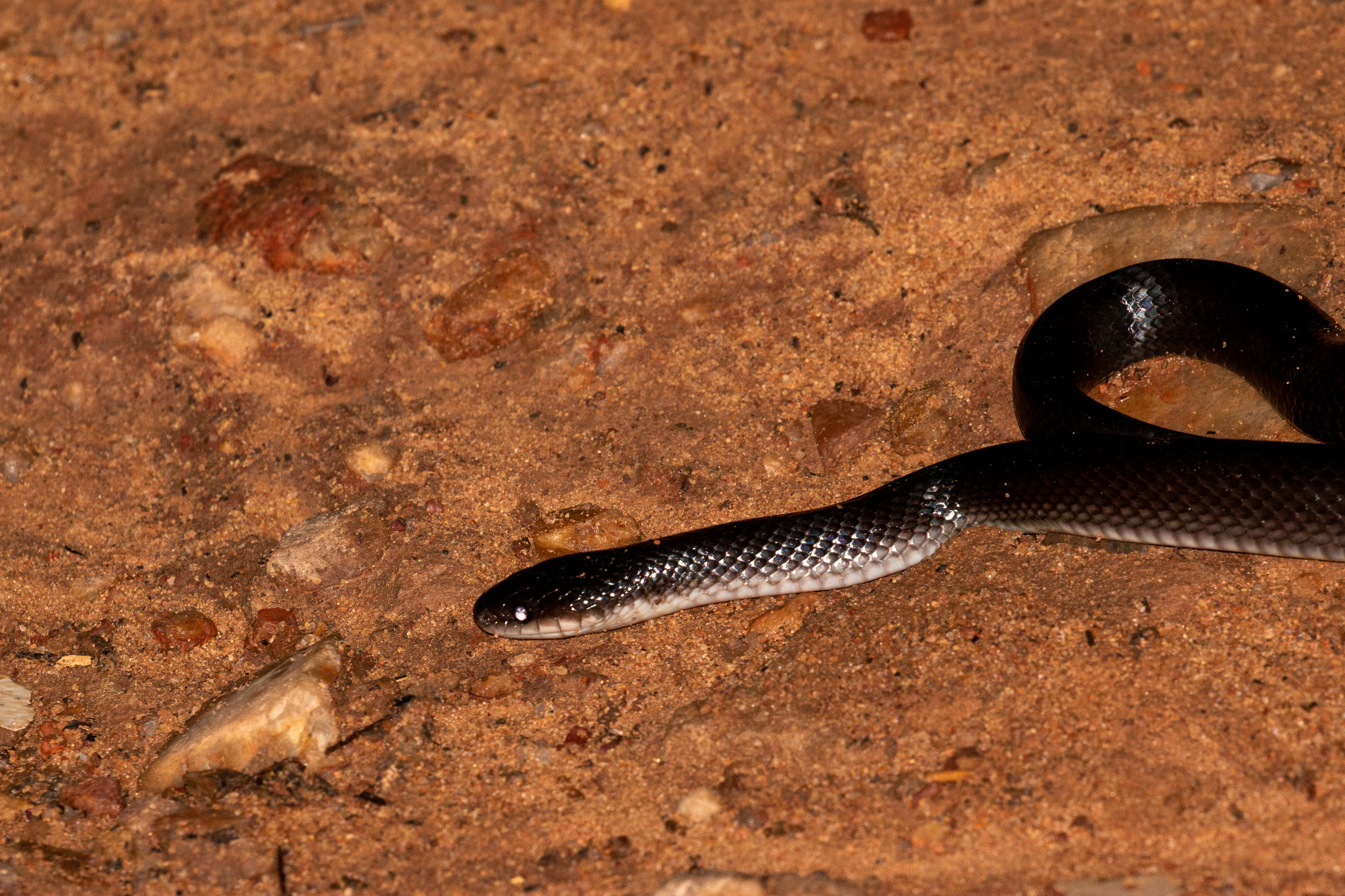

Conservation status
- Least Concern (IUCN 3.1)

Scientific classification
- Kingdom: Animalia
- Phylum: Chordata
- Class: Reptilia
- Order: Squamata
- Suborder: Serpentes
- Family: Colubridae
- Genus: Boiruna
- Species: B. sertaneja

Binomial name
- Boiruna sertaneja Zaher, 1996

= Boiruna sertaneja =

Species of snake

Boiruna sertaneja, also known commonly as a mussurana (along with several other snakes), is a species of snake in the subfamily Dipsadinae of the family Colubridae. The species is endemic to Brazil.

== Description ==
A medium to large snake, B. sertaneja may attain a snout-to-vent length (SVL) of 2.35 m (7.7 ft).

== Habitat ==
The preferred natural habitats of B. sertaneja are savanna and shrubland.

== Diet ==
B. sertaneja preys predominately upon snakes, but may also eat lizards.

== Reproduction ==
B. sertaneja is oviparous. Females reach sexual maturity at a total length (including tail) of about 1.3 m (4.3 ft). Clutch size is 4–14 eggs.
