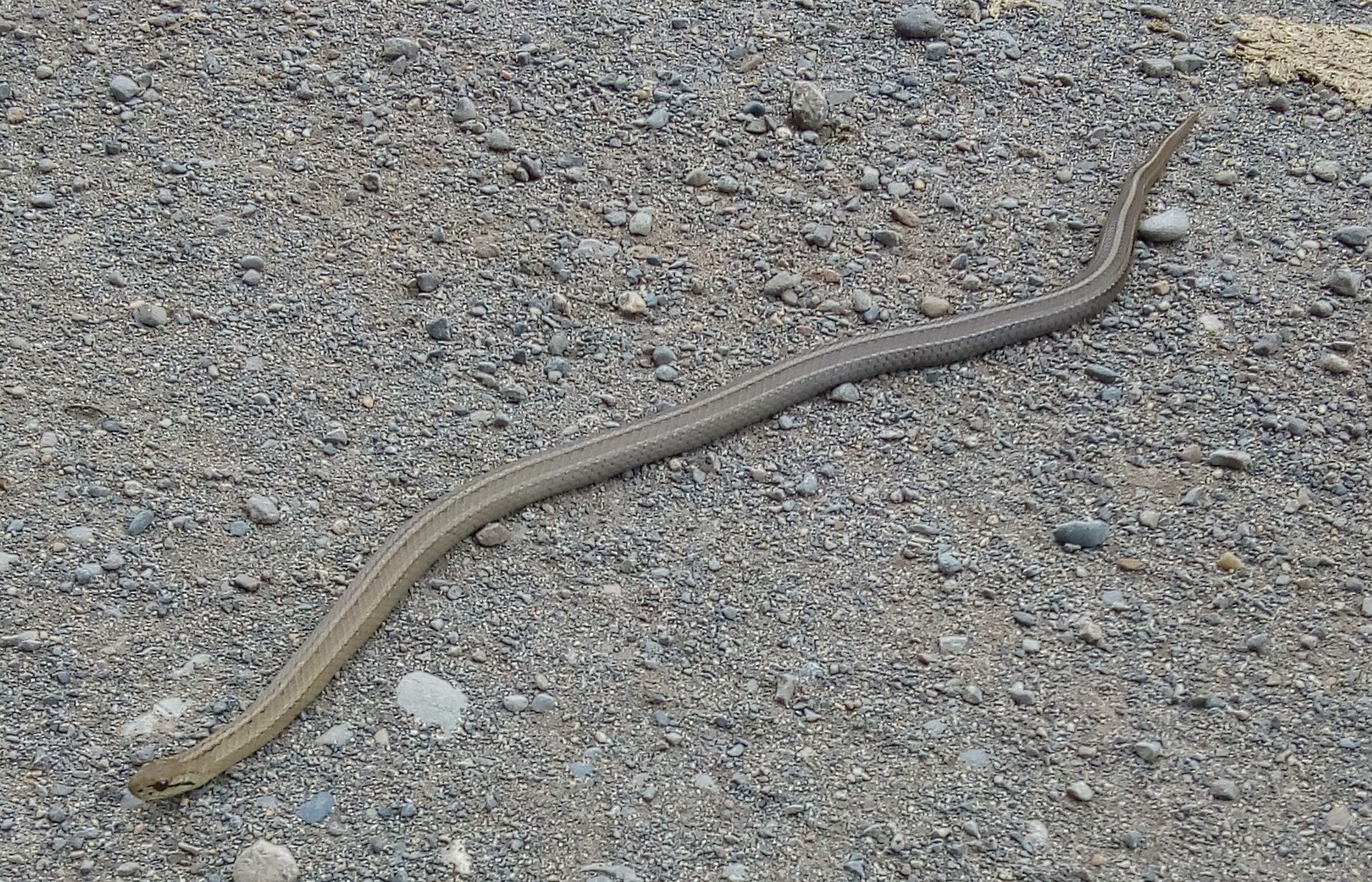

Conservation status
- Near Threatened (IUCN 3.1)

Scientific classification
- Kingdom: Animalia
- Phylum: Chordata
- Class: Reptilia
- Order: Squamata
- Suborder: Serpentes
- Family: Colubridae
- Genus: Galvarinus
- Species: G. chilensis

Binomial name
- Galvarinus chilensis (Schlegel, 1837)

Synonyms
- Coronella chilensis Schlegel 1837; Dipsas chilensis (Schlegel, 1837); Mesotes chilensis (Schlegel, 1837); Tachymenis chilensis (Schlegel, 1837); Psammophylax assimilis Jan, 1866; Tachymenis peruviana var. coronellina F. Werner, 1898: 259; Tachymenis peruviana var. catenata F. Werner, 1898; Tachymenis chilensis coronellina F. Werner, 1898

= Galvarinus chilensis =

Species of snake

Galvarinus chilensis, commonly known as the Chilean slender snake, is a species of venomous snake belonging to the subfamily Dipsadinae of the family Colubridae. The species is native to southern South America. There are two recognized subspecies.

== Taxonomy ==
Galvarinus chilensis was first formally described as Coronella chilensis in 1837 by the German ornithologist, herpetologist and ichthyologist Hermann Schlegel, with its type locality given as Chile. In 1854, Charles Frédéric Girard reclassified C. chilensis into the genus Tachymenis, and in 2022, Trevine et al. proposed the new genus Galvarinus for the T. chilensis species group, the trans-Andean clade within Tachymenis, and Tachmymenis chilensis was designated as the type species of the new genus. The genus Galvarinus is classified within the tribe Tachymenini of the subfamily Dipsadinae in the family Colubridae.

=== Subspecies ===
Two subspecies of Galvarinus chilensis are recognized as being valid, including the nominotypical subspecies.

- Galvarinus chilensis chilensis (Schlegel, 1837) – Talca south to 44°S
- Galvarinus chilensis coronellinus (Werner, 1898) – Copiapo south to Talca

== Etymology ==
Galvarinus chilensis is the type species of the genus Galvarinus, a name that is derived from the famous Mapuche warrior Galvarino, who fought against the Spanish in the 16th century. The specific name, chilensis, refers to the type locality, Chile.

== Description ==
Galvarinus chilensis is a medium-sized snake. Maximum total length (tail included) is 41 cm (16 in), with a pointed head which is not clearly defined from the neck. It has a vertical pupil in its eye, and the snout is rounded. The back is rufous-grey or brownish, with a pale grey stripe with black margins down the spine. The head is grey brown with three dark streaks radiating from the eye. The underside is grey with black edges.

== Geographic distribution and habitat ==
Galvarinus chilensis is mostly found in Chile, where its range extends from the Atacama Desert south to Chiloé Island; it also occurs in the Argentine provinces of Neuquén, Chubut, and Río Negro. This species occurs from sea level to 2,800 m (9,200 ft) in deserts, Mediterranean and temperate scrub, forests, puna grassland and temperate forests.

== Biology ==
Galvarinus chilensis is an ovoviviparous snake. It preys predominately upon frogs and lizards. It is a rear-fanged (opisthoglyphous) venomous species which has a proteolytic-hemolytic venom.
