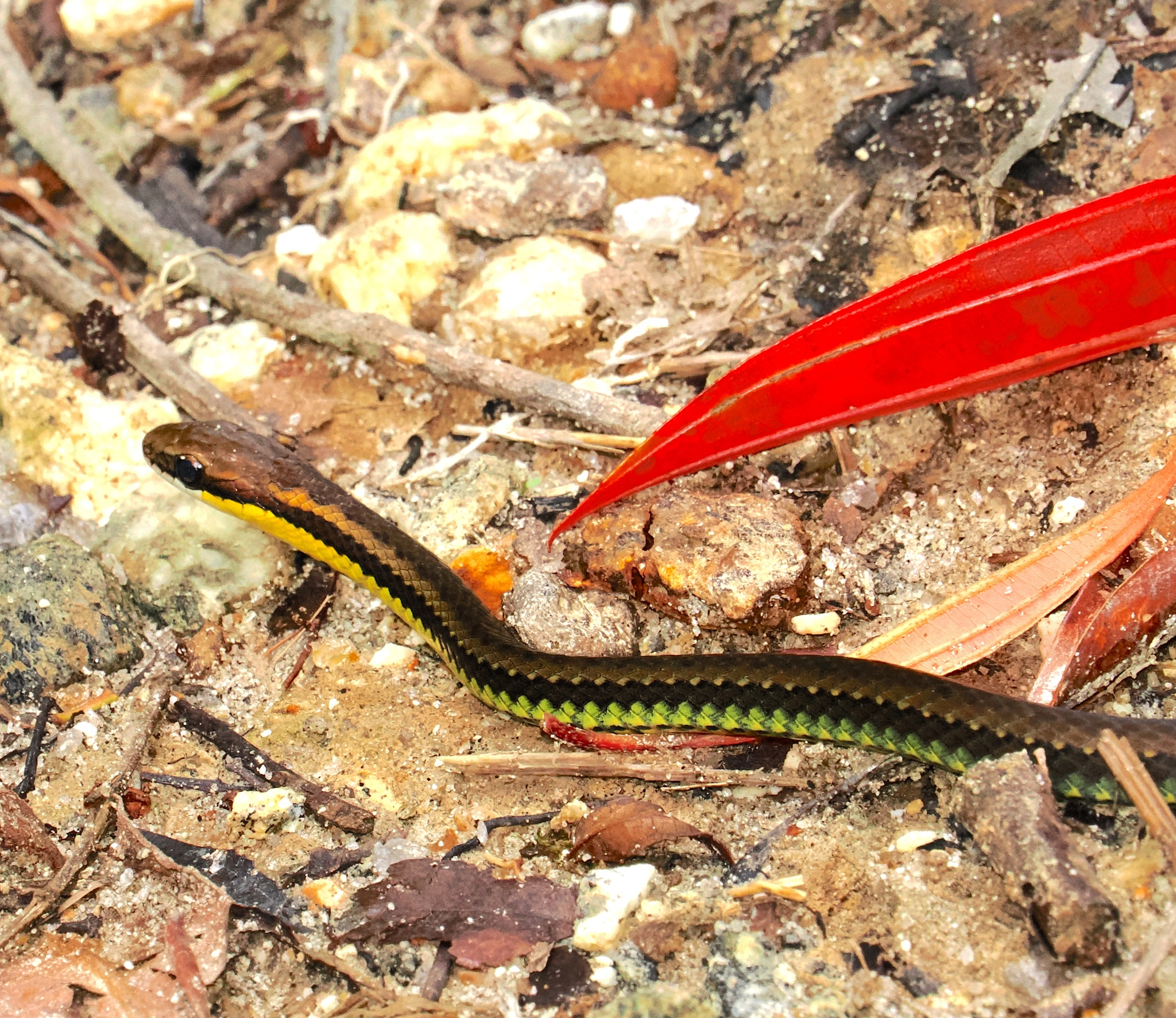

Conservation status
- Least Concern (IUCN 3.1)

Scientific classification
- Kingdom: Animalia
- Phylum: Chordata
- Class: Reptilia
- Order: Squamata
- Suborder: Serpentes
- Family: Colubridae
- Genus: Echinanthera
- Species: E. cephalostriata

Binomial name
- Echinanthera cephalostriata Di Bernardo, 1996

= Echinanthera cephalostriata =

Species of snake

Echinanthera cephalostriata is a species of snake of the family Colubridae in the subfamily Dipsadinae. The species is endemic to Brazil. Echinanthera cephalostriata is a species in the family Colubridae, common name "Head-striped Leaf-litter Snake". They're a slender, small to medium length snake, with a blotched pattern along their back and a thick black stripe down the sides. They're usually seen in colors of brown and grey, and have a bright yellow venter, with characteristically big eyes and a small head. They're non-venomous, and prey mainly upon amphibians. They are diurnal and might be spotted near creeks. They range from the Brazilian states of Santa Catarina, Paraná, São Paulo, Gerais, Rio de Janeiro, and Espírito Santo. Little information has been recorded on this species.
