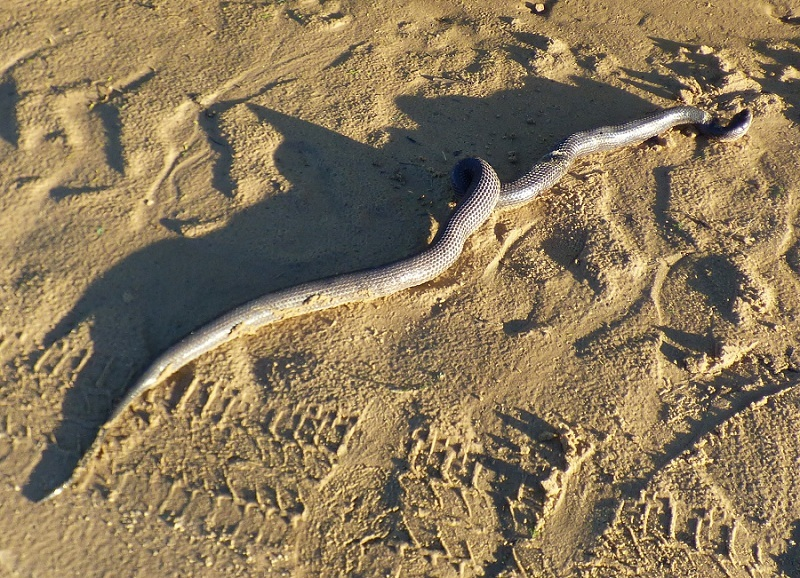

Conservation status
- Least Concern (IUCN 3.1)

Scientific classification
- Kingdom: Animalia
- Phylum: Chordata
- Class: Reptilia
- Order: Squamata
- Suborder: Serpentes
- Family: Colubridae
- Genus: Boiruna
- Species: B. maculata

Binomial name
- Boiruna maculata (Boulenger, 1896)

Synonyms
- Oxyrhopus maculatus Boulenger, 1896

= Boiruna maculata =

Species of snake

Boiruna maculata, also known commonly as a mussurana (along with several other snakes), is a species of snake in the subfamily Dipsadinae of the family Colubridae. The species is native to South America.

== Description ==
B. maculata has smooth dorsal scales. Adults are uniformly black, both dorsally and ventrally. Juveniles are black dorsally, and red ventrally, with a red nuchal collar.

== Geographic range ==
B. maculata can be found in Argentina, Bolivia, Brazil, Paraguay, and Uruguay.

== Habitat ==
B. maculata is found in a variety of habitats including forest, savanna, shrubland, and desert.

== Behavior ==
B. maculata is terrestrial.

== Diet ==
B. maculata preys predominately upon snakes, but also upon fishes, lizards, birds, and small mammals.

== Reproduction ==
B. maculata is oviparous.

== Venom ==
B. maculata is rear-fanged (opisthoglyphous), and it possesses a venom which is potentially dangerous to humans, especially children.
