= Amaral's ground snake =

Conservation status
- Least Concern (IUCN 3.1)

Scientific classification
- Kingdom: Animalia
- Phylum: Chordata
- Class: Reptilia
- Order: Squamata
- Suborder: Serpentes
- Family: Colubridae
- Genus: Caaeteboia
- Species: C. amarali

Binomial name
- Caaeteboia amarali (Wettstein, 1930)

Synonyms
- Liophis amarali Wettstein, 1930; Caaeteboia amarali — Zaher et al., 2009

Species of snake

Amaral's ground snake (Caaeteboia amarali) is a species of snake in the family Colubridae. The species is endemic to Brazil.

== Etymology ==
The specific name, amarali, is in honor of Brazilian herpetologist Afrânio Pompílio Gastos do Amaral.

== Geographic range ==
C. amarali is found in eastern Brazil, in the Brazilian states of Bahia, Espírito Santo, Minas Gerais, Paraná, Rio de Janeiro, and Santa Catarina.

== Description ==
C. amarali is a small-sized, aglyphous, slender snake with a moderately long tail.

== Behavior ==
C. amarali is diurnal, partly arboreal, and exhibits dorsal flattening and cloacal evacuation as defensive behaviors (Marques et al. 2001).

== Diet ==
The diet of C. amarali consists of frogs and lizards.

== Reproduction ==
C. amarali is oviparous.
