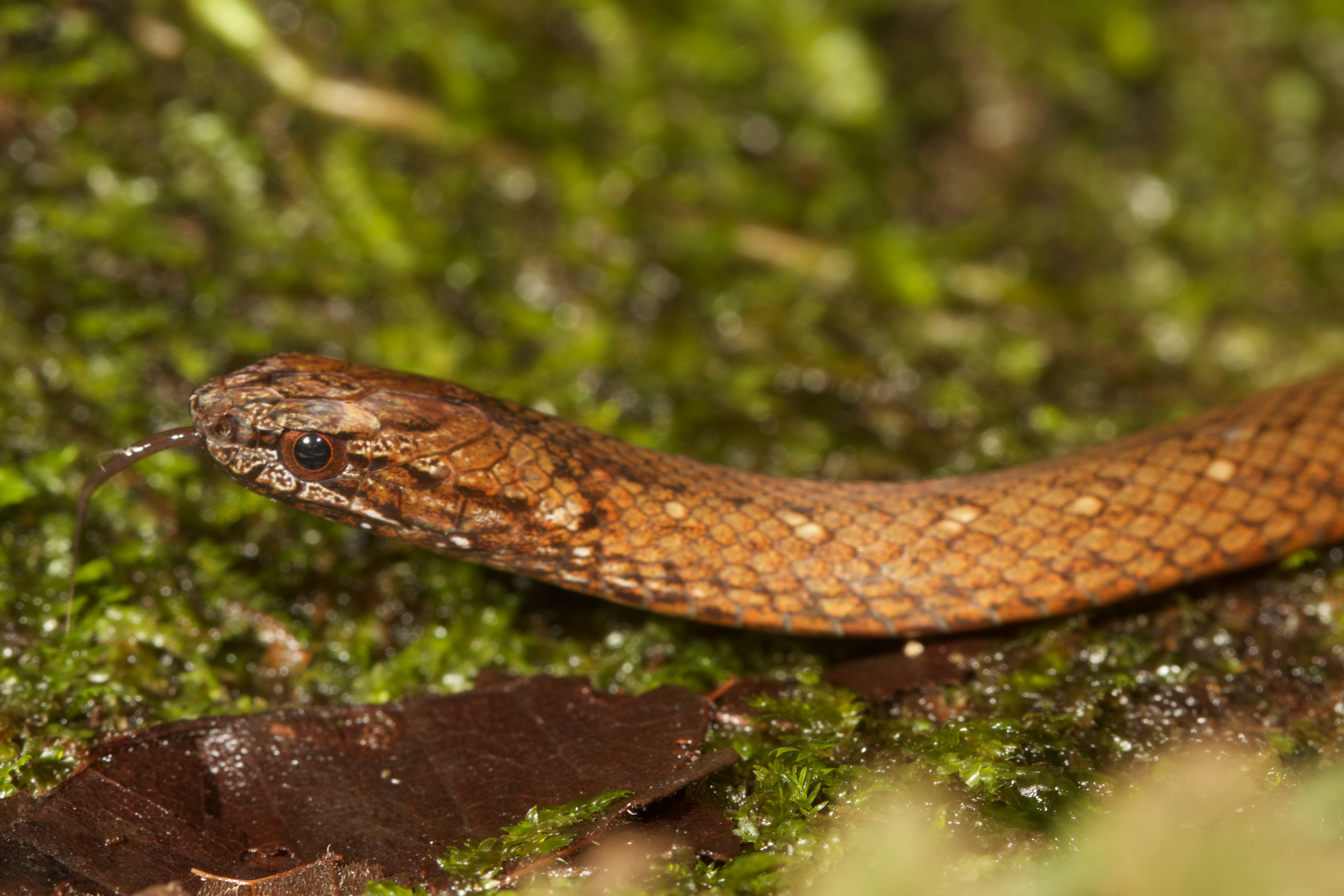

Conservation status
- Least Concern (IUCN 3.1)

Scientific classification
- Kingdom: Animalia
- Phylum: Chordata
- Class: Reptilia
- Order: Squamata
- Suborder: Serpentes
- Family: Colubridae
- Genus: Amastridium
- Species: A. veliferum

Binomial name
- Amastridium veliferum Cope, 1860

Synonyms
- Amastridium veliferum Cope, 1860; Fleischmannia obscura Boettger, 1898; Phrydrops melas Boulenger, 1905; Phydrops [sic] melas — Dunn, 1931; Amastridium veliferum — J. Peters & Orejas-Miranda, 1970; Amastridium veliferum — Wallach et al., 2014

= Rustyhead snake =

Species of snake

The rustyhead snake (Amastridium veliferum), also known commonly as the rufous-headed snake, is a species of snake in the family Colubridae. The species is endemic to Central America and Colombia.

== Taxonomy ==
Amastridium veliferum is one of only two recognized species in the genus Amastridium.

== Geographic range ==
Amastridium veliferum is found in Colombia, Costa Rica, Guatemala, Nicaragua, and Panama.

== Habitat ==
The preferred natural habitat of A. veliferum is forest, at altitudes of 2–1,200 m (6.6–3,937.0 ft).

== Reproduction ==
Amastridium veliferum is oviparous.
