= Magliophis exiguus =

Conservation status
- Least Concern (IUCN 3.1)

Scientific classification
- Kingdom: Animalia
- Phylum: Chordata
- Class: Reptilia
- Order: Squamata
- Suborder: Serpentes
- Family: Colubridae
- Genus: Magliophis
- Species: M. exiguus

Binomial name
- Magliophis exiguus (Cope, 1862)

Species of snake

Magliophis exiguus, the Virgin Islands miniracer or ground snake, is a species of snake in the family Colubridae. The species is native to the United States Virgin Islands and British Virgin Islands.
