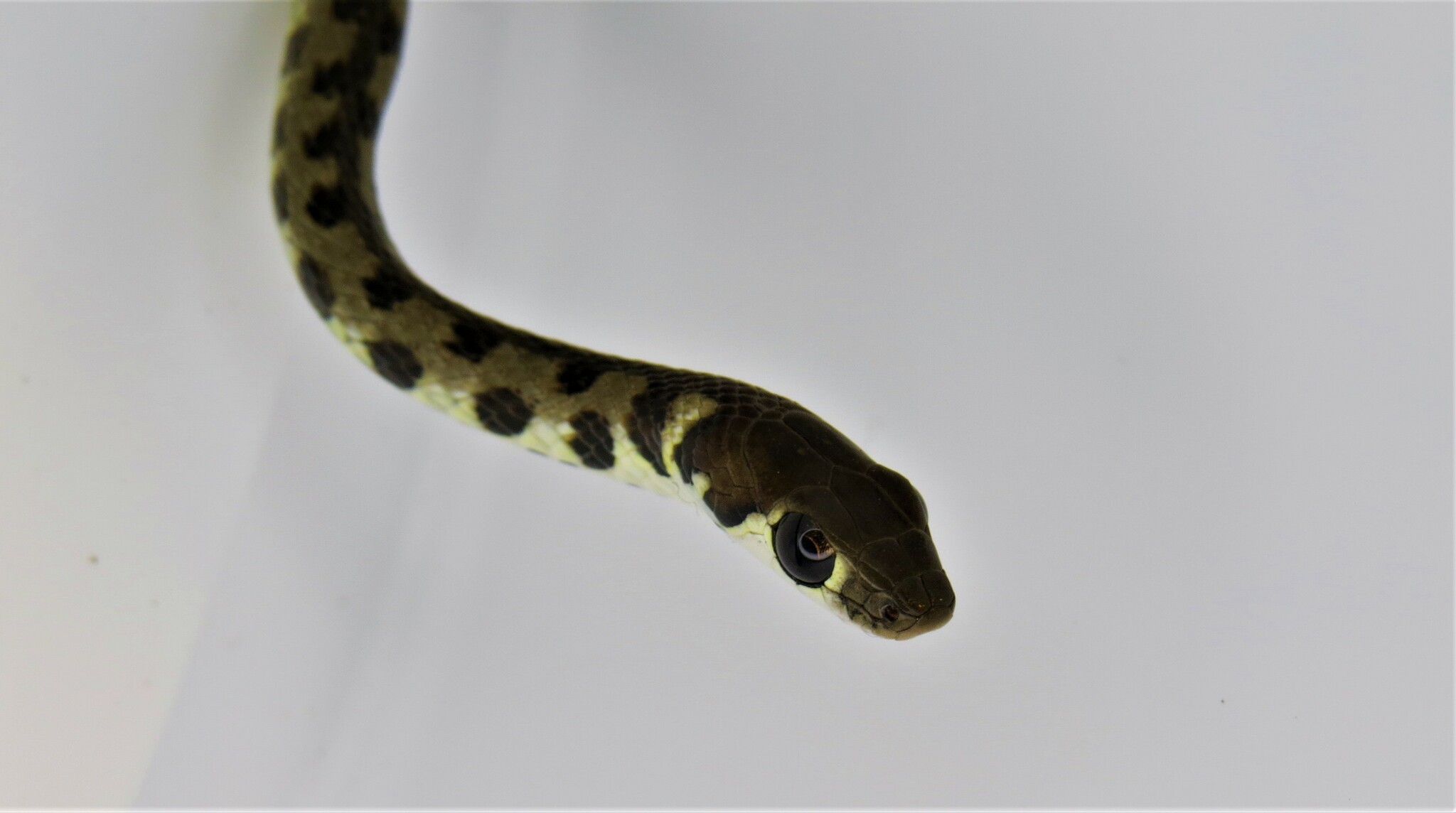

Conservation status
- Critically Endangered (IUCN 3.1)

Scientific classification
- Kingdom: Animalia
- Phylum: Chordata
- Class: Reptilia
- Order: Squamata
- Suborder: Serpentes
- Family: Colubridae
- Genus: Echinanthera
- Species: E. cephalomaculata

Binomial name
- Echinanthera cephalomaculata Di Bernardo, 1994

= Echinanthera cephalomaculata =

Species of snake

Echinanthera cephalomaculata is a species of snake in the family Colubridae. The holotype (a female) measured 561 mm (22.1 in).

== Distribution ==
The species is endemic to north-eastern Brazil.
