= Dibernardia =

Scientific classification
- Kingdom: Animalia
- Phylum: Chordata
- Class: Reptilia
- Order: Squamata
- Suborder: Serpentes
- Family: Colubridae
- Subfamily: Dipsadinae
- Genus: Dibernardia; Myers, 1974

Genus of snakes

Dibernardia is a genus of snakes of the family Colubridae.

== Species ==
- Dibernardia affinis (Günther, 1858)
- Dibernardia bilineata (Fischer, 1885)
- Dibernardia persimilis (Cope, 1869)
- Dibernardia poecilopogon (Cope, 1863)
