= Galvarinus tarmensis =

Conservation status
- Data Deficient (IUCN 3.1)

Scientific classification
- Kingdom: Animalia
- Phylum: Chordata
- Class: Reptilia
- Order: Squamata
- Suborder: Serpentes
- Family: Colubridae
- Genus: Galvarinus
- Species: G. tarmensis

Binomial name
- Galvarinus tarmensis (Walker, 1945)

Synonyms
- Tachymenis tarmensis Walker, 1945

Species of snake

Galvarinus tarmensis, also known commonly as the slender snake, is a species of venomous snake in the subfamily Dipsadinae of the family Colubridae. The species is endemic to Peru.

== Geographic distribution ==
Galvarinus tarmensis is found in the central highlands of Peru, in Junín region.

== Habitat ==
The preferred natural habitats of Galvarinus tarmensis are forest and shrubland, at elevations around 3,200 m (10,500 ft).

== Behavior ==
Galvarinus tarmensis is terrestrial.

== Reproduction ==
Galvarinus tarmensis is ovoviviparous.
