= Taeniophallus brevirostris =

Conservation status
- Least Concern (IUCN 3.1)

Scientific classification
- Kingdom: Animalia
- Phylum: Chordata
- Class: Reptilia
- Order: Squamata
- Suborder: Serpentes
- Family: Colubridae
- Genus: Taeniophallus
- Species: T. brevirostris

Binomial name
- Taeniophallus brevirostris (Peters, 1863)

Species of snake

Taeniophallus brevirostris, also known as the short-nosed ground snake, is a species of snake in the family, Colubridae. It is found in Brazil, Bolivia, Suriname, French Guiana, Colombia, and Peru.
