= Common green racer =

There are two species of snake named common green racer:

- Chlorosoma viridissimum
- Philodryas aestiva
