= Dibernardia affinis =

Conservation status
- Least Concern (IUCN 3.1)

Scientific classification
- Kingdom: Animalia
- Phylum: Chordata
- Class: Reptilia
- Order: Squamata
- Suborder: Serpentes
- Family: Colubridae
- Genus: Dibernardia
- Species: D. affinis

Binomial name
- Dibernardia affinis (Günther, 1858)

Species of snake

Dibernardia affinis is a species of snake in the family Colubridae. The species is native to Brazil.
