= Paikwaophis =

Scientific classification
- Kingdom: Animalia
- Phylum: Chordata
- Class: Reptilia
- Order: Squamata
- Suborder: Serpentes
- Family: Colubridae
- Subfamily: Xenodontinae
- Genus: Paikwaophis; Kok and Means, 2023
- Species: P. kruki

Binomial name
- Paikwaophis kruki Kok and Means, 2023

Genus of snake

Paikwaophis is a monotypic genus of snake in the subfamily Xenodontinae (family Dipsadidae), represented solely by the species Paikwaophis kruki. It is known only from the type locality in the Eastern Pantepui District of the Guiana Shield highlands in Guyana.

== Taxonomy ==
Paikwaophis was described in 2023 based on morphological and molecular data. Phylogenetic analyses using six genes (four mitochondrial and two nuclear) placed the genus as sister to Xenopholis, with strong statistical support. While both genera are nested within Xenodontinae, they differ significantly in morphology and osteology. Due to the distinctiveness of Paikwaophis, a new genus was erected.

The genus name combines the name of the Paikwa River with the Greek ophis (snake). The type species, Paikwaophis kruki, is named in honor of Polish biologist Andrzej Kruk.

== Description ==
Paikwaophis kruki is a small, non-venomous snake characterized by a short head, robust body, and smooth scales arranged in 17 dorsal rows without reduction. The tail is short, comprising about 13% of the total length. Coloration includes a light brown dorsum, bold black lateral stripes, and a light blue streak along the lower sides.

The skull and vertebrae suggest a fossorial or semi-fossorial lifestyle, with features such as a blunt snout, reduced postorbital bone, smooth neural spines, and absence of hypapophyses on the posterior vertebrae. The species has a distinctive dental pattern, including seven prediastemal and two postdiastemal maxillary teeth, as well as additional teeth on the palatine, pterygoid, and dentary bones.

Although phylogenetically closest to Xenopholis, Paikwaophis differs in several ways, including a higher number of trunk vertebrae, absence of grooved fangs, a larger and vertically ovoid lacrimal foramen, and a distinct structure of the postorbital bone.

== Distribution and habitat ==
Paikwaophis kruki is endemic to a mossy cloud forest habitat near Wei-Assipu-tepui in western Guyana, at an elevation of ~1180 m. The region features dense leaf litter, peaty soils, and a humid, epiphyte-rich canopy.

The female holotype is the only known specimen.

== Ecology and behavior ==
The species is presumed fossorial or semi-fossorial, inferred from its cranial morphology and habitat. Unlike Xenopholis, no defensive behaviors such as body flattening have been observed.

The holotype contained lizard scales in its digestive tract, indicating that its diet includes lizards.
