= Rodriguesophis chui =

Conservation status
- Endangered (IUCN 3.1)

Scientific classification
- Kingdom: Animalia
- Phylum: Chordata
- Class: Reptilia
- Order: Squamata
- Suborder: Serpentes
- Family: Colubridae
- Genus: Rodriguesophis
- Species: R. chui

Binomial name
- Rodriguesophis chui (Rodrigues, 1993)

Species of snake

Rodriguesophis chui is a species of snake in the family Colubridae. It is found in Brazil.
