= Incaspis simonsii =

Conservation status
- Least Concern (IUCN 3.1)

Scientific classification
- Kingdom: Animalia
- Phylum: Chordata
- Class: Reptilia
- Order: Squamata
- Suborder: Serpentes
- Family: Colubridae
- Genus: Incaspis
- Species: I. simonsii

Binomial name
- Incaspis simonsii (Boulenger, 1900)

Synonyms
- Dromicus angustilineatus Schmidt & Walker 1943; Dromicus inca Schmidt & Walker 1943; Incaspis cercostropha Donoso-Barros 1974; Leimadophis simonsii Parker, 1932; Liophis angustilineatus Dixon 1980; Philodryas simonsii Boulanger, 1900 (original combination)

Species of snake

Incaspis simonsii is a species of snake in the family Colubridae. .

== Distribution ==
The species is native to Ecuador and Peru
