= Incaspis amaru =

Conservation status
- Data Deficient (IUCN 3.1)

Scientific classification
- Kingdom: Animalia
- Phylum: Chordata
- Class: Reptilia
- Order: Squamata
- Suborder: Serpentes
- Family: Colubridae
- Genus: Incaspis
- Species: I. amaru

Binomial name
- Incaspis amaru (Zaher, Arredondo, Valencia, Arbelaez, Rodrigues, & Altamirano-Benavides, 2014)

Species of snake

Incaspis amaru is a species of snake in the family Colubridae. The species is native to Ecuador.
