= Echinanthera melanostigma =

Conservation status
- Least Concern (IUCN 3.1)

Scientific classification
- Kingdom: Animalia
- Phylum: Chordata
- Class: Reptilia
- Order: Squamata
- Suborder: Serpentes
- Family: Colubridae
- Genus: Echinanthera
- Species: E. melanostigma

Binomial name
- Echinanthera melanostigma (Wagler, 1824)

Species of snake

Echinanthera melanostigma is a species of snake of the family Colubridae. The species is found in Brazil.
