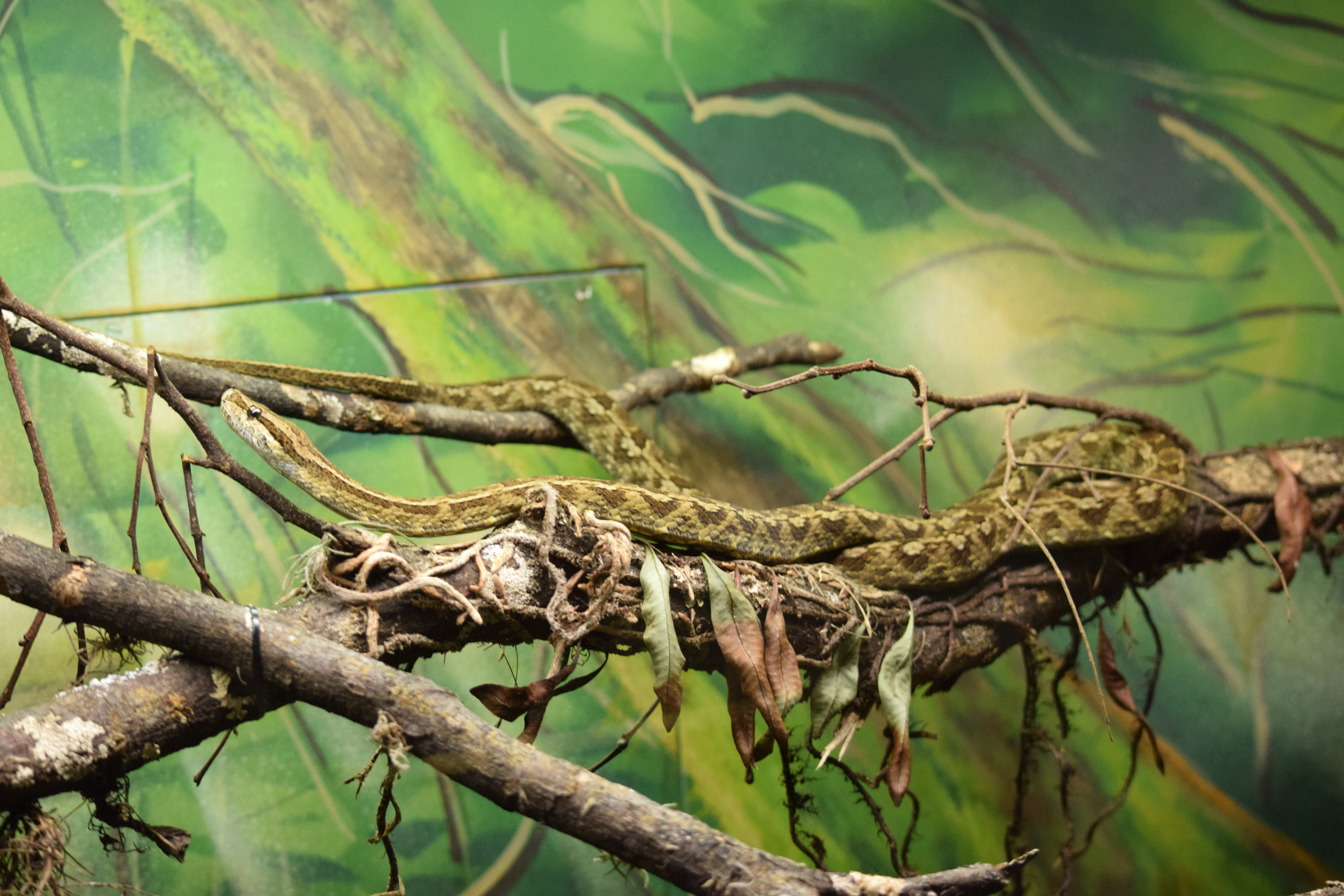

Conservation status
- Least Concern (IUCN 3.1)

Scientific classification
- Kingdom: Animalia
- Phylum: Chordata
- Class: Reptilia
- Order: Squamata
- Suborder: Serpentes
- Family: Colubridae
- Genus: Tropidodryas
- Species: T. striaticeps

Binomial name
- Tropidodryas striaticeps (Cope, 1870)

= Tropidodryas striaticeps =

Species of snake

Tropidodryas striaticeps is a species of snake in the family Colubridae. It is found in Brazil.
