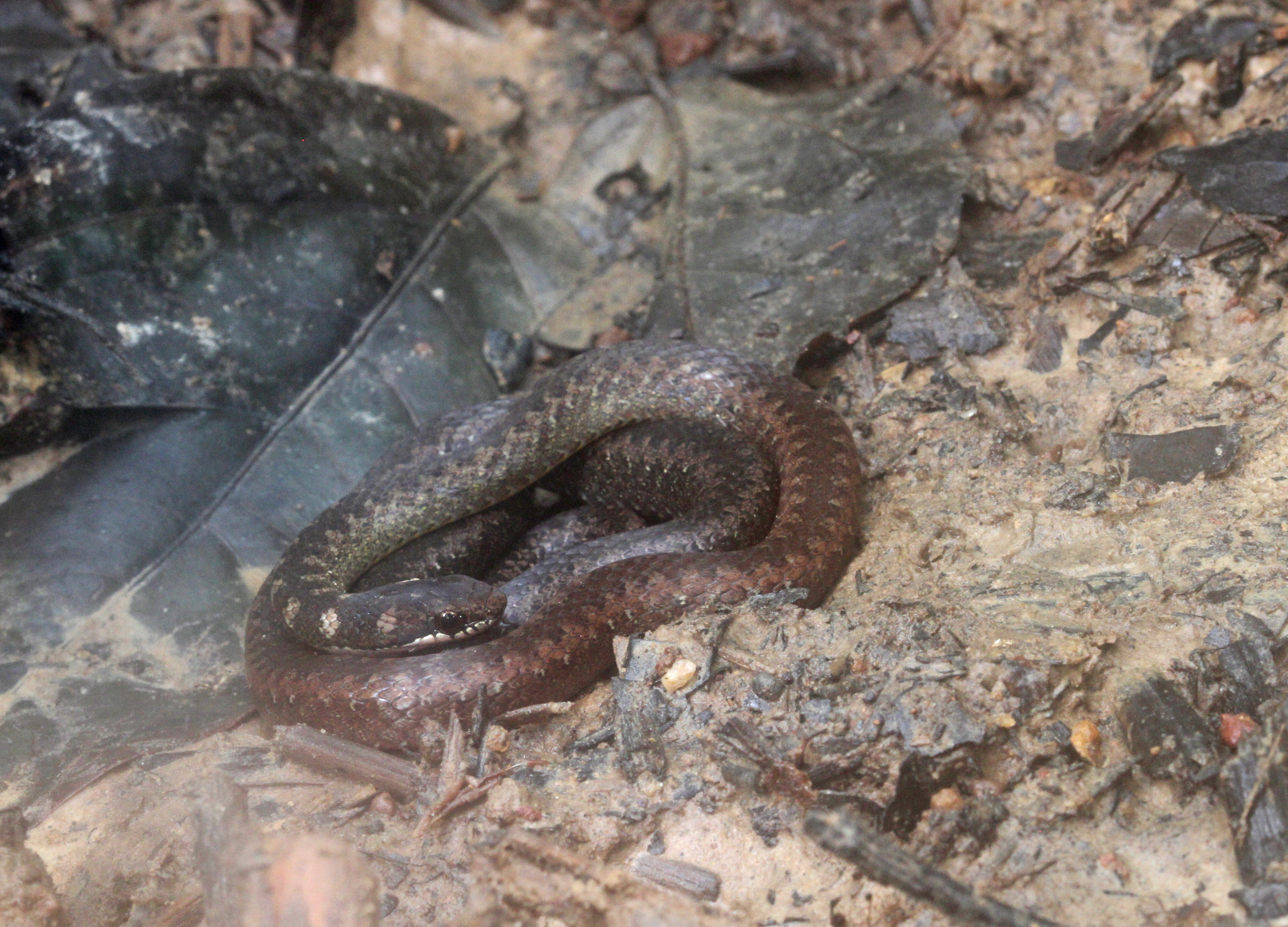

Conservation status
- Least Concern (IUCN 3.1)

Scientific classification
- Kingdom: Animalia
- Phylum: Chordata
- Class: Reptilia
- Order: Squamata
- Suborder: Serpentes
- Family: Colubridae
- Genus: Taeniophallus
- Species: T. nicagus

Binomial name
- Taeniophallus nicagus (Cope, 1868)

= Taeniophallus nicagus =

Species of snake

Taeniophallus nicagus is a species of snake in the family, Colubridae. It is found in Brazil, Suriname, and French Guiana. The species is listed as Least Concern on the IUCN Redlist.
