= Cenaspis =

Scientific classification
- Kingdom: Animalia
- Phylum: Chordata
- Class: Reptilia
- Order: Squamata
- Suborder: Serpentes
- Family: Colubridae
- Subfamily: Dipsadinae
- Genus: Cenaspis; Campbell, E.N. Smith & Hall, 2018
- Species: C. aenigma

Binomial name
- Cenaspis aenigma Campbell, E.N. Smith & Hall, 2018

Genus of snakes

Cenaspis aenigma is a species of colubrid snake in the subfamily Dipsadinae and the only member of the monotypic genus Cenaspis. It is endemic to the highlands of western Chiapas, Mexico, where it was described from a single, partially digested male specimen found in the stomach of a Central American coral snake (Micrurus nigrocinctus). This is referenced in its generic name, as cena is Spanish for "dinner". Despite being partially digested, the specimen still displayed many unique traits, including undivided subcaudals for the full length of the tail, as well as a simple hemipenis completely covered in calyces with a largely non-bifurcated sulcus spermaticus. These traits are not known from any other colubroid snake in the Western Hemisphere.

== Description ==
Dorsally, C. aenigma is uniformly pale brown. Ventrally, it is whitish with three dark stripes running the length of the belly on the ventrals, and one dark stripe running the length of the tail in the center of the subcaudals. The total length (including tail) of the holotype is 258 mm (10.2 in).
