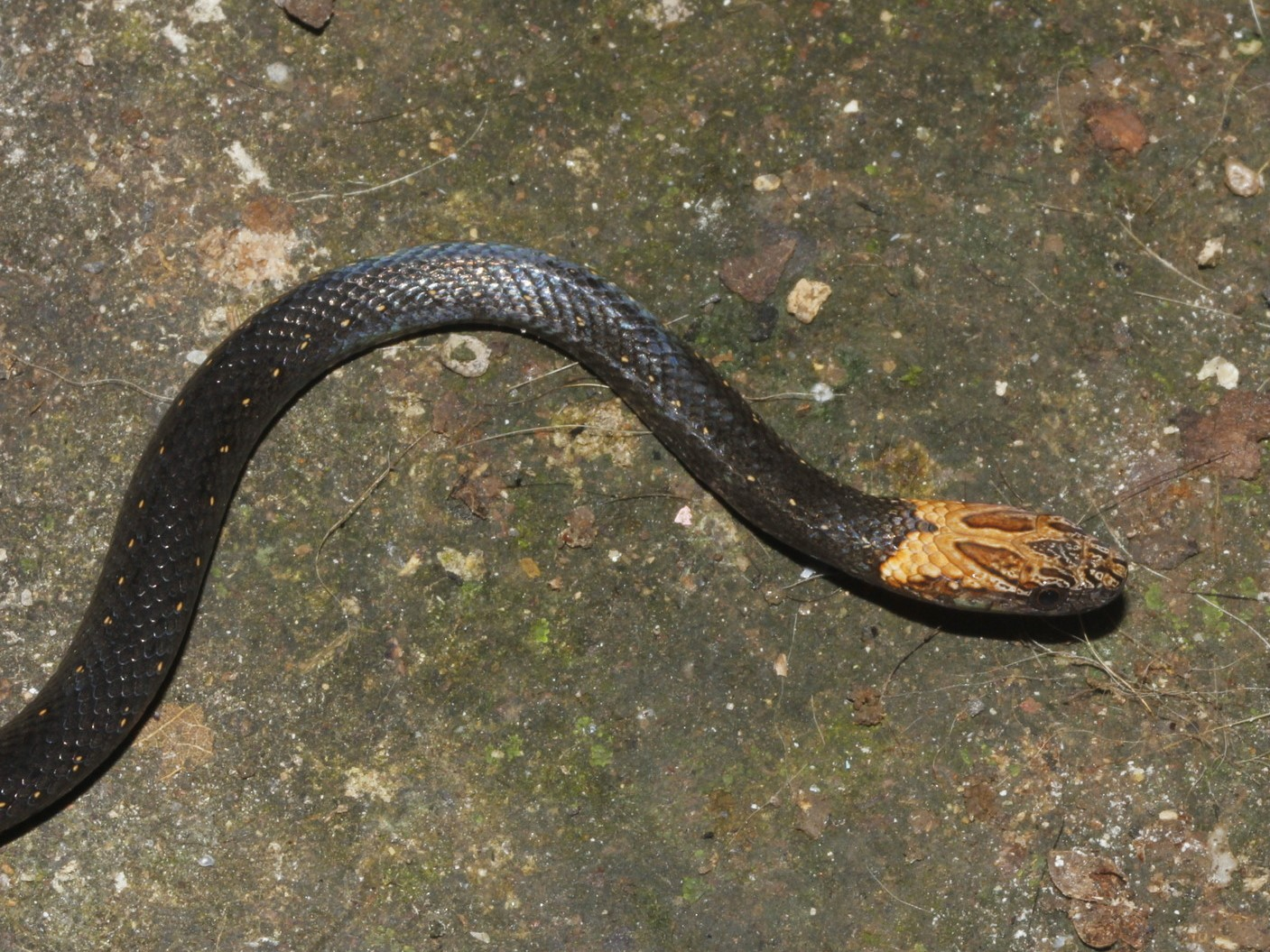

Conservation status
- Least Concern (IUCN 3.1)

Scientific classification
- Kingdom: Animalia
- Phylum: Chordata
- Class: Reptilia
- Order: Squamata
- Suborder: Serpentes
- Family: Colubridae
- Genus: Amastridium
- Species: A. sapperi

Binomial name
- Amastridium sapperi Werner, 1903)

= Amastridium sapperi =

Species of snake

Amastridium sapperi, the rusty-headed snake, is a species of snake in the family Colubridae. The species is found in Honduras, Guatemala, Mexico, and Belize.
