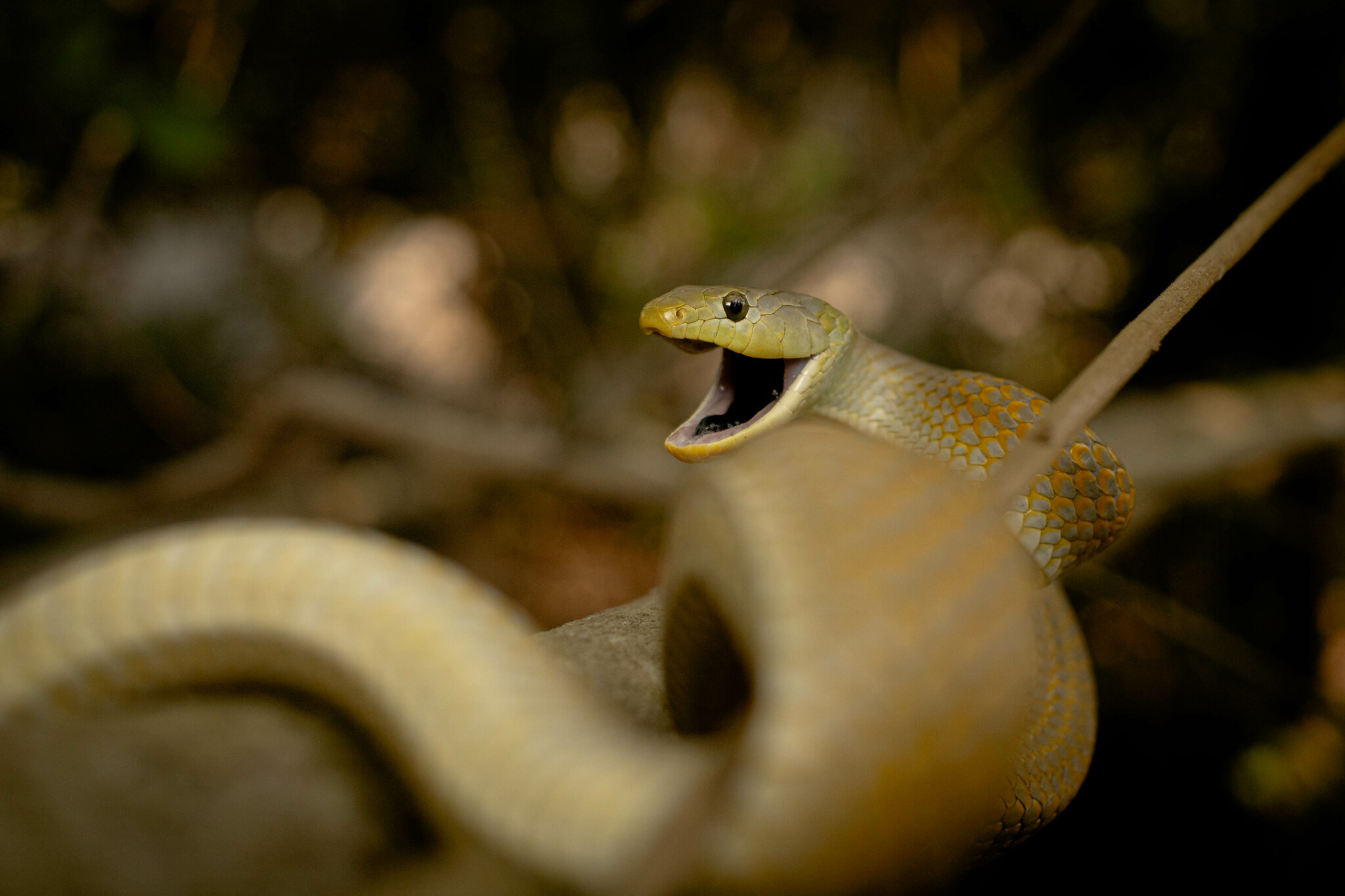

Scientific classification
- Kingdom: Animalia
- Phylum: Chordata
- Class: Reptilia
- Order: Squamata
- Suborder: Serpentes
- Family: Colubridae
- Genus: Chlorosoma
- Species: C. laticeps

Binomial name
- Chlorosoma laticeps (Werner, 1900)

= Chlorosoma laticeps =

Species of snake

Chlorosoma laticeps is a species of venomous snake of the family Colubridae.

== Geographic range ==
The snake is found in Bolivia and Brazil.
