= Hallberg's cloud forest snake =

Conservation status
- Data Deficient (IUCN 3.1)

Scientific classification
- Kingdom: Animalia
- Phylum: Chordata
- Class: Reptilia
- Order: Squamata
- Suborder: Serpentes
- Family: Colubridae
- Genus: Cryophis; Bogert & Duellman, 1963
- Species: C. hallbergi

Binomial name
- Cryophis hallbergi Bogert & Duellman, 1963

Genus of snakes

Hallberg's cloud forest snake (Cryophis hallbergi), also known commonly as la culebra de bosque mesófilo de Hallberg in Mexican Spanish, is a species of snake in the subfamily Dipsadinae of the family Colubridae. The species, which is endemic to Mexico, is monotypic in the genus Cryophis.

== Etymology ==
The specific name, hallbergi, is in honor of Thomas Boone Hallberg (born 1923), who is an American botanist who has been working in Mexico for over 50 years.

== Geographic range ==
C. hallbergi occurs in the Sierra Juarez and Sierra Mazateca of northern Oaxaca state, at elevations of 1,200–1,865 m (3,937–6,119 ft).

== Habitat ==
The natural habitat of C. hallbergi is undisturbed cloud forest.

== Reproduction ==
C. hallbergi is oviparous.
