= Dibernardia poecilopogon =

Conservation status
- Least Concern (IUCN 3.1)

Scientific classification
- Kingdom: Animalia
- Phylum: Chordata
- Class: Reptilia
- Order: Squamata
- Suborder: Serpentes
- Family: Colubridae
- Genus: Dibernardia
- Species: D. poecilopogon

Binomial name
- Dibernardia poecilopogon (Cope, 1863)

Species of snake

Dibernardia poecilopogon is a species of snake in the family Colubridae. The species is native to Brazil, Uruguay, and Argentina.
