= Apographon =

Conservation status
- Near Threatened (IUCN 3.1)

Scientific classification
- Kingdom: Animalia
- Phylum: Chordata
- Class: Reptilia
- Order: Squamata
- Suborder: Serpentes
- Family: Colubridae
- Genus: Apographon; Trevine, Grazziotin, Giraudo, Sallaberry-Pincheira, Vianna & Zaher, 2022
- Species: A. orestes

Binomial name
- Apographon orestes (Harvey & Muñoz, 2004)

Synonyms
- Tomodon orestes Harvey & Muñoz, 2004

Species of snake

Apographon is a monotypic genus of snake in the subfamily Dipsadinae of the family Colubridae. The genus contains the sole species Apographon orestes, which is native to central and southern South America.

== Geographic distribution ==
Apographon orestes is found in Argentina and Bolivia.

== Habitat ==
The preferred natural habitats of Apographon orestes are forest, shrubland, and grassland, at elevations of 1,300–3,400 m (4,300–11,200 ft), and it has also been found in disturbed areas such as roadsides and pastures.

== Reproduction ==
Apographon orestes is ovoviviparous.
