= Zonateres =

Conservation status
- Least Concern (IUCN 3.1)

Scientific classification
- Kingdom: Animalia
- Phylum: Chordata
- Class: Reptilia
- Order: Squamata
- Suborder: Serpentes
- Family: Colubridae
- Genus: Zonateres; Trevine et al., 2022
- Species: Z. lanei

Binomial name
- Zonateres lanei (Bailey, R.A. Thomas & da Silva Jr., 2005)

Synonyms
- Thamnodynastes lanei Bailey, R.A. Thomas & da Silva Jr., 2005

Species of snake

Zonateres is a genus of snake in the subfamily Dipsadinae of the family Colubridae. The genus is monotypic, containing the sole species Zonateres lanei, which is native to South America.

== Etymology ==
The specific name, lanei, is in honor of Brazilian entomologist Frederico Lane.

== Common names ==
Common names for Z. lanei include Lane's house snake in English, and cobra-espada and corre-campo in Brazilian Portuguese.

== Description ==
Z. lanei has strongly keeled dorsal scales, which are arranged in 17 rows on the neck, in 17 rows at midbody, and in 15 rows towards the cloaca. Each dorsal scale has two apical pits.

== Geographic range ==
Z. lanei is found in Argentina, Bolivia, Brazil, and Paraguay.

== Habitat ==
The preferred natural habitats of Z. lanei are forest and savanna.

== Behavior ==
Z. lanei is terrestrial and nocturnal.

== Diet ==
Z. lanei preys upon frogs.

== Reproduction ==
Z. lanei is viviparous.
