= Incaspis =

Scientific classification
- Kingdom: Animalia
- Phylum: Chordata
- Order: Squamata
- Suborder: Serpentes
- Family: Colubridae
- Subfamily: Dipsadinae
- Genus: Incaspis; Donoso-Barros, 1974

Species
- See text

Genus of snakes

Incaspis is a genus of colubrid snakes endemic to South America.

== Species and geographic ranges ==
- Incaspis amaru Zaher et al., 2014 – Ecuador
- Incaspis simonsii Boulenger, 1900 – Ecuador, Peru
- Incaspis tachymenoides (Schmidt & Walker, 1943) – Chile, Peru - Schmidt's green racer
