= Incaspis tachymenoides =

Conservation status
- Least Concern (IUCN 3.1)

Scientific classification
- Kingdom: Animalia
- Phylum: Chordata
- Class: Reptilia
- Order: Squamata
- Suborder: Serpentes
- Family: Colubridae
- Genus: Incaspis
- Species: I. tachymenoides

Binomial name
- Incaspis tachymenoides (Schmidt & Walker, 1943)

Species of snake

Incaspis tachymenoides, Schmidt's green racer, is a species of snake in the family Colubridae. The species is native to Chile and Peru.
