= Amastridium =

Scientific classification
- Kingdom: Animalia
- Phylum: Chordata
- Class: Reptilia
- Order: Squamata
- Suborder: Serpentes
- Family: Colubridae
- Subfamily: Dipsadinae
- Genus: Amastridium; Cope, 1861

Species
- Two recognized species, see text.

Genus of snakes

Amastridium is a genus of snakes in the subfamily Dipsadinae of the family Colubridae. The genus is native to Mexico, Central America and Colombia.

== Species and geographic ranges ==
The genus Amastridium contains the following two species which are recognized as being valid.

- Amastridium sapperi (F. Werner, 1903) – Guatemala, Honduras, Mexico
- Amastridium veliferum Cope, 1860 – Colombia, Costa Rica, Guatemala, Nicaragua, Panama

Nota bene: A binomial authority in parentheses indicates that the species was originally described in a genus other than Amastridium.

== Etymology ==
The specific name, sapperi, is in honor of German explorer Karl Sapper.
