= Taeniophallus nebularis =

Conservation status
- Critically Endangered (IUCN 3.1)

Scientific classification
- Kingdom: Animalia
- Phylum: Chordata
- Class: Reptilia
- Order: Squamata
- Suborder: Serpentes
- Family: Colubridae
- Genus: Taeniophallus
- Species: T. nebularis

Binomial name
- Taeniophallus nebularis Schargel, Rivas, & Myers, 2005

Species of snake

Taeniophallus nebularis is a species of snake in the family, Colubridae. It is found only in Northern Venezuela. The species is classified as Critically Endangered on the IUCN 3.1 list.
