= Dibernardia persimilis =

Conservation status
- Least Concern (IUCN 3.1)

Scientific classification
- Kingdom: Animalia
- Phylum: Chordata
- Class: Reptilia
- Order: Squamata
- Suborder: Serpentes
- Family: Colubridae
- Genus: Dibernardia
- Species: D. persimilis

Binomial name
- Dibernardia persimilis (Cope, 1869)

Species of snake

Dibernardia persimilis is a species of snake in the family Colubridae. The species is native to Brazil.
