= Caaeteboia gaeli =

Scientific classification
- Kingdom: Animalia
- Phylum: Chordata
- Class: Reptilia
- Order: Squamata
- Suborder: Serpentes
- Family: Colubridae
- Genus: Caaeteboia
- Species: C. gaeli

Binomial name
- Caaeteboia gaeli Montingelli, Barbo, Pereira-Filho, Santana, Rodrigues- França, Grazziotin, & Zaher, 2020

Species of snake

Caaeteboia gaeli is a species of snake in the family Colubridae. The species is endemic to Brazil.
