= Magliophis stahli =

Conservation status
- Least Concern (IUCN 3.1)

Scientific classification
- Kingdom: Animalia
- Phylum: Chordata
- Class: Reptilia
- Order: Squamata
- Suborder: Serpentes
- Family: Colubridae
- Genus: Magliophis
- Species: M. stahli

Binomial name
- Magliophis stahli (Stejneger, 1904)

Species of snake

Magliophis stahli, the Puerto Rican miniracer, is a species of snake in the family Colubridae. The species is native to Puerto Rico.
