= Chlorosoma dunupyana =

Scientific classification
- Kingdom: Animalia
- Phylum: Chordata
- Class: Reptilia
- Order: Squamata
- Suborder: Serpentes
- Family: Colubridae
- Genus: Chlorosoma
- Species: C. dunupyana

Binomial name
- Chlorosoma dunupyana (Melo-Sampaio, Passos, Martins, Jennings, Moura-Leite, Morato, Venegas, Chávez, Venâncio, & De Souza, 2020)

Species of snake

Chlorosoma dunupyana is a species of venomous snake of the family Colubridae from Brazil. It is endemic the state of Acre.
