= Echinanthera cyanopleura =

Conservation status
- Least Concern (IUCN 3.1)

Scientific classification
- Kingdom: Animalia
- Phylum: Chordata
- Class: Reptilia
- Order: Squamata
- Suborder: Serpentes
- Family: Colubridae
- Genus: Echinanthera
- Species: E. cyanopleura

Binomial name
- Echinanthera cyanopleura (Cope, 1885)

Species of snake

Echinanthera cyanopleura is a species of snake of the family Colubridae. The species is found in Brazil and Argentina.
