= Fanged water snake =

Conservation status
- Least Concern (IUCN 3.1)

Scientific classification
- Kingdom: Animalia
- Phylum: Chordata
- Class: Reptilia
- Order: Squamata
- Suborder: Serpentes
- Family: Colubridae
- Subfamily: Dipsadinae
- Genus: Ptychophis; Gomes, 1915
- Species: P. flavovirgatus

Binomial name
- Ptychophis flavovirgatus Gomes, 1915

Synonyms
- Paraptychophis meyeri Lema, 1967; Paratychophis flavovirgatus

Species of snake

The fanged water snake (Ptychophis flavovirgatus) is a species of snake in the family Colubridae. It is the only species assigned to the genus Ptychophis.

It is endemic to Brazil.

== Habitat ==
The fanged water snake is most commonly found in Brazil in the Atlantic Forest but are neotropical, and span a geographic scope that covers South America, Central America, the Caribbean, and southern Mexico. This species can be found in cooler and high altitude climates in terrestrial and lotic waters. As its name suggests, the fanged water snake appreciates ecosystems containing freshwater rivers, creeks and springs.

== Behavior ==
This species is ovoviviparous meaning it produces eggs that develop and hatch within the mother. This life history strategy allows protection from predators as well as more time in an optimal growth position. Once offspring are fully developed and metabolically independent, they are released. This life history strategy is more common in harsh environments and separation from the mother when developed increases chance of survival.

P. flavovirgatus is opisthoglyphous or "rear-fanged". A distinct trait in the Colubridae family, this type of fang is described as grooved long fangs near the back of the maxillae. This type of fang allows for the dispersal of venom into the wound of their prey when they "chew". Due to the diversity of this family of snakes, not much is known about the venom type of this species specifically. Although this is the case, colubrids are not usually able to eject doses fatal to humans and aren't as efficient as front fanged snakes.

The only record of this species food source is fish in captivity.

== Taxonomy ==
Originally described by João Florêncio Gomes in 1915, The fanged water snake is scientifically named Ptychophis flavovirgatus. The only species in the Ptychophis genus, its name is derived from greek, "ptychos" meaning leaf, layer or plate and "ophis" meaning serpent. The species epithet flavovirgatus is derived from the latin words, "flavus" and "virgatus" meaning golden, yellow or blonde and striped or streaked respectively describing its appearance.

== Conservation status ==
This species is identified under "least concern" by the IUCN. Although the species range of inhabitance includes fragmentation and native vegetation loss, they are not considered to be under any threat. This is due to their large range which includes an area of protection as well as no other potential threats. There is no record of population numbers but is still described as declining overall.
