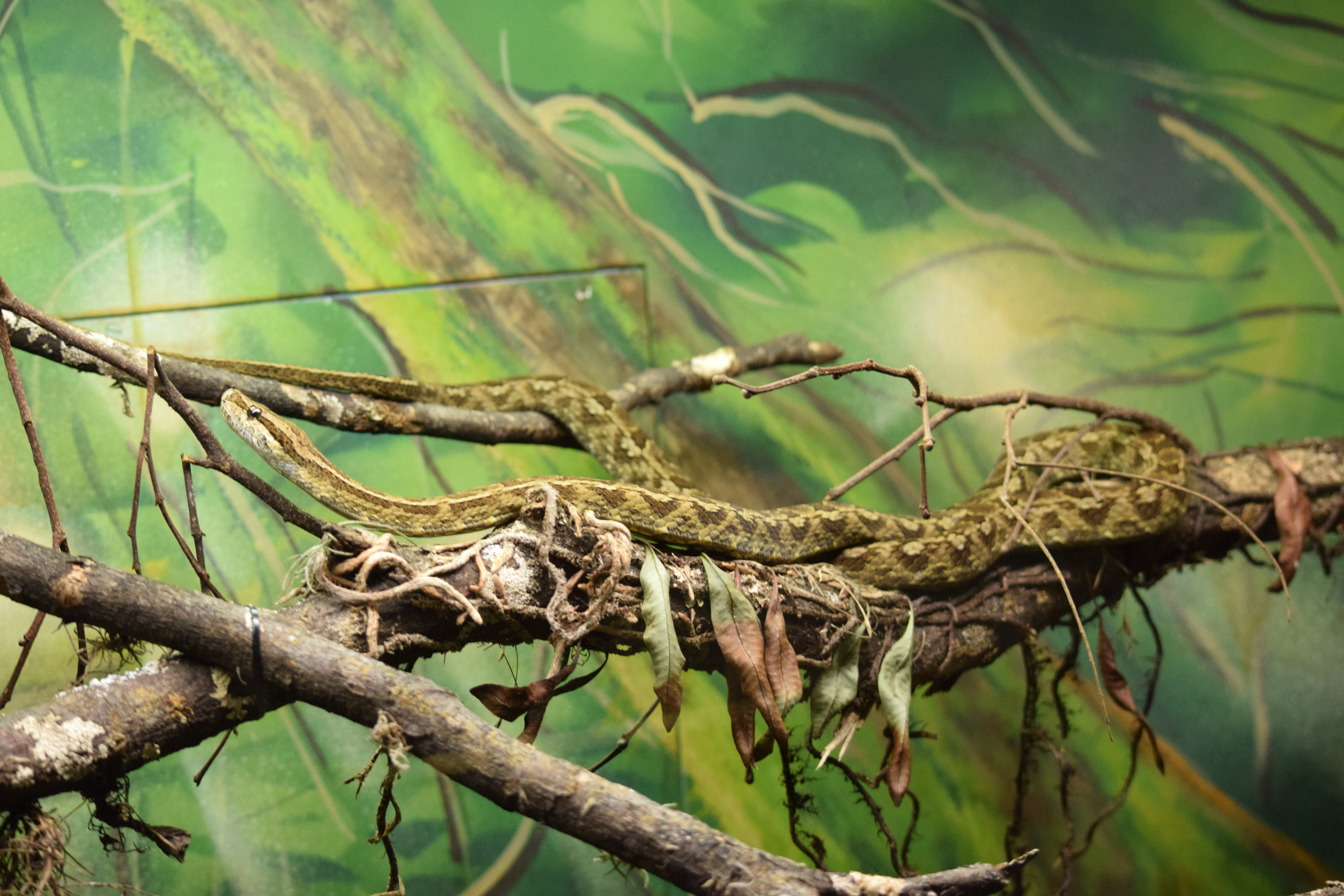
- Tropidodryas striaticeps

Scientific classification
- Domain: Eukaryota
- Kingdom: Animalia
- Phylum: Chordata
- Class: Reptilia
- Order: Squamata
- Suborder: Serpentes
- Family: Colubridae
- Subfamily: Dipsadinae
- Genus: Tropidodryas; Fitzinger, 1843

= Tropidodryas =

Genus of snakes

Tropidodryas is a genus of snakes of the subfamily Dipsadinae.

== Species ==
- Tropidodryas serra (Schlegel, 1837) - Serra snake
- Tropidodryas striaticeps (Cope, 1870)
