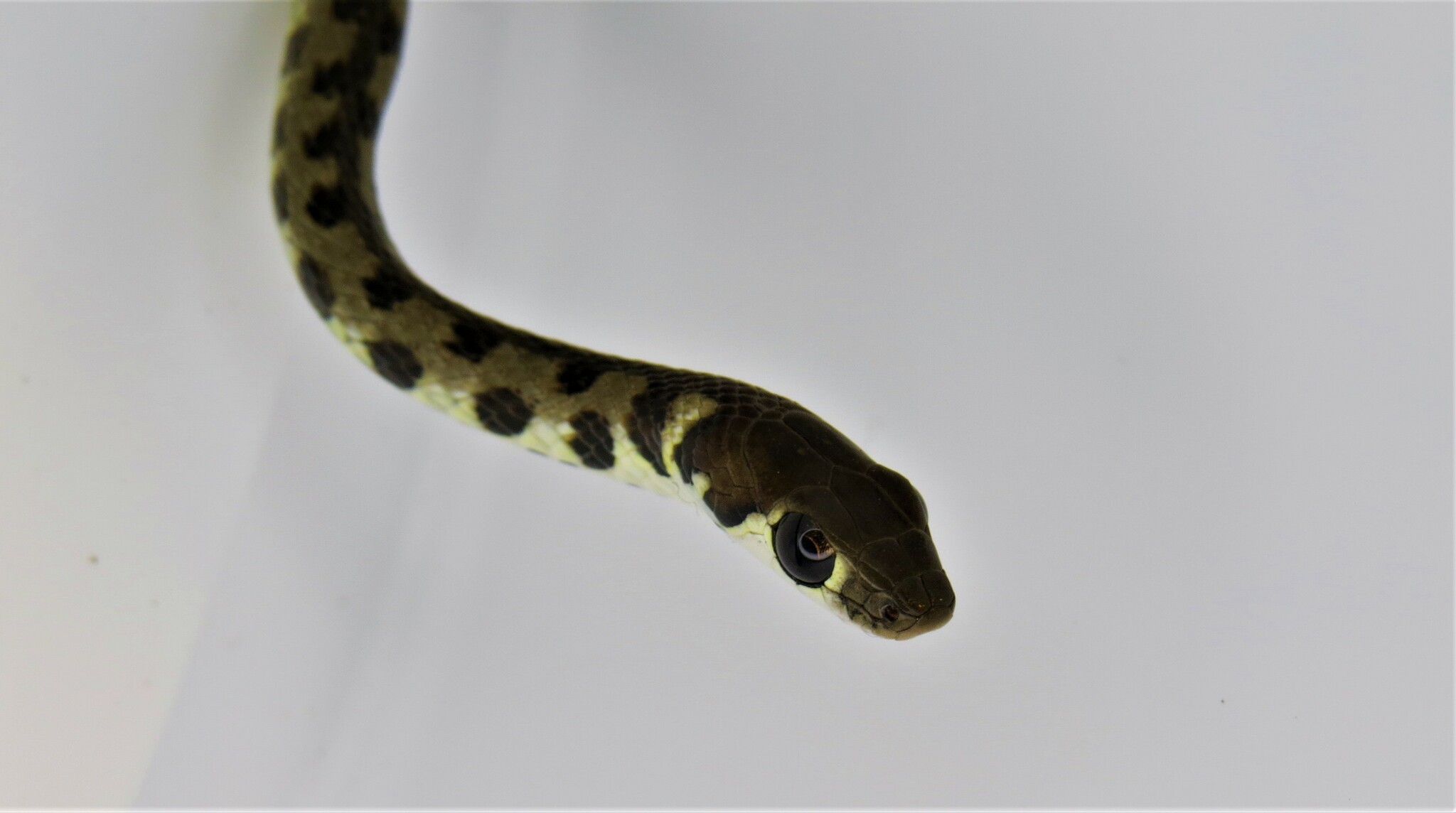
- Echinanthera Cephalomaculata

Scientific classification
- Domain: Eukaryota
- Kingdom: Animalia
- Phylum: Chordata
- Class: Reptilia
- Order: Squamata
- Suborder: Serpentes
- Family: Colubridae
- Subfamily: Dipsadinae
- Genus: Echinanthera; Cope, 1894

= Echinanthera =

Genus of snakes

Echinanthera is a genus of snakes in the family Colubridae.

== Species ==
- Echinanthera cephalomaculata Di Bernardo, 1994
- Echinanthera cephalostriata Di Bernardo, 1996
- Echinanthera cyanopleura (Cope, 1885)
- Echinanthera melanostigma (Wagler, 1824)
- Echinanthera undulata (Wied, 1824)
