= Tomodon =

Conservation status
- Least Concern (IUCN 3.1)

Scientific classification
- Kingdom: Animalia
- Phylum: Chordata
- Class: Reptilia
- Order: Squamata
- Suborder: Serpentes
- Family: Colubridae
- Genus: Tomodon; A.M.C. Duméril, 1853
- Species: T. dorsatus

Binomial name
- Tomodon dorsatus A.M.C. Duméril, Bibron & A.H.A. Duméril, 1854

Synonyms
- Tomodon dorsatum A.M.C. Duméril, Bibron & A.H.A Duméril, 1854; Opisthoplus degener W. Peters, 1883; Tomodon degener (W. Peters, 1883); Aproterodon clementei Vanzolini, 1947

Genus of snakes

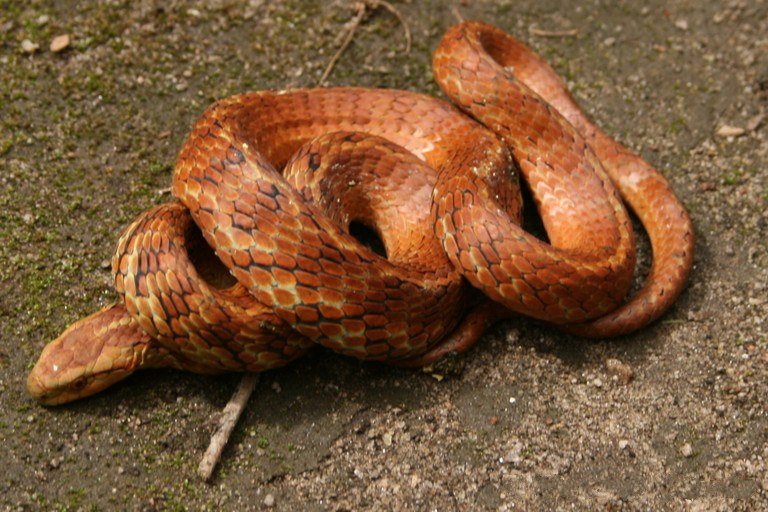
Tomodon dorsatus

Tomodon is a monotypic genus of snake in the subfamily Dipsadinae of the family Colubridae. The genus contains the sole species Tomodon dorsatus, also known commonly as the pampas snake, which is endemic to South America.

== Description ==
The eye of Tomodon dorsatus has a round pupil. The lining of the mouth is black. The last maxillary tooth is enlarged and grooved. There are seven upper labials. The smooth dorsal scales are arranged in 17 rows on the neck and at midbody, and reduced to 15 rows anterior to the cloaca.

== Geographic distribution ==
Tomodon dorsatus is found in northeastern Argentina, central and southeastern Brazil, Paraguay, and Uruguay.

== Habitat ==
The preferred natural habitat of Tomodon dorsatus is forest.

== Diet ==
Tomodon dorsatum preys exclusively upon molluscs.

== Reproduction ==
The mode of reproduction of Tomodon dorsatus has been described as viviparous and as ovoviviparous.
