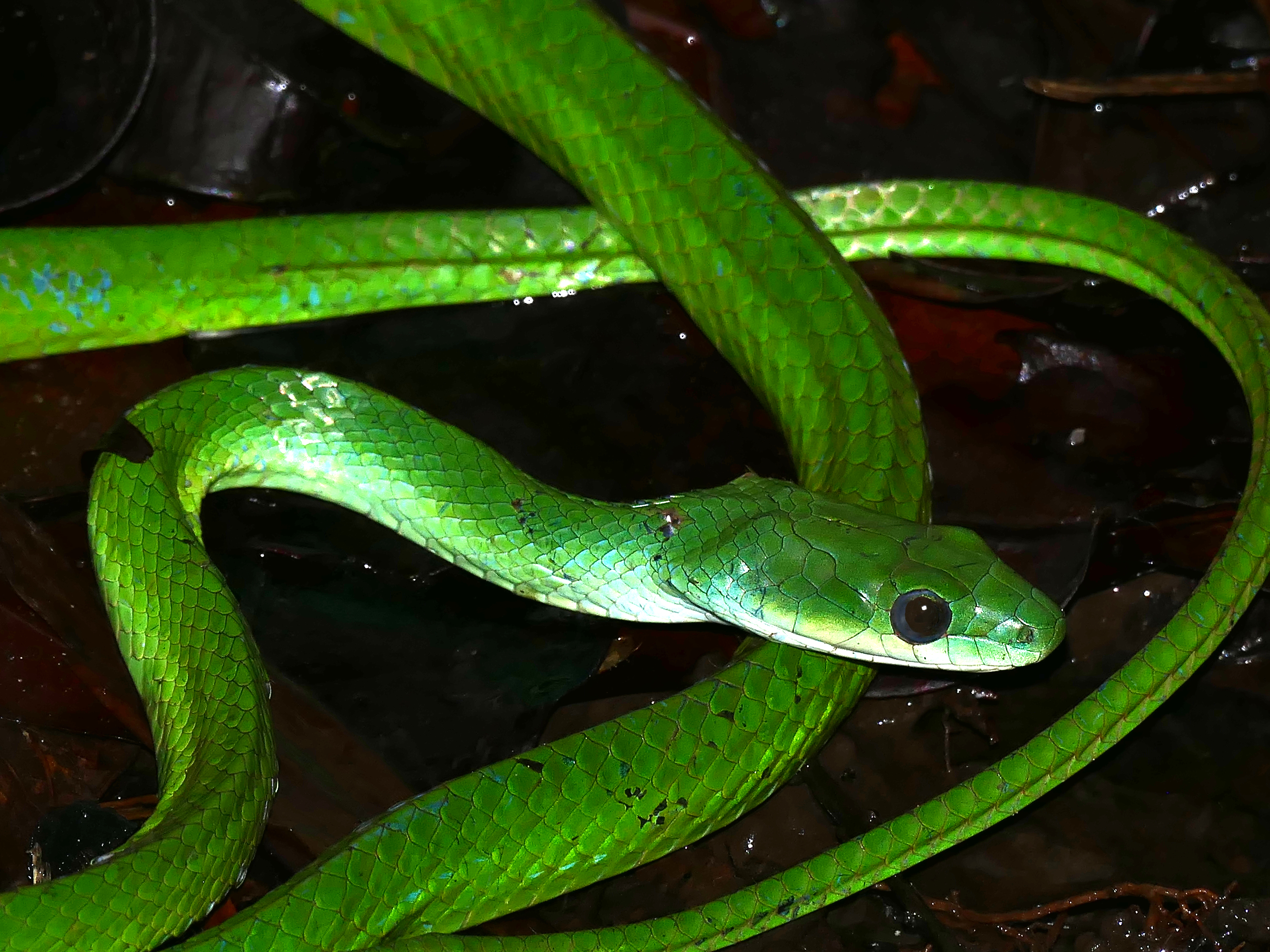

Conservation status
- Least Concern (IUCN 3.1)

Scientific classification
- Kingdom: Animalia
- Phylum: Chordata
- Class: Reptilia
- Order: Squamata
- Suborder: Serpentes
- Family: Colubridae
- Genus: Chlorosoma
- Species: C. viridissimum

Binomial name
- Chlorosoma viridissimum (Linnaeus, 1758)

= Chlorosoma viridissimum =

Species of snake

The common green racer (Chlorosoma viridissimum) is a species of venomous snake of the family Colubridae.

== Geographic range ==
The snake is found in South America.
