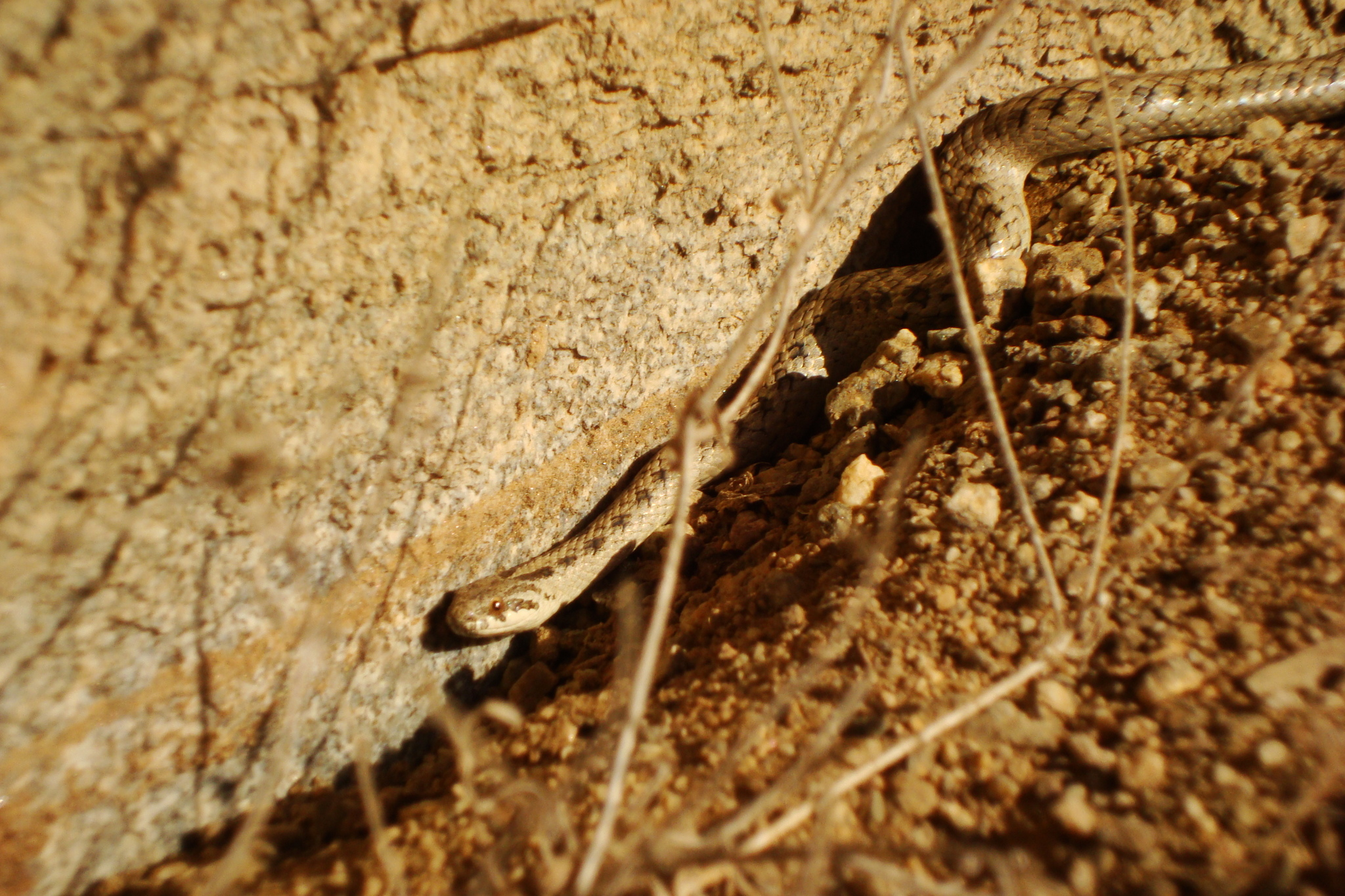
- G. chilensis

Scientific classification
- Kingdom: Animalia
- Phylum: Chordata
- Class: Reptilia
- Order: Squamata
- Suborder: Serpentes
- Family: Colubridae
- Subfamily: Dipsadinae
- Genus: Galvarinus; Trevine et al., 2022

Type species
- Tachymenis chilensis (Shlegel, 1837)

= Galvarinus =

Genus of snakes

Galvarinus is a genus of snakes in the subfamily Dipsadinae of the family Colubridae.

== Geographic distribution ==
All species in the genus Galvarinus are endemic to South America.

== Species ==
The following three species of Galvarinus are recognized as being valid.

- Galvarinus attenuatus (Walker, 1945) – Walker's slender snake
- Galvarinus chilensis (Schlegel, 1837) – Chilean slender snake
- Galvarinus tarmensis (Walker, 1945) – slender snake

Nota bene: A binomial authority in parentheses indicates that the species was originally described in a genus other than Galvarinus.
