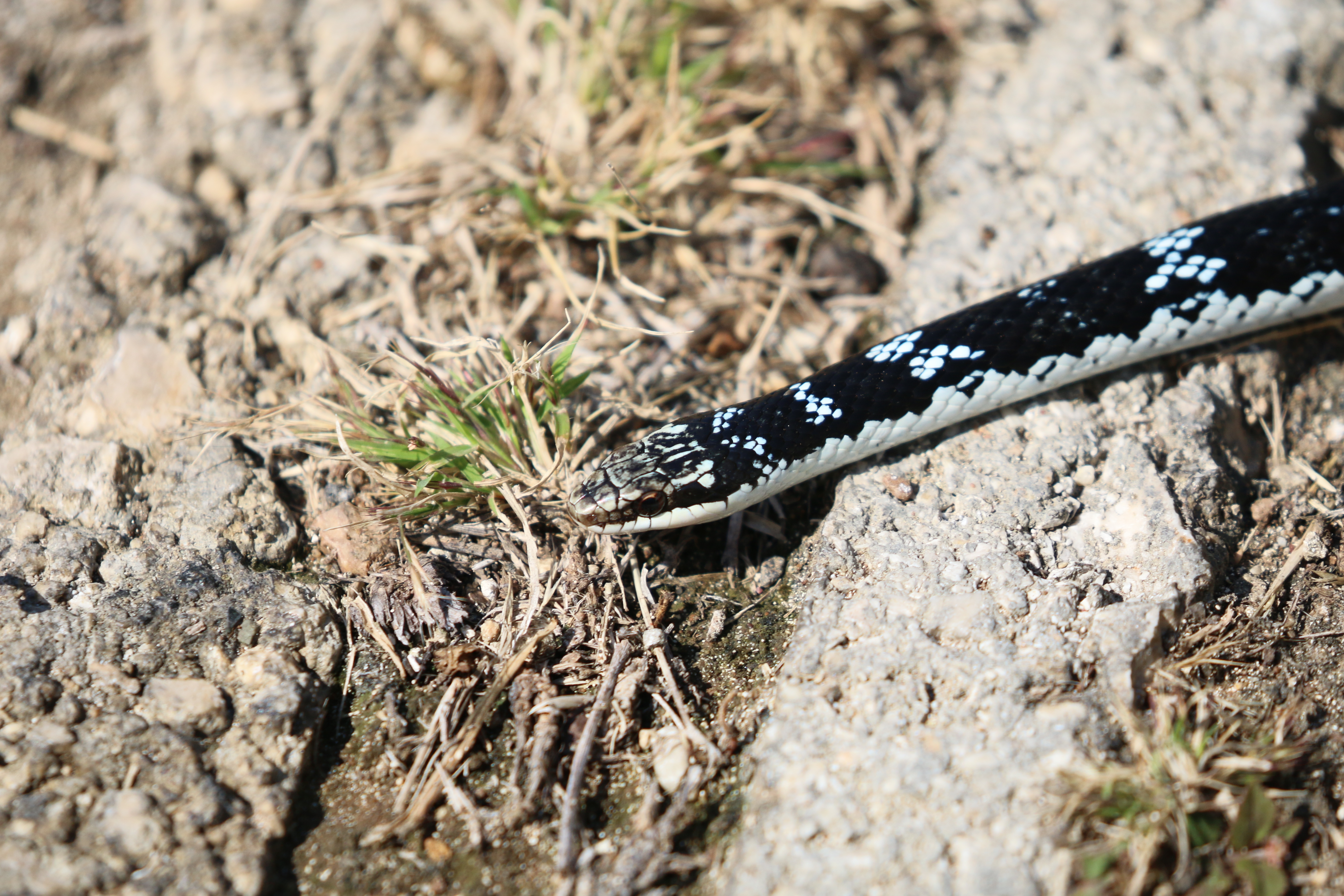
- C. andreae morenoi

Conservation status
- Least Concern (IUCN 3.1)

Scientific classification
- Kingdom: Animalia
- Phylum: Chordata
- Class: Reptilia
- Order: Squamata
- Suborder: Serpentes
- Family: Colubridae
- Subfamily: Dipsadinae
- Genus: Caraiba; Zaher, Grazziotin, Cadle, R. Murphy, Moura-Leite & Bonatto, 2009
- Species: C. andreae

Binomial name
- Caraiba andreae (J.T. Reinhardt & Lütken, 1862)

Synonyms
- List: Liophis andreae J.T. Reinhardt & Lütken, 1862; Dromicus cubensis Garman, 1887; Leimadophis andreae — Schwartz & Ogren, 1956; Dromicus andreae — Thomas & Garrido, 1967; Antillophis andreai — Schwartz & Henderson, 1991; Antillophis andreae — Kunz, 2005

= Caraiba =

Genus of snakes

Caraiba is a monotypic genus of snakes in the family Colubridae. The genus contains the sole species Caraiba andreae, also known commonly as the black and white racer or the Cuban lesser racer, which is endemic to Cuba. There are six recognized subspecies.

== Taxonomy ==
The genus name, Caraiba, is a reference to the Caribbean. The specific name, andreae, is in honor of a Danish ship's master, "Captain Andrea", who collected the holotype.

=== Subspecies ===
The following six subspecies are recognized as being valid, including the nominotypical subspecies.

- Caraiba andreae andreae (Reinhardt & Lütken, 1862)
- Caraiba andreae melopyrrha (Thomas & Garrido, 1967)
- Caraiba andreae morenoi (Garrido, 1973)
- Caraiba andreae nebulatus (Barbour, 1916)
- Caraiba andreae orientalis (Barbour & Ramsden, 1919)
- Caraiba andreae peninsulae (Schwartz & Thomas, 1960)

Nota bene: A trinomial authority in parentheses indicates that the subspecies was originally described in a genus other than Caraiba.

== Distribution and habitat ==
C. andreae is found throughout Cuba. It is also found on Isla de la Juventud (formerly called Isle of Pines), and on other smaller offshore islands.

The preferred natural habitats of C. andreae are shrubland and forest, at altitudes from sea level to 1,100 m (3,600 ft).

== Description ==
Dorsally, C. andreae is black, with a dorso-lateral series of yellow spots on each side. The upper labials are white. Ventrally it is white, with black markings. Adults may attain a total length of 65.5 cm (25.8 in), which includes a tail 21.5 cm (8.5 in) long.

== Reproduction ==
C. andreae is oviparous.
