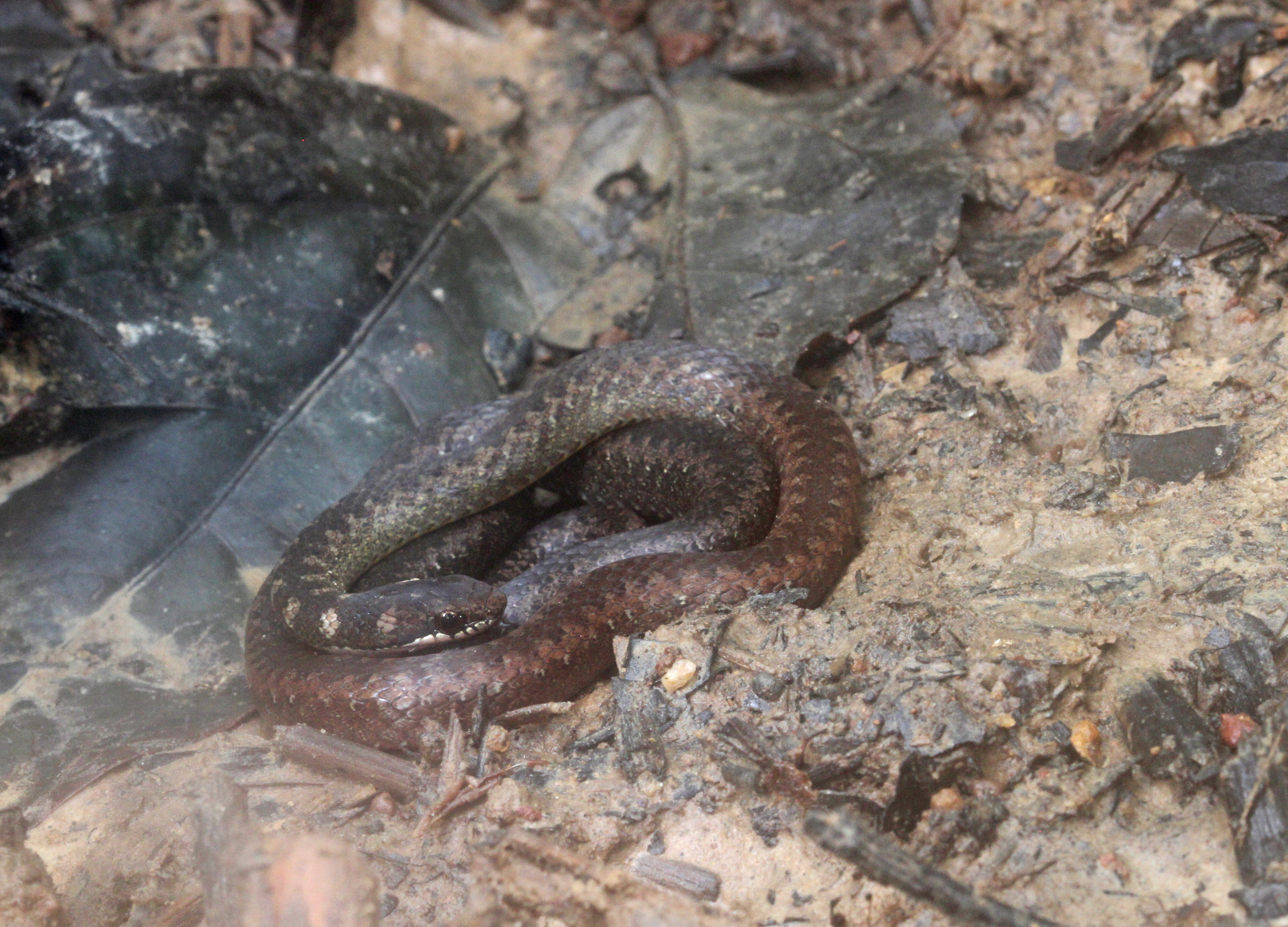
- Taeniophallus nicagus

Scientific classification
- Domain: Eukaryota
- Kingdom: Animalia
- Phylum: Chordata
- Class: Reptilia
- Order: Squamata
- Suborder: Serpentes
- Family: Colubridae
- Subfamily: Dipsadinae
- Genus: Taeniophallus; Cope, 1895

= Taeniophallus =

Genus of snakes

Taeniophallus is a genus of snakes of the family Colubridae.

== Species ==
- Taeniophallus brevirostris (Peters, 1863) - short-nosed ground snake
- Taeniophallus nebularis Schargel, Rivas & Myers, 2005
- Taeniophallus nicagus (Cope, 1868)
