= Hensel's snake =

Conservation status
- Vulnerable (IUCN 3.1)

Scientific classification
- Kingdom: Animalia
- Phylum: Chordata
- Class: Reptilia
- Order: Squamata
- Suborder: Serpentes
- Family: Colubridae
- Genus: Ditaxodon; Hoge, 1958
- Species: D. taeniatus

Binomial name
- Ditaxodon taeniatus (W. Peters, 1868)

Synonyms
- Philodryas taeniatus W. Peters in Hensel, 1868; Conophis taeniatus — Boulenger, 1896; Ditaxodon taemiatus — Hoge, 1958

Species of snake

Hensel's snake (Ditaxodon taeniatus) is a species of snake in the subfamily Dipsadinae of the family Colubridae. The species is endemic to southern Brazil, and it is monotypic in the genus Ditaxodon.

== Geographic range ==
D. taeniatus is found in the Brazilian states of Mato Grosso do Sul, Paraná, Rio Grande do Sul, and São Paulo.

== Habitat ==
The preferred natural habitats of D. taeniatus are forest and grassland, at altitudes of 800–1,800 m (2,600–5,900 ft).

== Description ==
The neotype of D. taeniatus has a total length of 54.3 cm (21.4 in), which includes a tail length of 12.2 cm (4.8 in). The maximum recorded total lengths are 86.4 cm (34.0 in) for a female, and 70.7 cm (27.8 in) for a male.

== Diet ==
D. taeniatus preys upon lizards and birds.

== Reproduction ==
D. taeniatus is oviparous. Clutch size is around ten eggs.
