= Rodriguesophis =

Scientific classification
- Kingdom: Animalia
- Phylum: Chordata
- Class: Reptilia
- Order: Squamata
- Suborder: Serpentes
- Family: Colubridae
- Subfamily: Dipsadinae
- Genus: Rodriguesophis; Zaher, Grazziotin, R. Murphy, Scrocchi, Benavides, Y.-P. Zhang & Bonatto, 2012

Species
- Three recognized species, see article.

Synonyms
- Phimophis

Genus of snakes

Rodriguesophis is a genus of snakes in the family Colubridae. The genus contains three species, all of which are endemic to Brazil.

== Description ==
The genus Rodriguesophis has the following characteristics. The rostral is spatulate and straight, not upturned. The loreal is absent. A dark nuchal collar is present, which is more or less distinct depending on the species. Juveniles are bright red dorsally.

== Species ==
The following three species are recognized as being valid.

- Rodriguesophis chui (Rodrigues, 1993)
- Rodriguesophis iglesiasi (Gomes, 1915) – Gomes's pampas snake
- Rodriguesophis scriptorcibatus (Rodrigues, 1993)

== Etymology ==
The generic name, Rodriguesophis, is in honor of Brazilian herpetologist Miguel Trefaut Rodrigues. The specific name, chui, is in honor of Brazilian zoologist Tien Hsi Chu.
