= Caaeteboia =

Scientific classification
- Kingdom: Animalia
- Phylum: Chordata
- Class: Reptilia
- Order: Squamata
- Suborder: Serpentes
- Family: Colubridae
- Subfamily: Dipsadinae
- Genus: Caaeteboia; Zaher, Grazziotin, Cadle, Murphy, Moura-Leite & Bonatto, 2009

Genus of snakes

Caaeteboia is a genus of snakes in the subfamily Dipsadinae of the family Colubridae. The genus is endemic to Brazil.

== Species ==
- Caaeteboia amarali (Wettstein, 1930) – Amaral's ground snake
- Caaeteboia gaeli Montingelli, Barbo, Pereira Filho, Santana, França, Grazziotin & Zaher, 2020
