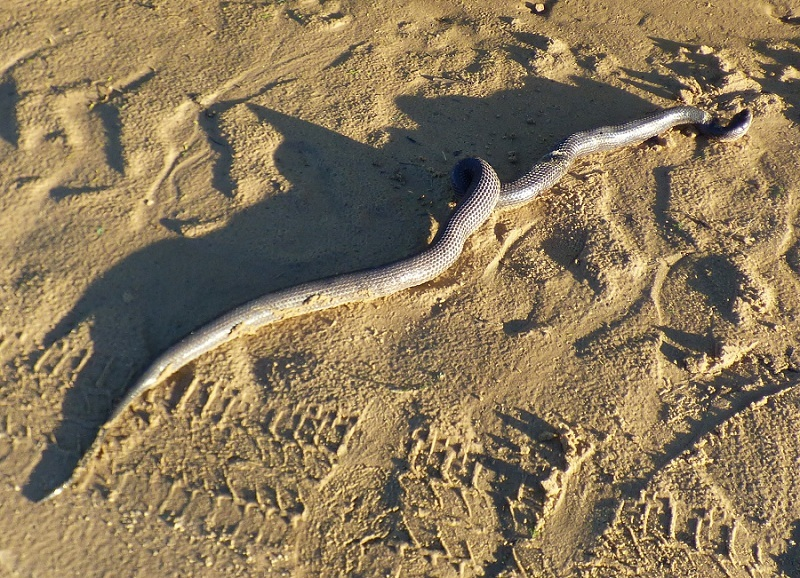
- Boiruna maculata

Scientific classification
- Kingdom: Animalia
- Phylum: Chordata
- Class: Reptilia
- Order: Squamata
- Suborder: Serpentes
- Family: Colubridae
- Subfamily: Dipsadinae
- Genus: Boiruna; Zaher, 1996

= Boiruna =

Genus of snakes

Boiruna is a genus of snakes in the subfamily Dipsadinae of the family Colubridae. The genus is endemic to South America.

== Species ==
The genus Boiruna contains the following two species.

- Boiruna maculata (Boulenger, 1896) – mussarana
- Boiruna sertaneja Zaher, 1996 – mussarana
