= Rhachidelus =

Conservation status
- Least Concern (IUCN 3.1)

Scientific classification
- Kingdom: Animalia
- Phylum: Chordata
- Class: Reptilia
- Order: Squamata
- Suborder: Serpentes
- Family: Colubridae
- Genus: Rhachidelus; Boulenger, 1908
- Species: R. brazili

Binomial name
- Rhachidelus brazili Boulenger, 1908

Genus of snakes

Rhachidelus is a genus of snake in the subfamily Dipsadinae of the family Colubridae. The genus is endemic to South America.

== Species ==
The genus Rhachidelus is monotypic, containing the sole species Rhachidelus brazili, which is commonly known as the Brazilian bird snake.

== Etymology ==
The specific name, brazili, is in honor of Brazilian herpetologist Vital Brazil.

== Geographic range ==
R. brazili is found in northeastern Argentina, southern Brazil, and southeastern Paraguay.

== Habitat ==
The preferred natural habitats of R. brazili are forest and savanna.

== Description ==
R. brazili is a medium-sized species of snake. The holotype has a total length of 1.32 m (4.3 ft), including the tail which is 0.31 m (1.0 ft) in length. The dorsal scales are smooth, have distinct paired apical pits, and are arranged in 25 rows at midbody. The vertebral row is enlarged. Adults are shiny dark brown to black dorsally, and dark brown ventrally. Juveniles have a red band across the back of the top of the head, including the parietal scales.

== Diet ==
The diet of R. brazili consists mainly of birds' eggs.

== Reproduction ==
R. brazili is oviparous.
