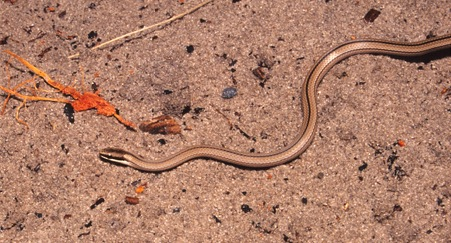
- Psomophis joberti

Scientific classification
- Kingdom: Animalia
- Phylum: Chordata
- Class: Reptilia
- Order: Squamata
- Suborder: Serpentes
- Family: Colubridae
- Subfamily: Dipsadinae
- Genus: Psomophis; Myers & Cadle, 1994

= Psomophis =

Genus of snakes

Psomophis is a genus of snakes in the family Colubridae. The genus is endemic to South America.

== Species ==
The genus Psomophis contains three species which are recognized as being valid.

- Psomophis genimaculatus (Boettger, 1885) – spirit diminutive snake, spirit ground snake, cobra-cabelo
- Psomophis joberti (Sauvage, 1884) – Jobert's ground snake, cobra-corredeira
- Psomophis obtusus (Cope, 1864) – wide ground snake, corredeira-do-banhado

Nota bene: A binomial authority in parentheses indicates that the species was originally described in a genus other than Psomophis.
