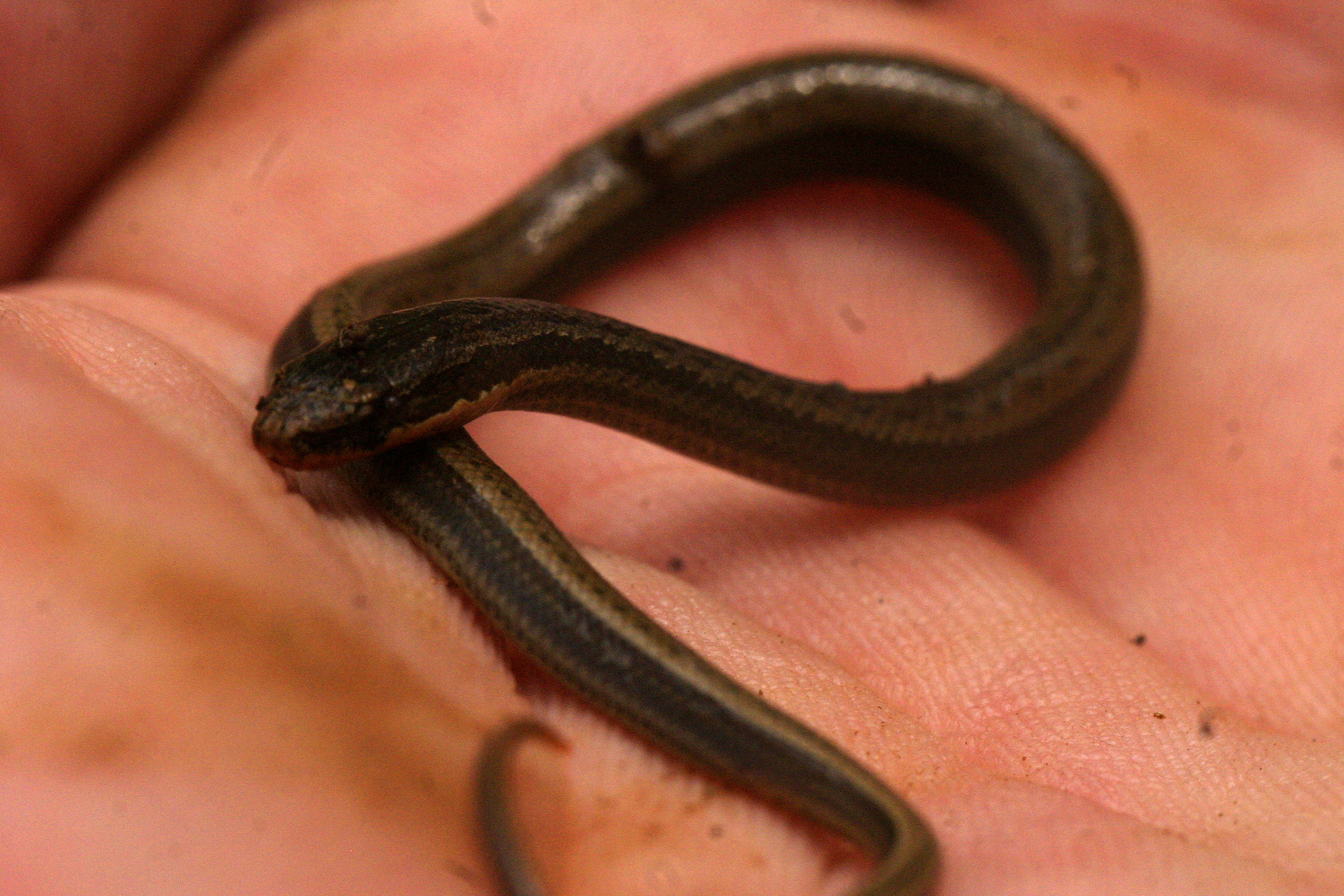
- Magliophis exiguus

Scientific classification
- Kingdom: Animalia
- Phylum: Chordata
- Class: Reptilia
- Order: Squamata
- Suborder: Serpentes
- Family: Colubridae
- Subfamily: Dipsadinae
- Genus: Magliophis; Zaher, Grazziotin, Cadle, Murphy, de Moura-Leite & Bonatto, 2009

= Magliophis =

Genus of snakes

Magliophis is a genus of snakes of the family Colubridae.

== Distribution ==
The 2 species of this genus are found in Puerto Rico, the United States Virgin Islands and the British Virgin Islands.

== Species ==
- Magliophis exiguus (Cope, 1863) - Virgin Islands miniracer, ground snake
- Magliophis stahli (Stejneger, 1904) - Puerto Rican miniracer
