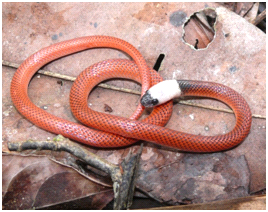

Conservation status
- Least Concern (IUCN 3.1)

Scientific classification
- Kingdom: Animalia
- Phylum: Chordata
- Order: Squamata
- Suborder: Serpentes
- Family: Colubridae
- Genus: Drepanoides; Dunn, 1928
- Species: D. anomalus

Binomial name
- Drepanoides anomalus (Jan, 1863)

= Drepanoides =

Genus of snakes

Drepanoides is a genus of snake in the family Colubridae that contains the sole species Drepanoides anomalus. It is commonly known as the black-collared snake.

It is found in South America.
