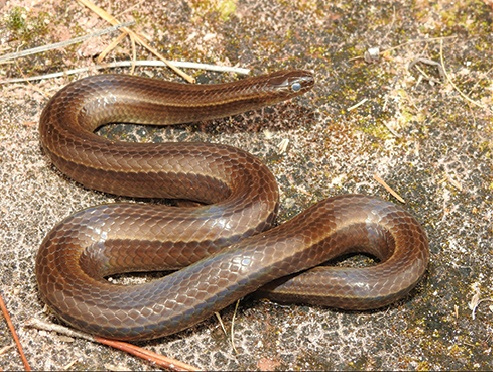

Conservation status
- Least Concern (IUCN 3.1)

Scientific classification
- Kingdom: Animalia
- Phylum: Chordata
- Class: Reptilia
- Order: Squamata
- Suborder: Serpentes
- Family: Colubridae
- Genus: Gomesophis; Hoge & Mertens, 1959
- Species: G. brasiliensis

Binomial name
- Gomesophis brasiliensis (Gomes, 1918)

Synonyms
- Tachymenis brasiliensis

= Brazilian burrowing snake =

Species of snake

The Brazilian burrowing snake (Gomesophis brasiliensis) is a snake endemic to Brazil. It is monotypic in the genus Gomesophis.
