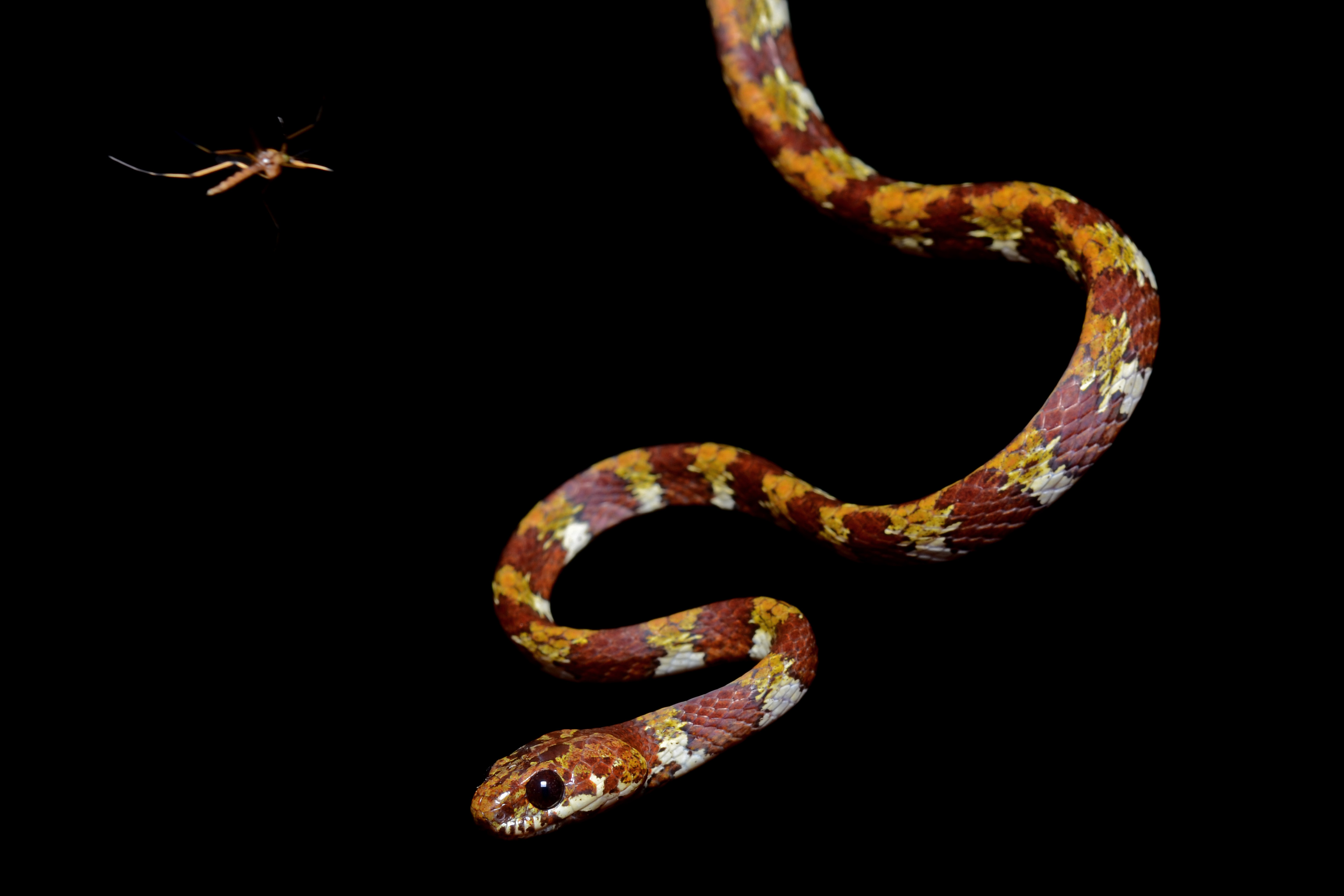
- Sibon longifrenis

Scientific classification
- Kingdom: Animalia
- Phylum: Chordata
- Class: Reptilia
- Order: Squamata
- Suborder: Serpentes
- Family: Colubridae
- Subfamily: Dipsadinae; Bonaparte, 1838

Synonyms
- Dipsadina Bonaparte, 1838; Dipsadidae Bonaparte, 1838

= Dipsadinae =

Dipsadinae Temporal range: Miocene–recent

Subfamily of snakes

Dipsadinae is a large subfamily of colubroid snakes, sometimes referred to as a family (Dipsadidae). Species of the subfamily Dipsadinae are found in most of the Americas, including the West Indies, and are most diverse in South America. There are more than 700 member species.

Dipsadinae are an ecologically and morphologically diverse group of mostly small to moderate-sized snakes, typically less than 80 cm (31 in) in total length. Some are arboreal, but others are aquatic or terrestrial and may even burrow. Most are oviparous. Many eat frogs or lizards, and some consume mammals and birds. Several genera (e.g. Adelphicos, Atractus, Geophis, Dipsas, Ninia, Sibon, Sibynomorphus, Tropidodipsas) are specialized feeders on gooey and slimy prey, such as frog eggs, earthworms, snails, and slugs. Many species have opisthoglyphous (rear-fanged) dentition. Almost all species are completely harmless to humans, although a few genera (e.g. Borikenophis, Cubophis, Heterodon, Hydrodynastes, Philodryas) have inflicted painful bites with local, non-life-threatening symptoms. However, the venom of one species, Tachymenis peruvianus, has caused human fatalities.

== Evolution ==
Molecular evidence indicates that Dipsadidae originated in Asia during the Early Eocene, about 50 Ma. Xenodontinae and Dipsadinae diverged once the family had reached Central America in the Middle Eocene, with the latter dispersing to trans-Andean South America in multiple waves between 38 and 20 Ma, whereas the former dispersed to cis-Andean South America about 39 Ma and entered the West Indies some 33 Ma.

== Synonymy ==
Some authors refer to part or all of this group as Xenodontinae, but if the two names are used synonymously, Dipsadinae is the correct name because it is older. When Xenodontinae is used non-synonymously, it normally refers to the larger and more derived South American-Caribbean subclade containing the genus Xenodon and its relatives, whereas Dipsadinae sensu stricto is restricted to the smaller and more basal Central American subclade containing the genus Dipsas and its relatives. Also, a third North American group (sometimes called "Carphophiinae") contains nine species in five genera at the base of the Dipsadinae (the "North American relicts" thought to have descended from the ancestors of dipsadines as they crossed from Asia to South America by way of North America; genera Heterodon, Farancia, Diadophis, Carphophis, and Contia).

== Genera ==
Within the Dipsadinae, the three major groups/clades or subfamilies are the Central American group ("Dipsadinae" sensu stricto), the South American + Caribbean group ("Xenodontinae"), and a small North American group (sometimes called the "Carphophiinae" or, incorrectly, "Heterodontinae"). (Note: "Heterodontinae" is a subfamily of sharks; this problem is discussed in Appendix I of Grazziotin, F. G., H. Zaher, R. W. Murphy, G. Scrocchi, M. A. Benavides, Y.-P. Zhang, and S. L. Bonattoh (2012): "The shark family Heterodontidae (based on the genus Heterodontus Blainville, 1816) dates from Gray (1851: 65), but its use as the snake family Heterodontidae (based on the genus Heterodon Latreille, 1801) dates from Bonaparte (1845) and it has not been used in the literature since. Thus both the genus and family names for snakes have priority over the sharks. However, the resurrection of the family name Heterodontidae for snakes (subfamily Heterodontinae in Vidal et al., 2007) causes unnecessary confusion owing to the long-standing use of the name for sharks (e.g. Compagno, 2002; Baldwin, 2005). Consequently, Rossman and Wilson (1965) and Zaher et al. (2009) argued that the family name should be applied only to sharks in the interest of maintaining nomenclatorial stability, a position that contrasts strongly with that of Vidal et al. (2007, 2010). According to Art. 52.2 of the Code, when two names "are homonyms, only the senior, as determined by the Principle of Priority, may be used as a valid name". We believe that if this clade of snakes continuously appears in phylogenetic studies, then it is desirable to petition the International Commission on Zoological Nomenclature to set aside use of the family name for the snakes in favor of the sharks in the interest of nomenclatorial stability. An alternative nomenclature would be to change the spelling of the shark family to Heterodontusidae. In any case, we suggest the North American relictual Xenodontinae (sensu Pinou, 1993; Pinou et al., 2004) should not be referred to as the subfamily Heterodontinae until a well defined nomenclatural resolution is obtained." See also Rossman, D. A. and L. D. Wilson (1965).) In addition, a number of snake genera are likely to be dipsadines based on their morphology and geographic range, but because of the absence of genetic data and information about their closest relatives, they are considered genera incertae sedis and are not currently placed in a subgroup of the Dipsadinae.

=== Central American clade ("Dipsadinae" sensu stricto) ===
- Adelphicos Jan, 1862
- Amastridium Cope, 1861
- Atractus Wagler, 1828
- Cenaspis Campbell, E.N. Smith & Hall, 2018
- Chersodromus Reinhardt, 1861
- Coniophanes Hallowell, 1860
- Cryophis Bogert & Duellman, 1963
- Dipsas Laurenti, 1768
- Geophis Wagler, 1830
- Hypsiglena Cope, 1860
- Imantodes A.M.C. Duméril, 1853
- Leptodeira Fitzinger, 1843
- Ninia Baird & Girard, 1853
- Plesiodipsas Harvey, Rivas, Caicedo-Portilla & Rueda-Almonacid, 2008
- Pliocercus Cope, 1860
- Pseudoleptodeira Taylor, 1938
- Rhadinaea Cope, 1863
- Sibon Fitzinger, 1826
- Tretanorhinus A.M.C. Duméril, Bibron & A.H.A. Duméril, 1854
- Trimetopon Cope, 1885
- Tropidodipsas Günther, 1858
- Urotheca Bibron, 1843

=== South American + Caribbean clade ("Xenodontinae") ===
- Tribe Saphenophiini Zaher, Grazziotin, Cadle, Murphy, Moura-Leite & Bonatto, 2009
  - Saphenophis Myers, 1973
  - Pseudalsophis Zaher, Grazziotin, Cadle, Murphy, Moura-Leite & Bonatto, 2009
- Tribe Psomophiini Zaher, Grazziotin, Cadle, Murphy, Moura-Leite & Bonatto, 2009
  - Psomophis Myers & Cadle, 1994
- Tribe Elapomorphiini Jan, 1862
  - Apostolepis Cope, 1861
  - Coronelaps Lema & Deiques, 2010
  - Elapomorphus Wiegmann, 1843
  - Phalotris Cope, 1862
- Tribe Tropidodryadini Zaher, Grazziotin, Cadle, Murphy, Moura-Leite & Bonatto, 2009
  - Tropidodryas Fitzinger, 1843
- Tribe Tachymenini Bailey, 1967
  - Apographon Trevine, Grazziotin, Giraudo, Sallaberry‐Pincheira, Vianna & Zaher, 2022
  - Calamodontophis Amaral, 1963
  - Dryophylax Wagler, 1830
  - Galvarinus Trevine et al., 2022
  - Gomesophis Hoge & Mertens, 1959
  - Mesotes Trevine et al., 2022
  - Ptychophis Gomes, 1915
  - Tachymenis Wiegmann, 1835
  - Tachymenoides Trevine et al., 2022
  - Thamnodynastes Wagler, 1830
  - Tomodon A.M.C. Duméril, 1853
  - Zonateres Trevine, Grazziotin, Giraudo, Sallaberry‐Pincheira, Vianna & Zaher, 2022
- Tribe Echinantherini Zaher, Grazziotin, Cadle, Murphy, Moura-Leite & Bonatto, 2009
  - Adelphostigma Abegg, Santos, Costa, Battilana, Graboski, Vianna, Azevedo, Fagundes, Castille, Prado, Bonatto, Zaher & Grazziotin, 2008
  - Amnisiophis Abegg, Santos, Costa, Battilana, Graboski, Vianna, Azevedo, Fagundes, Castille, Prado, Bonatto, Zaher & Grazziotin, 2022
  - Dibernardia Myers, 1974
  - Echinanthera Cope, 1894
  - Taeniophallus Cope, 1895
- Tribe Amnesteophiini Myers, 2011
  - Amnesteophis Myers, 2011
- Tribe Caateboiini Zaher, Grazziotin, Cadle, Murphy, Moura-Leite & Bonatto, 2009
  - Caaeteboia Zaher, Grazziotin, Cadle, Murphy, Moura-Leite & Bonatto, 2009
- Tribe Pseudoboini Bailey, 1967
  - Boiruna Zaher, 1996
  - Clelia Fitzinger, 1826
  - Drepanoides Dunn, 1928
  - Mussurana Zaher, Grazziotin, Cadle, Murphy, Moura-Leite & Bonatto, 2009
  - Oxyrhopus Wagler, 1830
  - Paraphimophis Grazziotin, Zaher, Murphy, Scrocchi, Benavides, Zhang & Bonatto, 2012
  - Phimophis Cope, 1860
  - Pseudoboa Schneider, 1801
  - Rhachidelus Boulenger, 1908
  - Rodriguesophis Grazziotin, Zaher, Murphy, Scrocchi, Benavides, Zhang & Bonatto, 2012
  - Siphlophis Fitzinger, 1843
- Tribe Philodryadini Cope, 1886
  - Chlorosoma Wagler, 1830
  - Ditaxodon Hoge, 1958
  - Incaspis Donoso-Barros, 1974
  - Philodryas Wagler, 1830
  - Xenoxybelis Machado, 1993
- Tribe Conophiini Zaher, Grazziotin, Cadle, Murphy, Moura-Leite & Bonatto, 2009
  - Conophis W. Peters, 1860
  - Manolepis Cope, 1885
- Tribe Hydrodynastini Zaher, Grazziotin, Cadle, Murphy, Moura-Leite & Bonatto, 2009
  - Hydrodynastes Fitzinger, 1843
- Tribe Hydropsini Dowling, 1975
  - Helicops Wagler, 1828
  - Hydrops Wagler, 1830
  - Pseudoeryx Fitzinger, 1826
- Tribe Xenodontini Bonaparte, 1845
  - Arcanumophis Smaga, Ttito & Catenazzi, 2019
  - Baliodryas Zaher & Prudente, 2019
  - Erythrolamprus Wagler, 1830
  - Eutrachelophis Myers & McDowell, 2014
  - Lygophis Fitzinger, 1843
  - Xenodon H. Boie, 1826
- Tribe Alsophiini Fitzinger, 1843
  - Alsophis Fitzinger, 1843
  - Arrhyton Günther, 1858
  - Borikenophis Hedges & Vidal, 2009
  - Caraiba Zaher, Grazziotin, Cadle, Murphy, Moura-Leite & Bonatto, 2009
  - Cubophis Hedges & Vidal, 2009
  - Haitiophis Hedges & Vidal, 2009
  - Hypsirhynchus Günther, 1858
  - Ialtris Cope, 1862
  - Magliophis Zaher, Grazziotin, Cadle, Murphy, Moura-Leite & Bonatto, 2009
  - Uromacer A.M.C. Duméril, Bibron & A.H.A. Duméril, 1854
- Tribe incertae sedis
  - Paikwaophis Kok & Means, 2023
  - Xenopholis W. Peters, 1869

=== North American clade ("Carphophiinae") ===
- Carphophis Gervais, 1843
- Contia Girard, 1853
- Diadophis Girard, 1853
- Farancia Gray, 1842
- Heterodon Latreille (in Sonnini & Latreille), 1801

=== Genera incertae sedis ===
- Cercophis Fitzinger, 1843
- Crisantophis Villa, 1971
- Diaphorolepis Jan, 1863
- Emmochliophis Fritts & H.M. Smith, 1969
- Enuliophis McCranie & Villa, 1993
- Enulius Cope, 1870
- Hydromorphus W. Peters, 1859
- Lioheterophis Amaral, 1935
- Nothopsis Cope 1871
- Omoadiphas G. Köhler, Wilson & McCranie, 2001
- Rhadinella H.M. Smith, 1941
- Rhadinophanes Myers & Campbell, 1981
- Sordellina Procter, 1923
- Synophis Peracca, 1896
- Tantalophis Duellman, 1958
- Thermophis Malnate, 1953 (the only Asian genus, likely at the base of the entire clade or at the base of the Dipsadinae + Natricinae clade)
