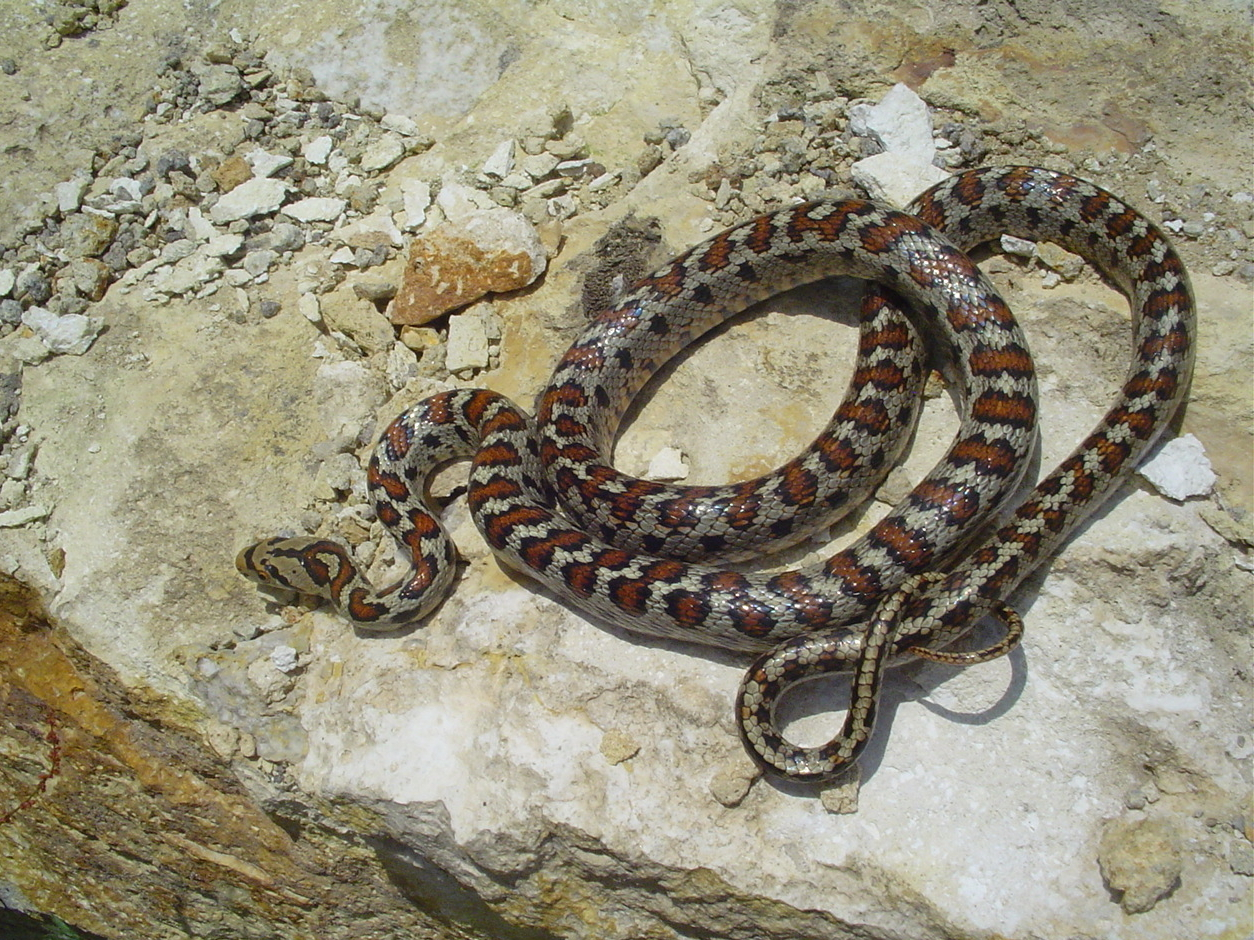
- European ratsnake, Zamenis situla

Scientific classification
- Kingdom: Animalia
- Phylum: Chordata
- Class: Reptilia
- Order: Squamata
- Suborder: Serpentes
- Family: Colubridae
- Subfamily: Colubrinae; Oppel, 1811

Genera
- Nearly 100, see text

= Colubrinae =

Colubrinae Temporal range: Oligocene-Holocene, 33.9–0 Ma

Subfamily of snakes

The Colubrinae are a subfamily of snakes within the family Colubridae. It includes numerous genera, and although taxonomic sources often disagree on the exact number, the Reptile Database lists 717 species in 92 genera as of September 2019. It is the second largest subfamily of colubrids, after Dipsadinae. Many of the most commonly known snakes are members of this subfamily, including rat snakes, king snakes, milk snakes, vine snakes, and indigo snakes.

== Distribution ==
Colubrine snakes are distributed worldwide, with the highest diversity in North America, Asia, northern Africa, and the Middle East. There are relatively few species of colubrine snakes in Europe, South America, Australia, and southern Africa, and none in Madagascar, the Caribbean, or the Pacific Islands.

== Description ==
Colubrine snakes are extremely morphologically and ecologically diverse. Many are terrestrial, and there are specialized fossorial (e.g. Tantilla) and arboreal (e.g. Oxybelis) groups, but no truly aquatic groups. Some of the most powerful constrictors (e.g. Pantherophis, Pituophis, Lampropeltis) are members of this group, as are a few snakes that have strong enough venom to kill humans (i.e. boomslangs [Dispholidus] and twigsnakes [Thelotornis]).

== Classification ==
Colubrinae is one of several subfamilies within the family Colubridae, the largest family of snakes. Its phylogeny can be shown in the cladogram below:

- Colubridae
  - - - Sibynophiinae
      - Natricinae
    - - Pseudoxenodontinae
      - Dipsadinae
  - - - Grayiinae
      - Calamariinae
    - - Ahaetuliinae
      - Colubrinae

Within Colubrinae, genera and species seem to make up five distinct radiations that are to varying degrees broadly similar in terms of ecology and geographic distribution, although increased sampling is needed to determine whether all species currently placed in Colubrinae fit into one of these groups. These correspond roughly to the historically recognized tribe names Sonorini, Colubrini, Boigini/Lycodontini, Dispholidini, and Lampropeltini.

Coluber is the type genus of both Colubrinae and Colubridae and the basis for the name Colubroidea, and it is one of only three snake genera named by Carl Linnaeus still in use for a snake today.

== List of genera ==
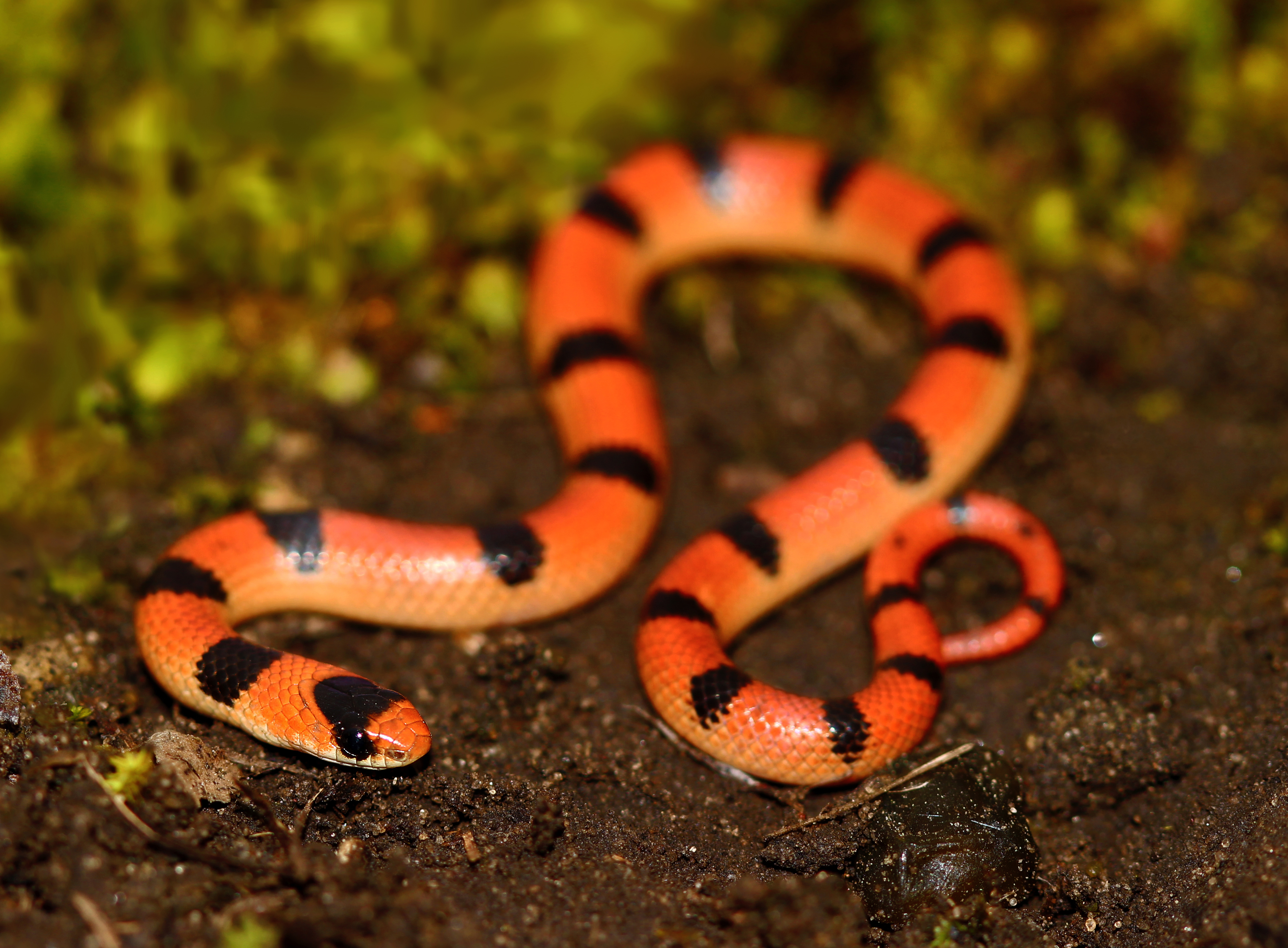
Sonora semiannulata (groundsnake)

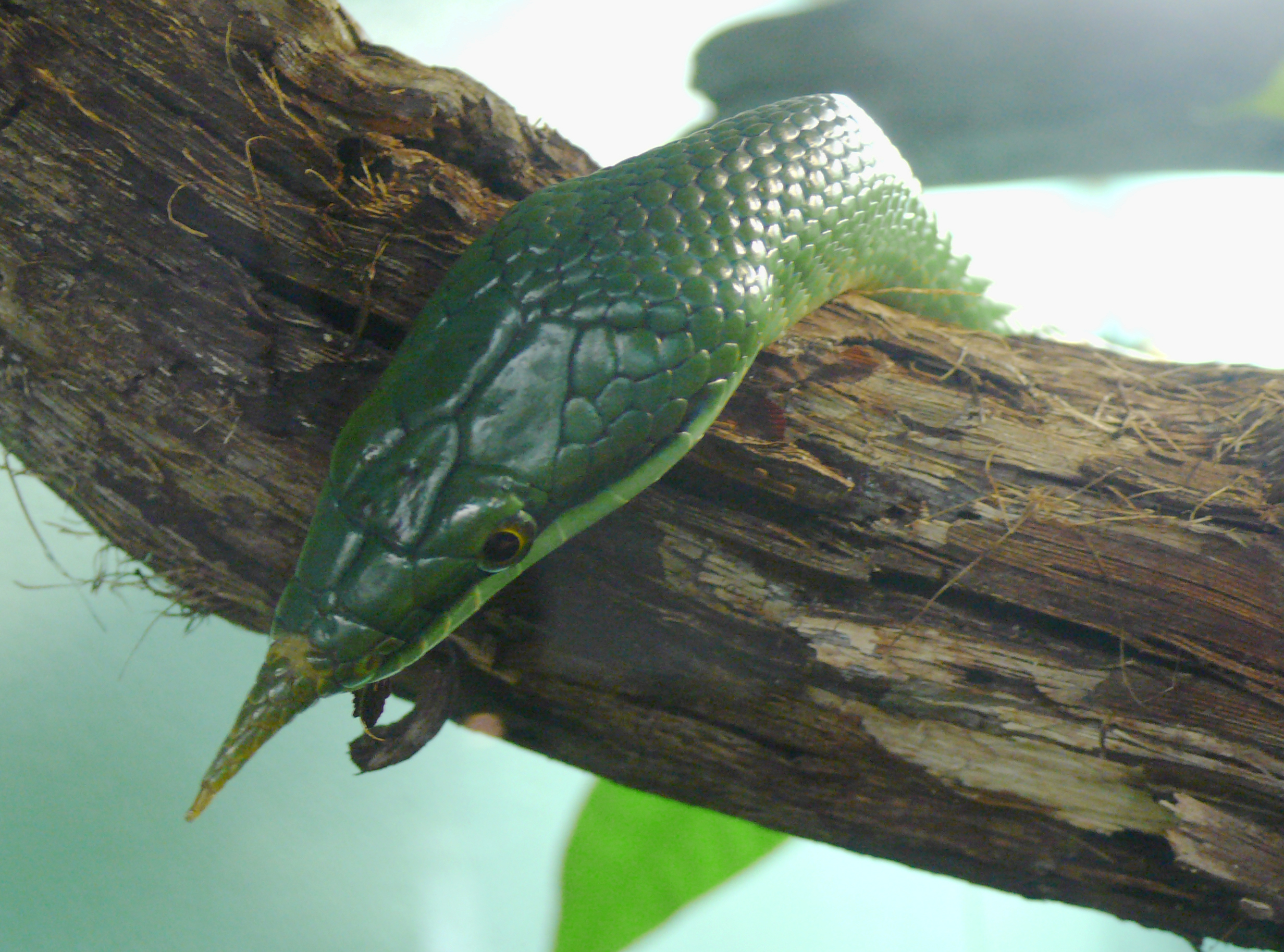
Gonyosoma boulengeri (rhino rat snake)

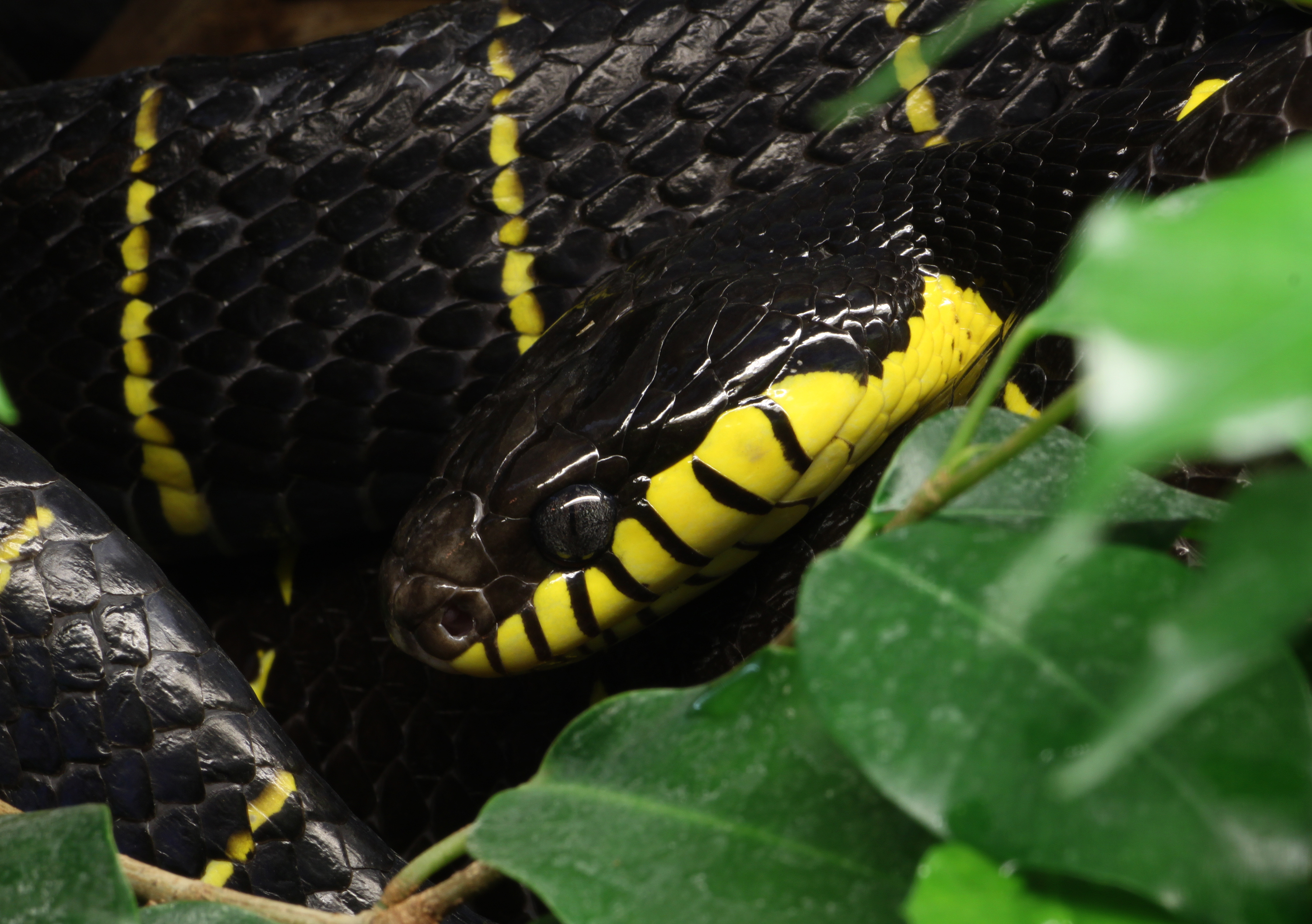
Boiga dendrophila (mangrove snake)

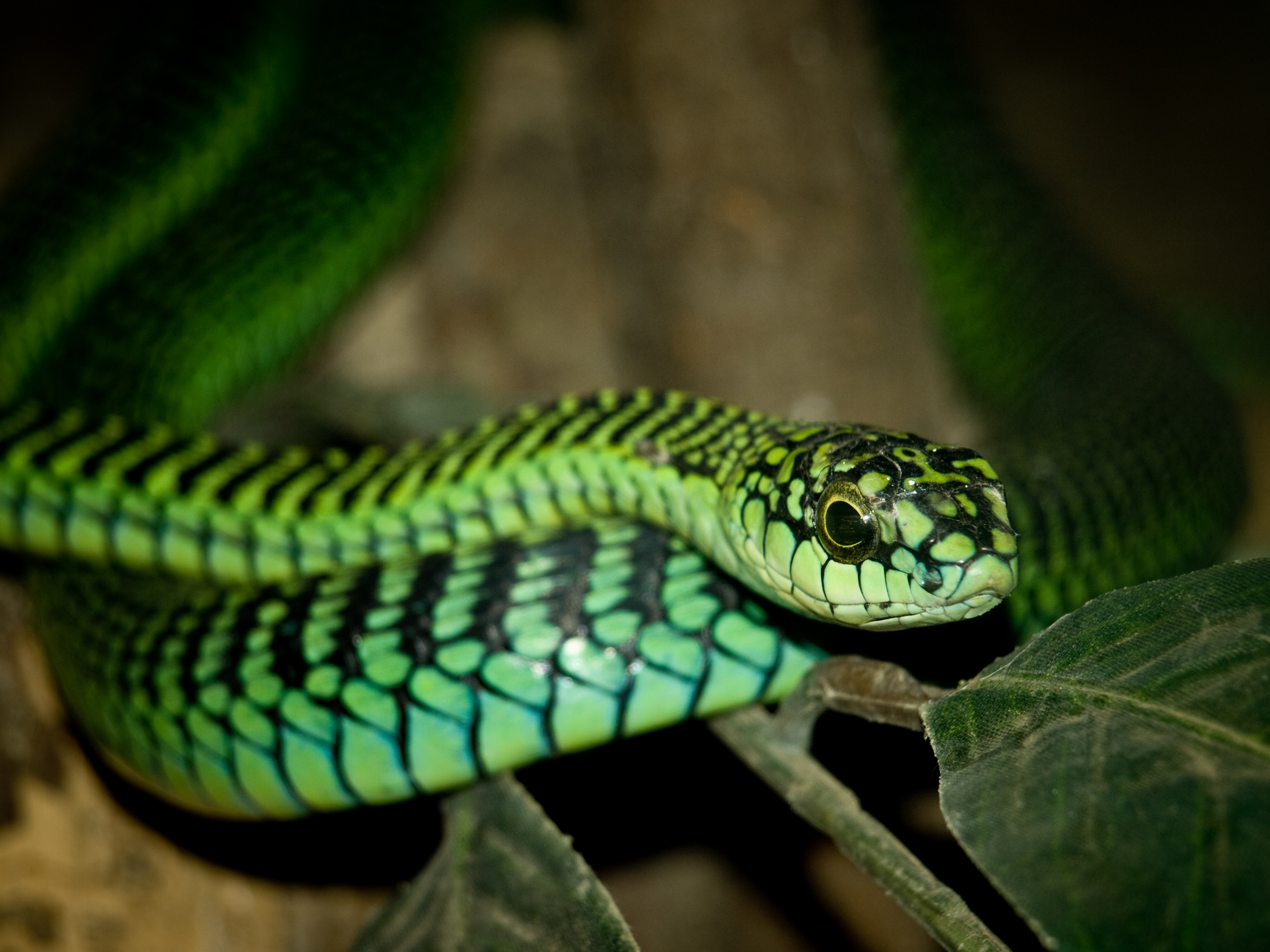
Dispholidus typus (boomslang)

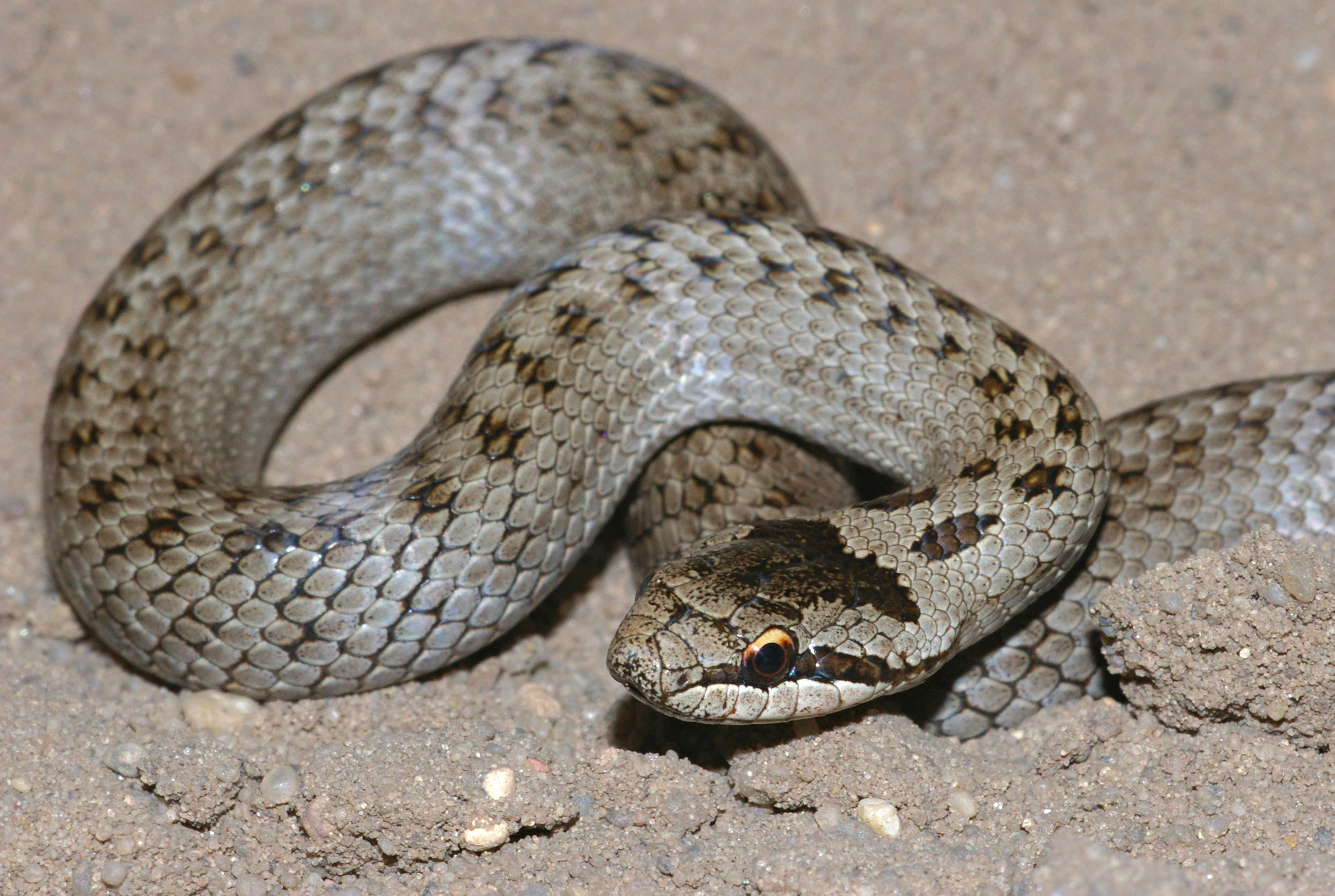
Coronella austriaca (smooth snake)

- Aeluroglena Boulenger, 1898
- Aprosdoketophis Wallach, Lanza & Nistri, 2010
- Archelaphe Schulz, Böhme & Tillack, 2011
- Argyrogena Werner, 1924
- Arizona Kennicott, 1859
- Bamanophis Schätti & Trape, 2008
- Bogertophis Dowling & Price, 1988
- Boiga Fitzinger, 1826
- Cemophora Cope, 1860
- Chapinophis Campbell & Smith, 1998
- Chironius Fitzinger, 1826
- Coelognathus Fitzinger, 1843
- Coluber Linnaeus, 1758
- Colubroelaps Orlov, Kharin, Ananjeva, Thien Tao & Quang Truong, 2009
- Conopsis Günther, 1858
- Coronella Laurenti, 1768
- Crotaphopeltis Fitzinger, 1843
- Dasypeltis Wagler, 1830
- Dendrophidion Fitzinger, 1843
- Dipsadoboa Günther, 1858
- Dispholidus Duvernoy, 1832
- Dolichophis Gistel, 1868
- Drymarchon Fitzinger, 1843
- Drymobius Fitzinger, 1843
- Drymoluber Amaral, 1929
- Eirenis Jan, 1862
- Elachistodon Reinhardt, 1863—subsumed by Boiga
- Elaphe Fitzinger in Wagler, 1833
- Euprepiophis Fitzinger, 1843
- Ficimia Gray, 1849
- Geagras Cope, 1876
- Gonyosoma Wagler, 1828
- Gyalopion Cope, 1860
- Hapsidophrys Fischer, 1856
- Hemerophis Schätti & Utiger, 2001
- Hemorrhois Boie, 1826
- Hierophis Fitzinger, 1843
- Lampropeltis Fitzinger, 1843
- Leptodrymus Amaral, 1927
- Leptophis Bell, 1825
- Liopeltis Fitzinger, 1843
- Lycodon Fitzinger, 1826
- Lytorhynchus Peters, 1862
- Macroprotodon Guichenot, 1850
- Masticophis Baird & Girard, 1853
- Mastigodryas Amaral, 1935
- Meizodon Fischer, 1856
- Mopanveldophis Figueroa et al., 2016
- Muhtarophis Avcı, Ilgaz, Rajabizadeh, Yılmaz, Üzüm, Adriaens, Kumlutaş & Olgun, 2015
- Oligodon Fitzinger, 1826
- Oocatochus Helfenberger, 2001
- Opheodrys Fitzinger, 1843
- Oreocryptophis Utiger, Schätti & Helfenberger, 2005
- Orientocoluber Kharin, 2011
- Oxybelis Wagler, 1830
- Palusophis
- Pantherophis Fitzinger, 1843
- Persiophis Rajabizadeh, Pyron, Nazarov, Poyarkov, Adriaens, & Herrel, 2020
- Philothamnus Smith, 1840
- Phrynonax Cope, 1862
- Phyllorhynchus Stejneger, 1890
- Pituophis Holbrook, 1842
- Platyceps Blyth, 1860
- Pseudelaphe Mertens & Rosenberg, 1943
- Pseudoficimia Bocourt, 1883
- Ptyas Fitzinger, 1843
- Rhamnophis Günther, 1862
- Rhinobothryum Wagler, 1830
- Rhinocheilus Baird & Girard, 1853
- Rhynchocalamus Günther, 1864
- Salvadora Baird & Girard, 1853
- Scaphiophis Peters, 1870
- Scolecophis Fitzinger, 1843
- Senticolis Campbell & Howell, 1965
- Simophis Peters, 1860
- Sonora Baird & Girard, 1843
- Spalerosophis Jan, 1865
- Spilotes Wagler, 1830
- Stegonotus Duméril, Bibron & Duméril, 1854
- Stenorrhina Duméril, 1853
- Stichophanes Wang, Messenger, Zhao & Zhu, 2014
- Symphimus Cope, 1869
- Sympholis Cope, 1861
- Tantilla Baird & Girard, 1853
- Tantillita Smith, 1941
- Telescopus Wagler, 1830
- Thelotornis Smith, 1849
- Thrasops Hallowell, 1857
- Toxicodryas Hallowell, 1857
- Trimorphodon Cope, 1861
- Wallaceophis Mirza, Vyas, Patel & Sanap, 2016
- Wallophis Werner, 1929
- Xenelaphis Günther, 1864
- Xyelodontophis Broadley & Wallach, 2002
- Yakacoatl Cisneros-Bernal et al., 2025
- Zamenis Wagler, 1830

A group of 4 genera historically placed in Colubrinae have recently been called a separate subfamily, Ahaetuliinae, in a few analyses. These are Ahaetulla Link, 1807, Chrysopelea Boie, 1827, Dendrelaphis Boulenger, 1890, and Dryophiops Boulenger, 1896.
