= Micrurus gallicus =

Micrurus gallicus Temporal range: 20–11.1 Ma

Scientific classification
- Kingdom: Animalia
- Phylum: Chordata
- Class: Reptilia
- Order: Squamata
- Suborder: Serpentes
- Family: Elapidae
- Genus: Micrurus
- Species: †M. gallicus

Binomial name
- †Micrurus gallicus Rage & Holman, 1984

Species of extinct coral snake

Micrurus gallicus is an extinct species of coral snake in the family Elapidae. The species lived in France and Germany from 20 to 11.1 million years ago. The remains of this snake consist of some vertebrae. The locality in which it was found was an MN 7 + 8 fissure fill in France called La Grive M, dating from the late Middle Miocene.

Another fossil consisting of a single precaudal vertebra, attributed to Micrurus cf. gallicus, was found near Griesbeckerzell, a parish village in Aichach, Bavaria, Germany. It lived with two species in the genus Naja, Naja romani and Naja depereti. It also likely lived with snakes of the genera Mionatrix of the family Colubridae and Palaeopython of the family Messelopythonidae.
