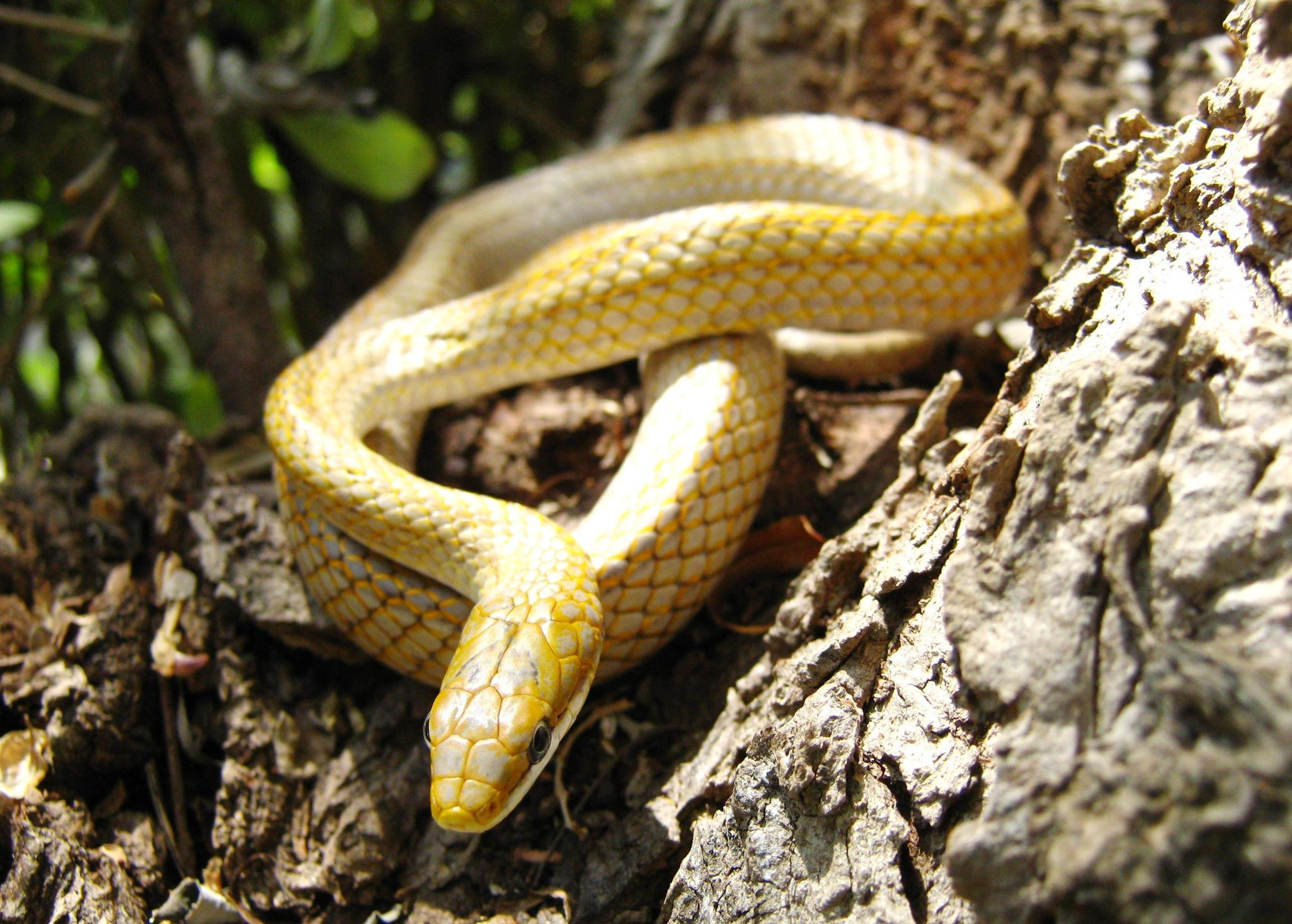

Conservation status
- Least Concern (IUCN 3.1)

Scientific classification
- Kingdom: Animalia
- Phylum: Chordata
- Class: Reptilia
- Order: Squamata
- Suborder: Serpentes
- Family: Colubridae
- Genus: Symphimus
- Species: S. mayae

Binomial name
- Symphimus mayae (Gaige, 1936)

Synonyms
- Eurypholis mayae Gaige, 1936; Entichinus mayae (Gaige, 1936); Opheodrys mayae (Gaige, 1936)

= Symphimus mayae =

Species of snake

Symphimus mayae, also known commonly as the Yucatán white-lipped snake and la culebra labio-blanco yucateca in New World Spanish, is a species of snake in the subfamily Colubrinae of the family Colubridae. The species is native to the Yucatán Peninsula.

== Etymology ==
The specific name, mayae, is in honor of the Maya, an indigenous people of the Yucatán Peninsula.

== Geographic distribution ==
Symphimus mayae is found in Belize, Guatemala, and Mexico (Campeche, Quintana Roo, Yucatán).

== Habitat ==
The preferred natural habitat of Symphimus mayae is forest, at altitudes from sea level to 300 m (980 ft).

== Behavior ==
Symphimus mayae is both terrestrial and semiarboreal, and it is diurnal.

== Diet ==
Symphimus mayae preys predominately upon orthopterans such as crickets (family Gryllidae) and katydids (family Tettigoniidae).

== Reproduction ==
Symphimus mayae is oviparous.
