= Hydrablabes praefrontalis =

Conservation status
- Data Deficient (IUCN 3.1)

Scientific classification
- Kingdom: Animalia
- Phylum: Chordata
- Class: Reptilia
- Order: Squamata
- Suborder: Serpentes
- Family: Colubridae
- Genus: Hydrablabes
- Species: H. praefrontalis

Binomial name
- Hydrablabes praefrontalis (Mocquard, 1890)

Species of snake

Mocquard's small-eyed snake (Hydrablabes praefrontalis) is a terrestrial species of natricine snake found in forests in Malaysia, Indonesia, and Brunei.
