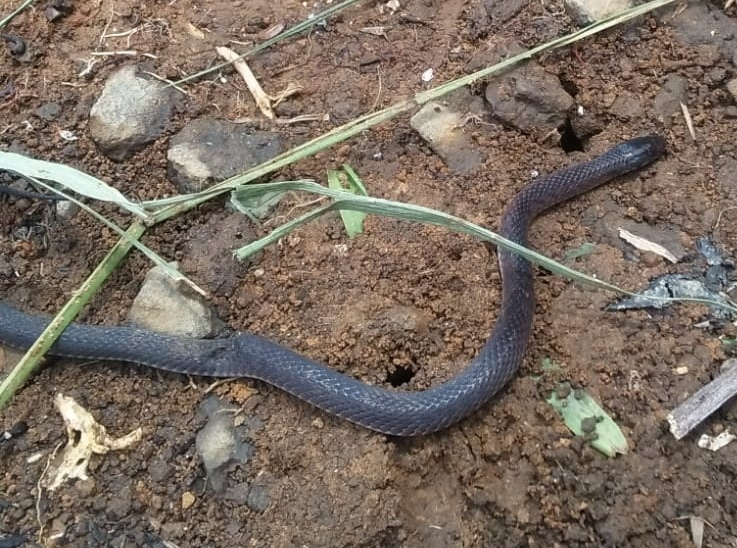

Conservation status
- Least Concern (IUCN 3.1)

Scientific classification
- Kingdom: Animalia
- Phylum: Chordata
- Class: Reptilia
- Order: Squamata
- Suborder: Serpentes
- Family: Colubridae
- Genus: Elapoidis
- Species: E. fusca

Binomial name
- Elapoidis fusca (Boie, 1826)

Synonyms
- Elapodis fuscus; Calamaria elapoides; Elaphis sumatranus

= Dark grey ground snake =

Species of snake

The dark grey ground snake (Elapoidis fusca) is a snake endemic to Indonesia and Malaysia.
