= Hydrablabes periops =

Conservation status
- Least Concern (IUCN 3.1)

Scientific classification
- Kingdom: Animalia
- Phylum: Chordata
- Class: Reptilia
- Order: Squamata
- Suborder: Serpentes
- Family: Colubridae
- Genus: Hydrablabes
- Species: H. periops

Binomial name
- Hydrablabes periops (Günther, 1872)

Species of snake

The olive small-eyed snake (Hydrablabes periops) is a species of natricine snake found in Malaysia, Indonesia, and Brunei.
