= Elapoidis sumatrana =

Scientific classification
- Kingdom: Animalia
- Phylum: Chordata
- Class: Reptilia
- Order: Squamata
- Suborder: Serpentes
- Family: Colubridae
- Genus: Elapoidis
- Species: E. sumatrana

Binomial name
- Elapoidis sumatrana Bleeker, 1860

Species of snake

Elapoidis sumatrana is a species of snake of the family Colubridae.

The snake is found in Indonesia.
