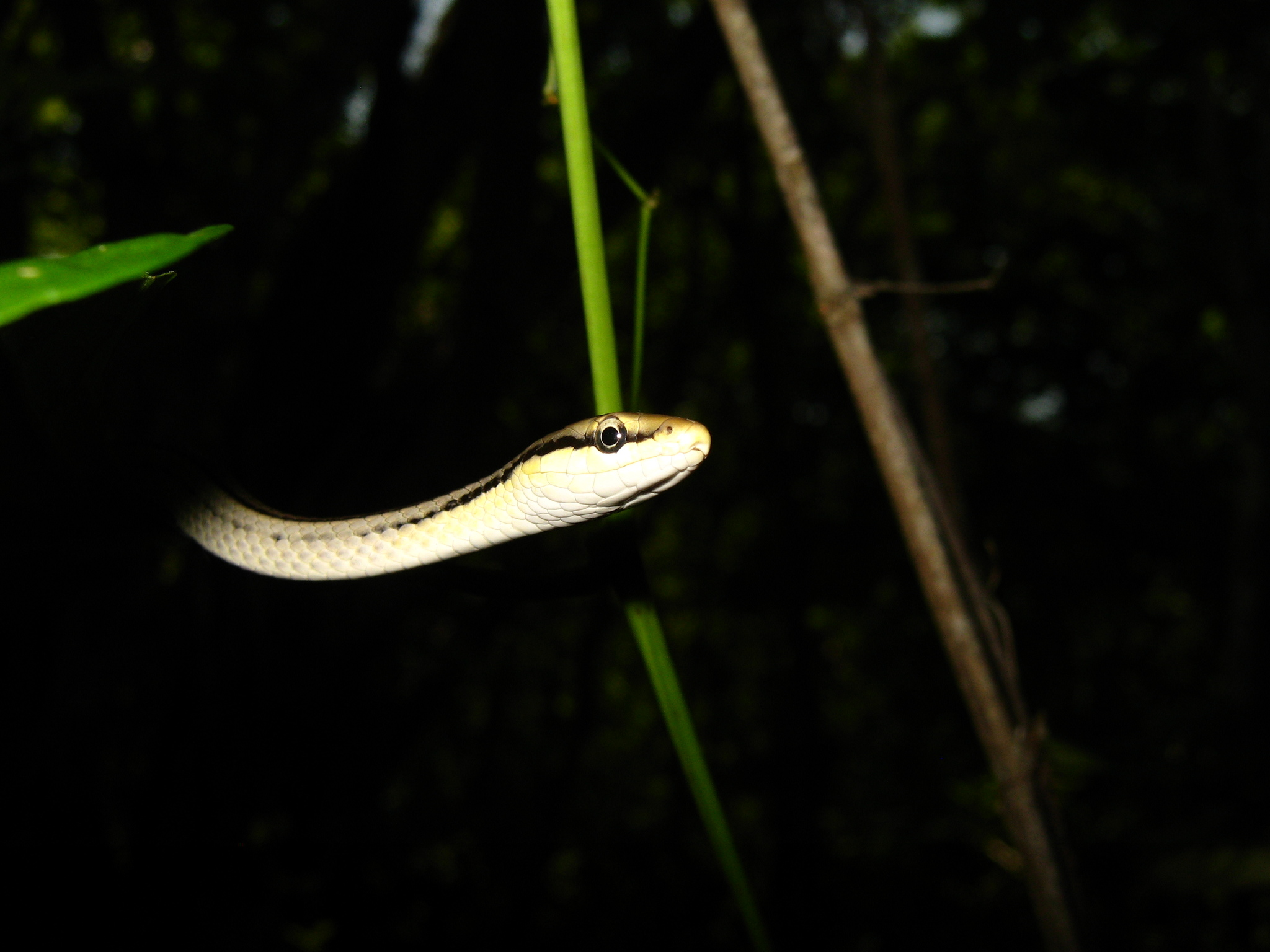

Conservation status
- Least Concern (IUCN 3.1)

Scientific classification
- Kingdom: Animalia
- Phylum: Chordata
- Class: Reptilia
- Order: Squamata
- Suborder: Serpentes
- Family: Colubridae
- Genus: Symphimus
- Species: S. leucostomus

Binomial name
- Symphimus leucostomus Cope, 1869

= Symphimus leucostomus =

Species of snake

Symphimus leucostomus, the Mexican white-lipped snake, is a species of snake of the family Colubridae.

The snake is found in Mexico. .
