= Vine snake =

Vine snake are arboreal species of snakes that are often likened to vines due to their thin, elongate shape and/or coloration. The term can refer to several genera of snake in the taxonomic family Colubridae, including:

- Ahaetulla, a genus of Asiatic vine snakes
- Chironius, a Neotropical genus sometimes called vine snake
- Imantodes, a Neotropical genus known as blunt-headed vine snakes
- Oxybelis, a Neotropical genus of vine snakes
- Thelotornis, a genus of African vine snakes also known as twig snakes
- Uromacer, a genus of Hispaniolan vine snakes
