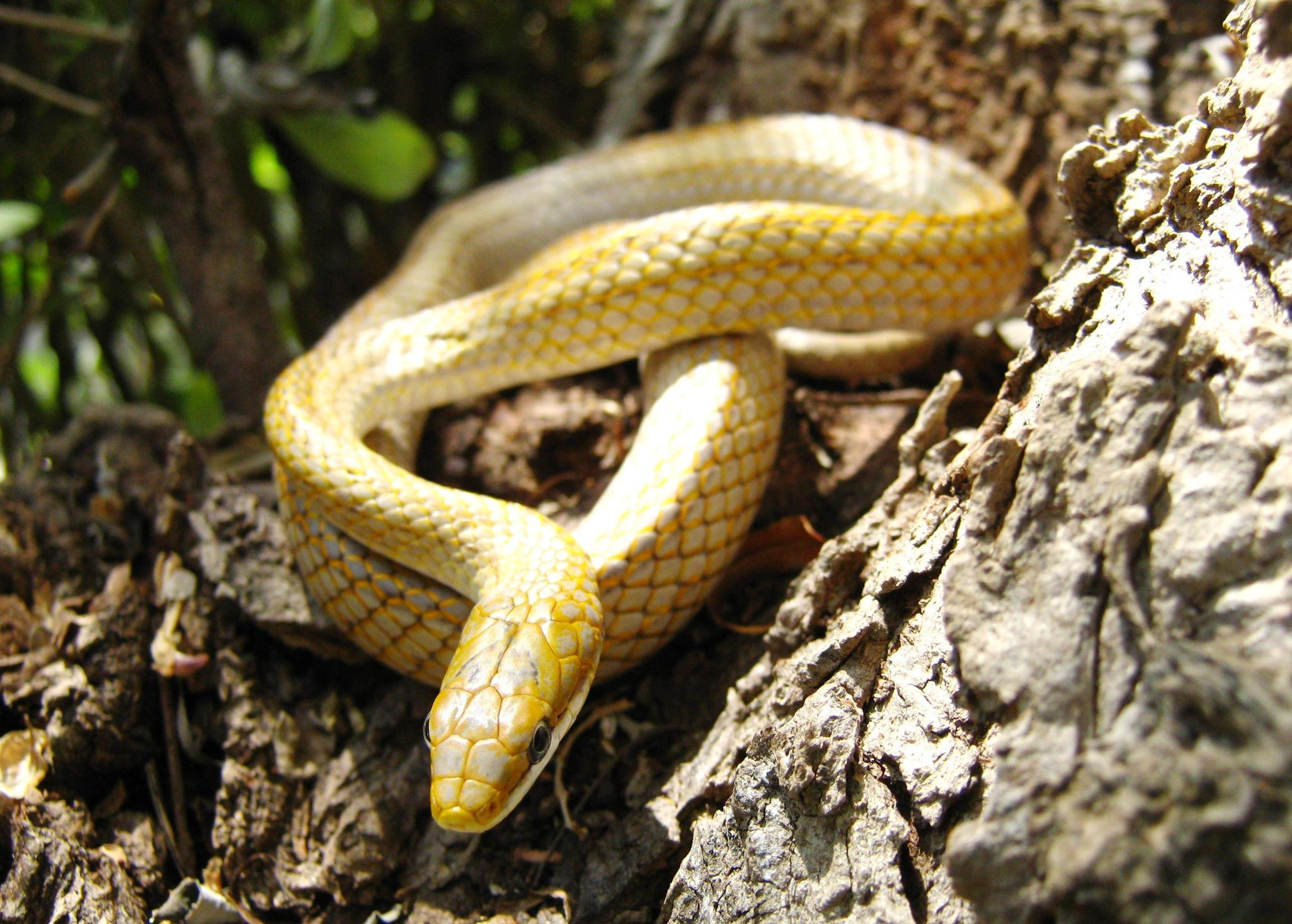
- Symphimus mayae, in a tree, in Yucatán, Mexico

Scientific classification
- Kingdom: Animalia
- Phylum: Chordata
- Class: Reptilia
- Order: Squamata
- Suborder: Serpentes
- Family: Colubridae
- Subfamily: Colubrinae
- Genus: Symphimus; Cope, 1869

= Symphimus =

Genus of snakes

Symphimus is a genus of snakes in the family Colubridae. The genus is native to Mexico and Central America.

== Species and geographic ranges ==
The following two species are recognized as being valid.

- Symphimus leucostomus Cope, 1869 –Mexican white-lipped snake, southeastern Mexico (Chiapas, Jalisco, Oaxaca)
- Symphimus mayae (Gaige, 1936) – Yucatán white-lipped snake, northern Belize, Guatemala, Mexico (Campeche, Quintana Roo, Yucatán)

== Reproduction ==
Snakes of the genus Symphimus are oviparous.
