= Muhtarophis =

Muhtarophis barani

Conservation status
- Data Deficient (IUCN 3.1)

Scientific classification
- Kingdom: Animalia
- Phylum: Chordata
- Class: Reptilia
- Order: Squamata
- Suborder: Serpentes
- Family: Colubridae
- Genus: Muhtarophis; Avci et al., 2015
- Species: M. barani

Binomial name
- Muhtarophis barani (Olgun, Avci, Ilgaz, Üzüm & Yilmaz, 2007)

Synonyms
- Rhynchocalamus barani Olgun, Avci, Ilgaz, Üzüm & Yilmaz, 2007; Rhynchocalamus barani — Wallach et al. 2014; Muhtarophis barani — Avci et al. 2015; Muhtarophis barani — Šmíd et al. 2015

Species of snake

Muhtarophis barani, also known commonly as Baran's black-headed dwarf snake, is a species of snake in the monotypic genus Muhtarophis in the subfamily Colubrinae of the family Colubridae. The species is endemic to the Amanos Mountains of Turkey, and was discovered in 2007.

== Etymology ==
The generic name, Muhtarophis, is in honor of Turkish herpetologist Muhtar Başoğlu (with the suffix -ophis meaning "snake").

The specific name, barani, is in honor of Turkish herpetologist İbrahim Baran of the Dokuz Eylül University, İzmir.

== Habitat ==
The preferred natural habitats of M. barani are shrubland and rocky areas, at an altitude of 1,300 m (4,300 ft).

== Description ==
M. barani has 17 dorsal scale rows at midbody, and 163–173 ventral scales. The head is oblique-shaped anteriorly. There is a distinctive black blotch under the eye, running into a narrow stripe. The dorsal surface of the body is colored reddish brown, with no spots.

== Reproduction ==
M. barani is oviparous.
