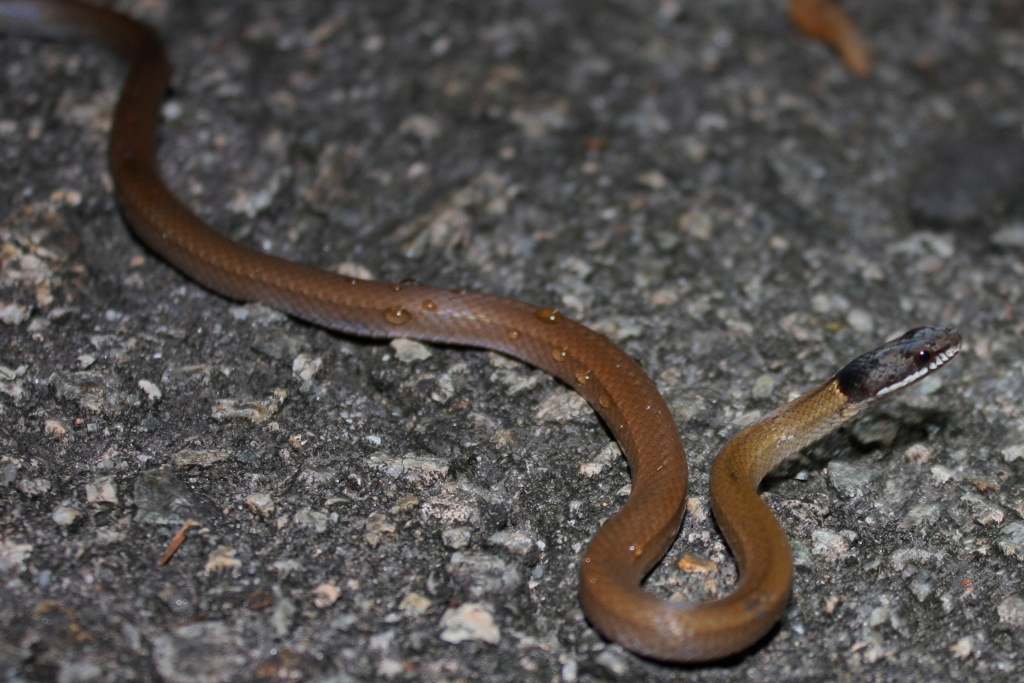
- Sibynophis chinensis

Scientific classification
- Kingdom: Animalia
- Phylum: Chordata
- Class: Reptilia
- Order: Squamata
- Suborder: Serpentes
- Family: Colubridae
- Subfamily: Sibynophiinae; Dunn, 1928

Genera
- Colubroelaps; Scaphiodontophis; Sibynophis

= Sibynophiinae =

Subfamily of snakes

Sibynophiinae is a small subfamily of colubroid snakes, sometimes referred to as a family (Sibynophiidae). This group has also been called Scaphiodontophiinae but since the name Sibynophiinae is older, it has priority. They are commonly called hinged-teeth snakes.

Sibynophiine snakes are between 30 and 100 cm in total length as adults, depending on the species. They have extremely long tails, up to half of the total length. They are non-venomous and eat mostly lizards.

These snakes possess several unique features, including numerous small, spatulate, hinged maxillary teeth, a specialization that allows grasping and feeding on hard-bodied prey such as skinks, and the presence of fracture planes between caudal vertebrae that allow them to easily break parts of their tails in a fashion similar to many lizards (although they cannot regrow their tails). Scaphiodontophis are also unusual in being partial coral snake mimics: the front and sometimes the rear parts of their bodies are black, white, and red banded, whereas the middle of the body sometimes down to the tail is brown. The pattern of colors is highly variable, even within the same individual snake, and does not necessarily correspond to the patterns of any species of coral snakes, unlike the banding patterns of most coral snake mimics. No two individual Scaphiodontophis have exactly the same coloration on the entire body.

The geographic distribution of sibynophiine snakes is puzzling because it is disjunct, with one genus in the Neotropics and the other in Asia. Molecular data suggest that this pattern is caused by a late Eocene/Oligocene origin in Asia, followed by dispersal over the Bering land bridge to the New World. Unlike other snake groups (e.g. Crotalinae, Colubrinae, Natricinae, Dipsadinae), however, sibynophiines evidently left no extant species in temperate North America. It is likely that sibynophiines became extinct in temperate Asia and North America as the tropics receded to their current latitudes. The two genera likely last shared a common ancestor around 33 million years ago (95% HPD: 40.0–22.9 mya), at which time all the continents were in or near their current relative positions and the climate in the Bering land bridge was warmer. Less likely alternatives include dispersal over a Greenland–Faeroe land bridge, which was colder and probably had less suitable habitat for snakes at the time, or rafting from Southeast Asia to Central America, which, although not impossible, would be unprecedented among vertebrates.

The genus Liophidium, which also has hinged teeth and is found in Madagascar, was once thought to be closely related to sibynophiines, but is now known to be part of the Lamprophiidae.

== Genera ==
The subfamily Sibynophiinae contains 2 genera and 11 total species.

- Scaphiodontophis Taylor & Smith, 1943, or Neotropical neckband snakes, with 2 species, found from Mexico to Colombia
- Sibynophis Fitzinger, 1843, or Asian black-headed snakes, with 9 species, found in southern and southeastern Asia, from south-eastern Pakistan to east-central China, including Taiwan, Hainan, Sri Lanka, and the Philippines, southeast into Indonesia west of Wallace's Line.
