= Amnisiophis =

Conservation status
- Least Concern (IUCN 3.1)

Scientific classification
- Kingdom: Animalia
- Phylum: Chordata
- Order: Squamata
- Suborder: Serpentes
- Family: Colubridae
- Genus: Amnisiophis; Abegg, Santos Jr., Costa4, Battilana, Graboski, Vianna, Azevedo1, Fagundes, Castille, Prado, Bonatto, Zaher, & Grazziotin, 2022
- Species: A. amoenus

Binomial name
- Amnisiophis amoenus (Jan, 1863)

Species of snake

Amnisiophis amoenus is a species of snake of the family Colubridae.

== Distribution ==
The species is endemic to Brazil.
