= Archelaphe =

Conservation status
- Least Concern (IUCN 3.1)

Scientific classification
- Kingdom: Animalia
- Phylum: Chordata
- Class: Reptilia
- Order: Squamata
- Suborder: Serpentes
- Family: Colubridae
- Subfamily: Colubrinae
- Genus: Archelaphe; Schulz, Wolfgang Böhme (zoologist) & Tillack, 2011
- Species: A. bella

Binomial name
- Archelaphe bella (Stanley, 1917)

Synonyms
- Coluber leonardi Wall, 1921; Coronella bella Stanley, 1917; Elaphe leonardi (Wall, 1921); Elaphe leonardi subsp. chapaensis Bourret, 1934; Elaphe leonardi subsp. leonardi Wall, 1921; Maculophis bella (Stanley, 1917); Maculophis bella subsp. chapaensis (Bourret, 1934)

Genus of snakes

Archelaphe is a genus of snake in the family Colubridae. The genus contains the sole species Archelaphe bella, commonly known as the Bella rat snake, which is endemic to Asia.

== Geographic range ==
A. bella is found in China, India, Myanmar, and Vietnam.

== Description ==
The dorsal pattern of A. bella resembles that of the North American corn snake (Pantherophis guttatus). The longest specimen of A. bella measured by M.A. Smith (1943) was a male with a total length of 81 cm (32 in) which included a tail 12.5 cm (4.9 in) long.

== Reproduction ==
A. bella is oviparous.

== Subspecies ==
Two subspecies are recognized as being valid, including the nominotypical subspecies.

- Archelaphe bella bella (Stanley, 1917)
- Archelaphe bella chapaensis (Bourret, 1934)

Nota bene: A trinomial authority in parentheses indicates that the subspecies was originally described in a genus other than Archelaphe.
