= Hydrablabes =

Scientific classification
- Kingdom: Animalia
- Phylum: Chordata
- Class: Reptilia
- Order: Squamata
- Suborder: Serpentes
- Family: Colubridae
- Subfamily: Natricinae
- Genus: Hydrablabes; Boulenger, 1891

Genus of snakes

Hydrablabes is a genus of snakes in the subfamily Natricinae of the family Colubridae. The genus contains two species.

== Geographic range ==
Both species of the genus Hydrablabes are endemic to Borneo.

== Species ==
The following two species are recognized as being valid.

- Hydrablabes periops (Günther, 1872) — olive small-eyed snake
- Hydrablabes praefrontalis (Mocquard, 1890) — Mocquard's small-eyed snake

Nota bene: A binomial authority in parentheses indicates that the species was originally described in a genus other than Hydrablabes.
