= Elapoidis =

Scientific classification
- Kingdom: Animalia
- Phylum: Chordata
- Class: Reptilia
- Order: Squamata
- Suborder: Serpentes
- Family: Colubridae
- Genus: Elapoidis; Boie, 1827

Genus of snakes

Elapoidis is a genus of snakes endemic to Indonesia and Malaysia.

== Species ==
- Elapoidis fusca (Boie, 1826) - dark grey ground snake
- Elapoidis sumatrana (Bleeker, 1860)
