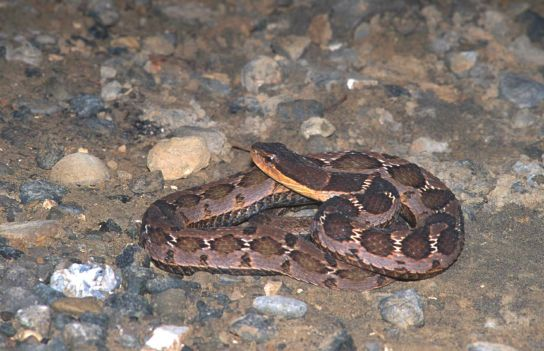
- from Taiwan

Conservation status
- Least Concern (IUCN 3.1)

Scientific classification
- Kingdom: Animalia
- Phylum: Chordata
- Class: Reptilia
- Order: Squamata
- Suborder: Serpentes
- Family: Colubridae
- Genus: Pseudagkistrodon; Van Denburgh, 1909
- Species: P. rudis

Binomial name
- Pseudagkistrodon rudis (Boulenger, 1906)

Synonyms
- Macropisthodon rudis Boulenger, 1906; Pseudoagkistrodon carinatus Van Denburgh, 1909; Natrix namiei Oshima, 1910; Macropisthodon rudis var. melanogaster C. Vogt, 1922

= Pseudagkistrodon =

Genus of snake

Pseudagkistrodon is a monotypic genus of snake in the subfamily Natricinae of the family Colubridae. The sole species is Pseudagkistrodon rudis, also known commonly as the red keelback, the false habu, and the false viper. It is found in southwest, south, and east China and in Taiwan. One subspecies, Pseudagkistrodon rudis multiprefrontalis (Zhao & Jiang, 1981) from Sichuan is recognized as being valid, in addition to the nominotypical subspecies.

== Description ==
Pseudagkistrodon rudis appears to mimic vipers, and the head takes a triangular shape when the snake takes a defensive position.

The species grows to 120 cm (47 in) in total length (tail included). The head is broad and distinct from the neck. The dorsum is brown to grey brown, sometimes tinted with bronze, and interrupted by dark markings which are variable in size, disposition, and intensity of pigmentation.

== Reproduction ==
Female Pseudagkistrodon rudis give birth to 12–27 young per litter in late summer and autumn. The newly hatched young measure 13–20 cm (5.1–7.9 in) cm in total length.

== Habitat ==
Pseudagkistrodon rudis is a common species that inhabits montane meadows, riparian areas of brooks, valleys, road sides, shrubs, and rock piles. Its altitudinal range is 600–2,650 m (1,970–8,690 ft) above sea level.

== Conservation ==
The species Pseudagkistrodon rudis is traded in significant numbers, which might present a localized threat. However, the overall population of this widespread species is stable and its conservation status is assessed as "Least Concern".
