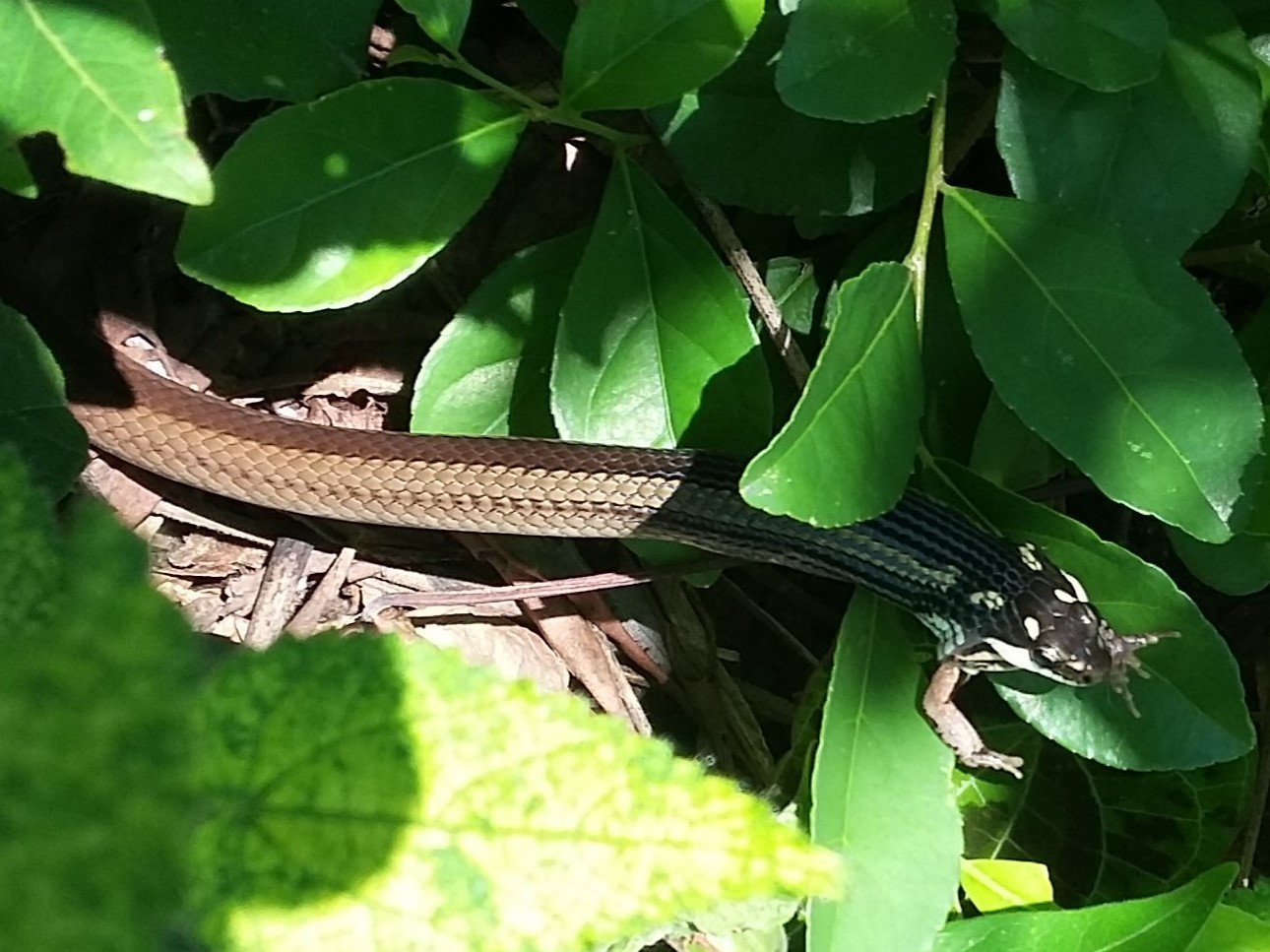
- Eating a fleshbelly frog

Conservation status
- Data Deficient (IUCN 3.1)

Scientific classification
- Kingdom: Animalia
- Phylum: Chordata
- Class: Reptilia
- Order: Squamata
- Suborder: Serpentes
- Family: Colubridae
- Genus: Baliodryas; Zaher & Prudente, 2019
- Species: B. steinbachi

Binomial name
- Baliodryas steinbachi (Boulenger, 1905)

Synonyms
- Rhadinæa Steinbachi Boulenger, 1905; Aporophis melanocephalus Griffin, 1915; Liophis steinbachi Amaral, 1929; Erythrolamprus steinbachi — Grazziotin et al., 2012; Rhadinaea steinbachi Wallach et al., 2014; Eutrachelophis steinbachi Myers & McDowell, 2014; Baliodryas steinbachi Zaher & Prudente

= Baliodryas =

Baliodryas steinbachi

Genus of snakes

Baliodryas is a genus of snakes in the family Colubridae. It is monotypic, being represented by the single species, Baliodryas steinbachi. It is endemic to South America.

== Etymology ==
The specific name, steinbachi is in honor of Dr. Jose Steinbach (1856–1929), who collected biological specimens in South America.

== Distribution and habitat ==
B. steinbachi is found in Bolivia and Brazil. The preferred natural habitat is forest at an altitude of 250 m (820 ft).

== Biology ==
B. steinbachi is oviparous.
