= Palaeonatrix =

Palaeonatrix Temporal range: Miocene

Scientific classification
- Domain: Eukaryota
- Kingdom: Animalia
- Phylum: Chordata
- Class: Reptilia
- Order: Squamata
- Suborder: Serpentes
- Family: Colubridae
- Genus: †Palaeonatrix; Szyndlar, 1982

Extinct genus of snakes

Palaeonatrix is an extinct genus of colubrid snake from the Miocene epoch.

== Distribution ==
Palaeonatrix lehmani is known from Germany and Czechia.
