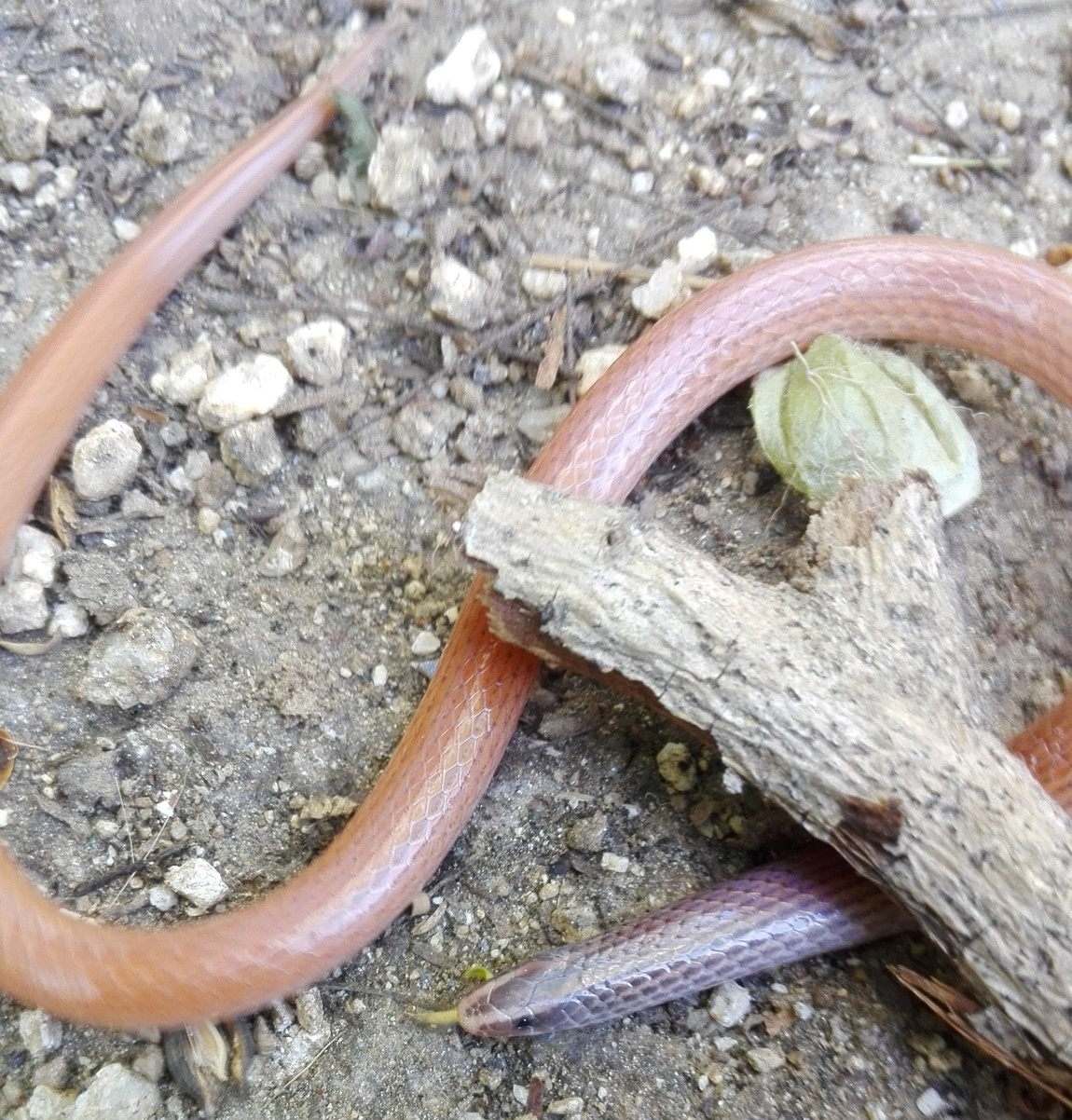

Conservation status
- Data Deficient (IUCN 3.1)

Scientific classification
- Kingdom: Animalia
- Phylum: Chordata
- Class: Reptilia
- Order: Squamata
- Suborder: Serpentes
- Family: Colubridae
- Genus: Geagras; Cope, 1876
- Species: G. redimitus

Binomial name
- Geagras redimitus Cope, 1876

Synonyms
- Sphenocalamus lineolatus; Tantilla depressa

= Tehuantepec striped snake =

Species of snake

The Tehuantepec striped snake (Geagras redimitus) is a snake endemic to Mexico.
