= Xyelodontophis =

Conservation status
- Endangered (IUCN 3.1)

Scientific classification
- Kingdom: Animalia
- Phylum: Chordata
- Class: Reptilia
- Order: Squamata
- Suborder: Serpentes
- Family: Colubridae
- Genus: Xyelodontophis; Broadley & Wallach, 2002
- Species: X. uluguruensis

Binomial name
- Xyelodontophis uluguruensis Broadley & Wallach, 2002

Genus of snakes

Xyelodontophis is a genus of snake in the family Colubridae that contains the sole species Xyelodontophis uluguruensis. It is commonly known as the dagger-tooth vine snake.

It is found in Tanzania.
