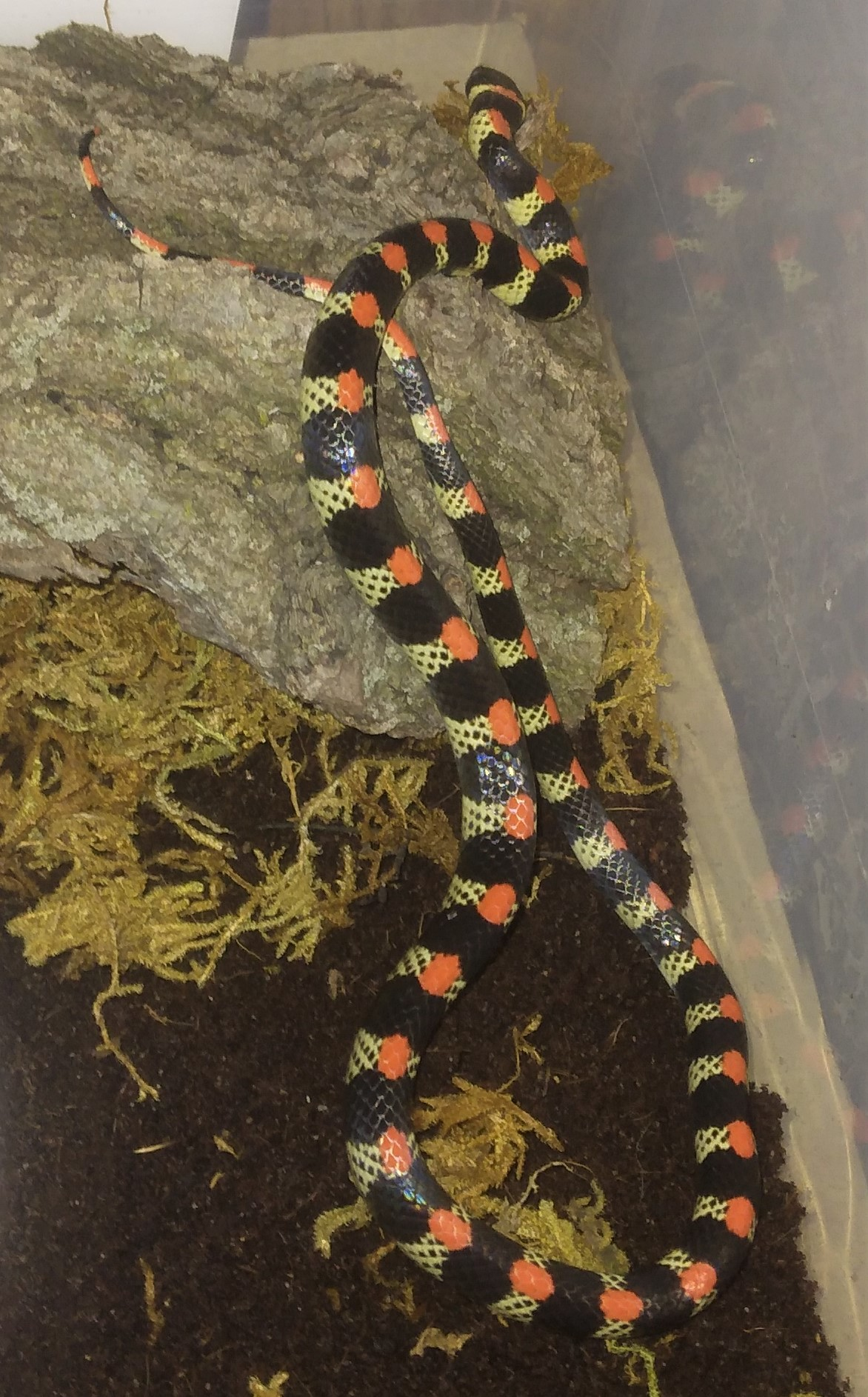

Conservation status
- Least Concern (IUCN 3.1)

Scientific classification
- Kingdom: Animalia
- Phylum: Chordata
- Class: Reptilia
- Order: Squamata
- Suborder: Serpentes
- Family: Colubridae
- Genus: Scolecophis; Fitzinger, 1843
- Species: S. atrocinctus

Binomial name
- Scolecophis atrocinctus (Schlegel, 1837)

= Scolecophis =

Genus of snakes

Scolecophis is a genus of snake in the family Colubridae that contains the sole species Scolecophis atrocinctus. Its genus name is derived from Greek: skolex meaning a worm or grub and ophis meaning snake, referring to what it likes to eat. Its species name is derived from Latin ater meaning black and cingula meaning girdle referring to its physical appearance. It is commonly known as the black-banded snake.

It is found in Central America. It ranges from Guatemala, Honduras, El Salvador, Nicaragua, and Costa Rica.

Their diet consists of invertebrates such as centipede, arachnids, worms, crickets, millipedes, and grubs.

This snake reaches a length of 18–24 in. (45–60 cm.) It is black and white banded with red spots on the white bands down their spine from head to tail. They have tiny eyes and a flat head.

There is still a lot of unknown about this species.
