= Nguyenvansang's snake =

Conservation status
- Data Deficient (IUCN 3.1)

Scientific classification
- Kingdom: Animalia
- Phylum: Chordata
- Class: Reptilia
- Order: Squamata
- Suborder: Serpentes
- Family: Colubridae
- Genus: Colubroelaps; Orlov, Kharin, Ananjeva, T.T. Nguyen & T.Q. Nguyen, 2009
- Species: C. nguyenvansangi

Binomial name
- Colubroelaps nguyenvansangi Orlov, Kharin, Ananjeva, T.T. Nguyen & T.Q. Nguyen, 2009

Species of snake

Nguyenvansang's snake (Colubroelaps nguyenvansangi) is a species of snake in the subfamily Sibynophiinae of the family Colubridae. The species is endemic to Vietnam.

== Etymology ==
The specific name, nguyenvansangi, is in honor of Vietnamese herpetologist Nguyen Van Sang.

== Taxonomy ==
As of 2024, the genus Colubroelaps contains only one other species, Colubroelaps adleri.

== Geographic range ==
Colubroelaps nguyenvansangi is found in southern Vietnam, in Bình Phước Province and Lâm Đồng Province.

== Description ==
Colubroelaps nguyenvansangi may attain a total length of 50 cm (20 in), which includes a tail about 11 cm (4.3 in) long. The head is small, roundish, and short, and is not distinct from the body. The body is very slender. The dorsal scales are in 15 rows at midbody. Dorsally, it is striped with brown and black. Ventrally, in striking contrast, it is uniform white.
