= Stichophanes =

Conservation status
- Data Deficient (IUCN 3.1)

Scientific classification
- Kingdom: Animalia
- Phylum: Chordata
- Class: Reptilia
- Order: Squamata
- Suborder: Serpentes
- Family: Colubridae
- Genus: Stichophanes; Wang, Messenger, Zhao, & Zhu, 2014
- Species: S. ningshaanensis

Binomial name
- Stichophanes ningshaanensis (Yuan, 1983)

Synonyms
- Oligodon ningshaanensis

Genus of snakes

Stichophanes is a genus of snake in the family Colubridae that contains the sole species Stichophanes ningshaanensis. It is commonly known as the Ningshaan kukri snake or Ningshan line-shaped snake.

It is found in Asia.
