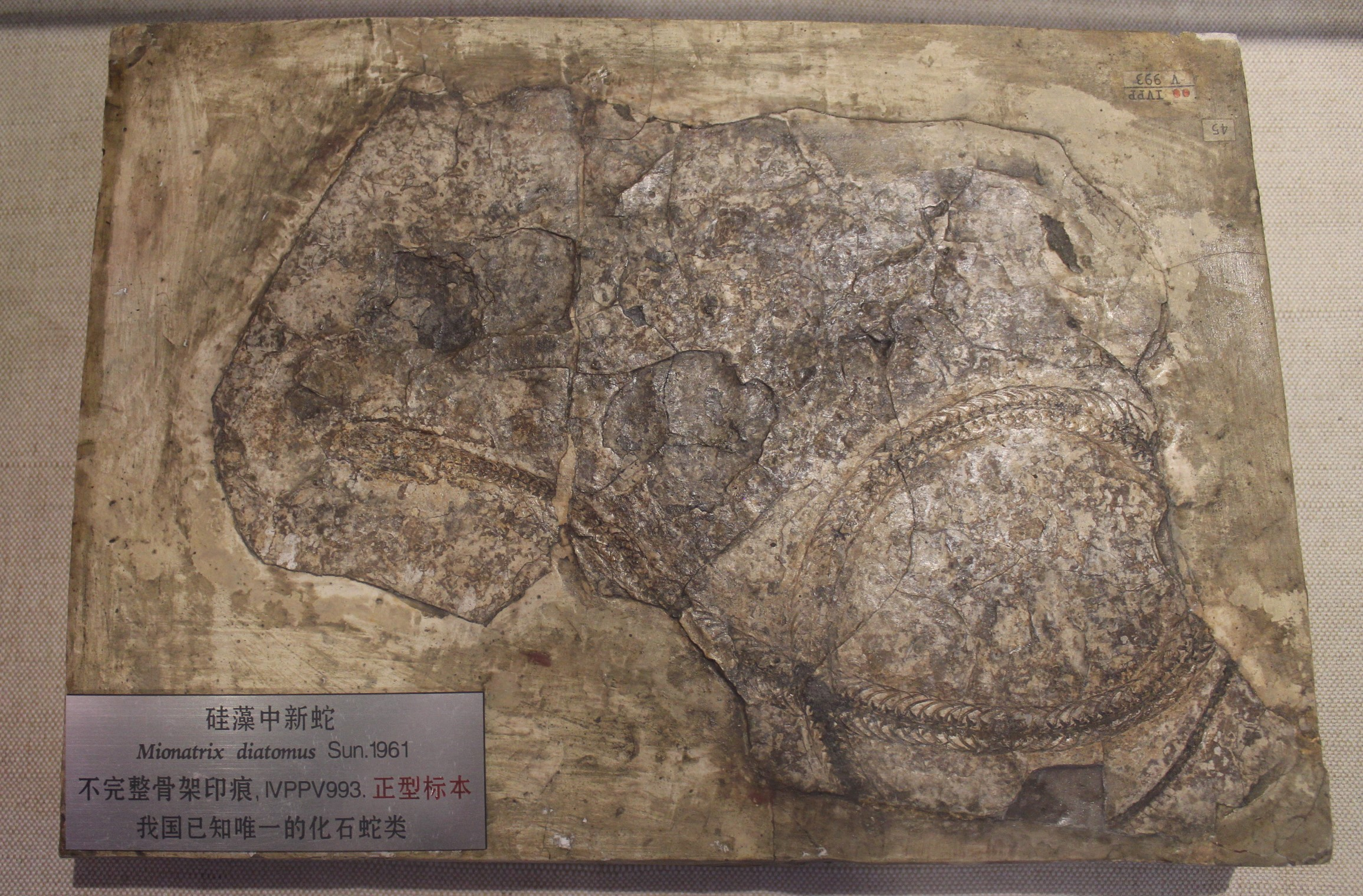
- Holotype, Paleozoological Museum of China

Scientific classification
- Domain: Eukaryota
- Kingdom: Animalia
- Phylum: Chordata
- Class: Reptilia
- Order: Squamata
- Suborder: Serpentes
- Family: Colubridae
- Genus: †Mionatrix; Sun, 1961

Species
- Mionatrix diatomus Sun 1966

= Mionatrix =

Mionatrix Temporal range: Miocene

Extinct genus of snakes

Mionatrix is an extinct genus of Colubrid snake that lived during the Miocene. Fossils have been found in Linqu, Shandong province, People's Republic of China. The type species is M. diatomus, the fossils of which are preserved in the Paleozoological Museum of China.
