= Chapinophis =

Chapinophis xanthocheilus

Conservation status
- Endangered (IUCN 3.1)

Scientific classification
- Kingdom: Animalia
- Phylum: Chordata
- Class: Reptilia
- Order: Squamata
- Suborder: Serpentes
- Family: Colubridae
- Genus: Chapinophis; Campbell & Smith, 1998
- Species: C. xanthocheilus

Binomial name
- Chapinophis xanthocheilus Campbell & Smith, 1998

Genus of snakes

Chapinophis xanthocheilus is a species of snake in the family Colubridae . It is endemic to Guatemala, and has only been found in the cloud forests of the Sierra de las Minas range. This species is the only member of the monotypic genus Chapinophis.
