= Aeluroglena =

Conservation status
- Data Deficient (IUCN 3.1)

Scientific classification
- Kingdom: Animalia
- Phylum: Chordata
- Class: Reptilia
- Order: Squamata
- Suborder: Serpentes
- Family: Colubridae
- Genus: Aeluroglena; Boulenger, 1898
- Species: A. cucullata

Binomial name
- Aeluroglena cucullata Boulenger, 1898

Genus of snakes

Aeluroglena is a genus of snake in the family Colubridae that contains the sole species Aeluroglena cucullata. It is commonly known as the Somali snake.

Aeluroglena is found in Somalia and Ethiopia.
