= La Grive M =

La Grive M is a fissure fill site in France known for the fossils of snakes and other organisms found there. The location is described as "near Saint-Alban-de-Roche, about 20 km SE of Lyon." The deposits range in age from the late Early to the late Middle Miocene.
