= Mopanveldophis =

Conservation status
- Least Concern (IUCN 3.1)

Scientific classification
- Kingdom: Animalia
- Phylum: Chordata
- Class: Reptilia
- Order: Squamata
- Suborder: Serpentes
- Family: Colubridae
- Genus: Mopanveldophis; Figueiroa, McKelvy, Grismer, Bell, & Lailvaux, 2016
- Species: M. zebrinus

Binomial name
- Mopanveldophis zebrinus (Broadley & Schätti, 2000)

Synonyms
- Coluber zebrinus; Hemerophis zebrinus

Genus of snakes

Mopanveldophis, the Cunene racer, is a genus of snake in the family Colubridae that contains the sole species Mopanveldophis zebrinus. It is found in northern Namibia.
