= Simophis =

Conservation status
- Least Concern (IUCN 3.1)

Scientific classification
- Kingdom: Animalia
- Phylum: Chordata
- Class: Reptilia
- Order: Squamata
- Suborder: Serpentes
- Family: Colubridae
- Genus: Simophis; Peters, 1860
- Species: S. rhinostoma

Binomial name
- Simophis rhinostoma (Schlegel, 1837)

Genus of snakes

Simophis is a genus of snake in the family Colubridae that contains the sole species Simophis rhinostoma. It is commonly known as the São Paulo false coral snake.

It is distributed in eastern Paraguay, and in Brazil it occurs in the western, southeastern and central regions, with its distribution range extended into the northeastern region. This species is found in Atlantic Forest and Cerrado areas.
