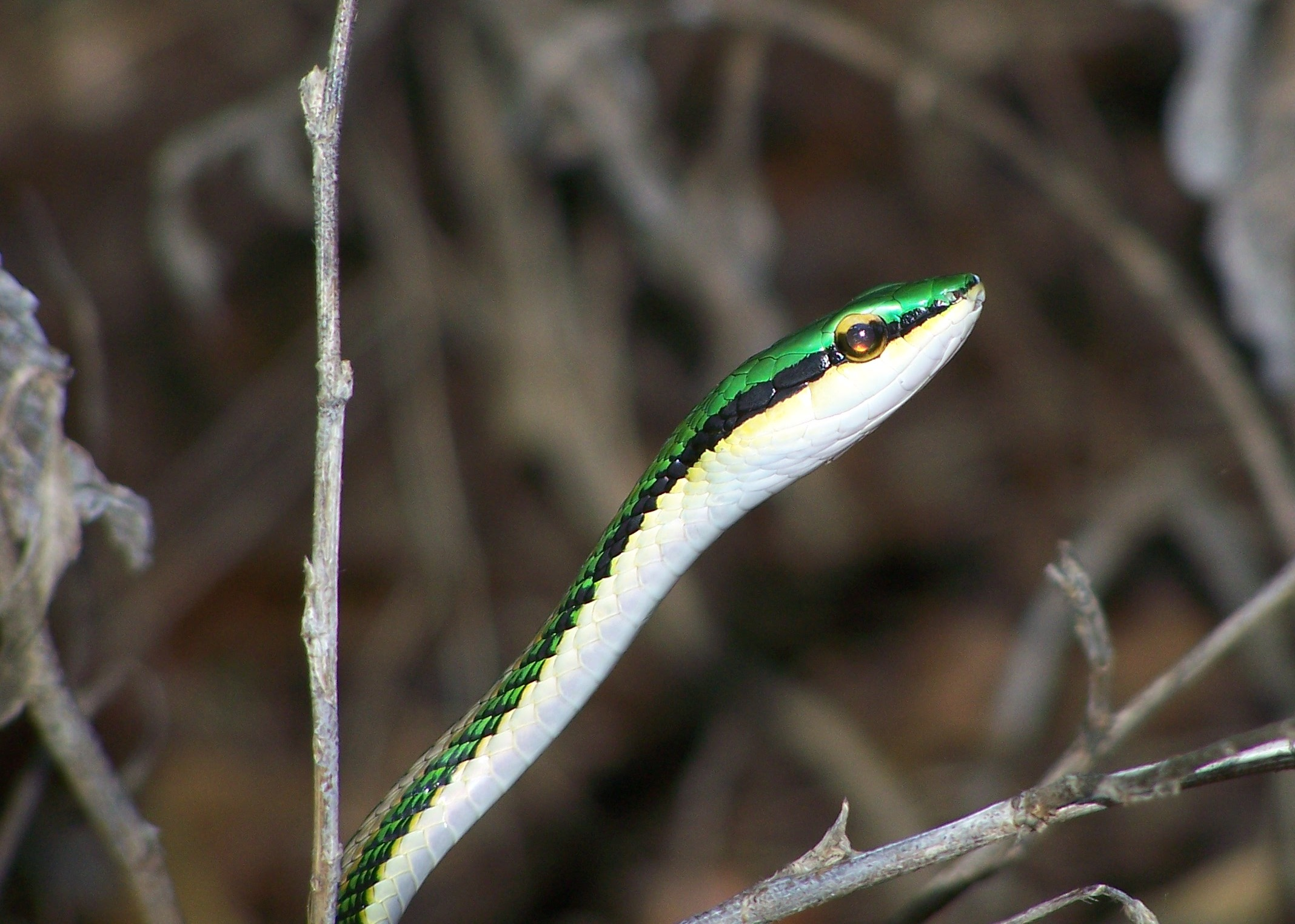

Conservation status
- Least Concern (IUCN 3.1)

Scientific classification
- Kingdom: Animalia
- Phylum: Chordata
- Class: Reptilia
- Order: Squamata
- Suborder: Serpentes
- Family: Colubridae
- Genus: Leptodrymus; Amaral, 1927
- Species: L. pucherrimus

Binomial name
- Leptodrymus pucherrimus (Cope, 1874)

= Leptodrymus =

Genus of snakes

Leptodrymus is a genus of snake in the family Colubridae that contains the sole species Leptodrymus pulcherrimus. It is known as the striped lowland snake or green-headed racer.

It is found throughout Central America, in Costa Rica, Guatemala, Nicaragua, El Salvador and Honduras.
