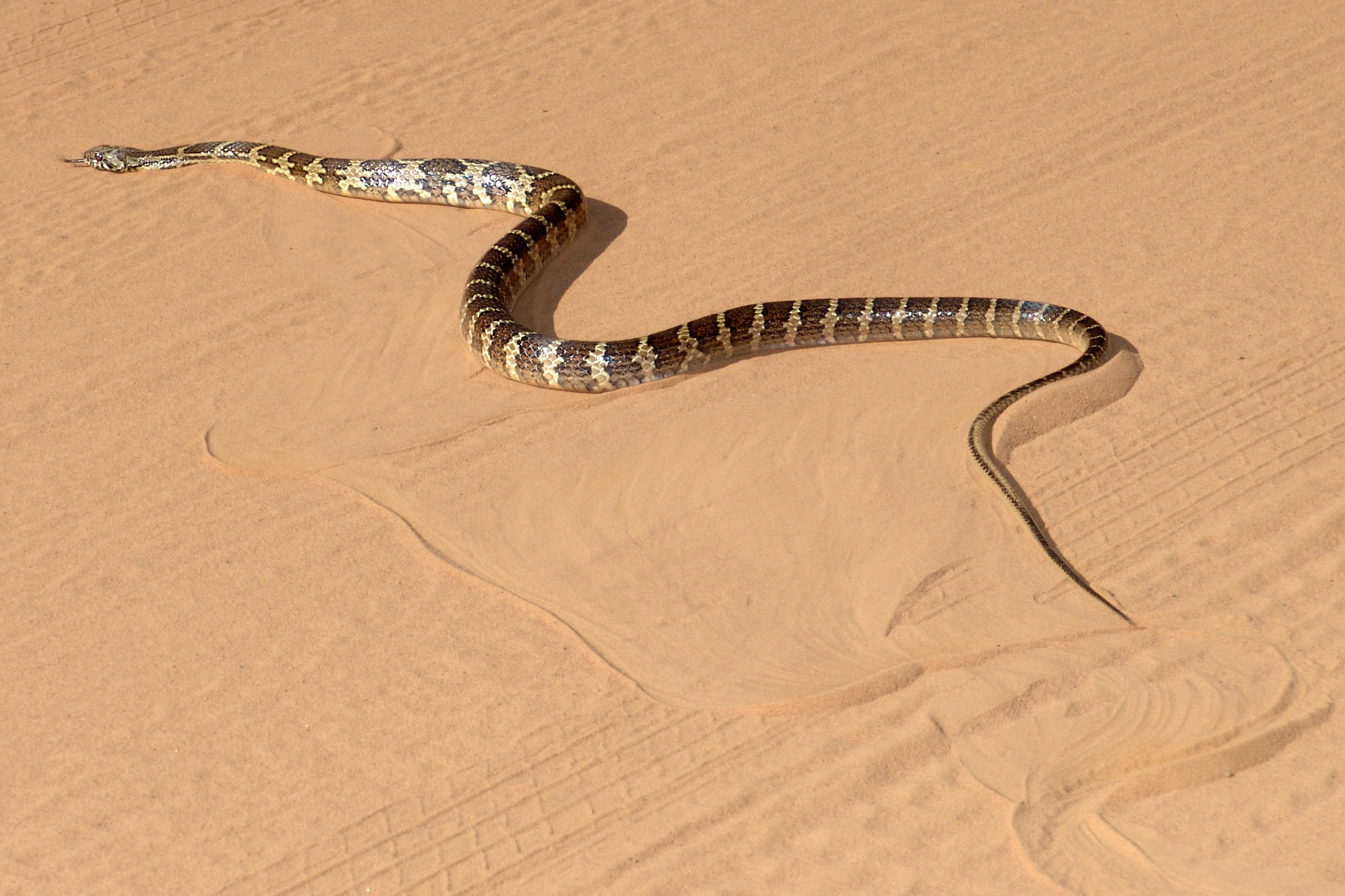

Conservation status
- Least Concern (IUCN 3.1)

Scientific classification
- Kingdom: Animalia
- Phylum: Chordata
- Class: Reptilia
- Order: Squamata
- Suborder: Serpentes
- Family: Colubridae
- Genus: Palusophis; Montingelli, Grazziotin, Battilana, Murphy, Zhang & Zaher, 2019
- Species: P. bifossatus

Binomial name
- Palusophis bifossatus (Raddi, 1820)

Synonyms
- Coluber bifossatus; Coluber capistratus; Coluber lichtensteinii; Coluber pantherinus; Ptyas pantherinus; Drymobius bifossatus; Dryadophis bifossatus; Mastigodryas bifossatus

= Palusophis =

Species of snake

Palusophis bifossatus is a species of snake of the family Colubridae.

== Geographic range ==
The snake is found in some central and central eastern parts of Brazil, Bolivia, Colombia, Paraguay, Peru, and northern Uruguay. It has the common name of Rio tropical racer. It is monotypic in the genus Palusophis.
