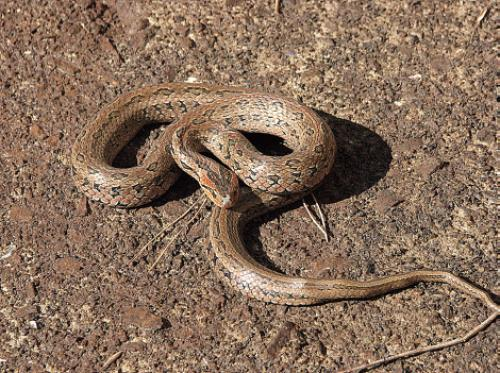

Conservation status
- Least Concern (IUCN 3.1)

Scientific classification
- Kingdom: Animalia
- Phylum: Chordata
- Class: Reptilia
- Order: Squamata
- Suborder: Serpentes
- Family: Colubridae
- Genus: Oocatochus; Helfenberger, 2001
- Species: O. rufodorsatus

Binomial name
- Oocatochus rufodorsatus (Cantor, 1842)

= Oocatochus =

Genus of snakes

Oocatochus is a genus of snake in the family Colubridae that contains the sole species Oocatochus rufodorsatus. It is known as the frog-eating rat snake, or red-backed rat snake.

It is found in East Asia, in eastern China, Korea, and Russia. The reptile database also mentions Taiwan, but other sources do not support this.
