= Persiophis =

Scientific classification
- Kingdom: Animalia
- Phylum: Chordata
- Class: Reptilia
- Order: Squamata
- Suborder: Serpentes
- Family: Colubridae
- Genus: Persiophis; Rajabizadeh, Pyron, Nazarov, Poyarkov, Adriaens, & Herrel, 2020
- Species: P. fahimii

Binomial name
- Persiophis fahimii Rajabizadeh, Pyron, Nazarov, Poyarkov, Adriaens, & Herrel, 2020

Genus of snakes

Persiophis is a genus of snake in the family Colubridae that contains the sole species Persiophis fahimii. It is commonly known as Fahimi's ground snake.

It is found in Iran.
