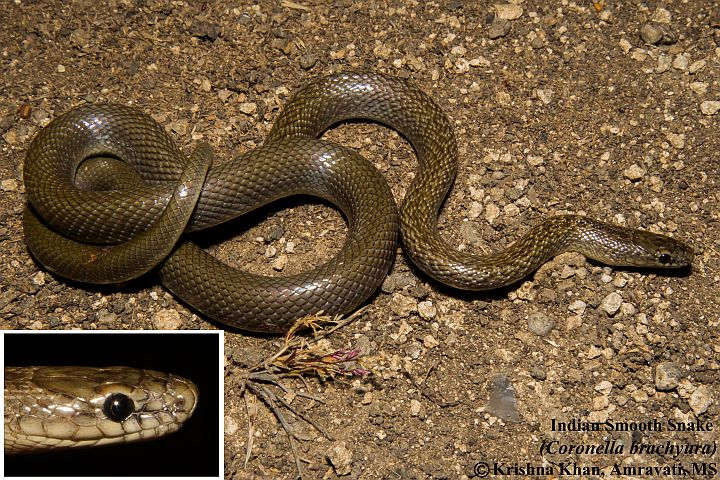
- Indian smooth snake at Amravati, Maharashtra

Conservation status
- Least Concern (IUCN 3.1)

Scientific classification
- Kingdom: Animalia
- Phylum: Chordata
- Class: Reptilia
- Order: Squamata
- Suborder: Serpentes
- Family: Colubridae
- Genus: Wallophis; Werner, 1929
- Species: W. brachyura

Binomial name
- Wallophis brachyura (Günther, 1866)
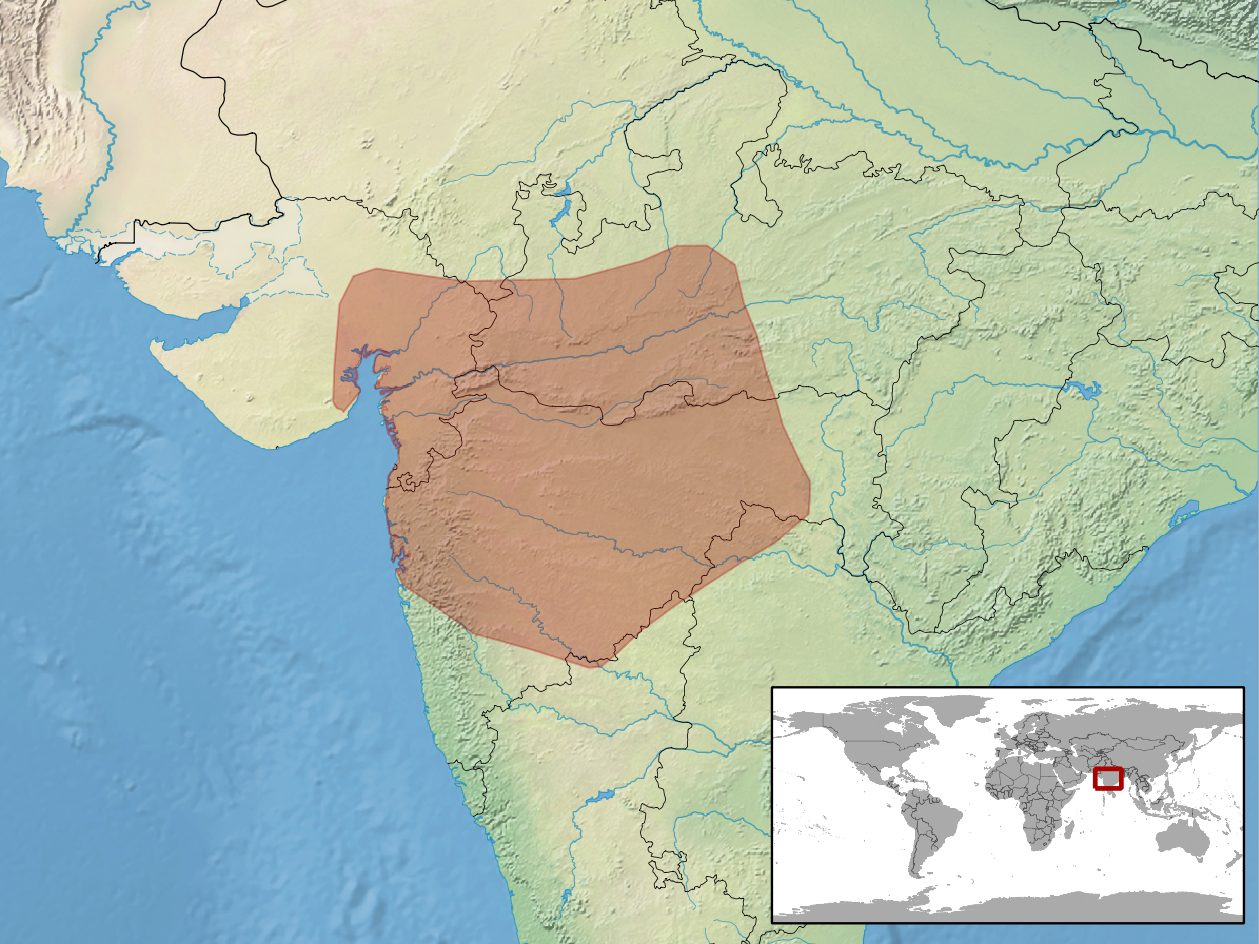

Synonyms
- Zamenis brachyurus Günther, 1866; Coronella brachyura — Boulenger, 1890

= Wallophis =

Species of snake

Wallophis brachyura, known commonly as the Indian smooth snake or suvaro saap, is a species of rare harmless snake in the family Colubridae. The species is endemic to India.

== Geographic range ==
W. brachyura is found in isolated localities in the state of Maharashtra in western peninsular India.

== Habitat ==
The preferred habitat of W. brachyura is dry plains.

== Description ==
The following description is based on Malcolm Smith (1943):

Nostril large, between two nasals; internasals 0.3 to 0.5 as long as the prefrontals; frontal nearly as broad as long, in contact with a large preocular; loreal longer than high; 2 postoculars; temporals 2+2; 8 supralabials, 4th and 5th touching the eye; anterior genials larger than the posterior, the latter separated by two or three series of small scales. Scales in 23:23:19 rows; ventrals large, rounded; tail rather short. Ventrals 200–224; Caudals 46–53; Anals 1.

Hemipenis extending to the 13th caudal plate, not forked. The distal half is calyculate, the cups being large and with scalloped edges; the proximal half is spinose, two or three spines at the base being much larger than the others (bad specimen).

Olive-brown above, with indistinct light variegations on the anterior half of the body and head; lower parts whitish. Total length: males 515 mm (20.3 in), tail 75 mm (3.0 in); females 460 mm (18 in), tail 55 mm (2.2 in).

Range. Northern India. Poona district and Visapur, near Bombay; S.E. Berar.

A rare snake.

== Diet ==
The diet of W. brachyura is unknown.

== Reproduction ==
The manner of reproduction of W. brachyura is unknown.
