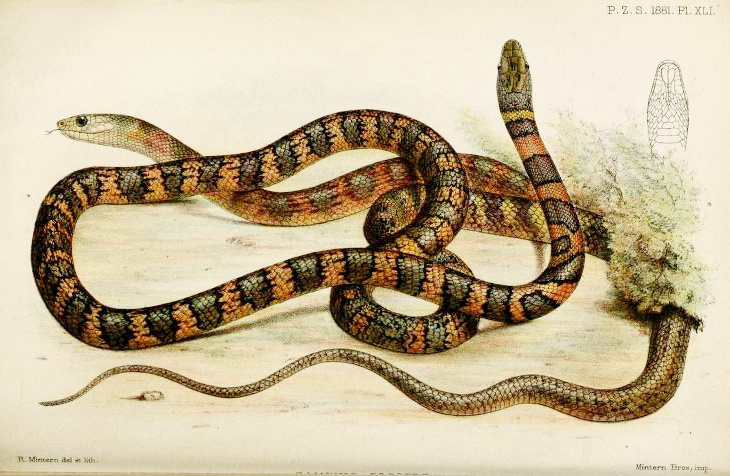

Conservation status
- Near Threatened (IUCN 3.1)

Scientific classification
- Kingdom: Animalia
- Phylum: Chordata
- Class: Reptilia
- Order: Squamata
- Suborder: Serpentes
- Family: Colubridae
- Genus: Hemerophis; Schätti & Utiger, 2001
- Species: H. socotrae

Binomial name
- Hemerophis socotrae (Günther, 1881)

= Hemerophis =

Genus of snakes

Hemerophis is a genus of snake in the family Colubridae that contains the sole species Hemerophis socotrae. It is commonly known as the Socotran racer.

It is found in Yemen.
