= Bamanophis =

Conservation status
- Least Concern (IUCN 3.1)

Scientific classification
- Kingdom: Animalia
- Phylum: Chordata
- Class: Reptilia
- Order: Squamata
- Suborder: Serpentes
- Family: Colubridae
- Genus: Bamanophis; Schätti & J.-F. Trape, 2008
- Species: B. dorri

Binomial name
- Bamanophis dorri (Lataste, 1888)

Synonyms
- Periops dorri Lataste, 1888; Zamenis dorri — Boulenger, 1893; Coluber dorri — Dekeyser & Villiers, 1954; Eremiophis dorri — Welch, 1983; Haemorrhois dorri — Mierte, 1992; Bamanophis dorri — Schätti & J.–F. Trape

Genus of snakes

Bamanophis is a genus of snake in the family Colubridae. The genus contains the sole species Bamanophis dorri, which is native to West Africa.

== Etymology ==
The specific name, dorri, is in honor of French military officer Emile Dorr (1857–1907), who collected the holotype.

== Geographic range ==
B. dorri is found in northern Benin, Burkina Faso, northern Ghana, Guinea, Mali, Mauritania, Senegal, and northern Togo.

== Habitat ==
The preferred natural habitat of B. dorri is rocky areas in savanna.

== Description ==
Dorsally, B. dorri is gray or reddish, with a series of X-shaped dark spots. Ventrally, it is yellowish white. Adults may attain a total length (including tail) of 73.5 cm (28.9 in).

== Reproduction ==
B. dorri is oviparous.
