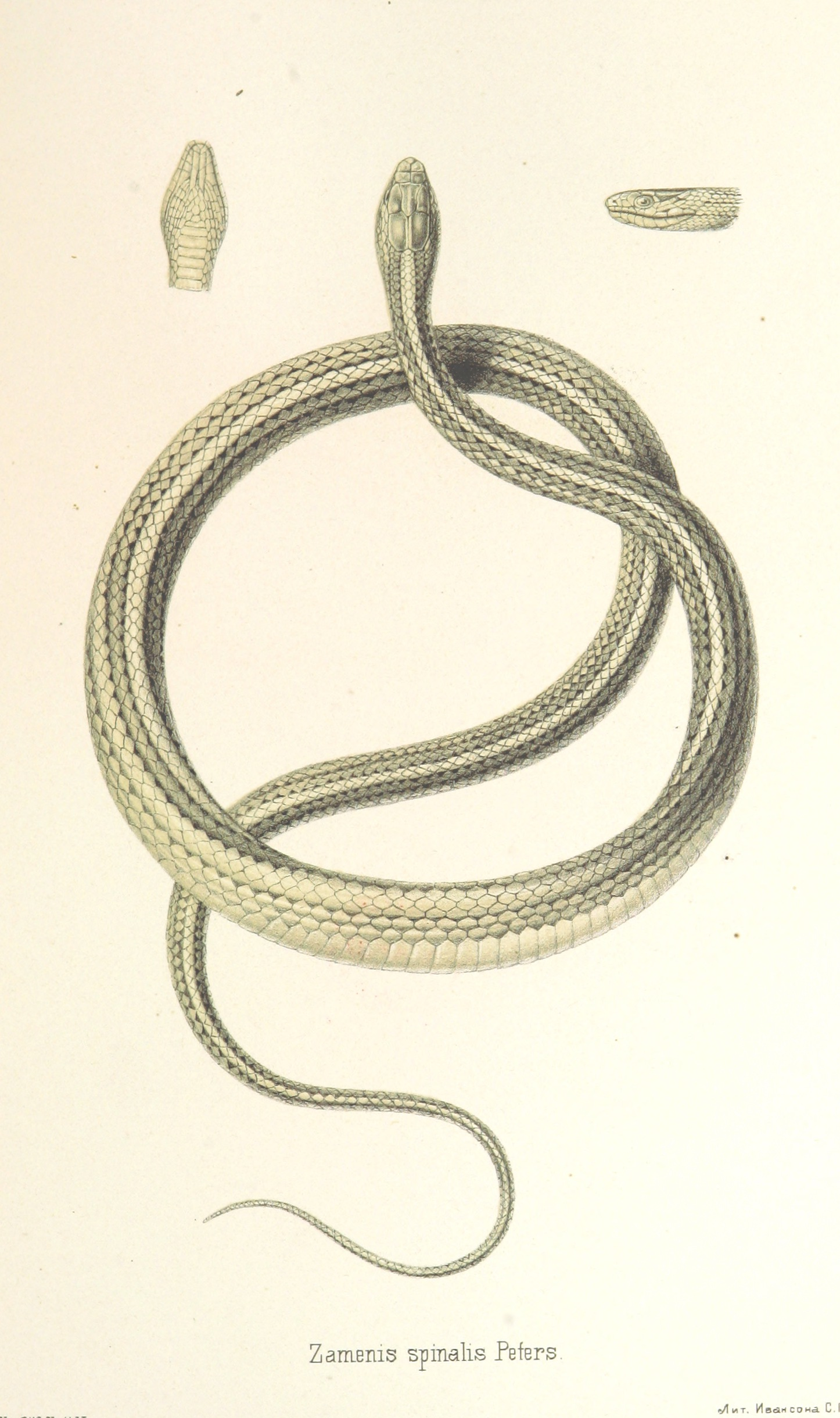

Conservation status
- Least Concern (IUCN 3.1)

Scientific classification
- Kingdom: Animalia
- Phylum: Chordata
- Order: Squamata
- Suborder: Serpentes
- Family: Colubridae
- Genus: Orientocoluber; Kharin, 2011
- Species: O. spinalis

Binomial name
- Orientocoluber spinalis (Peters, 1866)

= Slender racer =

Species of snake

The slender racer (Orientocoluber spinalis) is a species of snake of the family Colubridae.

== Geographic range ==
The snake is found in Asia.

== Description ==
As its name suggests, it is a slender-bodied snake with a total body length of about 50-90 cm.

It is known for its high mobility.
