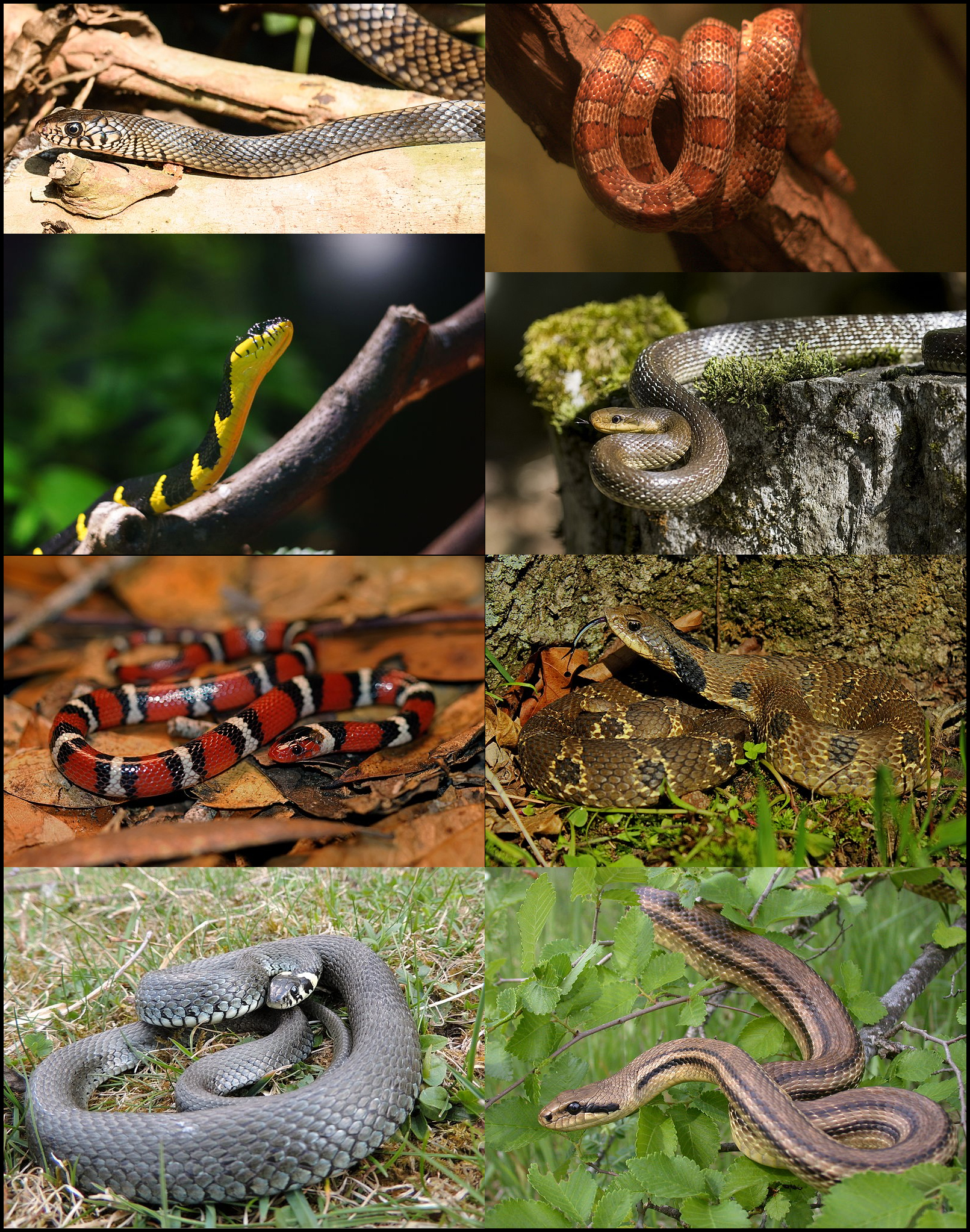
- Colubrid species

Scientific classification
- Kingdom: Animalia
- Phylum: Chordata
- Class: Reptilia
- Order: Squamata
- Suborder: Serpentes
- Superfamily: Colubroidea
- Family: Colubridae; Oppel, 1811
- Colubridae distribution

= Colubridae =

Colubridae Temporal range: Late Eocene – present

Family of snakes

Colubridae (/kəˈluːbrɪdiː/, commonly known as colubrids /ˈkɒljʊbrɪdz/, from Latin: coluber, 'snake') is a family of snakes. With 249 genera, it is the largest snake family. The earliest fossil species of the family date back to the Late Eocene epoch, with earlier origins suspected. Colubrid snakes are found on every continent except Antarctica.

== Description ==
Colubrids are a very diverse group of snakes. They can exhibit many different body styles, body sizes, colours, and patterns. They can also live in many different types of habitats including aquatic, terrestrial, semi-arboreal, arboreal, desert, mountainous forests, semi-fossorial, and brackish waters. A primarily shy and harmless group of snakes, the vast majority of colubrids are not venomous, nor do most colubrids produce venom that is medically impactful to mammals. However, the bites of some can escalate quickly to emergency situations. Furthermore, within the Colubridae, the South African boomslang and twig snakes, as well as the Asian keelback snakes (Rhabdophis sp.) have long been notorious for inflicting the worst bites on humans, with the most confirmed fatalities.

Some colubrids are described as opisthoglyphous (often simply called "rear-fanged"), meaning they possess shortened, grooved "fangs" located at the back of the upper jaw. It is thought that opisthoglyphy evolved many times throughout the natural history of squamates and is an evolutionary precursor to the larger, frontal fangs of vipers and elapids. These grooved fangs tend to be sharpest on the anterior and posterior edges. While feeding, colubrids move their jaws backward to create a cutting motion between the posterior edge and the prey's tissue. In order to inject venom, colubridae must chew on their prey. Colubrids can also be proteroglyphous (fangs at the front of the upper jaw, followed by small solid teeth)

Characteristics of Colubridae include limbless bodies, left lung that is reduced or absent with or without a tracheal lung, well-developed oviducts, premaxillaries that lack teeth, maxilaries oriented longitudinally with teeth that are solid or grooved, mandible without a coronoid bone, dentary that has teeth, only a left carotid artery, intracostal arteries arising from the dorsal aorta every few trunk segments, no cranial infrared receptors occurring in pits or surface indentations, and optic foramina that typically traverse the frontal–parietal–parasphenoid sutures.

== Reproduction ==
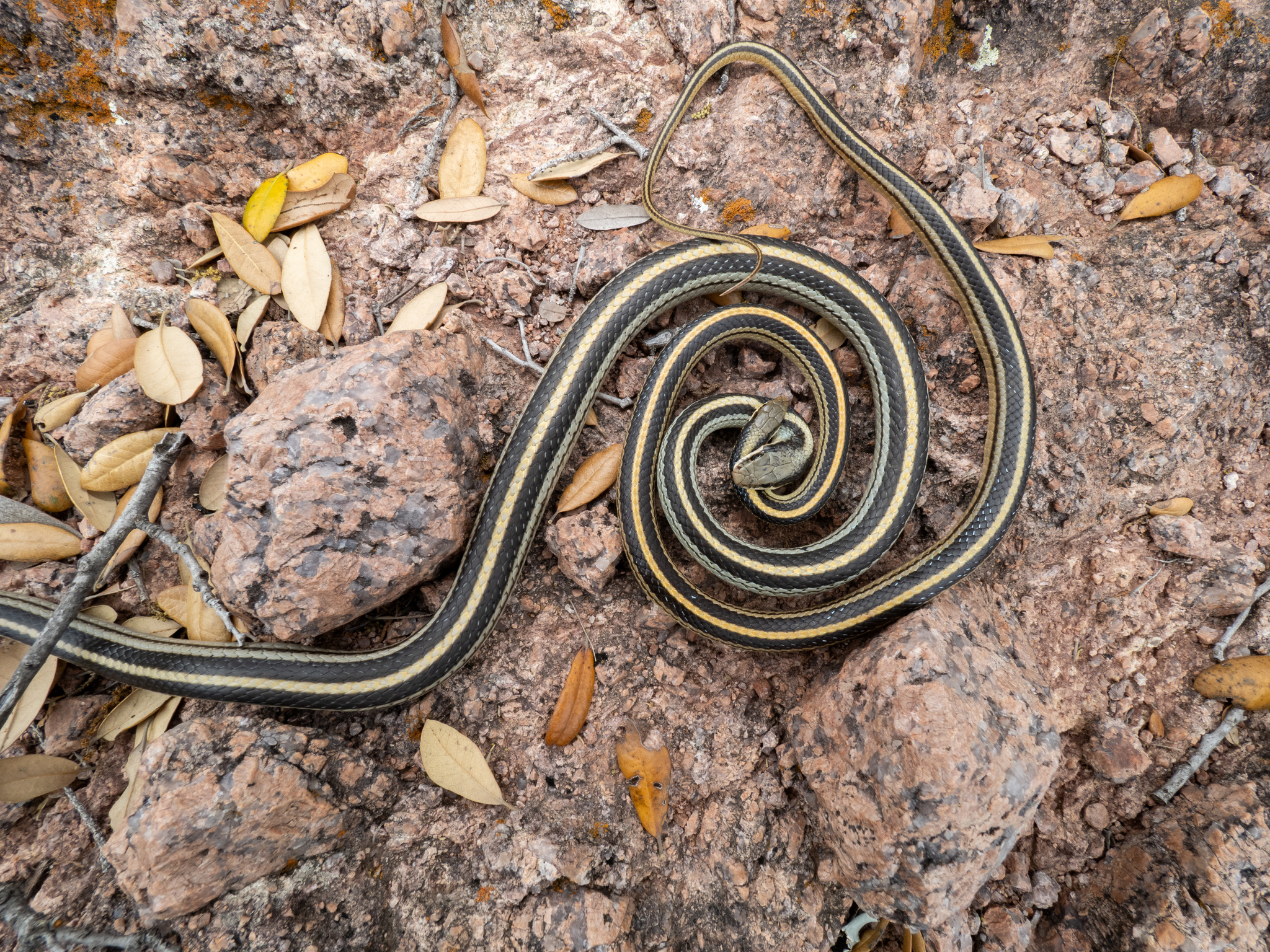
Salvadora lineata mating

Most Colubridae are oviparous (mode of reproduction where an egg is produced that will later hatch) with clutch size varying by size and species of snake. However, certain species of snakes from the subfamilies of Natricinae and Colubrinae are viviparous (mode of reproduction where young are live birthed). These viviparous species can birth various amounts of offspring at a time, but the exact number of offspring depends on the size and species of snake.

== Classification ==
In the past, the Colubridae was not a natural group, as many species assigned to it were more closely related to other groups, such as elapids, than to each other. This family was historically used as a "wastebasket taxon" for snakes that did not fit elsewhere. That is, until recently, colubrids were basically all the colubroids that were not elapids, viperids, or Atractaspis.

However, recent research in molecular phylogenetics has stabilized the classification of historically "colubrid" snakes and the family as currently defined is a monophyletic clade, although additional research will be necessary to sort out all the relationships within this group. As of May 2018, eight subfamilies are recognized.

=== Current subfamilies ===
Sibynophiinae – three genera

- Colubroelaps
- Scaphiodontophis
- Sibynophis

Natricinae – 36 genera (sometimes given as family Natricidae)

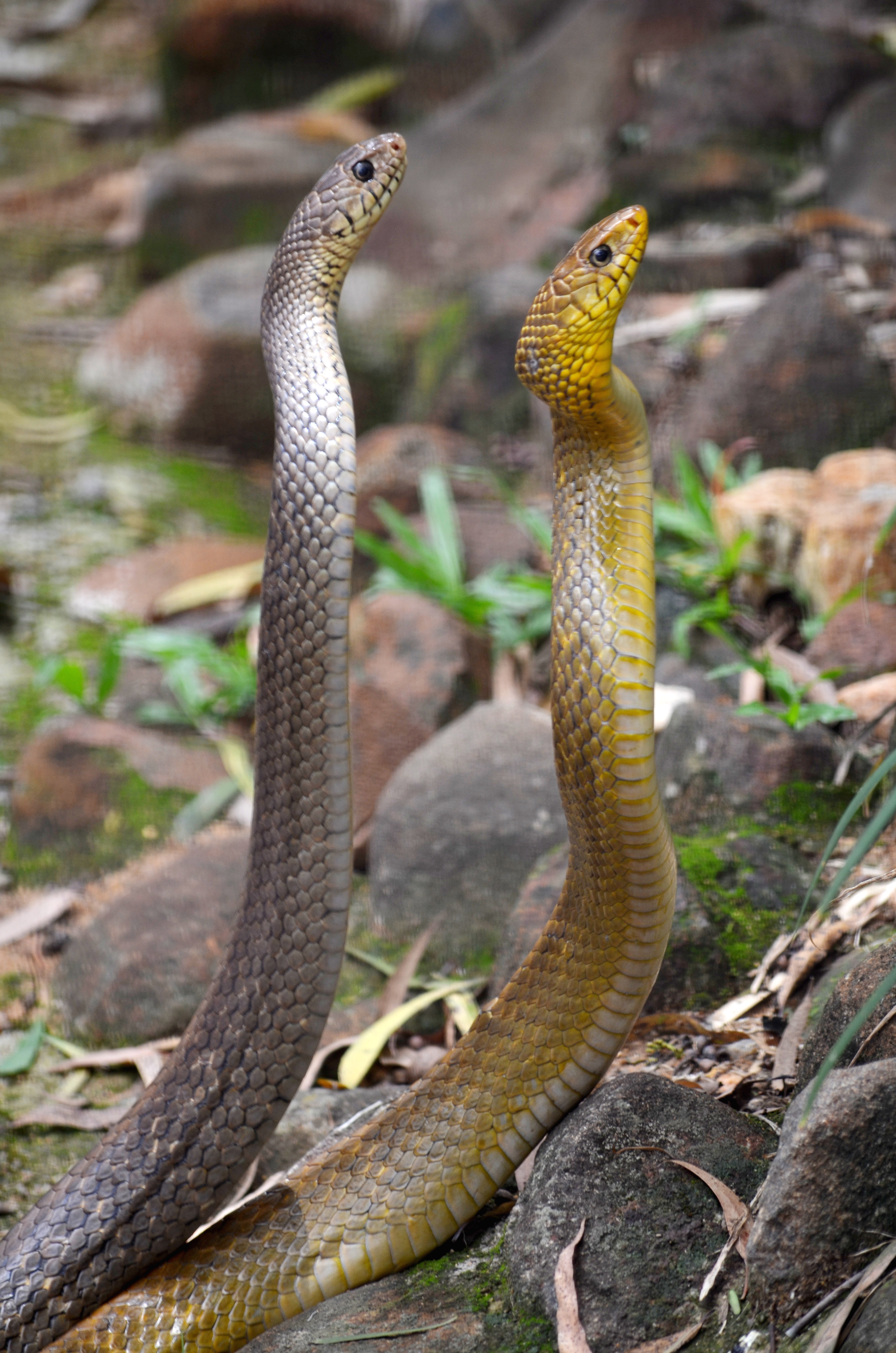
Two Indian rat snakes (grey and yellow)

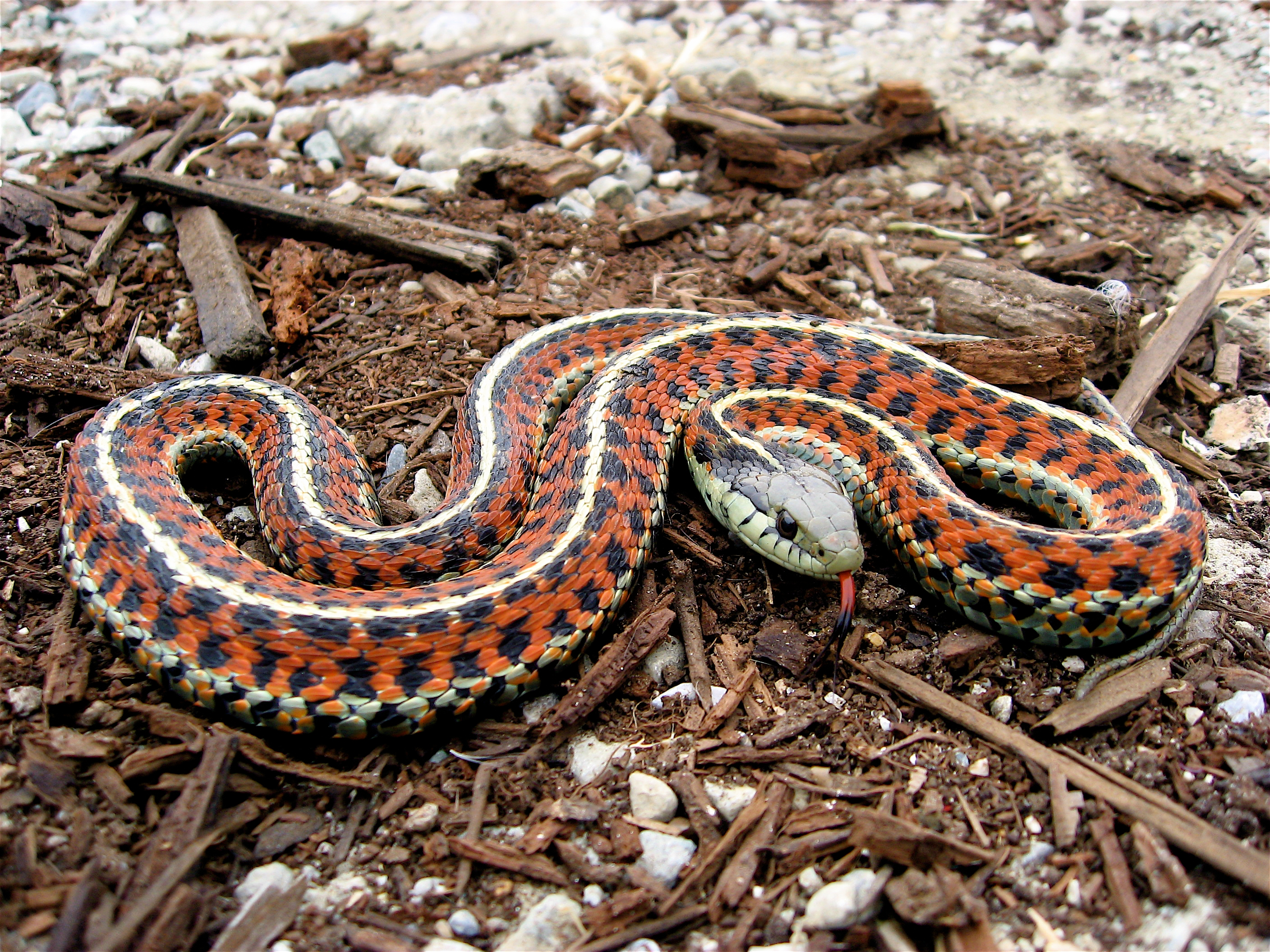
A natricine, Thamnophis sirtalis

- Afronatrix
- Amphiesma
- Amphiesmoides
- Anoplohydrus
- Aspidura
- Atretium
- Blythia
- Clonophis
- Fowlea
- Haldea
- Hebius
- Helophis
- Herpetoreas
- Hydrablabes
- Hydraethiops
- Iguanognathus
- Isanophis
- Limnophis
- Liodytes
- Natriciteres
- Natrix
- †Neonatrix
- Nerodia
- Opisthotropis
- Pseudagkistrodon
- Regina
- Rhabdophis
- Rhabdops
- Smithophis
- Storeria
- Thamnophis
- Trachischium
- Trimerodytes
- Tropidoclonion
- Tropidonophis
- Virginia
- Xenochrophis

Pseudoxenodontinae – two genera

- Plagiopholis
- Pseudoxenodon

Dipsadinae – over 100 genera (sometimes given as family Dipsadidae)

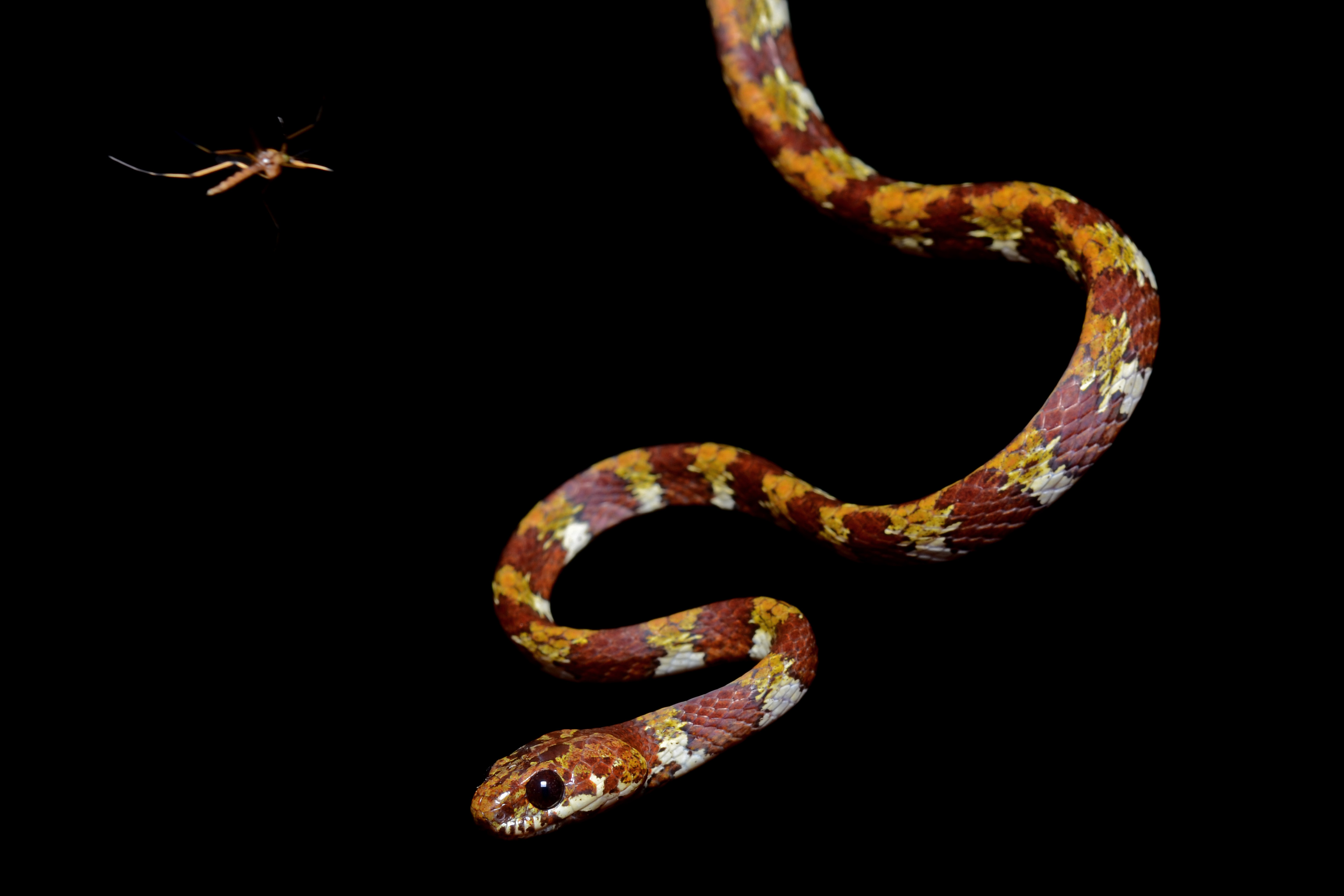
A dipsadine, Sibon longifrenis

- Adelphicos
- Adelphostigma
- Alsophis
- Amastridium
- Amnesteophis
- Amnisiophis
- Apographon
- Apostolepis
- Arcanumophis
- Arrhyton
- Atractus
- Baliodryas
- Boiruna
- Borikenophis
- Caaeteboia
- Calamodontophis
- Caraiba
- Carphophis
- Cenaspis
- Cercophis
- Chersodromus
- Chlorosoma
- Clelia
- Coniophanes
- Conophis
- Contia
- Coronelaps
- Crisantophis
- Cryophis
- Cubophis
- Diadophis
- Diaphorolepis
- Dibernardia
- Dipsas
- Ditaxodon
- Drepanoides
- Dryophylax
- Echinanthera
- Elapomorphus
- Emmochliophis
- Enuliophis
- Enulius
- Erythrolamprus
- Eutrachelophis
- Farancia
- Galvarinus
- Geophis
- Gomesophis
- Haitiophis
- Helicops
- Heterodon
- Hydrodynastes
- Hydromorphus
- Hydrops
- Hypsiglena
- Hypsirhynchus
- Ialtris
- Imantodes
- Incaspis
- Leptodeira
- Lioheterophis
- Lygophis
- Magliophis
- Manolepis
- Mesotes
- Mussurana
- Ninia
- Nothopsis
- Omoadiphas
- Oxyrhopus
- Paikwaophis
- †Paleoheterodon
- Paraphimophis
- Phalotris
- Philodryas
- Phimophis
- Plesiodipsas
- Pliocercus
- Pseudalsophis
- Pseudoboa
- Pseudoeryx
- Pseudoleptodeira
- Psomophis
- Ptychophis
- Rhachidelus
- Rhadinaea
- Rhadinella
- Rhadinophanes
- Rodriguesophis
- Saphenophis
- Sibon
- Siphlophis
- Sordellina
- Synophis
- Tachymenis
- Tachymenoides
- Taeniophallus
- Tantalophis
- Thamnodynastes
- Thermophis
- Tomodon
- Tretanorhinus
- Trimetopon
- Tropidodipsas
- Tropidodryas
- Uromacer
- Urotheca
- Xenodon
- Xenopholis
- Xenoxybelis
- Zonateres

Grayiinae – one genus

- Grayia

Calamariinae – seven genera

- Calamaria
- Calamorhabdium
- Collorhabdium
- Etheridgeum
- Macrocalamus
- Pseudorabdion
- Rabdion

Ahaetuliinae – five genera

- Ahaetulla
- Chrysopelea
- Dendrelaphis
- Dryophiops
- Proahaetulla

Colubrinae – 93 genera

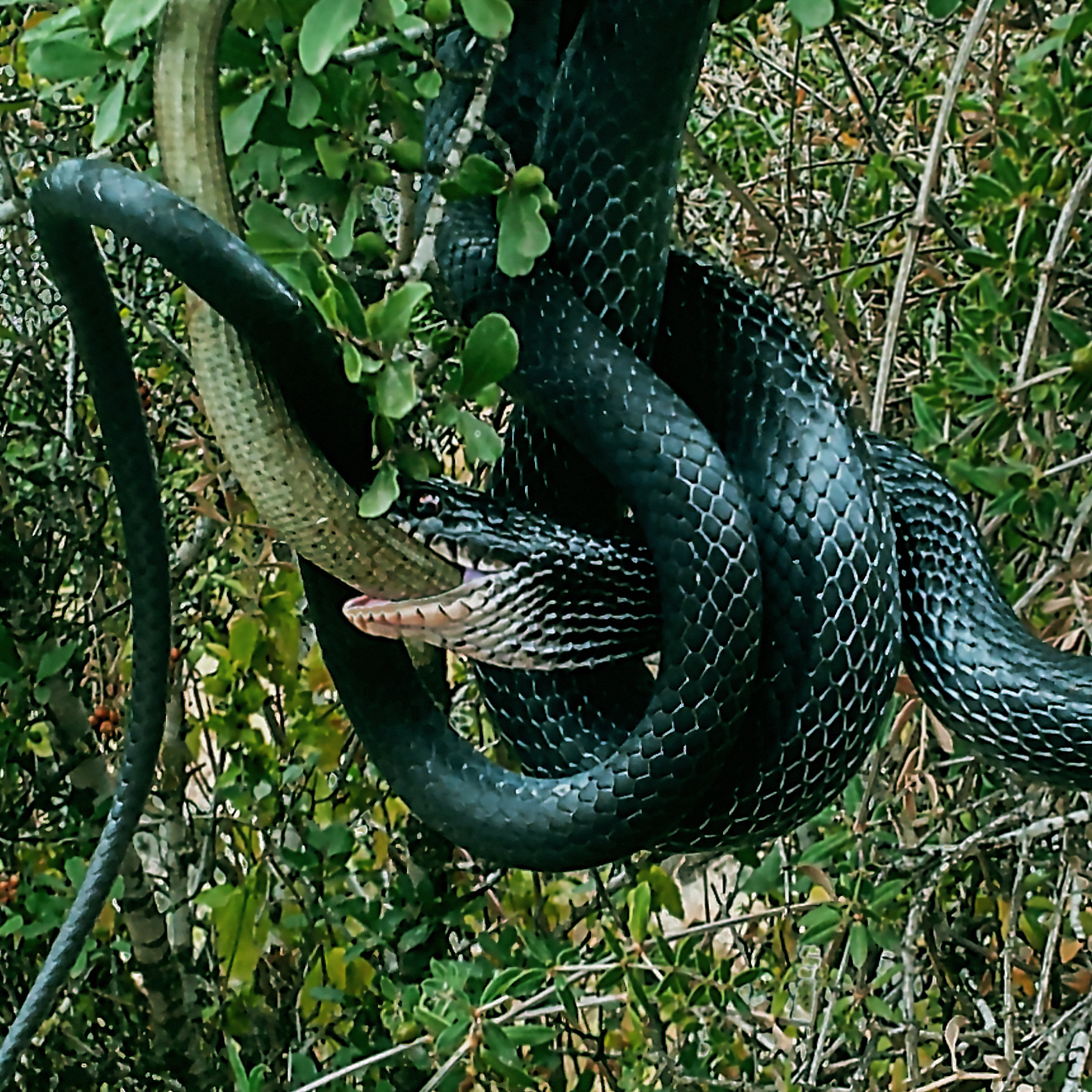
A colubrine, Dolichophis jugularis, preying on a legless lizard, a sheltopusik

- Aeluroglena
- Aprosdoketophis
- Archelaphe
- Arizona
- Bamanophis
- Bogertophis
- Boiga
- Cemophora
- Chapinophis
- Chironius
- Coelognathus
- Coluber
- Conopsis
- Coronella
- Crotaphopeltis
- Dasypeltis
- Dendrophidion
- Dipsadoboa
- Dispholidus
- Dolichophis
- Drymarchon
- Drymobius
- Drymoluber
- Eirenis
- Elaphe
- Euprepiophis
- Ficimia
- Geagras
- Gonyosoma
- Gyalopion
- Hapsidophrys
- Hemerophis
- Hemorrhois
- Hierophis
- Lampropeltis
- Leptodrymus
- Leptophis
- Liopeltis
- Lycodon
- Lytorhynchus
- Macroprotodon
- Masticophis
- Mastigodryas
- Meizodon
- Mopanveldophis
- Muhtarophis
- Oligodon
- Oocatochus
- Opheodrys
- Oreocryptophis
- Orientocoluber
- Oxybelis
- Palusophis
- Pantherophis
- †Paracoluber
- Persiophis
- Philothamnus
- Phrynonax
- Phyllorhynchus
- Pituophis
- Platyceps
- Pseudelaphe
- Pseudoficimia
- Ptyas
- Rhamnophis
- Rhinobothryum
- Rhinocheilus
- Rhynchocalamus
- Salvadora
- Scaphiophis
- Scolecophis
- Senticolis
- Simophis
- Sonora
- Spalerosophis
- Spilotes
- Stegonotus
- Stenorrhina
- Stichophanes
- Symphimus
- Sympholis
- Tantilla
- Tantillita
- Telescopus
- Thelotornis
- Thrasops
- Toxicodryas
- Trimorphodon
- Wallaceophis
- Wallophis
- Xenelaphis
- Xyelodontophis
- Zamenis
- †Zelceophis

Sub-family currently undetermined

- Elapoidis
- Gongylosoma
- Lycognathophis
- Oreocalamus
- Tetralepis
- †Ameiseophis
- †Dryinoides
- †Hispanophis
- †Floridaophis
- †Micronatrix
- †Miocoluber
- †Mionatrix?
- †Nebraskophis
- †Palaeonatrix
- †Paleofarancia
- †Paraoxybelis
- †Paraxenophis
- †Periergophis
- †Pollackophis
- †Pseudocemophora
- †Texasophis

=== Former subfamilies ===
These taxa have been at one time or another classified as part of the Colubridae, but are now either classified as parts of other families, or are no longer accepted because all the species within them have been moved to other (sub)families.

- Subfamily Aparallactinae (now a subfamily of Lamprophiidae, sometimes combined with Atractaspidinae)
- Subfamily Boiginae (now part of Colubrinae)
- Subfamily Boodontinae (some of which now treated as subfamily Grayiinae of the new Colubridae, others moved to family Lamprophiidae as part of subfamilies Lamprophiinae, Pseudaspidinae and Pseudoxyrhophiidae, which are now sometimes treated as families)
- Subfamily Dispholidinae (now part of Colubrinae)
- Subfamily Homalopsinae (now family Homalopsidae)
- Subfamily Lamprophiinae (now a subfamily of Lamprophiidae)
- Subfamily Lycodontinae (now part of Colubrinae)
- Subfamily Lycophidinae (now part of Lamprophiidae)
- Subfamily Pareatinae (now family Pareidae, sometimes incorrectly spelled Pareatidae)
- Subfamily Philothamninae (now part of Colubrinae)
- Subfamily Psammophiinae (now a subfamily of Lamprophiidae)
- Subfamily Pseudoxyrhophiinae (now a subfamily of Lamprophiidae)
- Subfamily Xenoderminae (now family Xenodermidae, sometimes incorrectly spelled Xenodermatidae)
- Subfamily Xenodontinae (which many authors put in Dipsadinae/Dipsadidae)

== Fossil record ==
The oldest colubrid fossils are indeterminate vertebrae from Thailand and specimens of the genus Nebraskophis from the U.S. state of Georgia, both from the Late Eocene. The presence of derived colubrids in North America so early on, despite their presumed Old World origins, suggests that they originated even earlier. The Pliocene (Blancan) fossil record in the Ringold Formation of Adams County, Washington has yielded fossils from a number of colubrids including Elaphe pliocenica, Elaphe vulpina, Lampropeltis getulus, Pituophis catenifer, a Thamnophis species, and the extinct genus Tauntonophis.

== See also ==
- List of largest snakes
