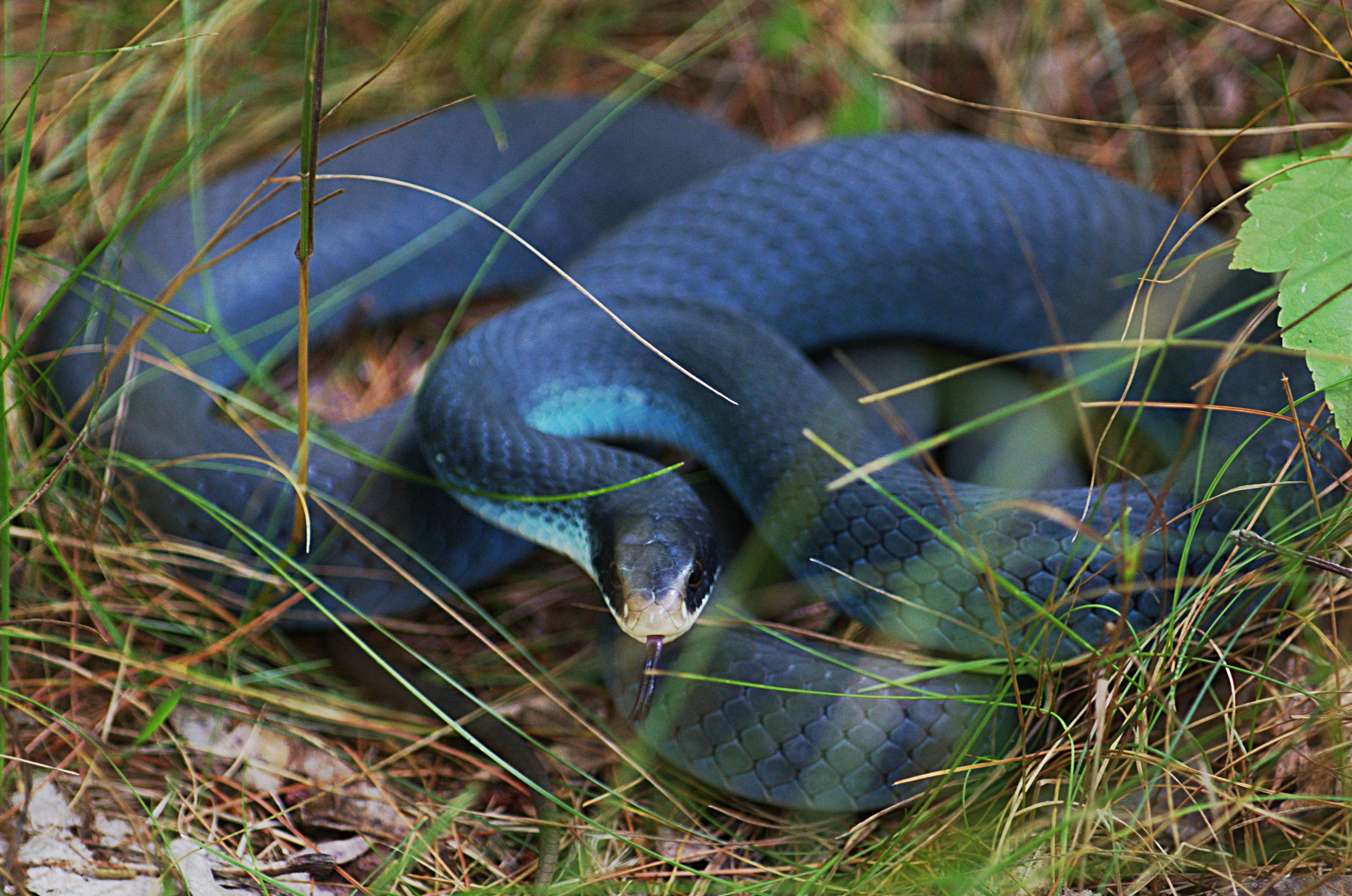
- Eastern racer (Coluber constrictor)

Scientific classification
- Kingdom: Animalia
- Phylum: Chordata
- Class: Reptilia
- Order: Squamata
- Suborder: Serpentes
- Clade: Caenophidia
- Clade: Colubroides; Zaher et al., 2009

Subclades
- Xenodermidae; Colubriformes (Günther, 1864); Pareatidae; Endoglyptodonta (Zaher et al., 2009); Viperidae; Homalopsidae; Elapoidea; Colubroidea

Synonyms
- Xenophidia

= Colubroides =

Clade of snakes

The Colubroides are a clade in the suborder Serpentes (snakes). It contains over 85% of all the extant species of snakes. The largest family is Colubridae, but it also includes at least six other families, at least four of which were once classified as "Colubridae" before molecular phylogenetics helped in understanding their relationships. It has been found to be monophyletic.

Morphological synapomorphies are defined as such from Zaher et al. (2009):

Loss of the right carotid artery; intercostal arteries arising from the dorsal aorta throughout the trunk at intervals of several body segments; specialized expanded costal cartilages; presence of a muscle protractor laryngeus; separate muscle protractor quadrati; separate spinalis and semispinalis portion in the epaxial trunk; spinules or spines covering the hemipenial body.

Traditionally, the name "Colubroidea" was used for this clade. This was seen problematic, however, as many of the same studies that support this clade of snakes also advocated for the various subfamilies of Colubridae to be reevaluated as proper families in their own right. As the result of this, Zaher et al. (2009) proposed to rename the clade as "Colubroides", restricting Colubroidea to the clade Colubridae and several related families that were formerly colubrid subfamilies.

Below is a phylogeny of colubroid snakes found in many analyses:

- Colubroides
  - Xenodermoidea
    - Xenodermidae
  - Colubriformes
    - Pareoidea
      - Pareidae
        - Pareinae
        - Xylophiinae
    - Endoglyptodonta
      - Viperoidea
        - Viperidae
          - Viperinae
          - - Azemiopinae
            - Crotalinae
      - - Homalopsoidea
          - Homalopsidae
        - - Elapoidea
            - Prosymnidae
            - - Buhoma
              - - Psammophiidae
                  - Pseudaspidinae
                  - Psammophiinae
                - - - Lamprophiidae
                      - Pseudoxyrhophiinae
                      - - Micrelapiinae
                        - - Psammodynastiinae
                          - Lamprophiinae
                    - - Elapidae
                        - Calliophiinae
                        - - Micrurinae
                          - - Najinae Naja
                            - - Bungarinae
                              - - Elapsoidea
                                - Hydrophiinae
                      - Atractaspididae
                        - Cyclocorinae
                        - Atractaspidinae
          - Colubroidea
            - Colubridae
              - - Grayiinae
                - Calamariinae
              - - Ahaetuliinae
                - Colubrinae
            - - - Sibynophiidae
                - Natricidae
              - - Pseudoxenodontidae
                - - Dipsadidae
                    - Carphophiinae Carphophis
                    - - Xenodontinae
                      - Dipsadinae
