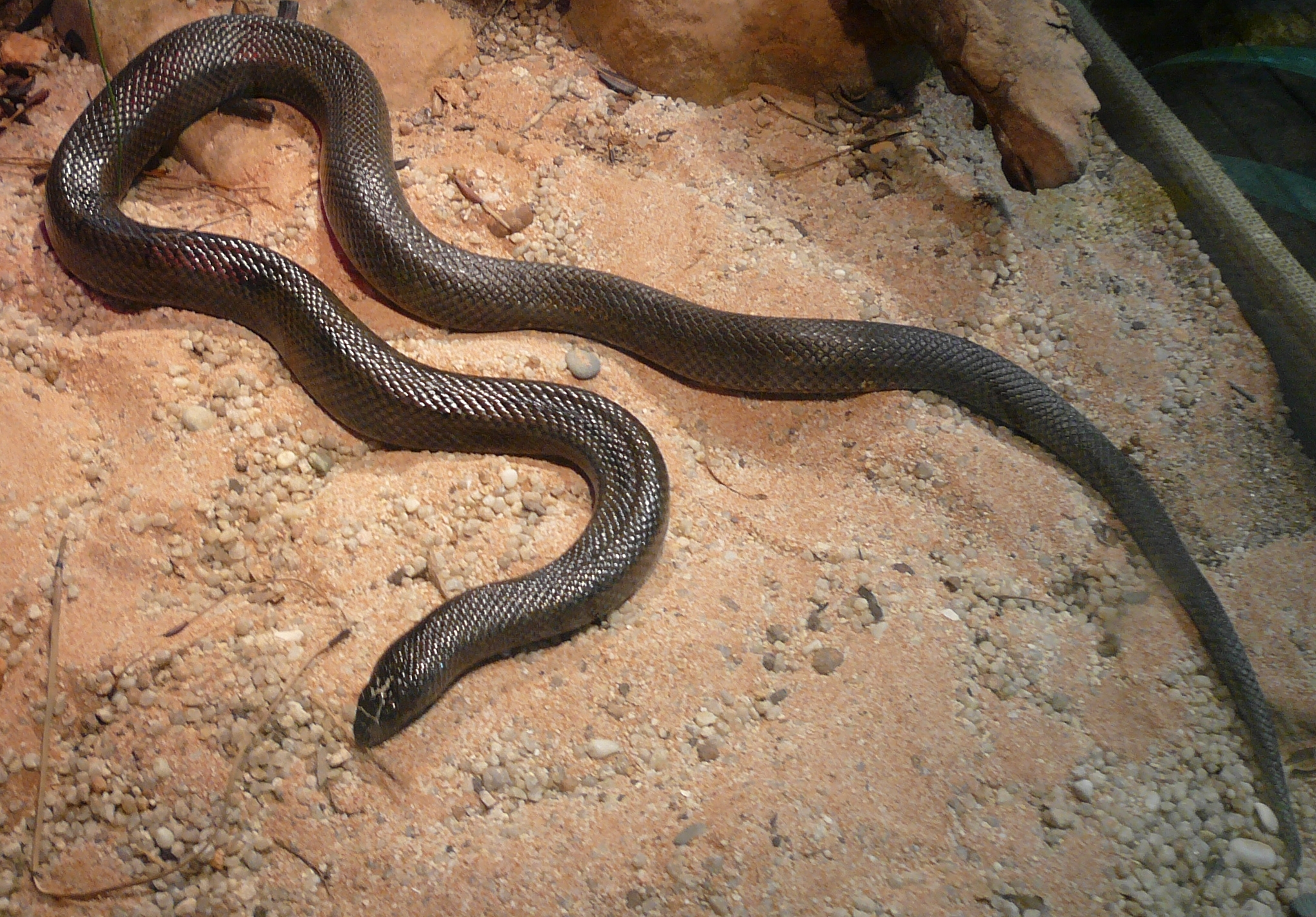

Conservation status
- Least Concern (IUCN 3.1)

Scientific classification
- Kingdom: Animalia
- Phylum: Chordata
- Class: Reptilia
- Order: Squamata
- Suborder: Serpentes
- Family: Pseudaspididae
- Genus: Pseudaspis; Fitzinger, 1843
- Species: P. cana

Binomial name
- Pseudaspis cana (Linnaeus, 1758)
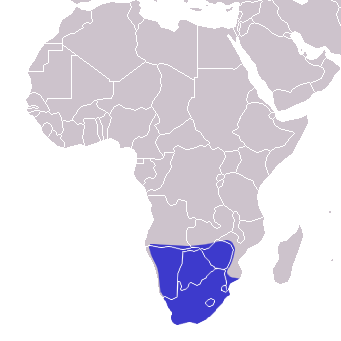
- Distribution of the mole snake

Synonyms
- Coluber cana Linnaeus, 1758; Duberria cana — Fitzinger, 1826; Coronella cana — A.M.C. Duméril, Bibron & A.H.A. Duméril, 1854; Pseudaspis cana — Cope, 1864

= Mole snake =

Species of snake

The mole snake (Pseudaspis cana) is a species of snake. It has been placed in the family Lamprophiidae, and more recently in the family Pseudaspididae, along with the genus Pythonodipsas. It is native to much of southern Africa, and is the only member of the genus Pseudaspis. A study showed that P. cana is caught and consumed by the honey badger, among other species. Remains of the mole snake were found in the faeces, and suggest the consumed individuals were larger specimens.

== Taxonomy ==
P. cana was originally described by Carl Linnaeus in his landmark 1758 10th edition of Systema Naturae. Its original binomial name was Coluber cana. Since then, it has also been called Coronella cana by André Marie Constant Duméril, Gabriel Bibron and Auguste Duméril in 1854, before being reclassified as Pseudaspis cana by Edward Drinker Cope in 1864. P. cana is the only species in genus Pseudaspis. The genus has been placed in the family Lamprophiidae. More recently it has been placed in the family Pseudaspididae, along with the genera Buhoma and Pythonodipsas, although a 2019 study concluded that the status of Pseudaspididae "deserves to be viewed with caution", and Buhoma may not belong in the family.

== Description ==
The mole snake can grow to a total length (including tail) of 2 m (6 ft 7 in). A small head and pointed snout are characteristics of the species. It has a firm, tubular body. Like the majority of the Lamprophiidae, P. cana is not venomous.

In mature individuals, the body is mostly one colour, and may vary from yellow to brown to grey, and in some cases, solid black. The young have dark markings and spots that are gradually lost as the individual ages. Colour may be related to geography; in the south, most specimens are black, whereas specimens found in the northern part of their range are brown, reddish-brown, grey, or yellow.

== Diet ==
The primary food source of P. cana is golden moles (hence the common name), rodents, and other small mammals. For this reason, it is considered useful for the natural control of problem rodents.

Its diet may also include the eggs and chicks of seafowl. At Robben Island, mole snakes were observed eating a Cape weaver chick(?) and a cormorant chick (probably a crowned cormorant), and the eggs of African penguins, Hartlaub's gulls and helmeted guineafowl (the eggs of swift terns, Cape francolins and chukar partridges are probably also eaten). Juveniles were observed eating clicking stream frogs.

The mole snake is a nest predator of the Karoo prinia (Prinia maculosa). P. cana is one of at least six snake species which cause reproductive loss and decrease of nest success in P. maculosa.

== Distribution and habitat ==
The range of the mole snake encompasses most of southern Africa. P. cana is common in Kalahari Gemsbok National Park. It is widely distributed, with a range stretching from Angola in the north to Kenya in the east to South Africa.

The mole snake lives in the abandoned burrows of other animals. It can be found in a variety of habitats, such as the scrublands of the South African Cape and the Highveld plateaux and grasslands. It has also been found in mountainous and desert areas.

== Reproduction ==
The mole snake is viviparous, mating takes place in late spring (October), and the female gives birth to usually between 25 and 50 young, with as many as 95 possible. The young snakes are 20 to 30 cm in length at birth.

== In captivity ==
The mole snake can be "quite ferocious". Though not venomous, they can cause severe bite wounds. Despite this, they are said to make good pets when sufficiently settled.

== Gallery ==
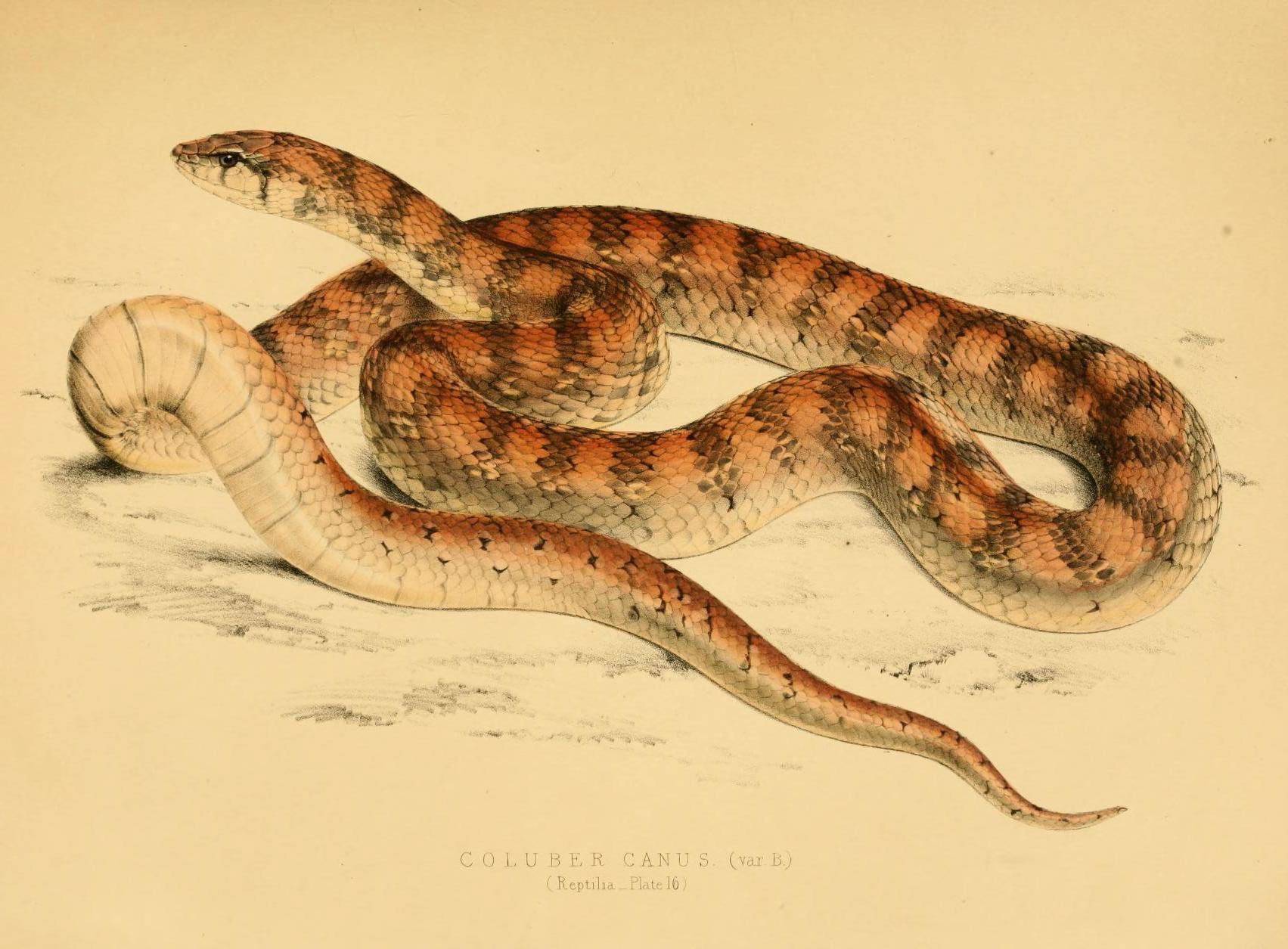
Illustration of a mole snake

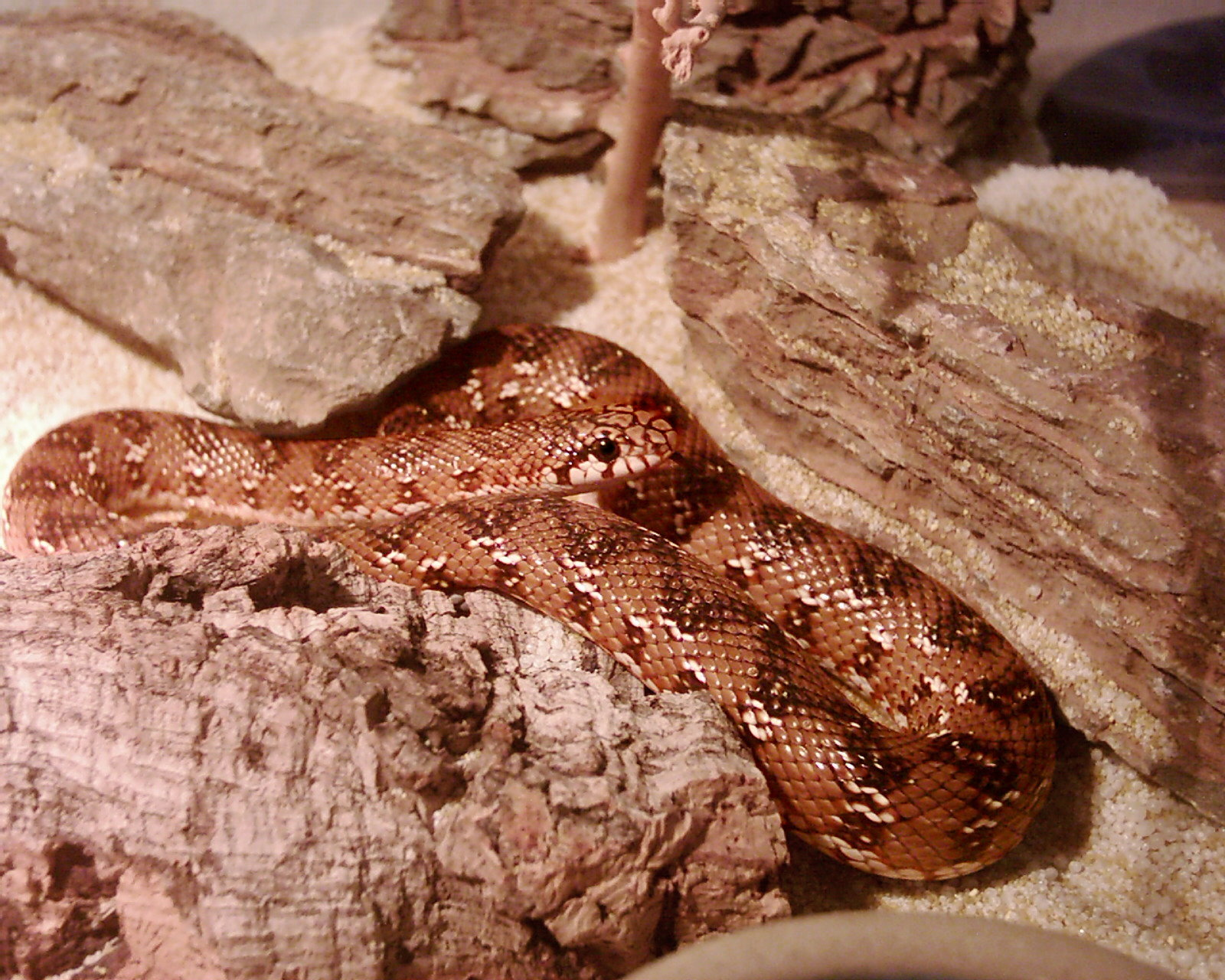
Juvenile mole snake (Pseudaspis cana) during sunbathing

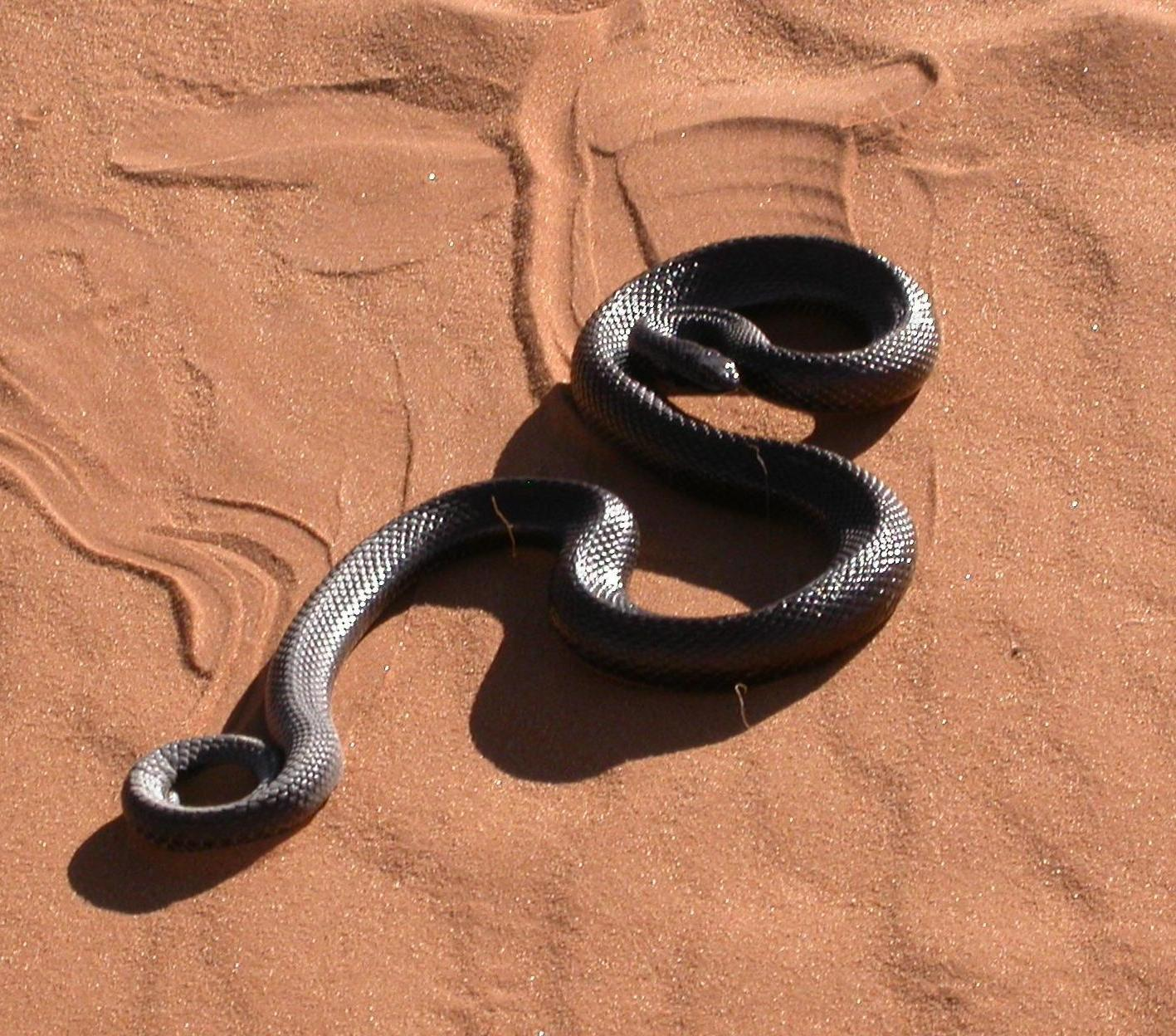
A mole snake near Rehoboth, Namibia

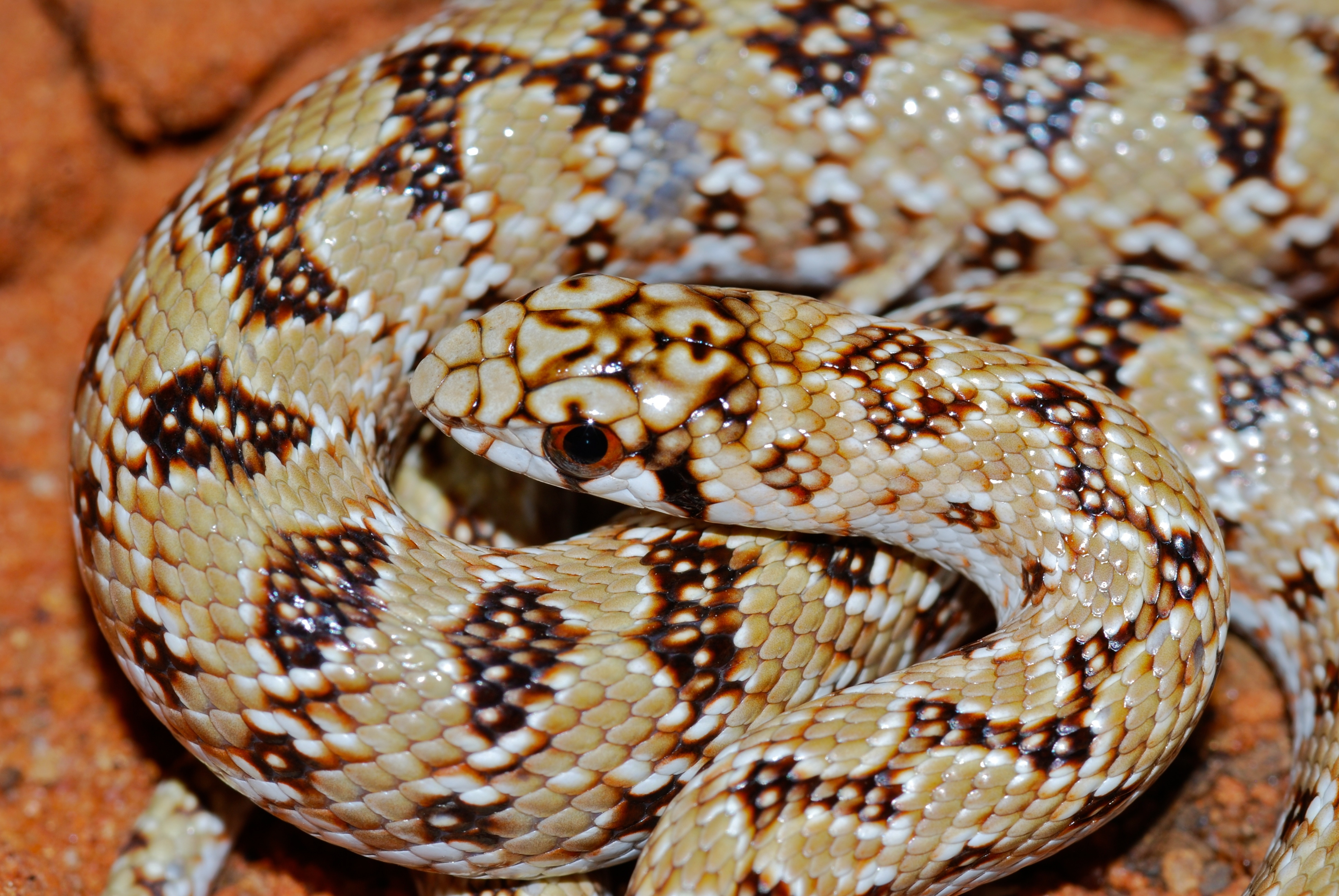
Juvenile mole snake, Auob River bed, Kgalagadi Transfrontier Park, South Africa

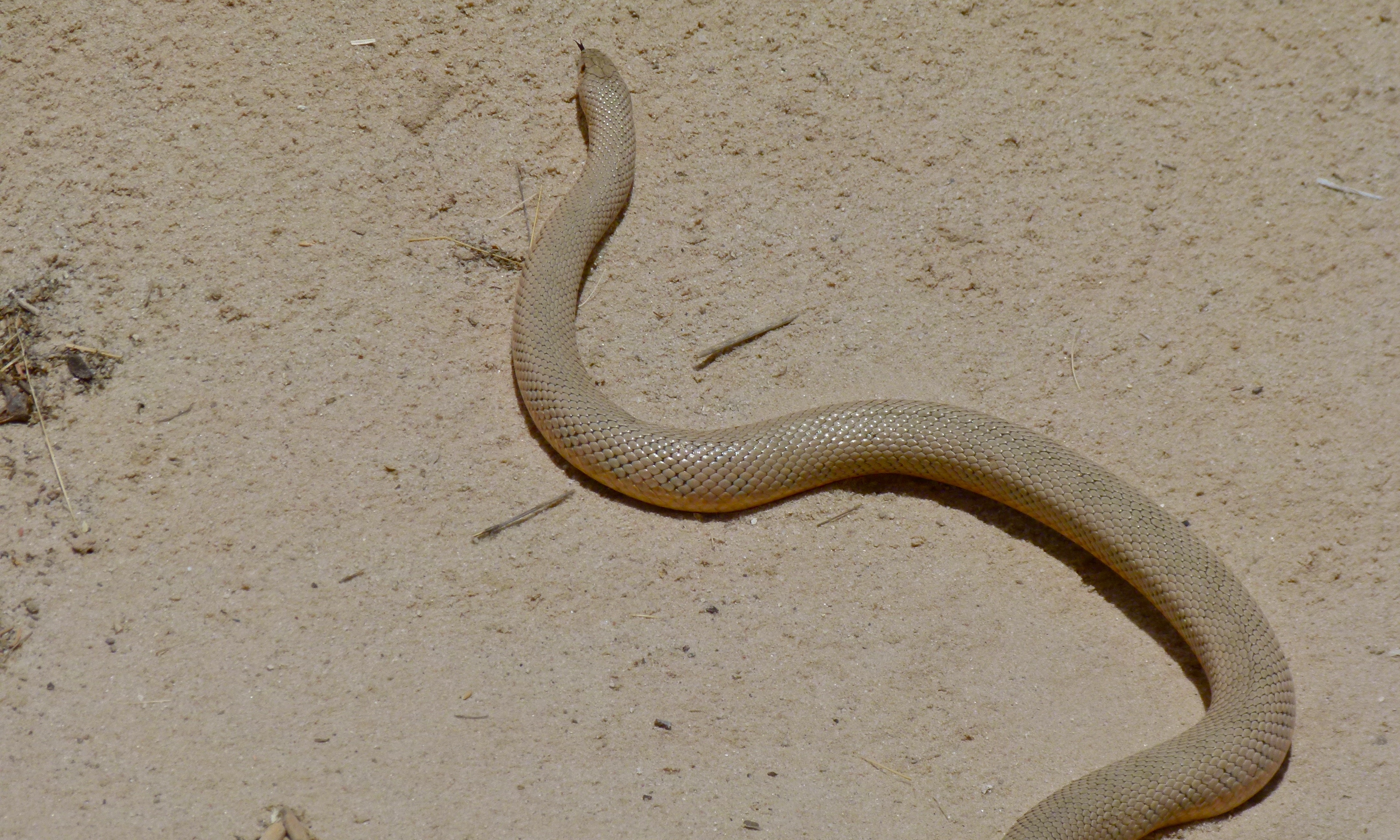
A mole snake, Nossob River, Kgalagadi Transfrontier Park

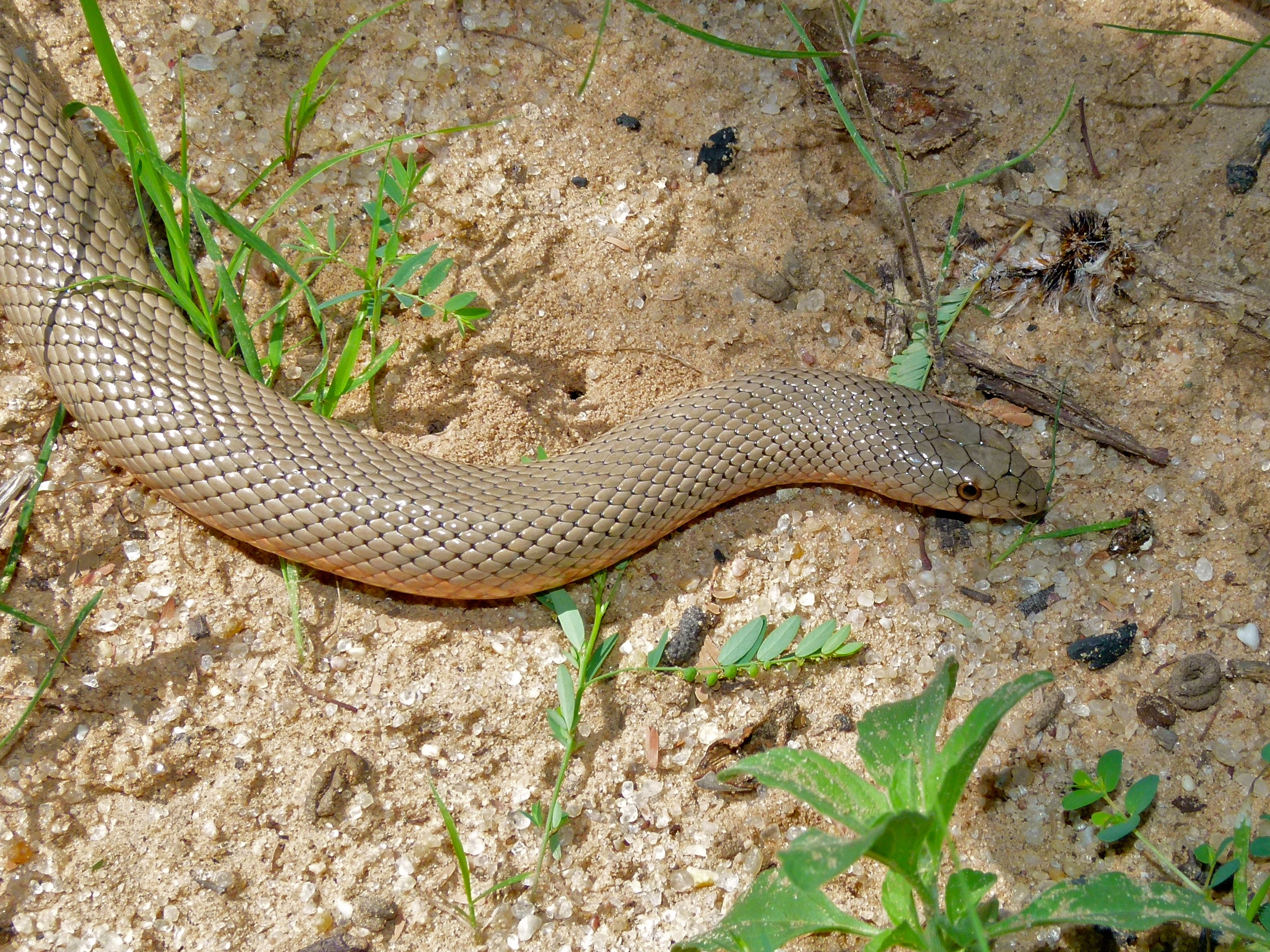
A mole snake, Lijersdraal picnic site, Kgalagadi Transfrontier Park

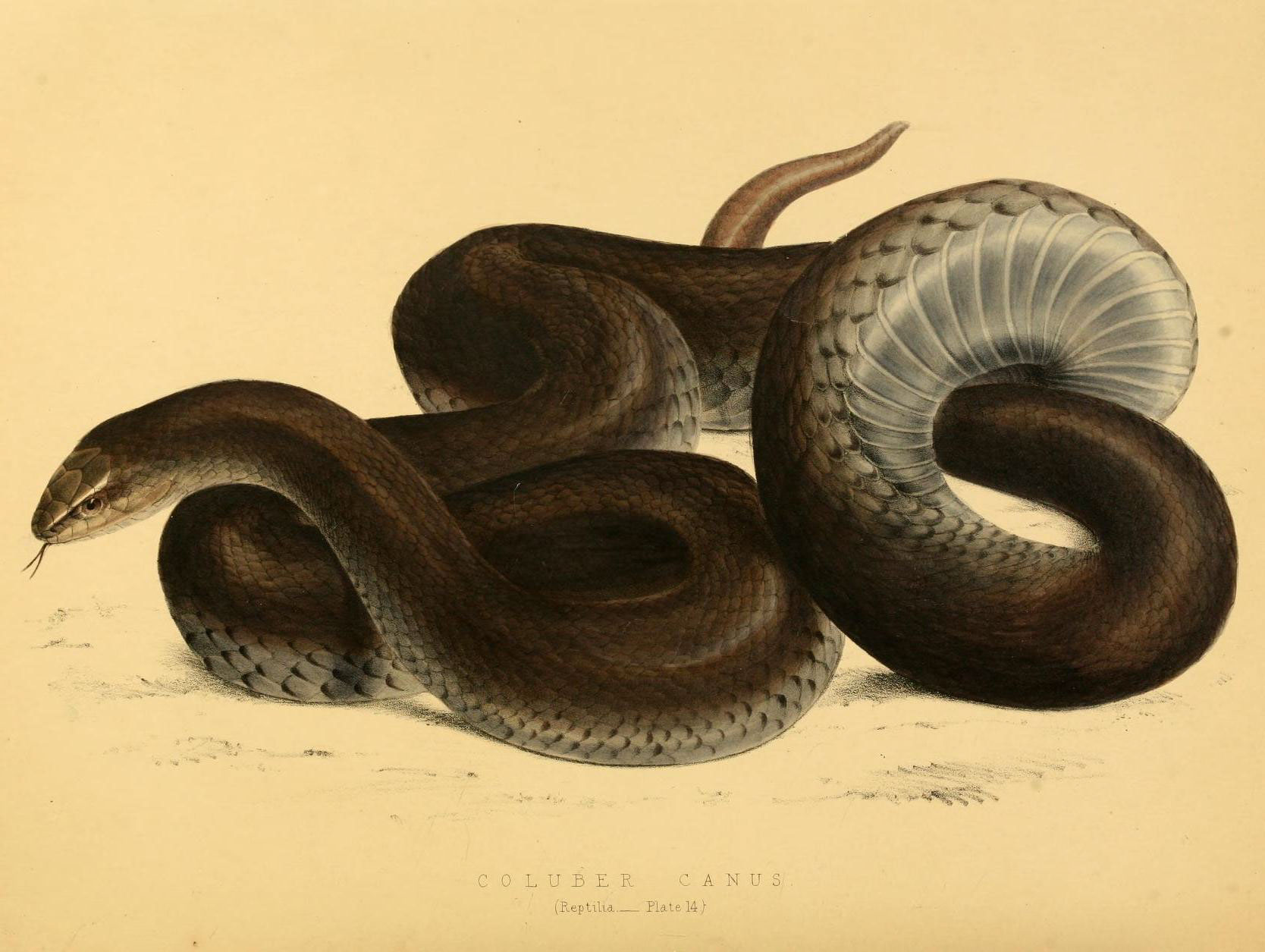
Illustration of a mole snake
