= Gongylosoma mukutense =

Conservation status
- Critically Endangered (IUCN 3.1)

Scientific classification
- Kingdom: Animalia
- Phylum: Chordata
- Class: Reptilia
- Order: Squamata
- Suborder: Serpentes
- Family: Colubridae
- Genus: Gongylosoma
- Species: G. mukutense

Binomial name
- Gongylosoma mukutense Grismer, Das & Leong, 2003
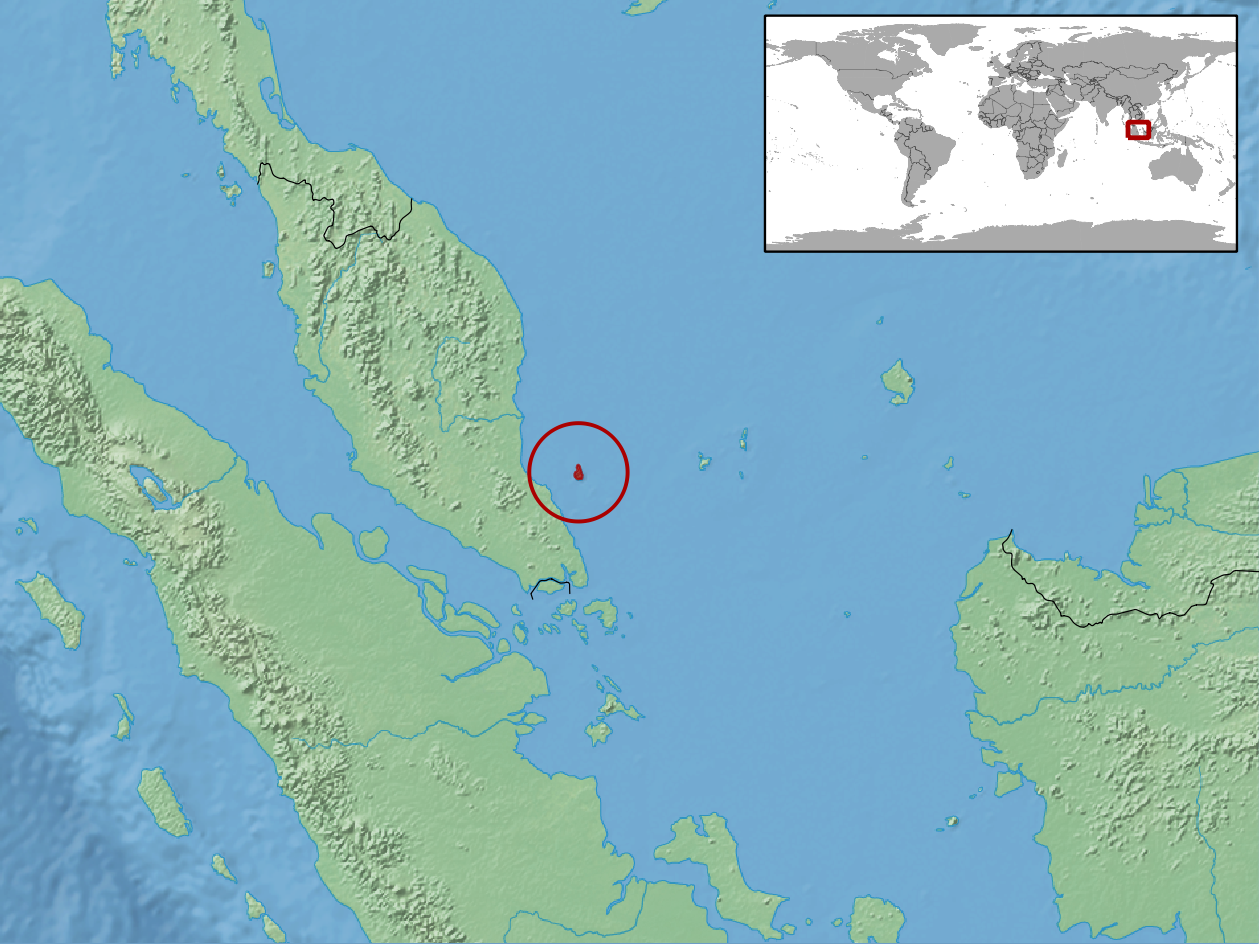

Species of snake

Gongylosoma mukutense, the Mukut smooth snake or Pulau Tioman ground snake, is a species of snake of the superfamily Colubroidea.

== Geographic range ==
The snake is found in Malaysia.

== Diet ==
Mukut smooth snakes are thought to eat spiders.
