= Blyth's reticulated snake =

Conservation status
- Data Deficient (IUCN 3.1)

Scientific classification
- Kingdom: Animalia
- Phylum: Chordata
- Class: Reptilia
- Order: Squamata
- Suborder: Serpentes
- Family: Colubridae
- Genus: Blythia
- Species: B. reticulata

Binomial name
- Blythia reticulata (Blyth, 1854)

Synonyms
- Calamaria reticulata Blyth, 1854; Blythia reticulata — Theobald, 1868; Aproaspidops antecursorum Annandale, 1912; Blythia reticulata — M.A. Smith, 1943; Blythia reticulata — Wallach et al., 2014

Species of snake

Blythia reticulata, commonly known as Blyth's reticulate snake, Blyth's reticulated snake, or the iridescent snake, is a species of snake in the subfamily Natricinae of the family Colubridae of the superfamily Colubroidea. The species is endemic to Asia.

== Etymology ==
The genus Blythia was named after Edward Blyth (1810–1873), curator of the museum of the Asiatic Society of Bengal, by William Theobald in 1868.

== Geographic range ==
B. reticulata is found in India and parts of South Asia and Southeast Asia. In India it is found in the states of Arunachal Pradesh, Assam, Manipur, and Meghalaya (Khasi Hills). It is also found in Myanmar (formerly called Burma) and southeastern Tibet (China).

== Habitat ==
The preferred natural habitat of B. reticulata is forest.

== Description ==
B. reticulata has the following scalation. The rostral scale is about as broad as deep, and is visible from above. The suture between the internasals is one-half to two-thirds as long as that between the prefrontals. The frontal is longer than its distance from the end of the snout, about two-thirds the length of the parietals. One postocular and one elongated temporal scale are present. There are six upper labials, of which the third and fourth enter the eye. The first upper labial is smallest, and the sixth largest. Four lower labials are in contact with the anterior chin shields. The posterior chin shields are small. The dorsal scales are in 13 rows at midbody. The ventral scales are 127–130 in number, and the anal scale is divided. The subcaudals count is 19–29.

This snake is blackish-brown above and below, with the lateral and ventral scales edged with lighter color.

Total length of Blyth's reticulated snake is 16.6 in (420 mm), which includes a tail 1.65 in (42 mm) long.

== Behavior ==
B. reticulata is terrestrial.

== Reproduction ==
The mode of reproduction of B. reticulata is unknown.

== Taxonomy ==
The genus Blythia was monotypic for almost 150 years, until a second species, Blythia hmuifang, was described in 2017.
