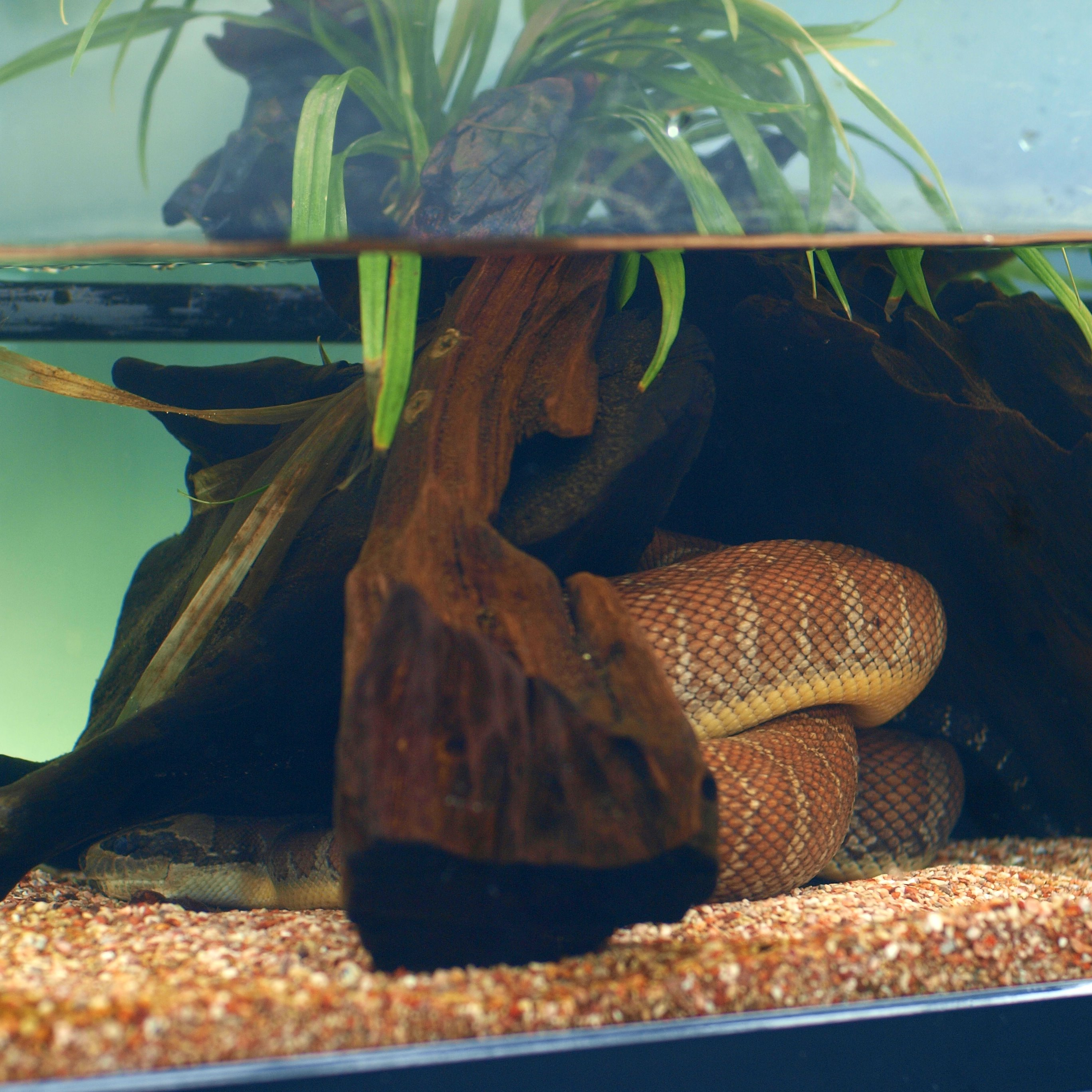
- Homalopsis buccata

Scientific classification
- Kingdom: Animalia
- Phylum: Chordata
- Class: Reptilia
- Order: Squamata
- Suborder: Serpentes
- Clade: Colubroides
- Family: Homalopsidae
- Genus: Homalopsis; Kuhl & Hasselt, 1822

Species
- 5 species (see text)

= Homalopsis =

Genus of snakes

Homalopsis is a genus of snakes of the family Homalopsidae. The genus is restricted to South East Asia and includes five currently recognized species. Like all members of the family Homalopsidae, Homalopsis are rear-fanged and mildly venomous, though considered harmless to humans.

== Habitat ==
Homalopsis are a freshwater aquatic species that are found in a wide range of habitats including ponds, rivers, flowing streams, swamps, marshes and other wetlands. Human disturbance and activity does not seem to hinder this species as much as others and can be actively found in disturbed habitat such as man-made drainage ditches and irrigated agriculture fields.

== Behavior ==
This species is nocturnal and can be found in muddy bank holes or burrows during the day. It feeds primarily on fish but may also eat anurans and possibly crustaceans.

== Reproduction ==
Homalopsis are viviparous giving birth to live young.

== Species ==
There are five species:

- Homalopsis buccata (Linnaeus, 1758)
- Homalopsis hardwickii Gray, 1842
- Homalopsis mereljcoxi Murphy, Voris, Murthy, Traub & Cumberbatch, 2012
- Homalopsis nigroventralis Deuve, 1970
- Homalopsis semizonata Blyth, 1855
