= Pythonodipsas =

Conservation status
- Least Concern (IUCN 3.1)

Scientific classification
- Kingdom: Animalia
- Phylum: Chordata
- Class: Reptilia
- Order: Squamata
- Suborder: Serpentes
- Family: Pseudaspididae
- Genus: Pythonodipsas; Günther, 1868
- Species: P. carinata

Binomial name
- Pythonodipsas carinata Günther, 1868

Genus of snakes

The western keeled snake (Pythonodipsas carinata) is a species of snake in the family Pseudaspididae. It is native to western Namibia, southwestern Angola, and southwestern Zambia, and is the only member of the genus Pythonodipsas.

== Taxonomy ==
P. carinata is most closely related to Pseudaspis cana. Together these two monotypic genera make up the subfamily Pseudaspidinae of the family Lamprophiidae.

Pythonodipsas closely resembles the colubrine genus Spalerosophis, although the two are not closely related.

== Description ==
P. carinata is unusual in possessing greatly fragmented head shields, a peculiar maxillary dentition (3rd to 6th largest, posterior-most tooth large and grooved), a reduced number of palatine teeth (including a greatly enlarged "fang"), and hypapophyses developed throughout the vertebral column. It was once thought to be a possible evolutionary intermediate between vipers and non-venomous colubroids, but it is now known not to be closely related to vipers.

== Behavior ==
P. carinata are nocturnal.

== Diet ==
P. carinata eat vertebrates, with lizards comprising 67% of the diet, rodents 25%, birds 4%, and unidentified vertebrate bones 4%. Among lizard prey, geckos (39% of all prey) and skinks (18%) predominated. Both nocturnal (Afroedura, Chondrodactylus, Palmatogecko and Pachydactylus) and diurnal geckos (Rhoptropus and Narudasia) were eaten. All skink prey were Mabuya sp. Mammalian prey were eaten primarily by larger snakes.

== Distribution and habitat ==
P. carinata is a rare snake restricted to gravel plains and arid savannah.

== Reproduction ==
P. carinata lay eggs. Females probably mature between 47.5 and 51.0 cm snout-vent length, and males between 29.0 and 31.0 cm snout-vent length. Juveniles are born at sizes between 16 and 18 cm.
