= Blythia hmuifang =

Conservation status
- Data Deficient (IUCN 3.1)

Scientific classification
- Kingdom: Animalia
- Phylum: Chordata
- Class: Reptilia
- Order: Squamata
- Suborder: Serpentes
- Family: Colubridae
- Genus: Blythia
- Species: B. hmuifang

Binomial name
- Blythia hmuifang G. Vogel, Lalremsanga & Vanlalhrima, 2017

Species of snake

The Mizoram Ground Snake (Blythia hmuifang), is a species of snake in the subfamily Natricinae of the family Colubridae of the superfamily Colubroidea. The species is endemic to Mizoram, India.

== Etymology ==
The specific name hmuifang was chosen in honor of the people of the Hmuifang village.

== Description ==
B. hmuifang can be distinguished from B. reticulata, by having fewer ventral scales (114–117) and fewer subcaudal scales in males (20–21). Smaller, younger specimens of B. hmuifang have a bright orange-red venter, and older snakes have a creamy venter.
