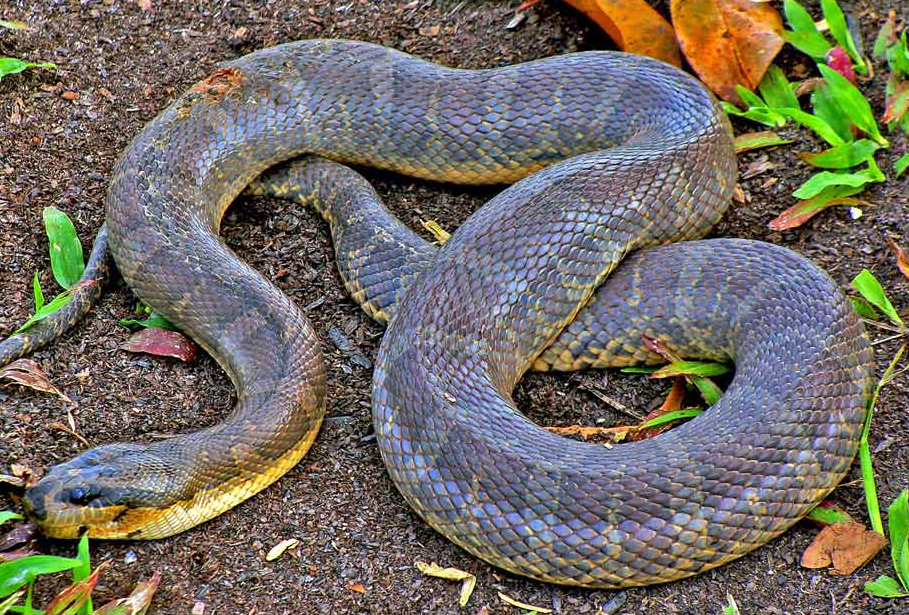

Conservation status
- Least Concern (IUCN 3.1)

Scientific classification
- Kingdom: Animalia
- Phylum: Chordata
- Class: Reptilia
- Order: Squamata
- Suborder: Serpentes
- Family: Homalopsidae
- Genus: Homalopsis; Kuhl and Hasselt, 1822
- Species: H. buccata

Binomial name
- Homalopsis buccata (Linnaeus, 1758)

= Homalopsis buccata =

Puff-faced water snake

Species of snake

Homalopsis buccata (puff-faced water snake or masked water snake) is a species of mildly venomous snake in the Homalopsidae family found in tropical areas of Southeast Asia.

== Description ==
Homalopsis buccata in movement.

Upper labials 1–4 contact single loreal; two prefrontals; 33–40 dorsal scale rows at mid-body, usually reduced to fewer than 30 posteriorly; one postocular plus a postsubocular; 12 (11–14) upper labials; ventral count fewer than 166.

Homalopsis buccata has a banded pattern and usually reaches 1 meter (3 feet) in length. They have a somewhat similar body build to the anaconda, but instead of constriction they use a mild venom from a grooved rear fang to subdue prey.

== Distribution ==
H. buccata ranges from northern Sumatra to Salanga Island, Indonesia and Borneo; it is present on the Malaysian peninsula and in extreme southern Thailand (vicinity of Pattani).

== Reproduction ==
H. buccata are ovoviviparous, meaning they do not lay eggs but rather give birth to live young. Females give birth to 2-20 live young, with an average of 9.26 young per breeding. Studies have shown this species breeds year round, with a peak season of October–March (though no distinctive breeding season was found).

== Diet ==
H. buccata prey are said to include: tilapia, guppy, catfish, Asian swamp eel, various other small fish, a variety of frogs, freshwater crustaceans.

In captivity, the species feeds readily on minnows, goldfish, various cichlid fish, tilapia, Mollies (Poecilia), and tadpoles.
