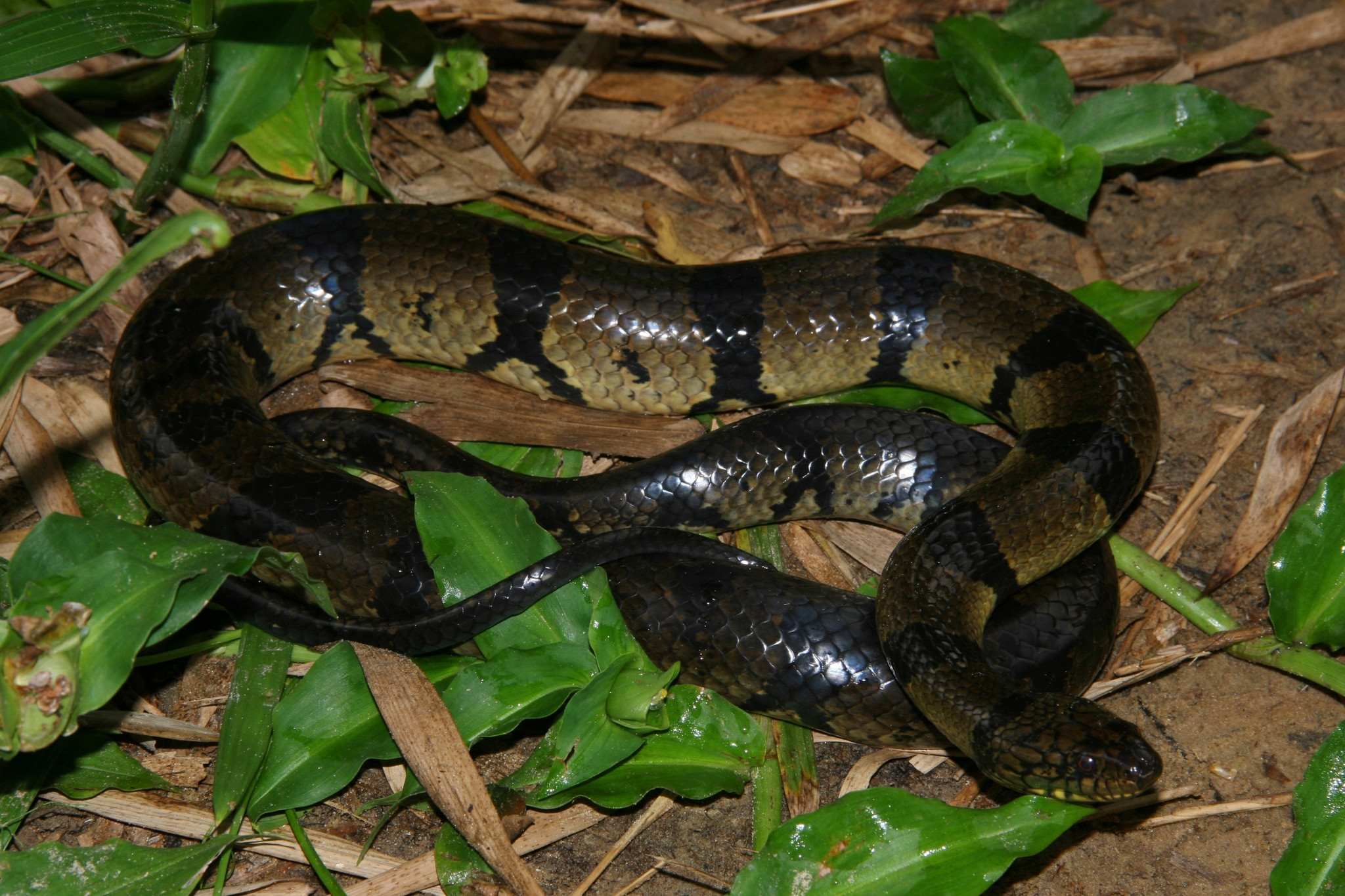

Conservation status
- Least Concern (IUCN 3.1)

Scientific classification
- Kingdom: Animalia
- Phylum: Chordata
- Class: Reptilia
- Order: Squamata
- Suborder: Serpentes
- Family: Colubridae
- Genus: Grayia
- Species: G. ornata

Binomial name
- Grayia ornata (Bocage, 1866)

= Grayia ornata =

Species of snake

Grayia ornata, the ornate African water snake, is a species of snake in the family, Colubridae. It is found in Equatorial Guinea, Cameroon, the Democratic Republic of the Congo, the Republic of the Congo, Gabon, Central African Republic, Zambia, South Sudan, and Angola.
