= Gongylosoma =

Scientific classification
- Domain: Eukaryota
- Kingdom: Animalia
- Phylum: Chordata
- Class: Reptilia
- Order: Squamata
- Suborder: Serpentes
- Family: Colubridae
- Genus: Gongylosoma; Fitzinger, 1843

Genus of snakes

Gongylosoma is a genus of snakes of the superfamily Colubroidea.

== Species ==
- Gongylosoma baliodeira (Boie, 1827) - Boie's smooth snake, striped ringneck, orange-bellied snake
- Gongylosoma longicauda (Peters, 1871) - Peters's smooth snake, long-tailed ringneck
- Gongylosoma mukutense Grismer, Das, & Leong, 2003 - Mukut smooth snake, Pulau Tioman ground snake
- Gongylosoma nicobariensis (Stoliczka, 1870) - Camorta Island stripe-necked snake
- Gongylosoma scriptum (Theobald, 1868) - common ringneck
