= Prosymna frontalis =

Scientific classification
- Kingdom: Animalia
- Phylum: Chordata
- Class: Reptilia
- Order: Squamata
- Suborder: Serpentes
- Family: Prosymnidae
- Genus: Prosymna
- Species: P. frontalis

Binomial name
- Prosymna frontalis (W. Peters, 1867)

Species of snake

Prosymna frontalis, commonly known as the south-western shovel-snout, is a species of snake native to rocky areas in South Africa, Namibia, and possibly southern Angola.

== Etymology ==
Prosymna frontalis was first described as Temnorhynchus frontalis in 1867 by Wilhelm Peters, a German naturalist and explorer. Peters named the species for the particularly large scales on its nose and head when compared to other species of shovel-snouts.

As a member of the family Prosymnidae, this species is among 19 other shovel-snouts found globally, all of which are burrowing snakes whose diet primarily consists of eggs and small lizards.

== Description ==
Prosymna frontalis adults typically measure from 20–30 cm (7.9–11.8 in), with a pattern of speckled tans, oranges, and light greys. Most individuals have thick black banding towards the head, which is flat with larger scaling seen in many burrowing snakes. These scales are somewhat reduced in P. frontalis.

== Habitat and activity ==
Notably, P. frontalis have been observed to be less fossorial than other members of their genus and more associated with rocky outcrops. They are typically active at night and after rain. These snakes are slow but effective climbers of the rocky terrain in which they live.

== Reproduction ==
Females generally lay small clutches of 2-3 elongated eggs during mid-summer, when the weather in southern Africa is hot and sunny with frequent thunderstorms. Little else is known regarding breeding habits of this species.

== Diet ==
Like other Prosymna, P. frontalis feeds largely on the eggs of snakes and lizards, most of which have soft, leathery shells. Because P. frontalis is more closely associated with rocky habitats than other Prosymna, where many geckos lay their hard-shelled eggs, they may have lost their anterior maxillary teeth to allow them to feed more easily on gecko eggs.
