= Blythia =

Scientific classification
- Kingdom: Animalia
- Phylum: Chordata
- Class: Reptilia
- Order: Squamata
- Suborder: Serpentes
- Family: Colubridae
- Genus: Blythia; Theobald, 1868

Genus of snakes

Blythia is a genus of snakes in the subfamily Natricinae of the family Colubridae of the superfamily Colubroidea. The genus, which contains two recognized species, is native to South Asia and Southeast Asia.

== Etymology ==
The genus Blythia is named in honor of English zoologist Edward Blyth.

== Species ==
The following two species are recognized as being valid.

- Blythia hmuifang G. Vogel, Lalremsanga & Vanlalhrima, 2017 – Mizoram ground snake
- Blythia reticulata (Blyth, 1854) – Blyth's reticulate snake

Nota bene: A binomial authority in parentheses indicates that the species was originally described in a genus other than Blythia.
