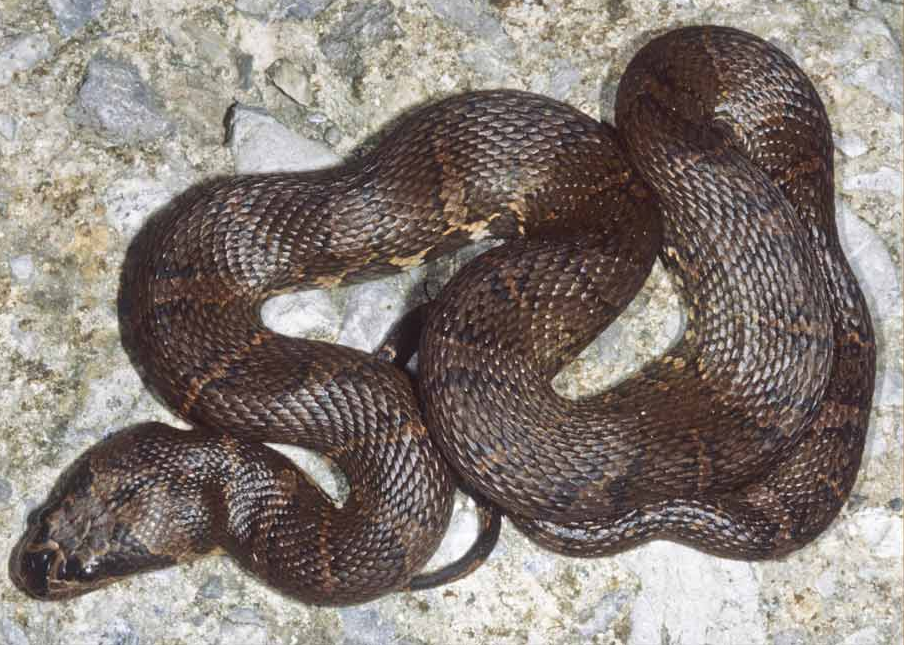

Scientific classification
- Kingdom: Animalia
- Phylum: Chordata
- Class: Reptilia
- Order: Squamata
- Suborder: Serpentes
- Family: Homalopsidae
- Genus: Homalopsis
- Species: H. nigroventralis

Binomial name
- Homalopsis nigroventralis Deuve, 1970

Synonyms
- Homalopsis buccata

= Homalopsis nigroventralis =

Deuve's water snake

Species of snake

Homalopsis nigroventralis, also known as Deuve's water snake, is a species of snake native to the Mekong River watershed of southeast Asia. They seem to prefer "streams with a moderate current, and sand and rock substrate as opposed to slow moving or stagnant water with mud substrates."
