= Gongylosoma longicauda =

Conservation status
- Least Concern (IUCN 3.1)

Scientific classification
- Kingdom: Animalia
- Phylum: Chordata
- Class: Reptilia
- Order: Squamata
- Suborder: Serpentes
- Family: Colubridae
- Genus: Gongylosoma
- Species: G. longicauda

Binomial name
- Gongylosoma longicauda (Peters, 1871)
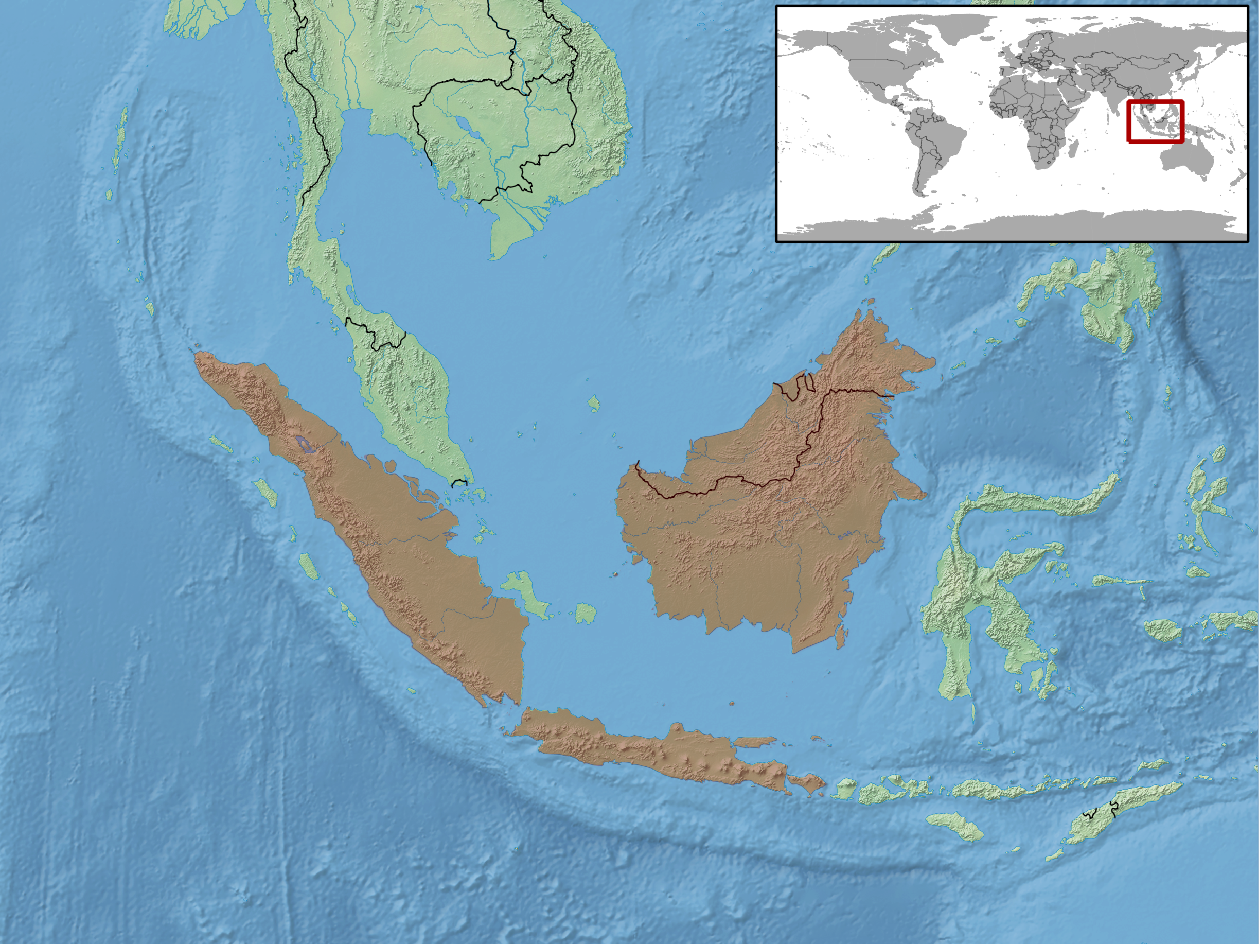

Species of snake

Gongylosoma longicauda, Peters's smooth snake or long-tailed ringneck, is a species of snake of the family Colubridae.

The snake is found in Indonesia, Brunei, Malaysia, Singapore, and Thailand.
