= Gongylosoma baliodeira =

Conservation status
- Least Concern (IUCN 3.1)

Scientific classification
- Kingdom: Animalia
- Phylum: Chordata
- Class: Reptilia
- Order: Squamata
- Suborder: Serpentes
- Family: Colubridae
- Genus: Gongylosoma
- Species: G. baliodeira

Binomial name
- Gongylosoma baliodeira (Boie, 1827)
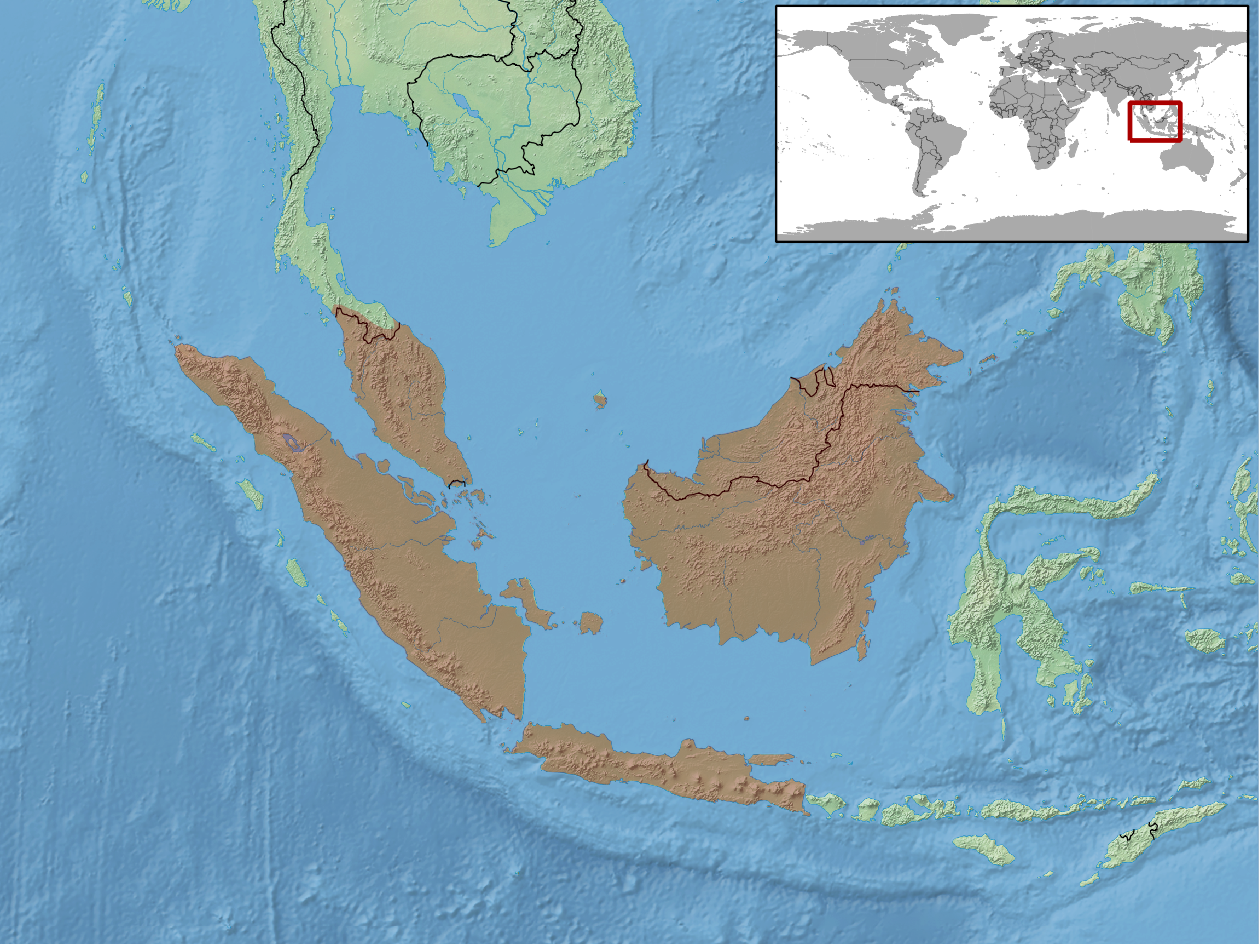

Species of snake

Gongylosoma baliodeira, Boie's smooth snake, striped ringneck, or orange-bellied snake, is a species of snake of the family Colubridae.

The snake is found in Indonesia, Brunei, Malaysia, Singapore, and Thailand. In Indonesia, it is known locally as wedit karat.
