= Grayia caesar =

Conservation status
- Least Concern (IUCN 3.1)

Scientific classification
- Kingdom: Animalia
- Phylum: Chordata
- Class: Reptilia
- Order: Squamata
- Suborder: Serpentes
- Family: Colubridae
- Genus: Grayia
- Species: G. caesar

Binomial name
- Grayia caesar (Günther, 1863)

Species of snake

Grayia caesar, Caesar's African water snake, is a species of snake in the family, Colubridae. It is found in Equatorial Guinea, Cameroon, the Democratic Republic of the Congo, the Republic of the Congo, Gabon, Central African Republic, and Angola.
