= Grayia tholloni =

Conservation status
- Least Concern (IUCN 3.1)

Scientific classification
- Kingdom: Animalia
- Phylum: Chordata
- Class: Reptilia
- Order: Squamata
- Suborder: Serpentes
- Family: Colubridae
- Genus: Grayia
- Species: G. tholloni

Binomial name
- Grayia tholloni Mocquard, 1897

Species of snake

Grayia tholloni, Tholloni's African water snake, is a species of snake in the family, Colubridae. It is found in Equatorial Guinea, the Democratic Republic of the Congo, the Republic of the Congo, Central African Republic, Zambia, Ethiopia, Sudan, South Sudan, Uganda, Kenya, Tanzania, Nigeria, Senegal, Gambia, Chad, and Angola.
