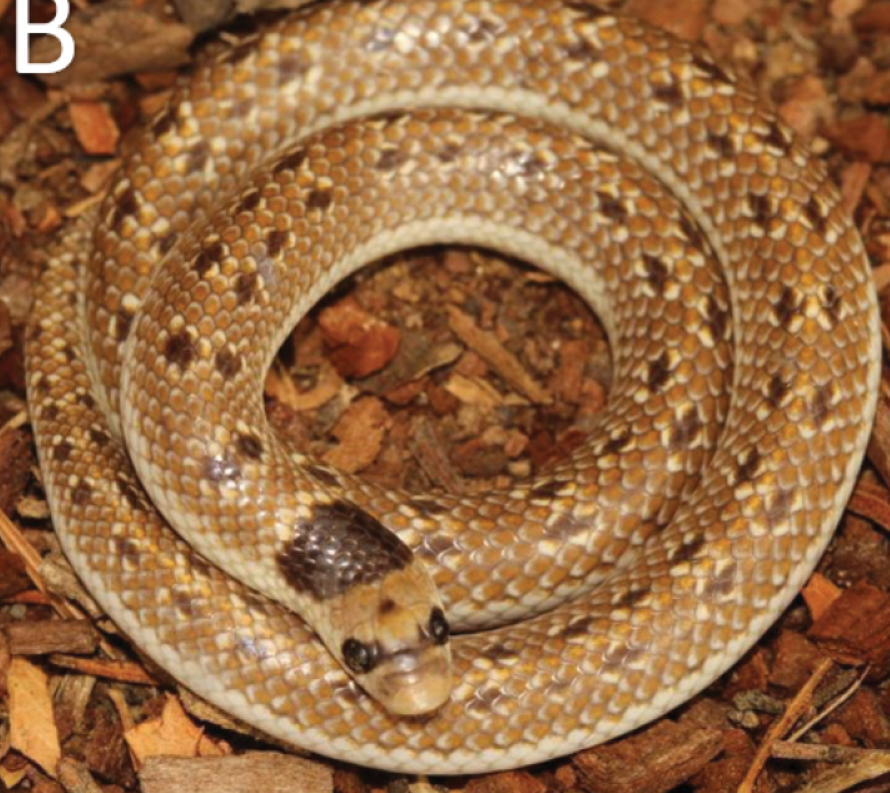

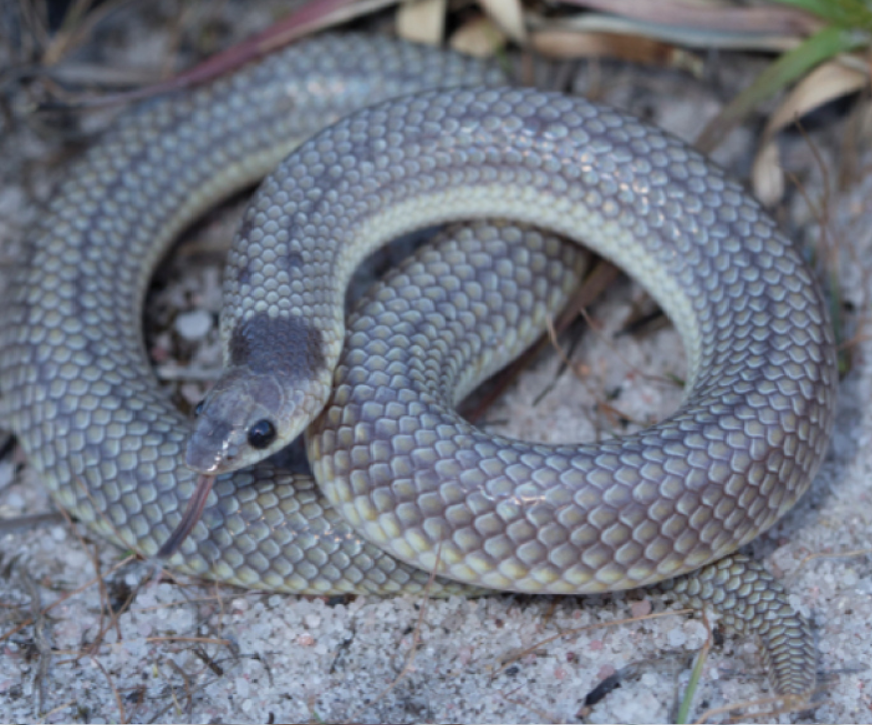

Conservation status
- Least Concern (IUCN 3.1)

Scientific classification
- Kingdom: Animalia
- Phylum: Chordata
- Class: Reptilia
- Order: Squamata
- Suborder: Serpentes
- Family: Prosymnidae
- Genus: Prosymna
- Species: P. angolensis

Binomial name
- Prosymna angolensis Boulenger 1915

= Prosymna angolensis =

Species of snake

Prosymna angolensis, commonly known as the Angolan shovel-snout snake, is a species in the family Prosymnidae native to southern Africa. Described in 1915, little is known about it other than its range and morphology.

== Morphology ==
Prosymna angolensis has a gray or tan dorsal coloration with dark spots down the back and a white ventral coloration. Snout-vent length averages 209mm for males and 224 for females The usual midbody scale row pattern is 17-25-25, and the species averages 138 ventral scales for males and 148 for females. It has one postocular scale and one preocular that separates the single prefrontal from the eyes. Its skull has reduced kinesis due to many reduced bone elements such as a reduced palatine and reduced maxilla, though the premaxilla is elongated.

== Taxonomic history ==
The species was first described in 1915 by George Boulenger. Previously, specimens were referred to as Prosymna frontalis. In 2022, Conradie et al. used morphology and DNA (3 mitochondrial and 1 nuclear gene) to separate P. angolensis into three species:

- two newly-described species:
  - Prosymna confusa, a coastal species restricted to dry habitats in southwestern Angola,
  - Prosymna lisima, an eastern species found in Kalahari sands in eastern Angola, western Zambia, and the Caprivi Strip of Namibia,
- and retaining P. angolensis for specimens collected in western Angola (overlapping with P. confusa), northeastern Namibia (including the Caprivi Strip, where it overlaps with P. lisima), northern Botswana, and eastern Zimbabwe.

The type localities of all three species are in Angola (Caconda for P. angolensis, the lake at the source of the Cuito River for P. lisima, and the edge of Bentiaba River, 20 km west of Lola for P. confusa).

=== Etymology ===
Prosymna angolensis derives its name from its initial place of discovery in Angola when it was first described in 1915. This is despite its range extending outside Angola.

== Geographical range ==
Initially recorded and often sighted in southwestern Angola, this snake is also found in Angola's Cubango River basin on the east side of the country as well as in Zimbabwe, Botswana, Namibia, and Zambia.

== Habitat ==
This species is associated with savanna with an annual rainfall of 500–1200 mm. In southwestern Angola it has been found in sandy soils in miombo woodland. Prosymna angolensis is a rarely observed species that mostly emerges to the surface only after good rains, so its distribution is incompletely known.
