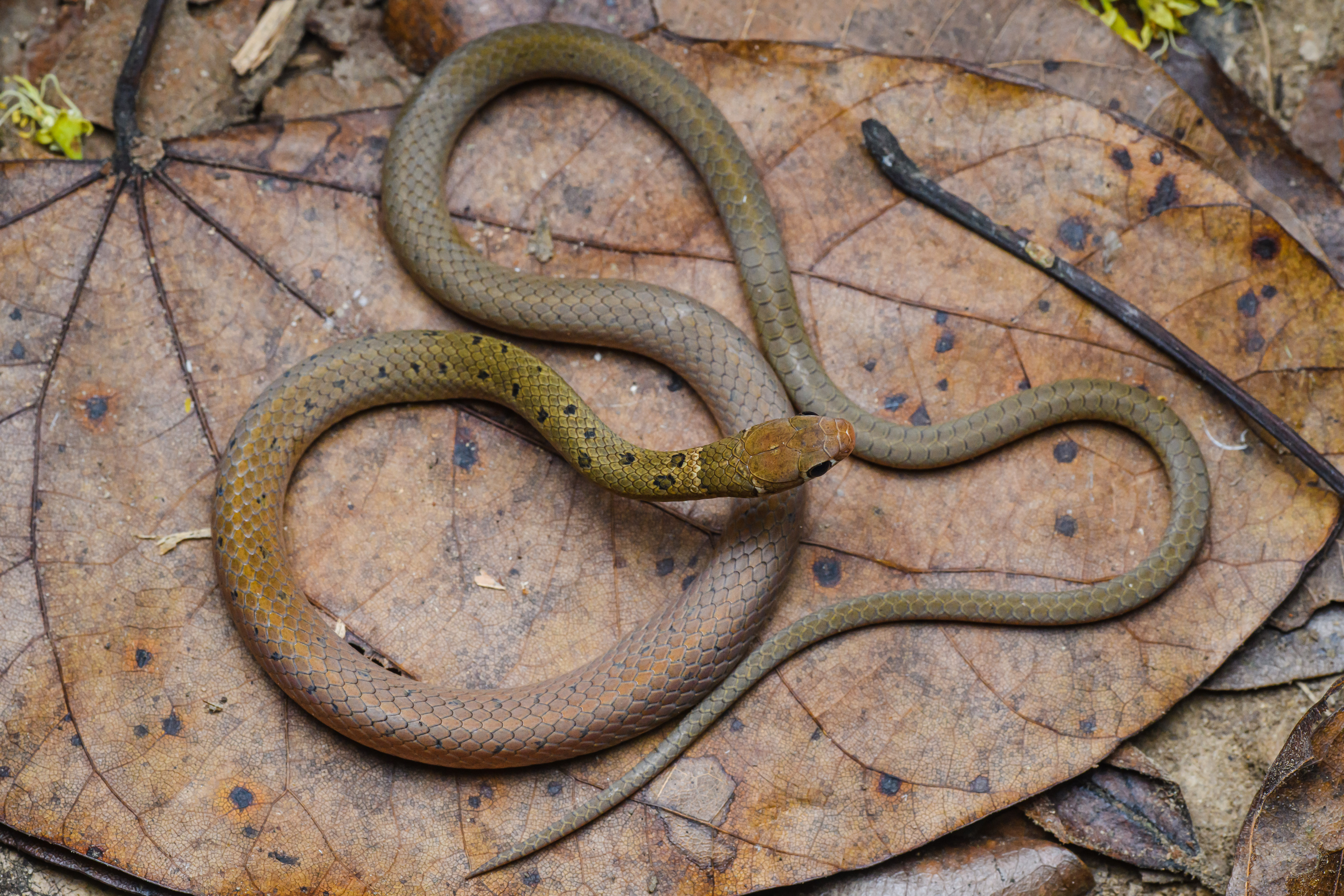

Conservation status
- Least Concern (IUCN 3.1)

Scientific classification
- Kingdom: Animalia
- Phylum: Chordata
- Class: Reptilia
- Order: Squamata
- Suborder: Serpentes
- Family: Colubridae
- Genus: Gongylosoma
- Species: G. scriptum

Binomial name
- Gongylosoma scriptum (Theobald, 1868)

= Gongylosoma scriptum =

Species of snake

Gongylosoma scriptum, the common ringneck, is a species of snake of the family Colubridae.

The snake is found in Myanmar, Cambodia, India, and Thailand.
