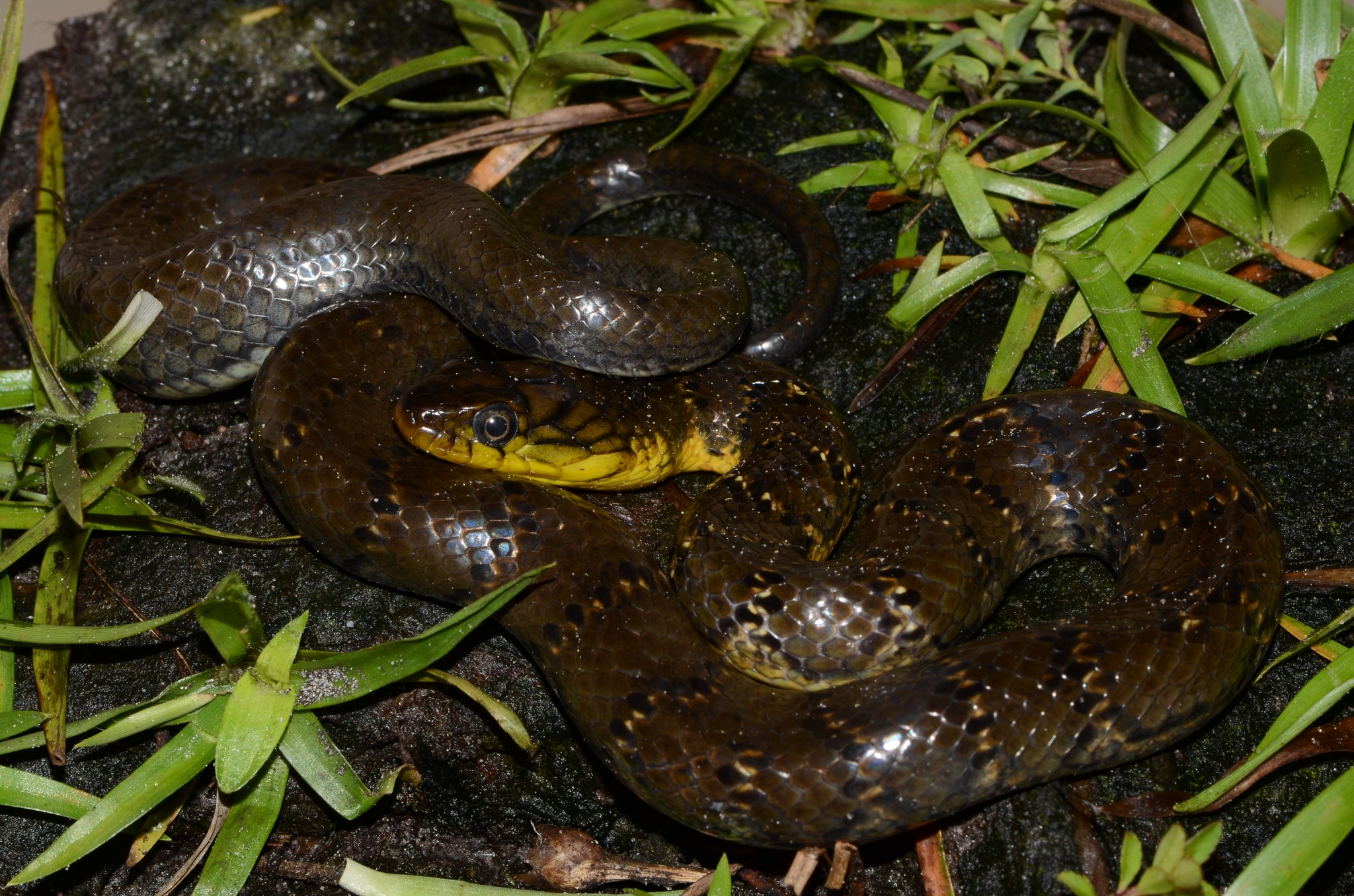

Conservation status
- Least Concern (IUCN 3.1)

Scientific classification
- Kingdom: Animalia
- Phylum: Chordata
- Class: Reptilia
- Order: Squamata
- Suborder: Serpentes
- Family: Colubridae
- Genus: Grayia
- Species: G. smithii

Binomial name
- Grayia smithii (Leach, 1818)

= Grayia smithii =

Species of snake

Grayia smithii, Smith's African water snake, is a species of snake in the family, Colubridae. It is found in Equatorial Guinea, Cameroon, the Democratic Republic of the Congo, the Republic of the Congo, Gabon, Central African Republic, Zambia, South Sudan, Uganda, Kenya, Tanzania, Rwanda, Burundi, Nigeria, Benin, Togo, Ghana, Ivory Coast, Liberia, Guinea, Guinea-Bissau, Senegal, Burkina Faso, Sierra Leone, Gambia, Niger, Chad, and Angola.
