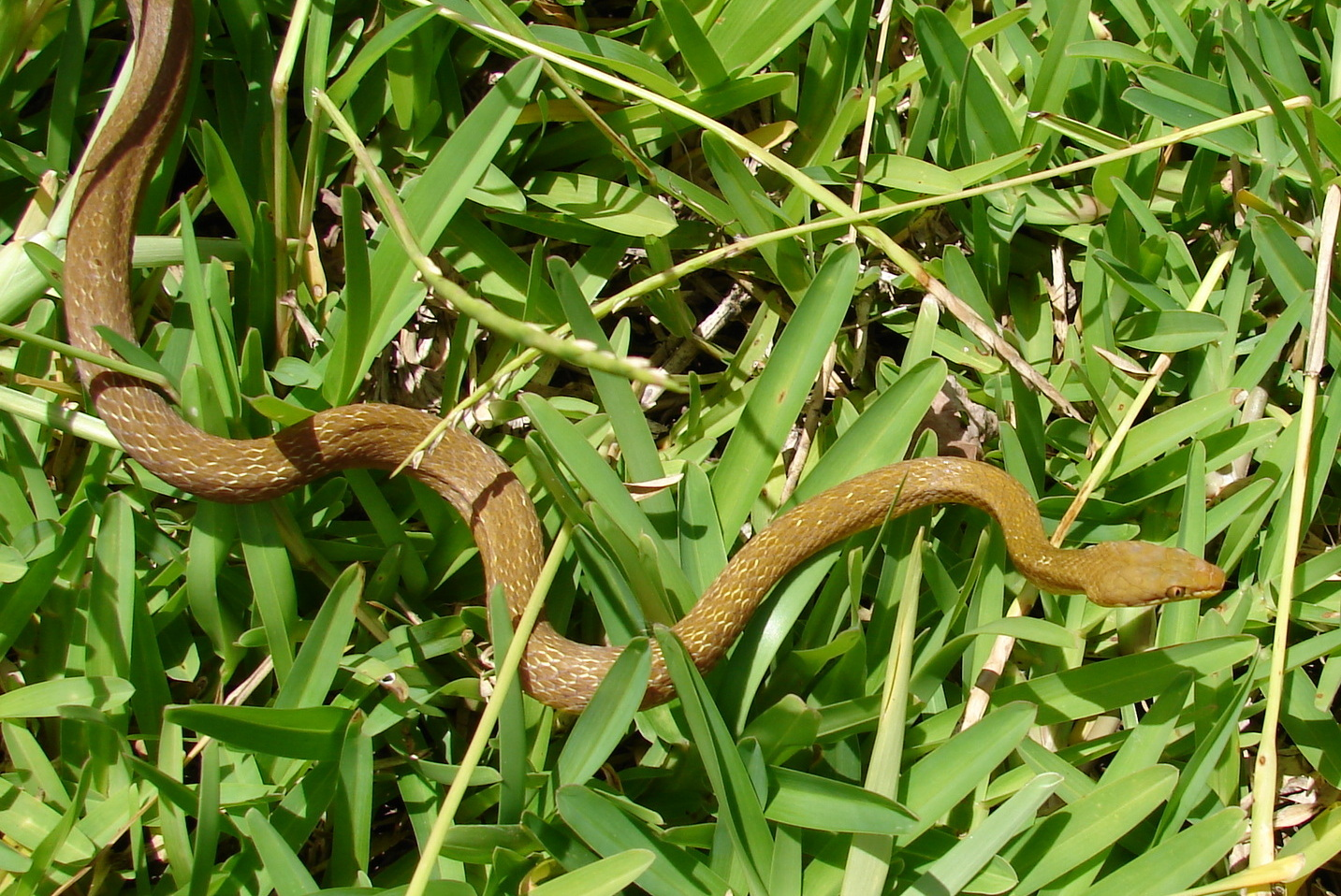

Conservation status
- Endangered (IUCN 3.1)

Scientific classification
- Kingdom: Animalia
- Phylum: Chordata
- Class: Reptilia
- Order: Squamata
- Suborder: Serpentes
- Family: Colubridae
- Genus: Lycognathophis; Boulenger, 1893
- Species: L. seychellensis

Binomial name
- Lycognathophis seychellensis (Schlegel, 1837)

Synonyms
- Psammophis seychellensis Schlegel, 1837; Scopelophis seychellensis - Fitzinger, 1843; Tropidonotus seychellensis - Duméril & Bibron, 1854; Thrasops citrinus Cope, 1868; Lycognathophis sechellensis [sic] - Boulenger, 1893

= Seychelles wolf snake =

Species of snake

The Seychelles wolf snake (Lycognathophis seychellensis) is a species of snake in the superfamily Colubroidea. It is monotypic within the genus Lycognathophis. The Neo-Latin name, Lycognathophis, is derived from the Greek words λύκος (lykos) meaning "wolf", γνάθος (gnathos) meaning "jaw", and όφις (ophis) meaning "snake", referring to the snake's dentition.

== Geographic range ==
It is endemic to Seychelles.

== Description ==
This species has 20-22 large, subequal maxillary teeth and its anterior mandibular teeth are very large, much larger than in the posterior. Its head is very distinct from the neck. The eye is moderate, with a vertically elliptic pupil but no loreal shield. Body elongate; dorsal scales keeled, with apical pits, in 17 rows. Tail long; anal divided; subcaudals paired. Ventrals 184-202; subcaudals 92-110.

Dorsally yellowish or grayish brown, uniform or with dark brown spots; dark streak on each side of head, passing through eye; upper lip yellowish, usually with brown dots; posteriorly four series of brown spots, confluent into stripes on tail. Ventrally yellowish, usually powdered or dotted with brown; a brown spot at each outer end of anterior ventrals.

Adults may attain 1 m (40 inches) in total length, with a tail 31 cm (12 inches) long.

== Habitat ==
Its natural habitats are subtropical or tropical dry forests and subtropical or tropical moist lowland forests.

== Conservation status ==
It is threatened by habitat loss.
