= Gongylosoma nicobariensis =

Conservation status
- Data Deficient (IUCN 3.1)

Scientific classification
- Kingdom: Animalia
- Phylum: Chordata
- Order: Squamata
- Suborder: Serpentes
- Family: Colubridae
- Genus: Gongylosoma
- Species: G. nicobariensis

Binomial name
- Gongylosoma nicobariensis (Stoliczka, 1870)

Synonyms
- Liopeltis nicobariensis Ablabes nicobariensis

Species of snake

Gongylosoma nicobariensis, the Camorta Island stripe-necked snake, is a species of snake found in the Nicobar Islands of India. Species known only from its holotype.

== Description ==
Rostral low, wide, not reaching the top of the head; nostril between two nasals; internasals about half the size of the prefrontals; frontal somewhat larger than the supraoculars; parietals about one fourth larger than the frontal, in contact with both post-oculars; loreal united with the postnasal; one pre- and two post-oculars; temporals short 1+2 (Smith, 1943 gives 2+2); upper labials 7, third and fourth entering the eye; both pairs of chin-shields subequal in size. Scales in 17 rows. Ventrals 189; anal 2 divided; subcaudals 87 (Smith gives 84). Anterior half of the body reddish brown above, posterior blackish grey; head above blackish, the three first labials with yellow spots; a short broad yellow streak from behind and below the eye posteriorly to the angle of the mouth; a black collar, margined on both sides with an interrupted yellow band, of which the anterior is the most distinct; an indistinct series of blackish-grey dorsal spots, almost forming a dark undulating band; sides marbled and freckled blackish grey, this colour being separated from the upper brown one by a series of closely set black spots which are partially conspicuous on the posterior part of the body: chin dusky; lower parts yellow with a vermilion tinge, each ventral with a large black spot near its outer extremity. Total length 17.3 inches; tail 4.2.

Location: Camorta in Nicobar Islands
