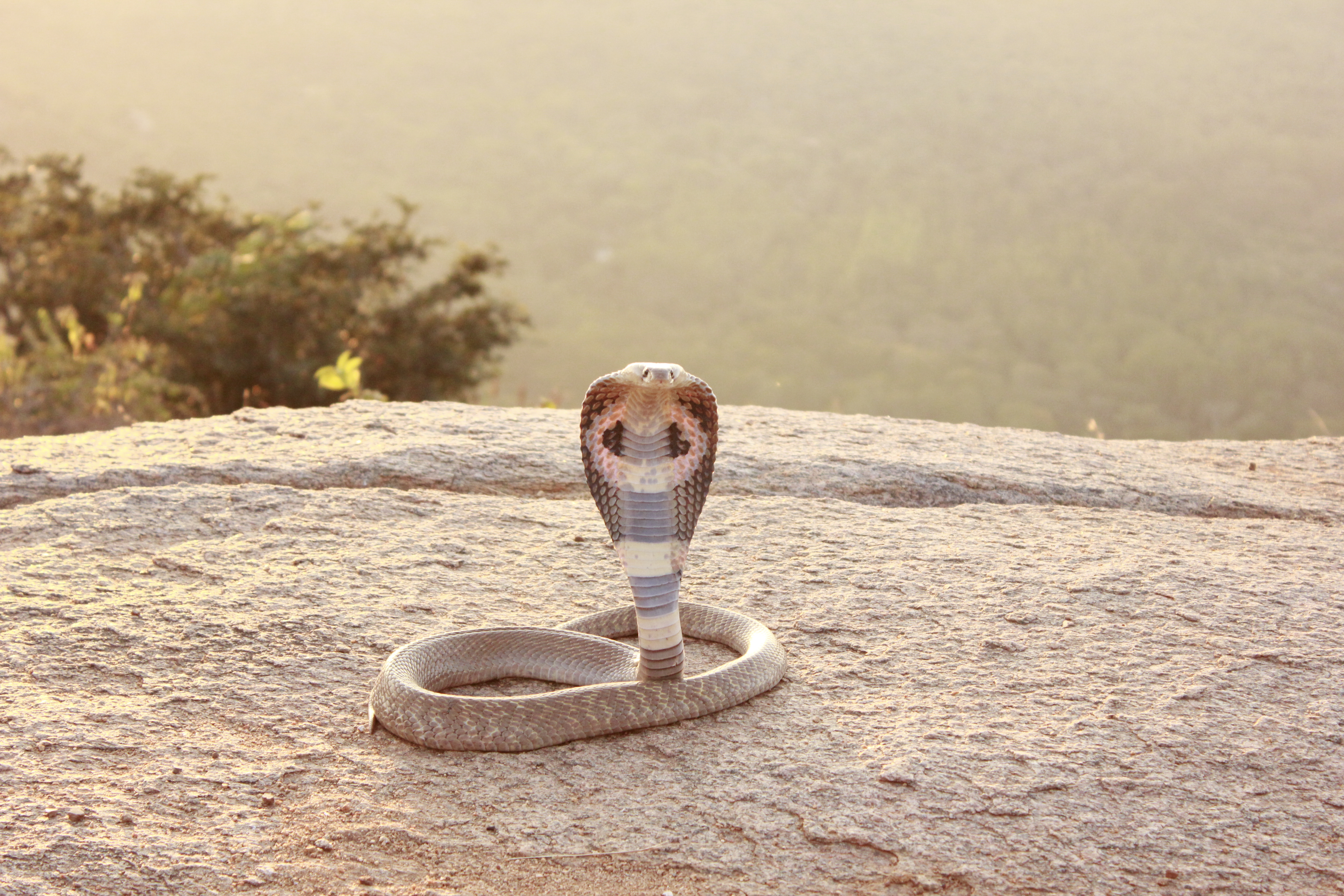
- Indian cobra (Naja naja)

Scientific classification
- Kingdom: Animalia
- Phylum: Chordata
- Class: Reptilia
- Order: Squamata
- Suborder: Serpentes
- Clade: Colubroides
- Superfamily: Elapoidea; Boie, 1827

Families and genera
- Cyclocoridae; Psammodynastidae; Elapidae (Note: The elapids in the past were considered to have two subfamilies–the Elapinae made of terrestrial species and Hydrophiinae made of the marine species. In 1997, Slowinski, Knight and Rooney found in their phylogenetic analysis using amino acid sequences from venom proteins, that the Australasian terrestrial species nested within the Hydrophiinae. This led to removing the Australasian terrestrial species and placing them in Hydrophiinae. This has been supported in subsequent recent genomic analyses, though these same studies also found the subfamily Elapinae to be paraphyletic in respect to the Hydrophiinae. These studies have found coral snakes, cobras and mambas, kraits, and African gartersnakes forming successive outgroups to Hydrophiinae. Since clade names are available for these groups with the exception of the Elapsoidea, bringing back the subfamilies Calliophiinae, Micrurinae, Najinae, and Bungarinae is ideal.); Micrelapidae; Pseudoxyrhophiidae; Psammophiidae; Atractaspididae; Pseudaspididae; Prosymnidae; Lamprophiidae; Buhoma

= Elapoidea =

Superfamily of snakes

The Elapoidea are a superfamily of snakes in the clade Colubroides, traditionally comprising the families Lamprophiidae and Elapidae. Advanced genomic sequence studies, however, have found lamprophiids to be paraphyletic in respect to elapids, and anywhere between four and nine families are now recognized.

== Taxonomy ==
In describing the subfamily Cyclocorinae, Weinell et al. (2017) suggested some or all subfamilies of Lamprophiidae should be reevaluated at full family status as a way to prevent the alternative, which is classifying them as elapids. This was followed in later studies such as Zaher et al. (2019). Alternatively, Das et al. (2023) classified Cyclocoridae, Elapidae, Micrelapidae, and Lamprophiidae as distinct families, with all other families being subfamilies of Lamprophiidae; however, the Reptile Database still retains these as distinct families.

Molecular studies suggest a rapid radiation of this superfamily within the Eocene, with all families diverging from one another by the end of the epoch. Although studies have found conflicting results, Cyclocoridae is generally considered the most basal member of the superfamily.

Below is the phylogeny of Elapoidea after Weinell et al. (2017), with the interrelations of Elapid after Lee et al. (2016) and Figueroa et al. (2016):

- Elapoidea
  - Prosymnidae
  - - Buhoma
    - - Psammophiidae
        - Pseudaspidinae
        - Psammophiinae
      - - - Lamprophiidae
            - Pseudoxyrhophiinae
            - - Micrelapiinae
              - - Psammodynastiinae
                - Lamprophiinae
          - - Elapidae
              - Calliophiinae
              - - Micrurinae
                - - Najinae
                  - - Bungarinae
                    - - Elapsoidea
                      - Hydrophiinae
            - Atractaspididae
              - Cyclocorinae
              - Atractaspidinae

An alternative phylogeny was found by Das et al. (2023) and Das et al. (2024), subsuming many families into subfamilies of Lamprophiidae:

- Elapoidea
  - Cyclocoridae
  - - Psammodynastidae
    - - Elapidae
      - - Micrelapidae
        - Lamprophiidae
          - - Pseudoxyrhophiinae
            - - Psammophiinae
              - - Atractaspidinae
                - - Pseudaspininae
                  - - Prosymninae
                    - Lamprophiinae

Families and subfamilies:

- Family: Cyclocoridae Weinell & Brown, 2017 – Philippine snakes
- Family: Psammodynastidae S. Das et al., 2024 – mock vipers
- Family: Elapidae F. Boie, 1827 – cobras, coral snakes, mambas, taipans, sea snakes, and others
  - Calliophiinae – old world coral snakes
  - Micrurinae – new world coral snakes
  - Najinae – cobras
  - Bungarinae
  - Hydrophiinae Fitzinger, 1843 – sea snakes and taipans
- Family: Pseudaspididae Cope, 1893 – mole snake and western keeled snake
- Family: Prosymnidae Gray, 1849 – shovel-snouted snakes
- Family: Psammophiidae Bourgeois, 1968 – sand snakes and allies
- Family: Micrelapidae S. Das et al., 2023 – two-headed snakes
- Family: Atractaspididae Günther, 1858 – African burrowing asps, stiletto snakes, harlequin snakes
  - Atractaspidinae Günther, 1858
  - Aparallactinae Bourgeois, 1968
- Family: Pseudoxyrhophiidae Dowling, 1975 – Malagasy hognose snakes, brook snakes, and allies
  - Amplorhininae Meirte, 1992
  - Pseudoxyrhophiinae Dowling, 1975
- Family: Lamprophiidae Fitzinger, 1843 – lamprophiids
