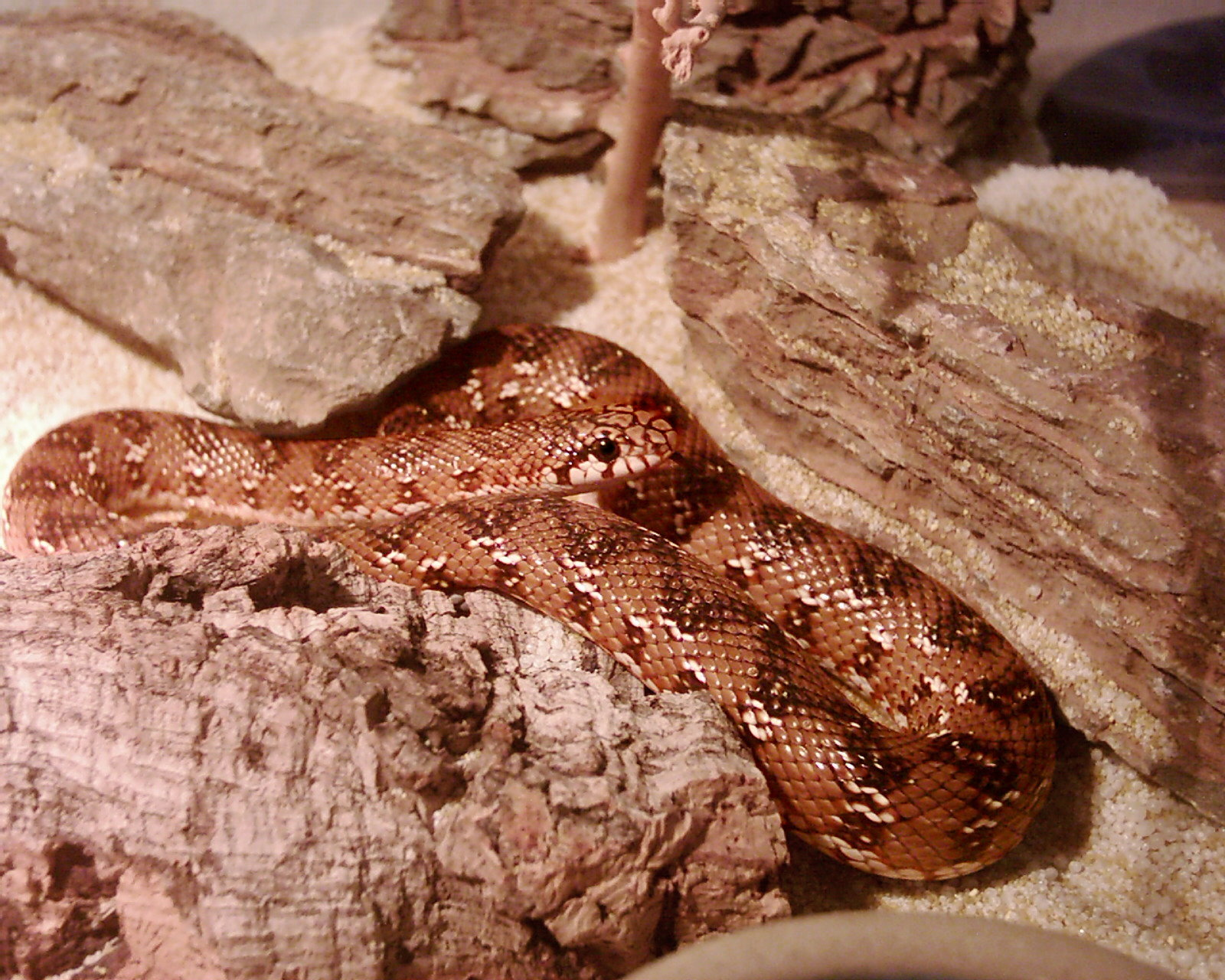
- Pseudaspis cana

Scientific classification
- Kingdom: Animalia
- Phylum: Chordata
- Class: Reptilia
- Order: Squamata
- Suborder: Serpentes
- Superfamily: Elapoidea
- Family: Pseudaspididae; Cope, 1893

Genera
- Pseudaspis Fitzinger, 1843; Pythonodipsas Günther, 1868

= Pseudaspididae =

Family of snakes

Pseudaspididae is a small family of elapoid snakes, containing only two species (each in their own monotypic genus) from sub-Saharan Africa. They were formerly placed as a subfamily of the Lamprophiidae, but have been more recently identified as a distinct family. However, some authors continue to place them as a subfamily of the Lamprophiidae.

The Asian mock vipers in the genus Psammodynastes were previously placed as disjunct members of this family, but more recent studies support them being a significantly older lineage belonging to their own family, Psammodynastidae.

== Genera ==
The family contains two species in two genera.

- Pseudaspis Fitzinger, 1843
  - Pseudaspis cana (Linnaeus, 1758) (mole snake)
- Pythonodipsas Günther, 1868
  - Pythonodipsas carinata Günther, 1868 (western keeled snake)
