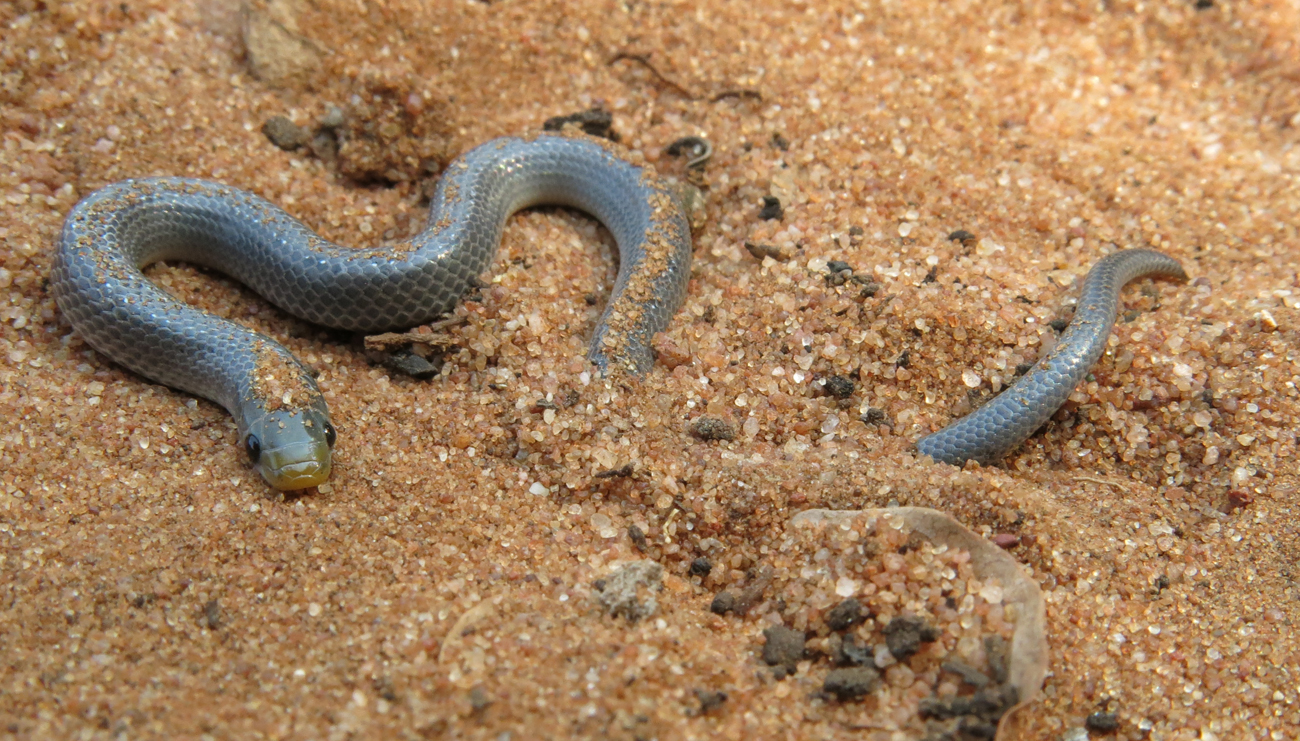
- A hatchling Prosymna stuhlmanni from Segole, Limpopo, South Africa.

Scientific classification
- Kingdom: Animalia
- Phylum: Chordata
- Class: Reptilia
- Order: Squamata
- Suborder: Serpentes
- Superfamily: Elapoidea
- Family: Prosymnidae; Kelly, Barker, Villet & Broadley, 2009
- Genus: Prosymna; Gray, 1849

= Prosymna (snake) =

Genus of snakes

Prosymna is a genus of elapoid snake. It is the only genus in the family Prosymnidae. They were formerly placed as a subfamily of the Lamprophiidae, but have been more recently identified as a distinct family.

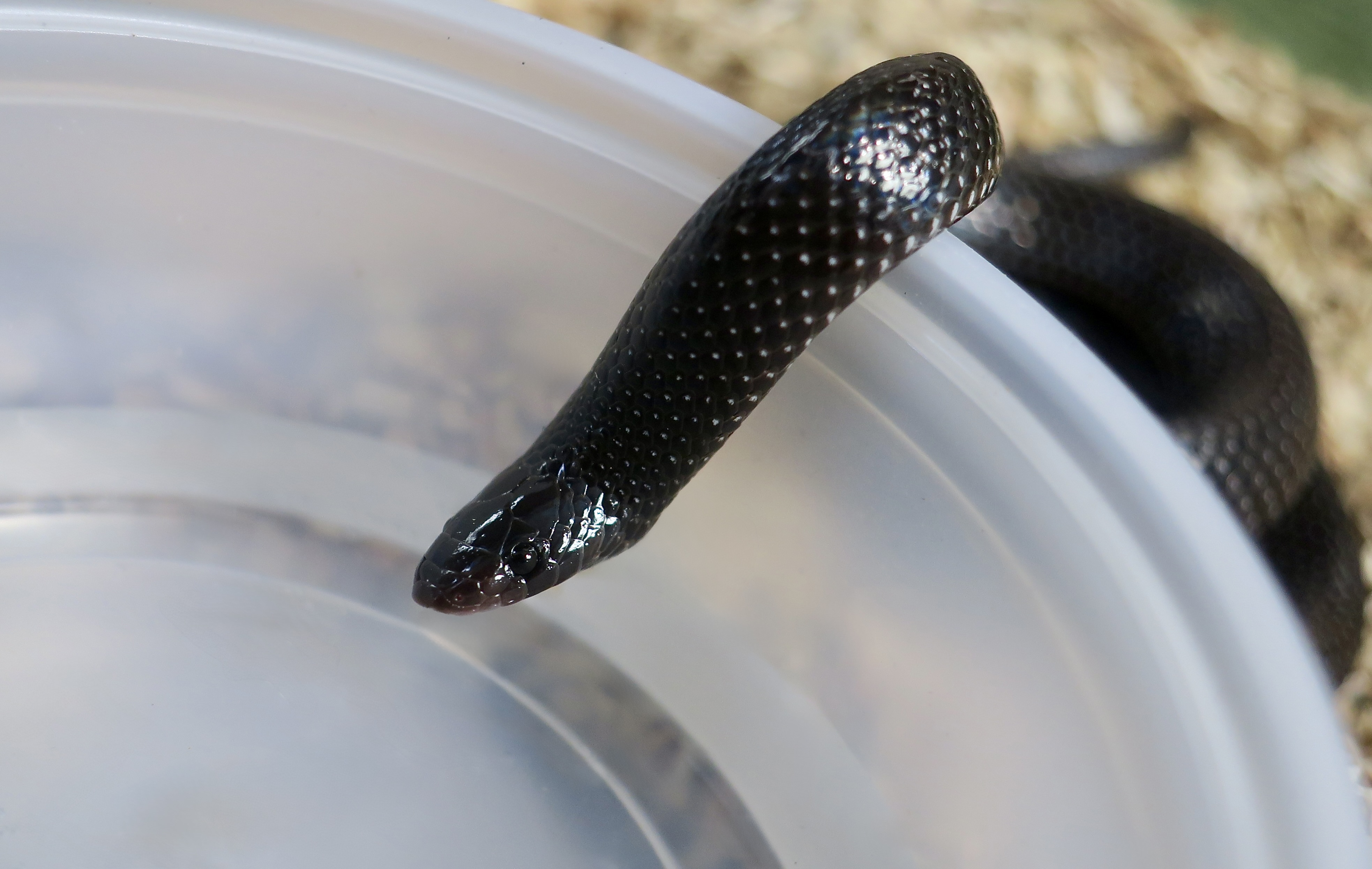
A Ghana shovel-snout snake (Prosymna meleagris) at LLL Reptiles, a reptile store in Henderson, Nevada.

== Geographic range ==
The genus Prosymna is endemic to Sub-Saharan Africa.

== Species ==
- Prosymna ambigua Bocage, 1873
- Prosymna angolensis Boulenger, 1915
- Prosymna bivittata F. Werner, 1903
- Prosymna confusa Conradie, Keates, Baptista & Lobón-Rovira, 2022 – plain shovel-snout snake
- Prosymna frontalis (W. Peters, 1867)
- Prosymna greigerti Mocquard, 1906
- Prosymna janii Bianconi, 1862
- Prosymna lineata (W. Peters, 1871)
- Prosymna lisima Conradie, Keates, Baptista & Lobón-Rovira, 2022 – Kalahari shovel-snout snake
- Prosymna meleagris (J.T. Reinhardt, 1843)
- Prosymna ornatissima Barbour & Loveridge, 1928
- Prosymna pitmani Battersby, 1951
- Prosymna ruspolii (Boulenger, 1896)
- Prosymna semifasciata Broadley, 1995
- Prosymna somalica H. Parker, 1930
- Prosymna stuhlmanni (Pfeffer, 1893)
- Prosymna sundevalli (A. Smith, 1849)
- Prosymna visseri V. FitzSimons, 1959

Nota bene: A binomial authority in parentheses indicates that the species was originally described in a genus other than Prosymna.
