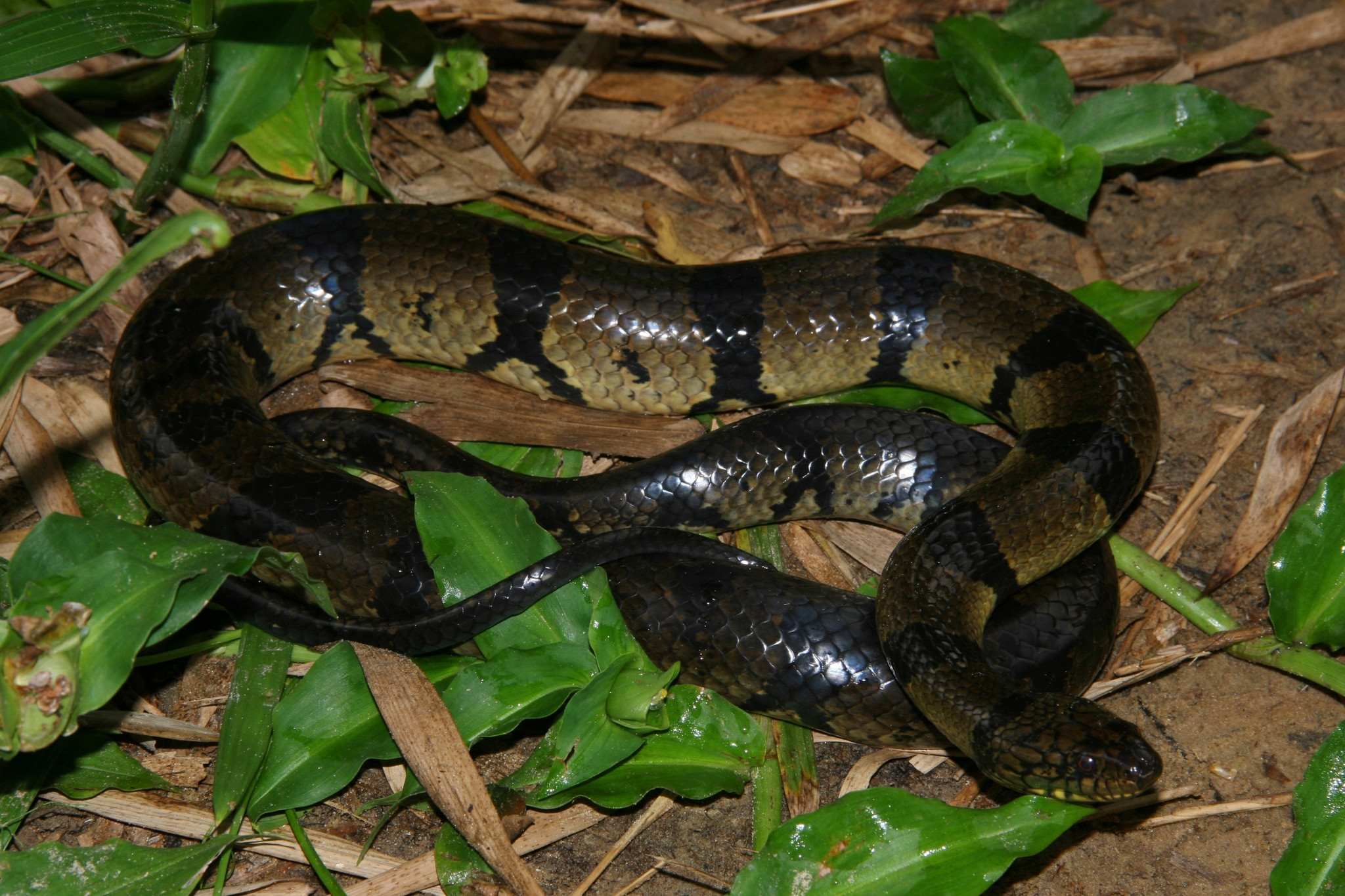
- Grayia ornata

Scientific classification
- Kingdom: Animalia
- Phylum: Chordata
- Class: Reptilia
- Order: Squamata
- Suborder: Serpentes
- Family: Colubridae
- Subfamily: Grayiinae; Vidal, Delmas, David, Cruaud, Couloux & Hedges, 2007
- Genus: Grayia; Günther, 1858

Species
- Four, see article.

= Grayia (snake) =

Genus of snakes

Grayia is a genus of snakes, commonly referred to as African water snakes, in the family Colubridae. The genus, which is native to tropical Africa, is the only genus in the colubrid subfamily Grayiinae.

Grayia species are relatively poorly known snakes, at least to herpetologists. Although they are locally abundant, they are notoriously difficult to catch, and occur in areas where field work is difficult. They inhabit seasonal rainforest swamps, streams, and permanent water bodies, eat fish and frogs, and lay eggs in the leaf litter among humid enclosures formed by buttress roots during the dry season. They are unusual in that they deposit their clutch in small batches of three or four eggs at different times at more than one nest site, rather than laying all the eggs at once, a strategy used by some turtles to avoid nest predation, but otherwise undocumented in snakes.

At least one species, G. ornata, is used for food and in medicine by people in Gabon, and evidently is known to them to be nonvenomous; a person who has been bitten by a Grayia snake is believed to be protected for life against bites from other snakes.

== Description ==
Snakes of the genus Grayia primarily come in very dark colors as to blend in with the forest ground and water. They are medium to large snakes, 1–1.5 m (3.3–4.9 ft) in total length (tail included), and the tail is 30% or more of the total length, depending on the species.

== Etymology ==
The generic name, Grayia, is in honor of British herpetologist John Edward Gray, who coined many commonly used generic names. The specific name smythii is in honor of Norwegian botanist Christen Smith. The specific name tholloni is in honor of François-Romain Thollon (1855–1896), who was a French collector of natural history specimens in Africa.

== Species ==
These four species are recognized as being valid:

- Grayia caesar (Günther, 1863) – Caesar's African water snake
- Grayia ornata (Bocage, 1866) – ornate African water snake
- Grayia smithii (Leach, 1818) – Smith's African water snake
- Grayia tholloni Mocquard, 1897 – Tholloni's African water snake

Nota bene: A binomial authority in parentheses indicates that the species was originally described in a genus other than Grayia.
