= Buhoma =

Scientific classification
- Kingdom: Animalia
- Phylum: Chordata
- Class: Reptilia
- Order: Squamata
- Suborder: Serpentes
- Superfamily: Elapoidea
- Genus: Buhoma; Ziegler, Vences, Glaw, & Böhme, 1997

Genus of snakes

Buhoma is a genus of snakes in the superfamily Elapoidea. The genus is endemic to Africa.

It was formerly classified in the family Lamprophiidae, but following the split of that family, the taxonomic placement of Buhoma remains uncertain.

== Species ==
Three species are recognized as being valid.

- Buhoma depressiceps (F. Werner, 1897) – pale-headed forest snake
- Buhoma procterae (Loveridge, 1922) – Uluguru forest snake
- Buhoma vauerocegae (Tornier, 1902) – Usambara forest snake

A binomial authority in parentheses indicates that the species was originally described in a genus other than Buhoma.
