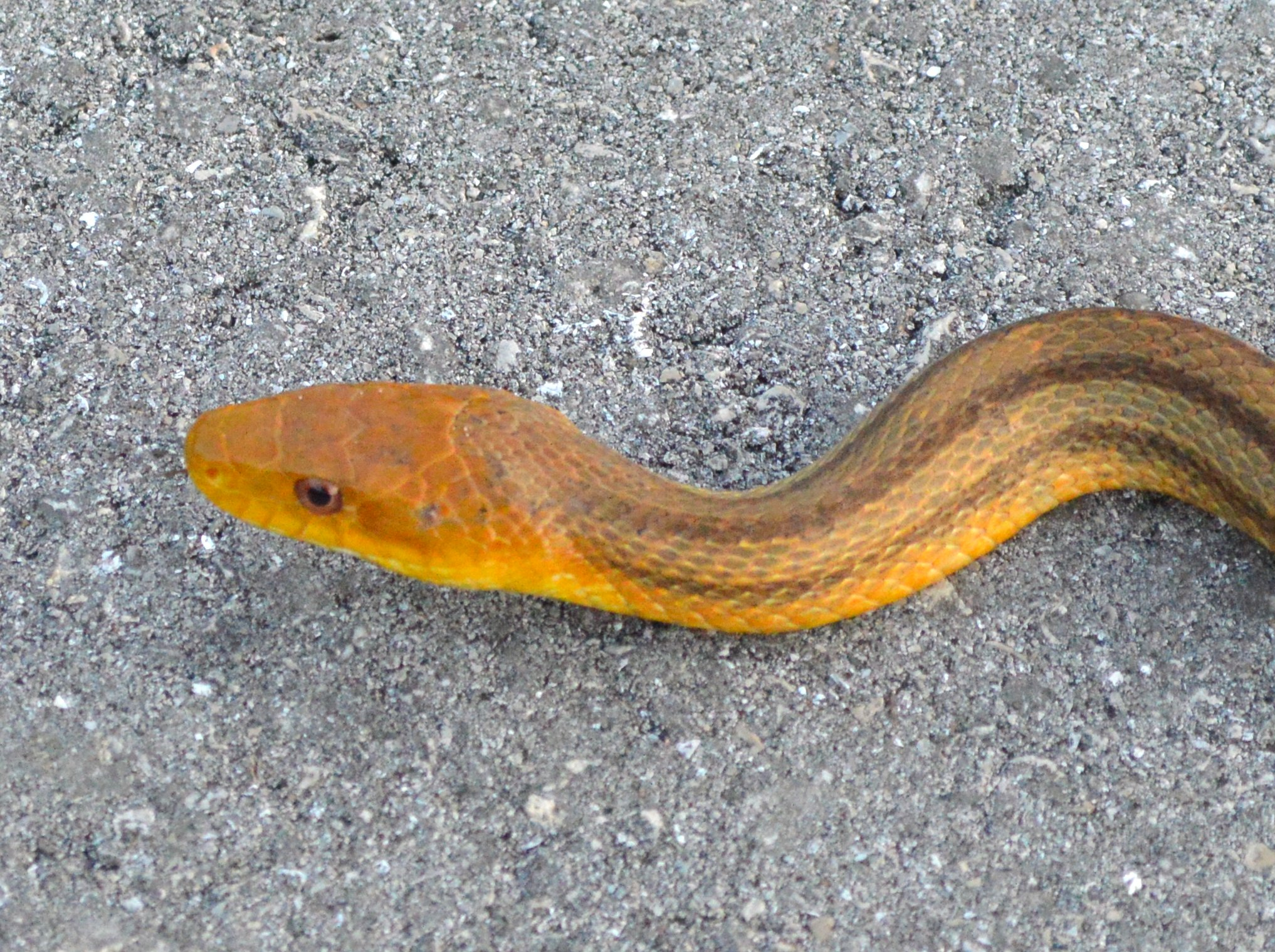
- Eastern ratsnake (Pantherophis alleghaniensis)

Scientific classification
- Kingdom: Animalia
- Phylum: Chordata
- Class: Reptilia
- Order: Squamata
- Suborder: Serpentes
- Clade: Colubroides
- Superfamily: Colubroidea; Oppel, 1811

Families
- Colubridae (Sibynophiinae, Dipsadinae, and Natricinae are considered distinct by some studies); Incertae sedis; †Sardophis

= Colubroidea =

Superfamily of snakes

Colubroidea is a superfamily of snakes in the clade Colubroides that includes Colubridae, with some studies splitting Colubridae into multiple families that make up Colubroidea. Historically, Colubroidea also included other caenophidian snakes such as cobras and vipers, as these snakes form a clade. However these groups are now divided into several distinct, but related, families. Zaher et al. (2009) proposed to redefine Colubroidea for colubrids and related families, while designating Colubroides as the group containing vipers and cobras as well as colubroids. The ReptileDatabase considers Colubroidea to be composed of Colubridae and the members of its sister group, Elapoidea, and does not recognize the division of Colubridae into multiple families.

== Classification ==
Phylogeny

- Colubroidea
  - Colubridae
    - - Grayiinae
      - Calamariinae
    - - Ahaetuliinae
      - Colubrinae
  - - - Sibynophiidae
      - Natricidae
    - - Pseudoxenodontidae
      - - Dipsadidae
          - Carphophiinae
          - - Xenodontinae
            - Dipsadinae

Families and Subfamilies

Usual taxonomy:

- Family: Colubridae Oppel, 1811
  - Subfamily: Grayiinae Günther, 1858
  - Subfamily: Calamariinae Bonaparte, 1838
  - Subfamily: Ahaetullinae Figueroa, McKelvy, Grismer, Bell & Lailvaux, 2016
  - Subfamily: Colubrinae Oppel, 1811
  - Subfamily: Sibynophiinae Dunn, 1928
  - Subfamily: Natricidae Bonaparte, 1838
  - Subfamily: Pseudoxenodontidae McDowell, 1987
  - Subfamily: Xenodontinae Dunn, 1928
  - Subfamily: Dipsadinae Bonaparte, 1838

Alternate taxonomy:

- Family: Sibynophiidae Dunn, 1928
- Family: Natricidae Bonaparte, 1838
- Family: Pseudoxenodontidae McDowell, 1987
- Family: Dipsadidae Bonaparte, 1838
  - Subfamily: Carphophiinae Zaher et al., 2009
  - Subfamily: Xenodontinae Dunn, 1928
  - Subfamily: Dipsadinae Bonaparte, 1838
- Family: Colubridae Oppel, 1811
  - Subfamily: Grayiinae Günther, 1858
  - Subfamily: Calamariinae Bonaparte, 1838
  - Subfamily: Ahaetullinae Figueroa, McKelvy, Grismer, Bell & Lailvaux, 2016
  - Subfamily: Colubrinae Oppel, 1811

Unknown Genera incertae sedis (not currently placed in a family, usually because of the absence of genetic data, but suspected to be colubroids based on morphology)

- Blythia
- Elapoidis
- Gongylosoma
- Lycognathophis
- Oreocalamus
- †Paraxenophis
- †Periergophis
- Poecilopholis
- Tetralepis

== Fossil Colubroidea ==
=== North America ===
Mexico

Locations of Colubroidea fossil finds in Mexico
Cueva de Abra Travertine
Goleta Formation#
Las Tunas Wash; Jeffries Site

| Find | NALMA | Formation | Notes | Refs |
|---|---|---|---|---|
| Colubrinae indet. | Pleistocene | Cueva de Abra Travertine | Described from Cueva de Abra Travertine in Tamaulipas. Dalquest, WW; Roth, E (1970). "Late Pleistocene mammals from a cave in Tamaulipas, Mexico". Southwestern Naturalist. 15 (2): 217–230. | |
| ?Pituophis sp. | Blancan | | Described from Las Tunas Wash; Jeffries Site in Baja California Sur. Miller, WE (1980). "The Late Pliocene Las Tunas Local Fauna from Southernmost Baja California, Mexico". Journal of Paleontology. 54 (4): 762–805. | |
| Lampropeltis intermedius | Blancan | Goleta | Described from locality in Michoacán. Repenning, CA (1962). "The Giant Ground Squirrel Paenemarmota". Journal of Paleontology. 36 (3): 540–556. | |

=== South America ===
Locations of Colubroidea fossil finds in South America
Pleisto-Holocene ages
Pliocene ages
Miocene ages

Legend

- Age - bold is type age (SALMA)
- Formation - bold is Lagerstätte

| Find | SALMA | Basin | Formation | Country | Notes | Refs |
|---|---|---|---|---|---|---|
| "Colubroidea sp." sic | Laventan | VSM | Villavieja | Colombia | Described from same Los Mangos Fishbed in Huila; Colombophis portai and Eunectes stirtoni by R. Hoffstetter and J.-C. Rage. 1977. Le gisement de vertébrés Miocènes de La Venta (Colombie) et sa faune de serpents. Annales de Paléontologie (Vertébrés) 63(2):161-190 | |
| indet. | ChasicoanMayoanLaventan | Solimões | Solimões | Brazil | Described from Talismã, upper Purus River locality in Amazonas; the snakes Colombophis spinosus, aff. Epicrates sp., Eunectes sp., the turtle Chelonoidis sp., crocodylians Acresuchus pachytemporalis and Caiman brevirostris, lizard cf. Paradracaena sp., and many mammals by Cozzuol, Mario Alberto (2006), "The Acre vertebrate fauna: Age, diversity, and geography", Journal of South American Earth Sciences, 21 (3): 185–203, Bibcode:2006JSAES..21..185C, doi:10.1016/j.jsames.2006.03.005 | |
| Colubrinae indet. | Holocene | Subandean Belt | Ñuapua | Bolivia | Described from Ñuapua 2 locality in Chuquisaca; snakes Tupinambis teguixin, Boidae indet., Crotalidae indet., turtles, frogs Leptodactylus cf. ocellatus, Bufo cf. paracnemis, birds Crypturellus tataupa, Podiceps minor, Podiceps auritus cornutus, Platalea ajaja, Rhea cf. Americana, Anas sp., Coccyzus sp., Dendrocygna sp., Jacana sp., Nyctibius sp., Platalea sp., cf. Rhynchotus sp., Columbidae indet., Falconidae indet., Passeriformes indet., Rallidae indet., fossils of Tolypeutus matacus, Ceratrophrys cf. ornata, and Leposternon sp., and many mammals including Homo sapiens by Marshall, Larry G.; Sempere, Thierry (1991), "The Eocene to Pleistocene vertebrates of Bolivia and their stratigraphic context: A review", Revista técnica de YPFB, 12: 631–652 | |
| indet. | Chapadmalalan | Sierras de Córdoba | Brochero | Argentina | Described from Valle de Traslasierra - Paso del Río Arriba and Pedernara Cliffs locality in Córdoba; with Rhinella cf. arenarum, R. cf. spinulosa, Teius sp., ?Liolaemus sp., Iguanidae indet. and the mammals Chukimys favaloroi and Echimyidae indet. by L. E. Cruz, J. C. Fernicola, and C. A. Carignano. 2018. New Vertebrates of the Brochero Formation (Córdoba, Argentina): A Review of the Pliocene of Central Argentina. Journal of Mammalian Evolution 25:315-326 | |
| indet. | Chasicoan | Colorado | Cerro Azul | Argentina | Described from Cerro La Bota locality in La Pampa; reported with many mammal fossils by Verzi, Diego H.; Montalvo, Claudia I.; Deschamps, Cecilia M. (2008), "Biostratigraphy and biochronology of the Late Miocene of central Argentina: Evidence from rodents and taphonomy", Geobios, 41: 145–155, Bibcode:2008Geobi..41..145V, doi:10.1016/j.geobios.2006.09.005 | |
| indet. | Montehermosan | Claromecó | Monte Hermoso | Argentina | From several localities in Buenos Aires; reported by R. L. Tomassini, C. I. Montalvo, C.M. Deschamps and T. Manera. 2013. Biostratigraphy and biochronology of the Monte Hermoso Formation (early Pliocene) at its type locality, Buenos Aires Province, Argentina. Journal of South American Earth Sciences 48:31-42 and C. M. Deschamps, G. I. Esteban, and M. S. Bargo. 2001. El registro más antiguo del género Lestodon Gervais, 1855 (Xenarthra, Tardigrada, Mylodontidae) (Montehermosense, Plioceno Temprano). Ameghiniana 38(2):151-156 | |
| indet. | Colhuehuapian | Golfo San Jorge | Trelew Mb of Sarmiento | Argentina | Described from same Gaiman locality in Chubut; Gaimanophis tenuis, Waincophis sp., the turtle Chelonoidis gringorum and many mammals by A. M. Albino. 1996. Snakes from the Miocene of Patagonia (Argentina) Part I: The Booidea. Neues Jahrbuch für Geologie und Paläontologie, Abhandlungen 199(3):417-434 | |
| indet. | Santacrucian | Austral | Rio Pinturas | Argentina | From Río Pinturas locality in Santa Cruz; reported by A. M. Albino. 1996. Snakes from the Miocene of Patagonia (Argentina) Part II: The Colubroidea. Neues Jahrbuch für Geologie und Paläontologie, Abhandlungen 200(3):353-360 | |
| indet. | Santacrucian | Austral | Santa Cruz | Argentina | Sole reptile described from Santa Cruz Formation locality in Santa Cruz together with the terror birds Psilopterus bachmanni, P. lemoinei, Phororhacos longissimus, Patagornis marshi, Brontornis burmeisteri, penguin Paraptenodytes antarcticus and other birds Eoneornis australis, Eutelornis patagonicus, Anisolornis excavatus, Protibis cnemialis, Opisthodactylus patagonicus, Liptornis hesternus, and many mammals by A. M. Albino. 1996. Snakes from the Miocene of Patagonia (Argentina) Part II: The Colubroidea. Neues Jahrbuch für Geologie und Paläontologie, Abhandlungen 200(3):353-360 & Vizcaíno, Sergio F.; Kay, Richard F.; Bargo, Susana (2012), Early Miocene Paleobiology in Patagonia: High-Latitude Paleocommunities of the Santa Cruz Formation, Cambridge University Press, pp. 1–370, ISBN 978-0-521-19461-7 | |
