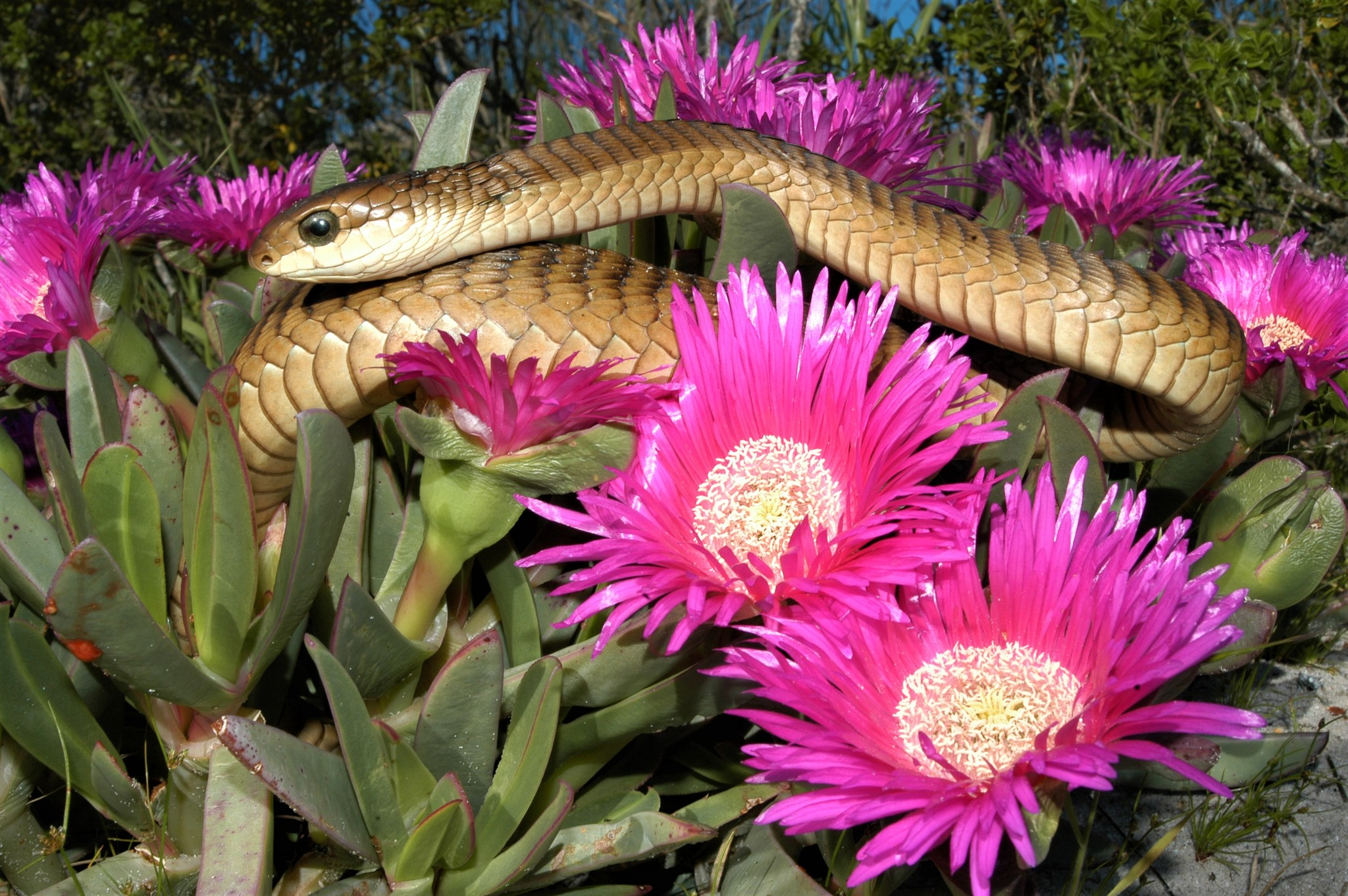
- Male (top) and female (bottom), both at Western Cape, South Africa

Conservation status
- Least Concern (IUCN 3.1)

Scientific classification
- Kingdom: Animalia
- Phylum: Chordata
- Class: Reptilia
- Order: Squamata
- Suborder: Serpentes
- Family: Colubridae
- Genus: Dispholidus
- Species: D. typus

Binomial name
- Dispholidus typus (A. Smith, 1828)
- Boomslang distribution Extant (resident)

Synonyms
- Bucephalus typus A. Smith, 1828; Dispholidus typus Boulenger, 1896; Bucephalus viridis Smith, 1828

= Boomslang =

Boomslang Temporal range: Pliocene–Present

Species of snake

The boomslang (/ˈboʊmslɑːŋ/ or /ˈbɔːmsləŋ/; Dispholidus typus) is a highly venomous snake in the family Colubridae. The species is native to Sub-Saharan Africa.

== Etymology ==
Its common name means "tree snake" in Dutch and Afrikaans – boom meaning "tree", and slang meaning "snake". In Afrikaans, the name is pronounced [ˈbuəmslaŋ].

== Taxonomy ==
The boomslang is a colubrid snake within the subfamily Colubrinae. It belongs to the genus Dispholidus, which contains two other species, D. pembae and D. punctatus.

The boomslang is thought to be closely related to members of the genera Thelotornis, Thrasops, Rhamnophis, and Xyelodontophis, with which it forms the taxonomic tribe Dispholidini.

Close relationships can be shown in the cladogram below:

- Oligodon
- - - - Thrasops flavigularis
      - Thrasops jacksonii
    - - Thrasops capensis
      - - Dispholidus typus (boomslang)
        - Thelotornis kirtlandii
  - - Hapsidophrys
    - Philothamnus

=== Subspecies ===
Two subspecies are recognised, including the nominotypical subspecies.

- D. t. kivuensis Laurent, 1955
- D. t. typus (A. Smith, 1828)

The trinomial authority in parentheses for D. t. typus indicates that the subspecies was originally described in a genus other than Dispholidus.

== Geographic range ==
The boomslang is endemic to Sub-Saharan Africa, from The Gambia, Guinea, Senegal and most of Western Africa (including Benin, Cameroon, Ghana, Nigeria, Togo) through Central and Eastern Africa (Democratic Republic of the Congo, western Ethiopia, Kenya, South Sudan, Tanzania, Uganda). It is found across much of Southern Africa, in a wide array of habitats, with some of the species' densest populations being in Angola, Botswana, Eswatini, Malawi, Mozambique, Namibia, South Africa, Zambia and Zimbabwe.

== Description ==
Adult male, at Western Cape, South Africa

Juvenile, at Limpopo, South Africa

Male at Kruger Park, South Africa

Female at Eastern Cape, South Africa

The average adult boomslang is 100–160 centimetres (3.3–5.2 ft) in total length (including tail). Some exceed 183 centimetres (6.00 ft). The eyes are exceptionally large, and the head has a characteristic egg-like shape. Colouration is highly variable. Males are light green with black or blue scale edges, but adult females may be brown demonstrating sexual dimorphism.

Weight varies from 175 to 510 g (0.386 to 1.124 lb), with an average weight of 299.4 g (0.660 lb).

In this species, the head is distinct from the neck and the canthus rostralis is distinct. The pupil of the very large eye is round. The boomslang has excellent eyesight and often moves its head from side to side to get a better view of objects directly in front. The maxillary teeth are small anteriorly, seven or eight in number, followed by three very large, grooved fangs situated below each eye. The mandibular teeth are subequal. The body is slightly compressed. The dorsal scales, which are arranged in 19 or 21 rows, are very narrow, oblique, strongly keeled, with apical pits. The tail is long, and the subcaudal scales are paired. Ventral scales are 164–201; the anal plate is divided; and the subcaudals are 91–131.

== Habitat ==
The boomslang is an excellent climber and is highly arboreal, living mainly in forested areas. D. typus lives in karoo shrubs, savannahs, lowland forests, and in grasslands. The boomslang is not restricted to trees and can often be found on the ground hunting, feeding, or taking shelter. It will occasionally hide underground when the weather is harsh.

== Reproduction ==
Juvenile, in Tanzania

The boomslang is oviparous, and an adult female can produce on average, 8 to 14 leathery eggs and up to 27 have been observed, which are deposited in a hollow tree trunk or rotting log. The eggs have a relatively long (3 months on average) incubation period. Male hatchlings are grey with blue speckles, and female hatchlings are pale brown. They attain their adult colouration after several years. Hatchlings are about 29 cm (11 in) to 38 cm (15 in) in length and pose no threat to humans, but are dangerously venomous by the time they reach a length around 45 cm (18 in) and a girth as thick as an adult's smallest finger.

== Behaviour and diet ==
D. typus is diurnal and almost exclusively arboreal. It is reclusive, and moves from branch to branch when pursued by anything too large to eat. Its diet includes chameleons and other arboreal lizards, frogs, and occasionally small mammals, birds, and eggs from nesting birds and reptiles, all of which it swallows whole. The boomslang will also feed on other snakes, including cannibalising members of its own species. During cool weather, the boomslang brumates for short periods, often curling up inside the enclosed nest of a weaverbird.

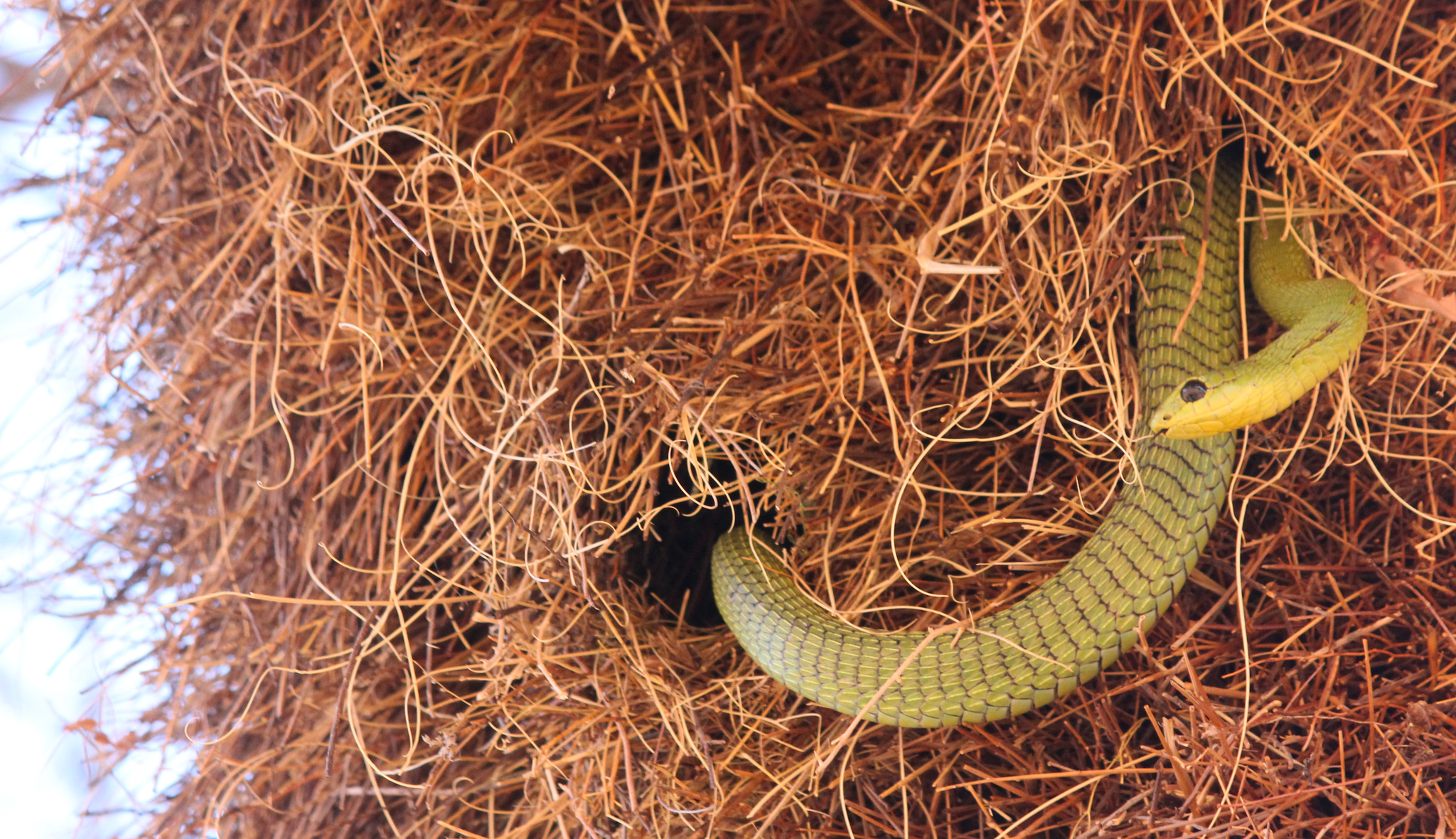
Male raiding the communal nest of sociable weavers, at Northern Cape, South Africa

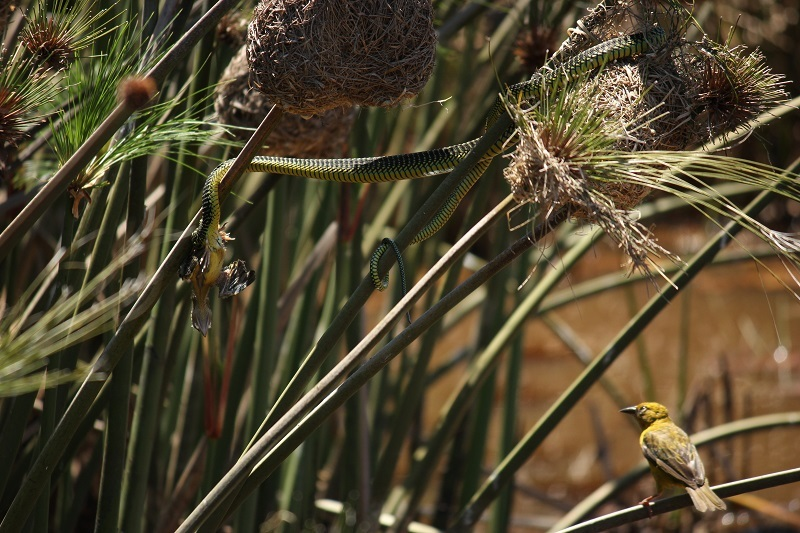
Male feeding on a Cape weaver chick, at Western Cape, South Africa

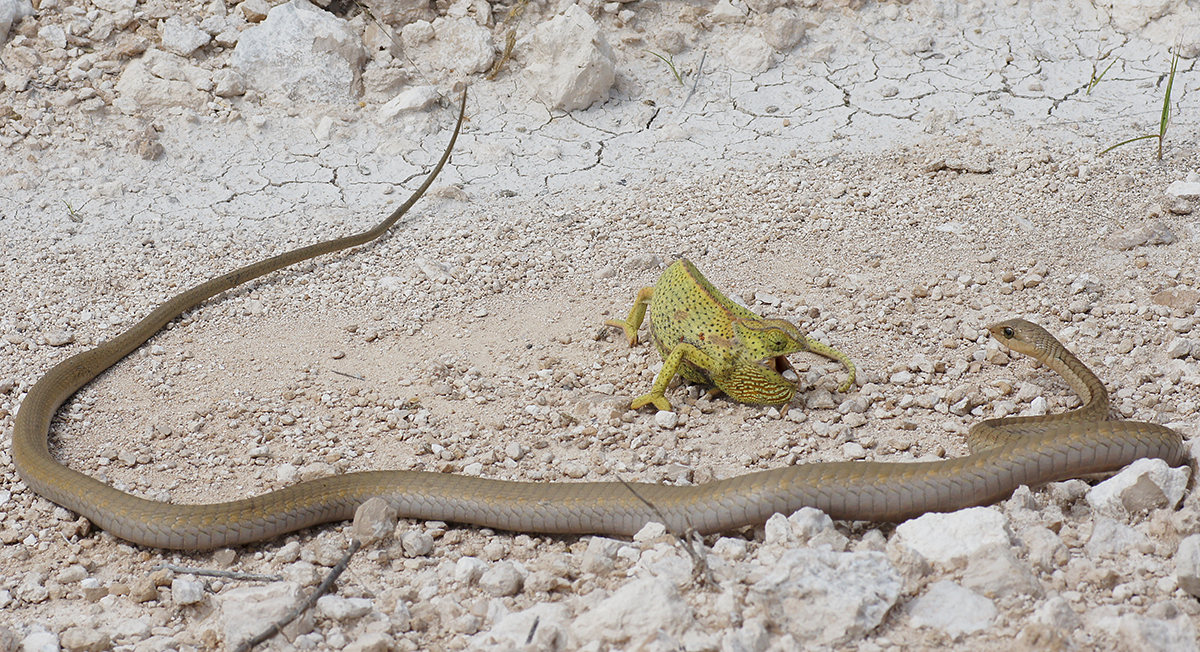
Female hunting a flap-necked chameleon, in Namibia

== Venom ==
The Colubridae are collectively known as "rear-fanged" (or opisthoglyphous) snakes, as their venom-injecting teeth are situated further back in the mouth than elapids or vipers, and thus require the snake to bite, hold on, and "chew" the venom into its victim.

The boomslang possesses a highly potent and toxic venom. It is able to open its jaws up to 170° when biting, facilitating envenomation. The venom of the boomslang is primarily a hemotoxin; it works via a process in which many small clots form in the blood, causing the victim's circulatory system to improperly coagulate, resulting in excessive bleeding and death. The venom has been observed to cause bleeding in tissues such as muscle and the brain (among other organs), while, at the same time, clogging capillaries with tiny blood clots. Other signs and symptoms include headache, nausea, sleepiness, and confusion, leading to cardiac arrest and unconsciousness.

Because boomslang venom is slow-acting, symptoms may not become apparent until many hours after a bite. Although the absence of symptoms provides sufficient time for procuring antivenom, it can also provide victims with false reassurances, leading to underestimation of the seriousness of the bite. Snakes of any species may sometimes fail to inject venom when they bite (a so-called "dry bite" or "bluff strike", enacted in-defense), wherein, after a few hours without any noticeable effects, victims of boomslang bites may falsely believe that their attack was simply a dry or bluff strike. The pathophysiological mechanisms of the venom are different with every snake, resulting in different clinical manifestations with every patient.

An adult boomslang has 1.6 to 8 mg of venom. Its median lethal dose (LD_{50}) in mice is 0.1 mg/kg (intravenously). 0.071 mg/kg (IV) has also been reported. 12.5 mg/kg (subcutaneously) and 1.3–1.8 mg/kg (intraperitoneal). Based on the very low venom quantities produced by D. typus, and the very serious effects found in a good part of the reported cases in humans, it has been suggested that the venom's LD_{50} is lower in humans than in mice, with only 2 to 3 mg being enough to potentially kill a healthy adult.

In 1957, herpetologist Karl Schmidt died after having been bitten by a juvenile boomslang, which he had doubted could produce a fatal dose. He made notes on the symptoms he experienced almost to the end. D. S. Chapman reported eight serious envenomations by boomslangs between 1919 and 1962, two of which were lethal. Up unto this point, many herpetologists believed that rear-fanged colubroid snakes were incapable of producing a lethal bite.

Boomslang monovalent antivenom was developed during the 1940s. The South African Vaccine Producers manufactures a monovalent antivenom for use in boomslang envenomations. Treatment of bites may also require complete blood transfusions, especially if over 24-48 hours have passed without antivenom.

The boomslang is a timid snake, and bites generally occur only when people attempt to handle, catch, pursue or kill the animal. When confronted and cornered, it inflates its neck and assumes an S-shaped striking pose, a key indicator of any snake species feeling threatened.

== Gallery ==
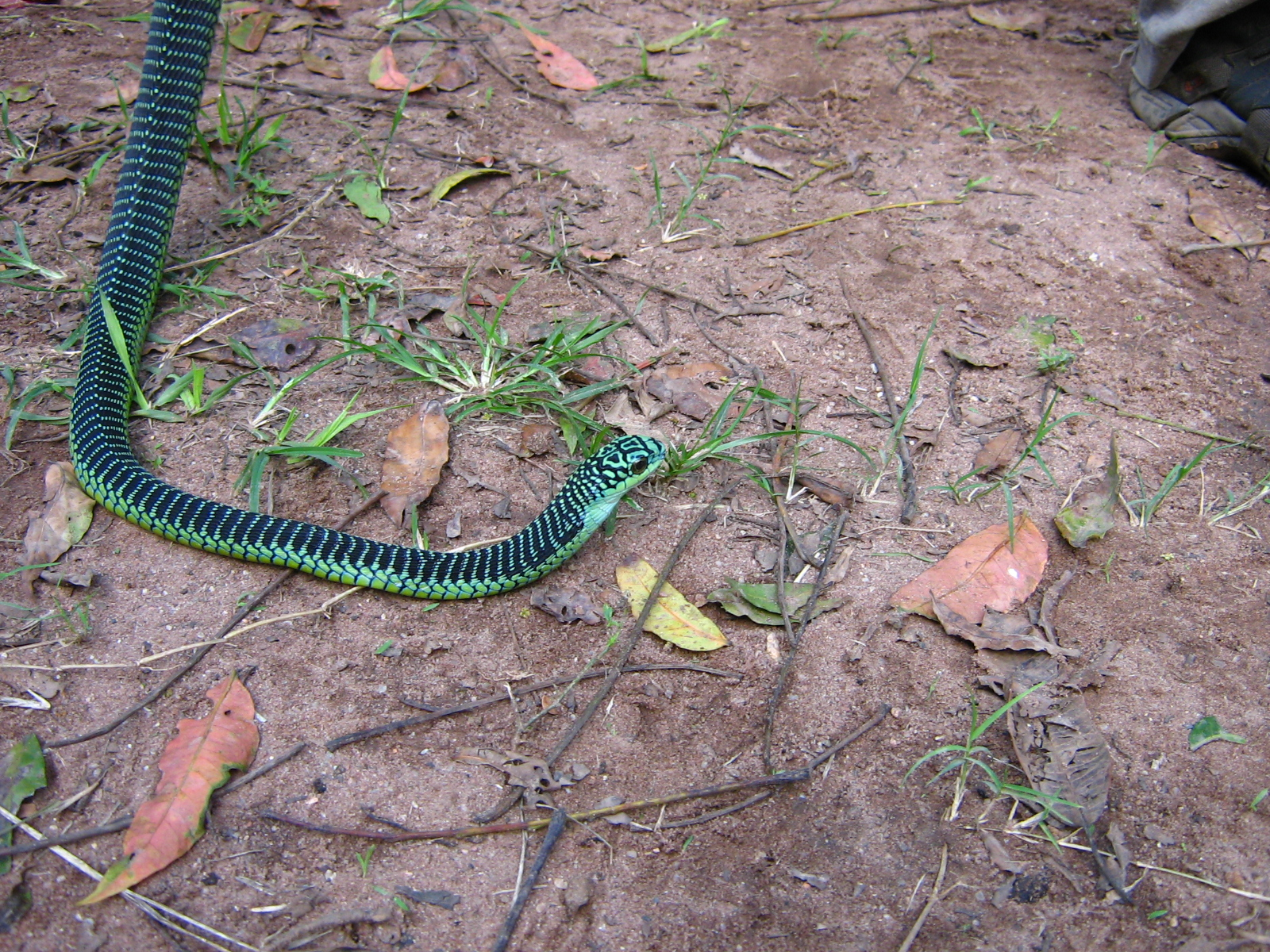
A male boomslang

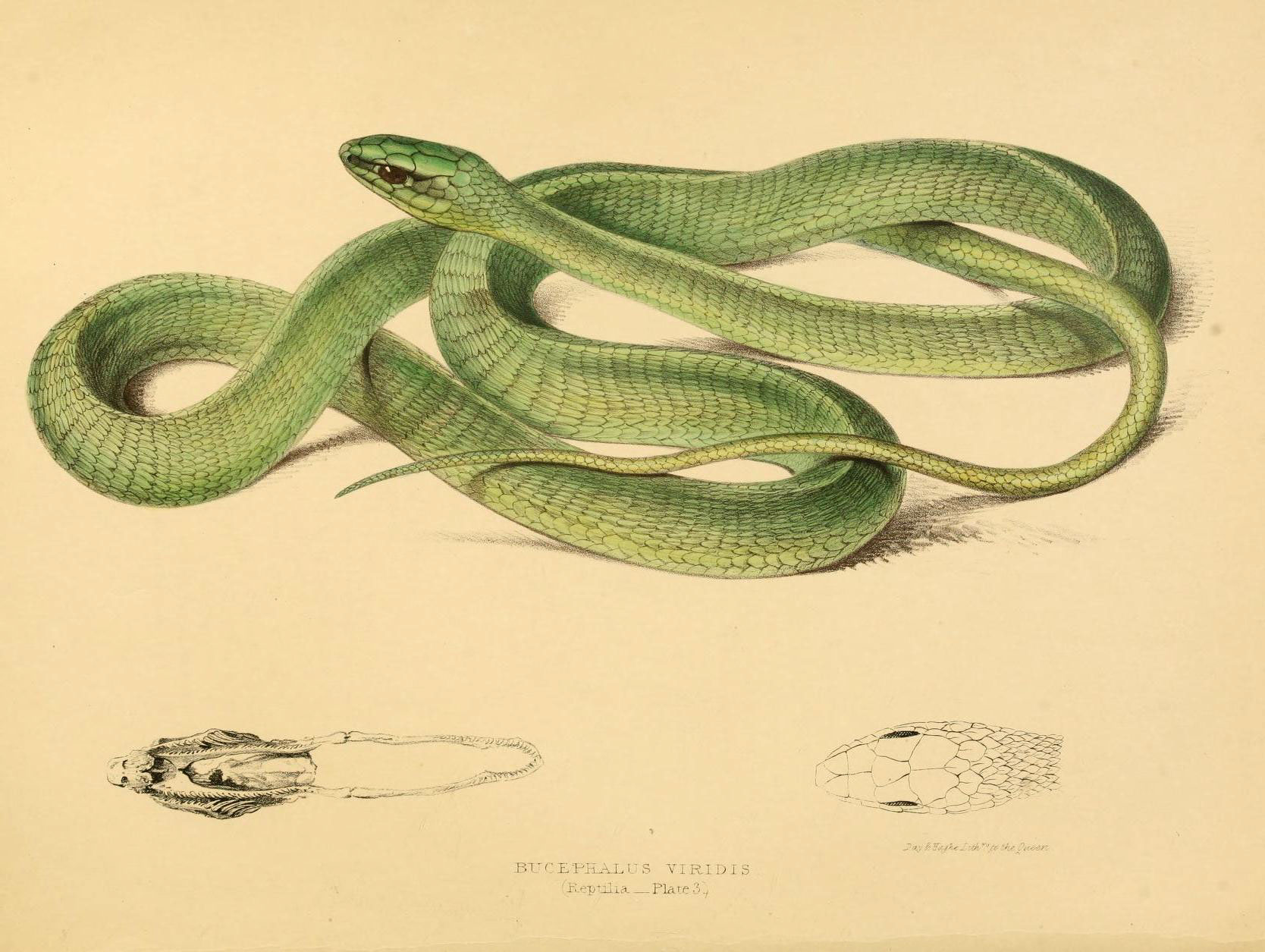
Illustration of D. typus (named as Bucephalus viridis).

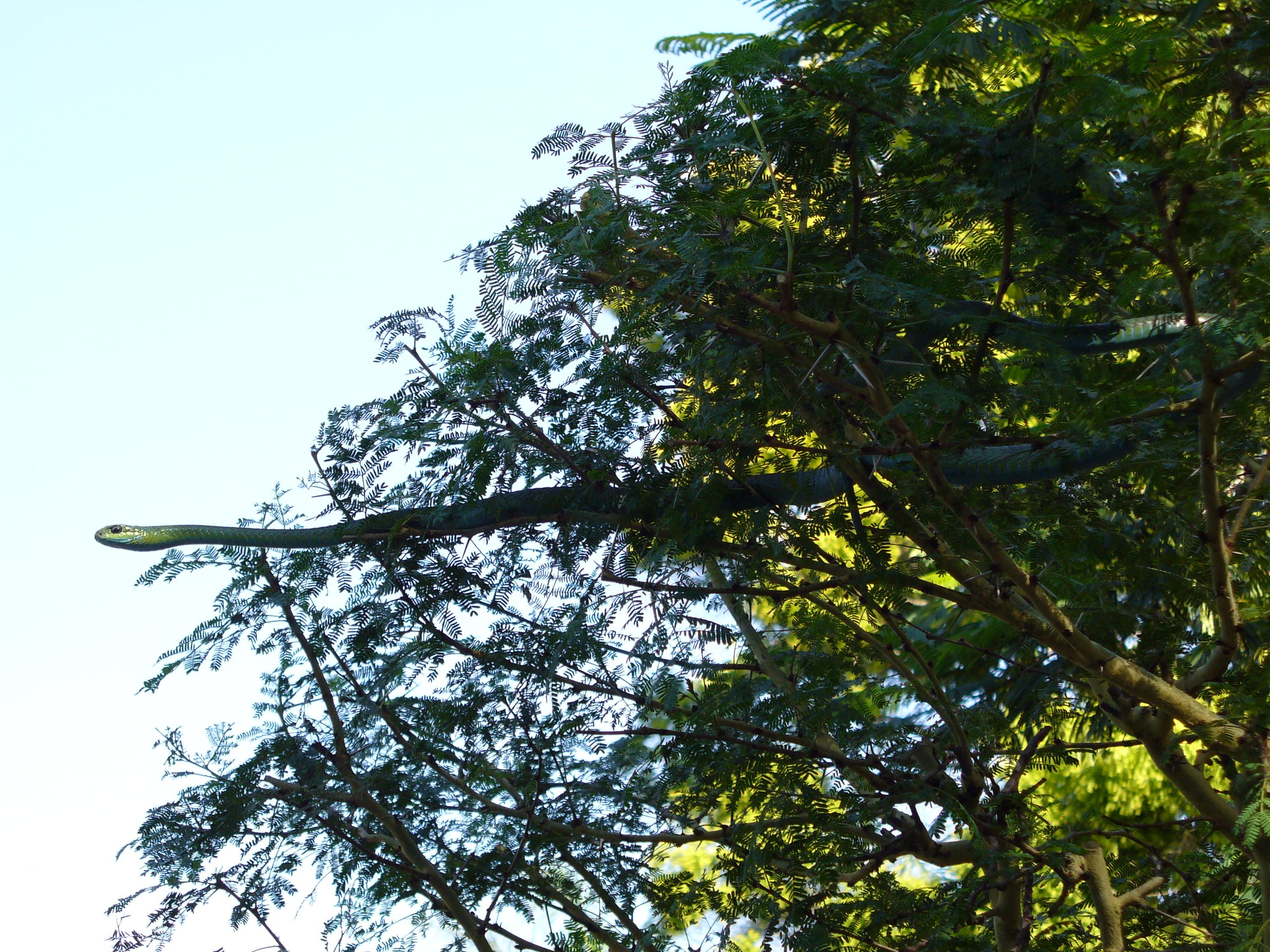
Male, in South Africa

Male

Male, in Tanzania

Male and female, in captivity in Tanzania

Female, in captivity
