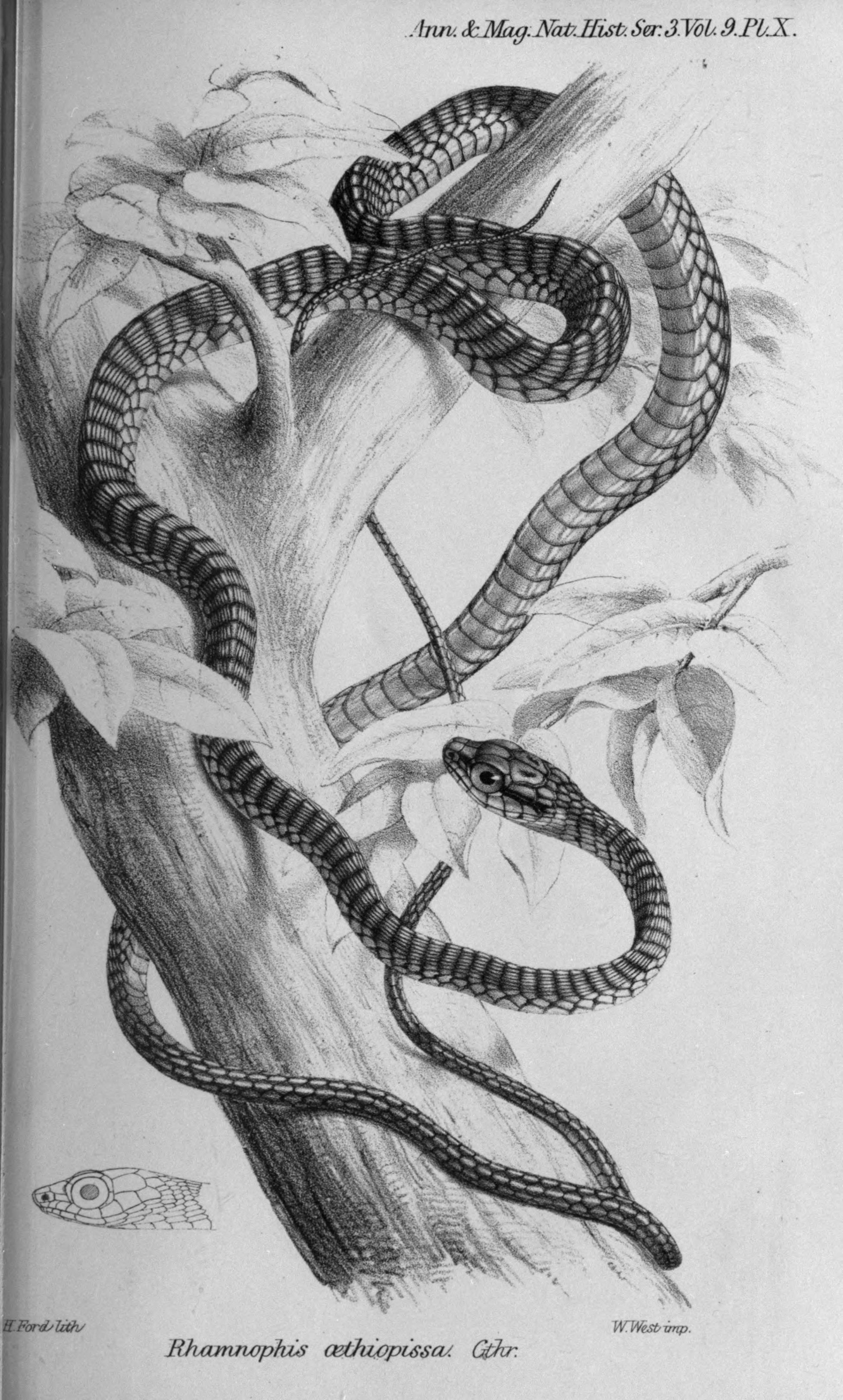
- Rhamnophis aethiopissa, illustration by G.H. Ford (1862) for Günthers original description.

Scientific classification
- Kingdom: Animalia
- Phylum: Chordata
- Class: Reptilia
- Order: Squamata
- Suborder: Serpentes
- Family: Colubridae
- Subfamily: Colubrinae
- Genus: Rhamnophis; Günther, 1862

= Rhamnophis =

Genus of snakes

Rhamnophis is a genus of arboreal venomous snakes, commonly known as dagger-tooth tree snakes or large-eyed tree snakes, in the family Colubridae. The genus is endemic to equatorial sub-Saharan Africa. There are two recognized species.

== Taxonomy ==
The status of the genus Rhamnophis has long been subject to debate, and has been treated as a synonym of Thrasops by some authors. Both genera belong to the tribe Dispholidini, and are closely related to the genera Dispholidus, Thelotornis, and Xyelodontophis.

== Species ==
The following two species are recognized as being valid.

- Rhamnophis aethiopissa Günther, 1862 – large-eyed green tree snake, splendid dagger-tooth tree snake
- Rhamnophis batesii (Boulenger, 1908) – spotted dagger-tooth tree snake

Nota bene: A binomial authority in parentheses indicates that the species was originally described in a genus other than Rhamnophis.

== Venom ==
Rhamnophis are rear-fanged colubrids; that is to say, they have venom, which they may be able to inoculate by biting. Due to very little being known about them and their venom, it is necessary to be very cautious when working with these snakes. These species have an almost identical defense mechanism as the boomslang (Dispholidus typus) and twig snakes (genusThelotornis) in that they will inflate their throat to make themselves look bigger. It is thought that these species are evolutionary in between the boomslang and the species of the genus Thrasops in terms of their fangs and means of envenomation.
