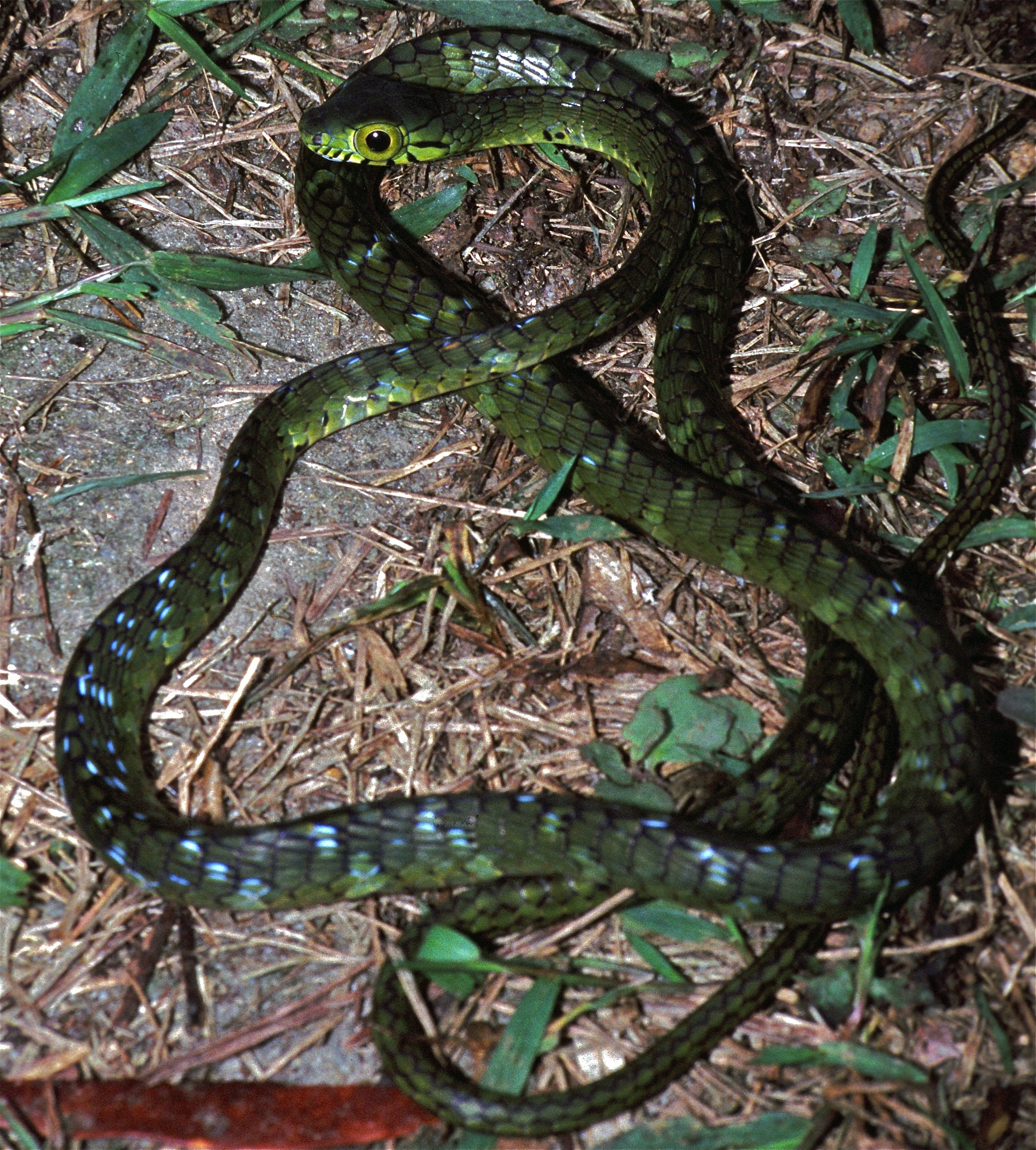

Conservation status
- Least Concern (IUCN 3.1)

Scientific classification
- Kingdom: Animalia
- Phylum: Chordata
- Class: Reptilia
- Order: Squamata
- Suborder: Serpentes
- Family: Colubridae
- Genus: Rhamnophis
- Species: R. aethiopissa

Binomial name
- Rhamnophis aethiopissa Günther, 1862

Synonyms
- Rhamnophis æthiopissa Günther, 1862; Crypsidomus aethiops Boettger, 1888; Rhamnophis æthiops — Boulenger, 1896; Thrasops splendens Andersson, 1901; Rhamnophis aethiopissa — Loveridge, 1929; Thrasops aethiopissa — J. Trape & Roux-Estève, 1995; Rhamnophis aethiopissa — Rödel & Mahsberg, 2000

= Large-eyed green tree snake =

Species of snake

The large-eyed green tree snake (Rhamnophis aethiopissa), also known commonly as the splendid dagger-tooth tree snake, is a species of venomous snake in the subfamily Colubrinae of the family Colubridae. The species is endemic to Africa. There are three recognized subspecies.

== Geographic range ==
R. aethiopissa is found in Angola, Cameroon, Central African Republic, Republic of the Congo, Democratic Republic of the Congo, Equatorial Guinea, Gabon, Ghana, Guinea, Ivory Coast, Kenya, Liberia, Senegal, Sierra Leone, South Sudan, Tanzania, Togo, Uganda, and Zambia.

== Habitat ==
The preferred natural habitats of R. aethiopissa are forest and savanna, at altitudes from sea level to 1,040 m (3,410 ft).

== Description ==
R. aethiopissa may attain a total length (including tail) of 1.5 m (4.9 ft). The dorsal scales, which are smooth, are arranged in 17 rows at midbody.

== Behavior ==
R. aethiopissa is arboreal and diurnal.

== Diet ==
R. aethiopissa preys upon frogs, lizards, birds, and small mammals.

== Reproduction ==
R. aethiopissa is oviparous. Eggs are laid in leaf litter, and clutch size may be as many as 17 eggs.

== Subspecies ==
The following three subspecies are recognized as being valid, including the nominotypical subspecies.

- Rhamnophis aethiopissa aethiopissa Günther, 1862
- Rhamnophis aethiopissa ituriensis Schmidt, 1923
- Rhamnophis aethiopissa elgonensis Loveridge, 1929

== Venom ==
Rhamnophis aethiopissa is a rear-fanged colubrid, i.e., it has venom, which it may be able to inoculate by biting. Because very little is known about this species and its venom, it is necessary to be very cautious when working with it. This species has an almost identical defence mechanism to the boomslang (Dispholidus typus) and twig snakes (genus Thelotornis) as it also inflates its throat to make itself look bigger. It is believed that the species of the genus Rhamnophis evolved between the boomslang and the species of the genus Thrasops in terms of their fangs and means of envenomation.
