= Black tree snake =

There are two species of snake named black tree snake:

- Thrasops jacksonii
- Thrasops occidentalis
