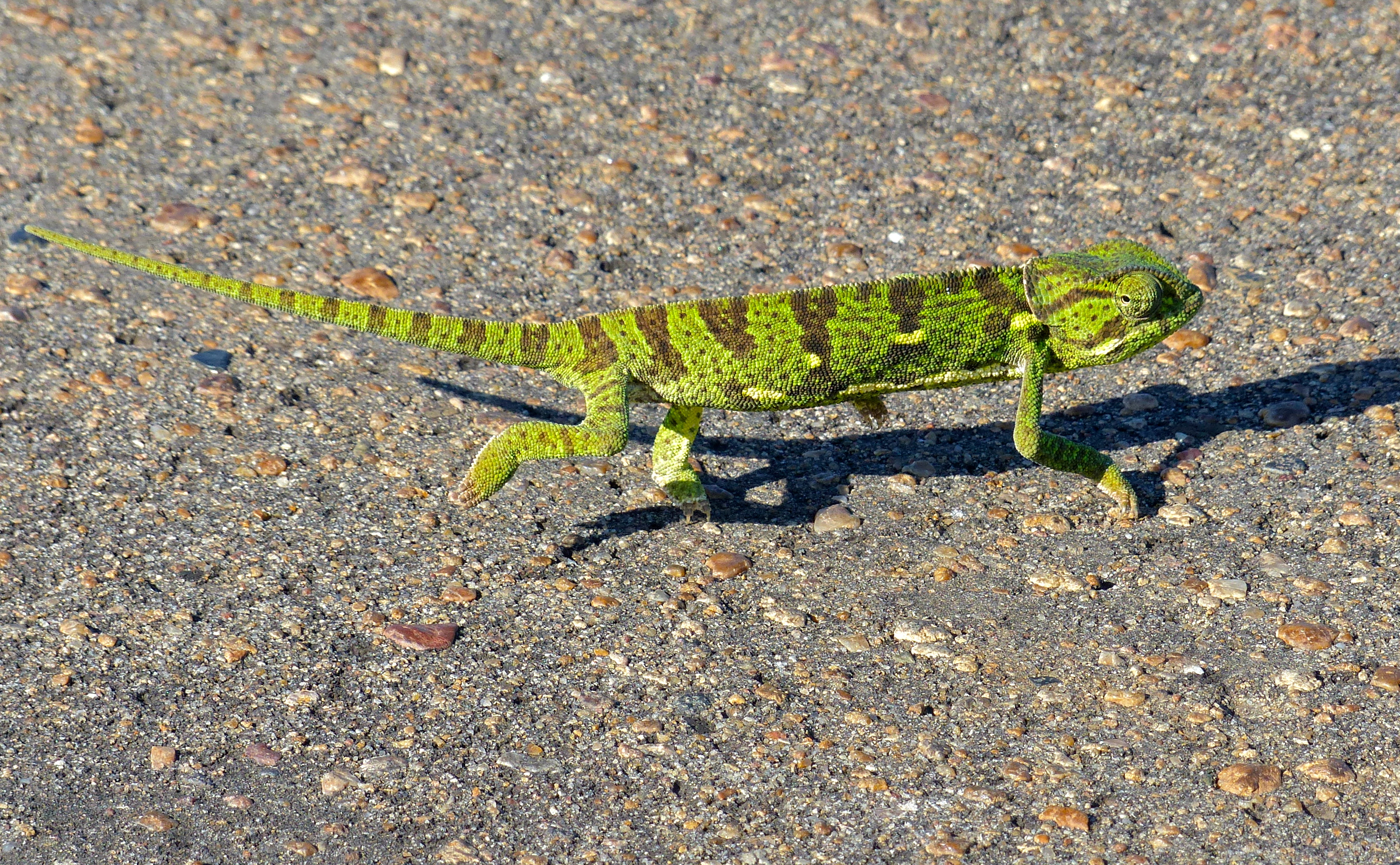

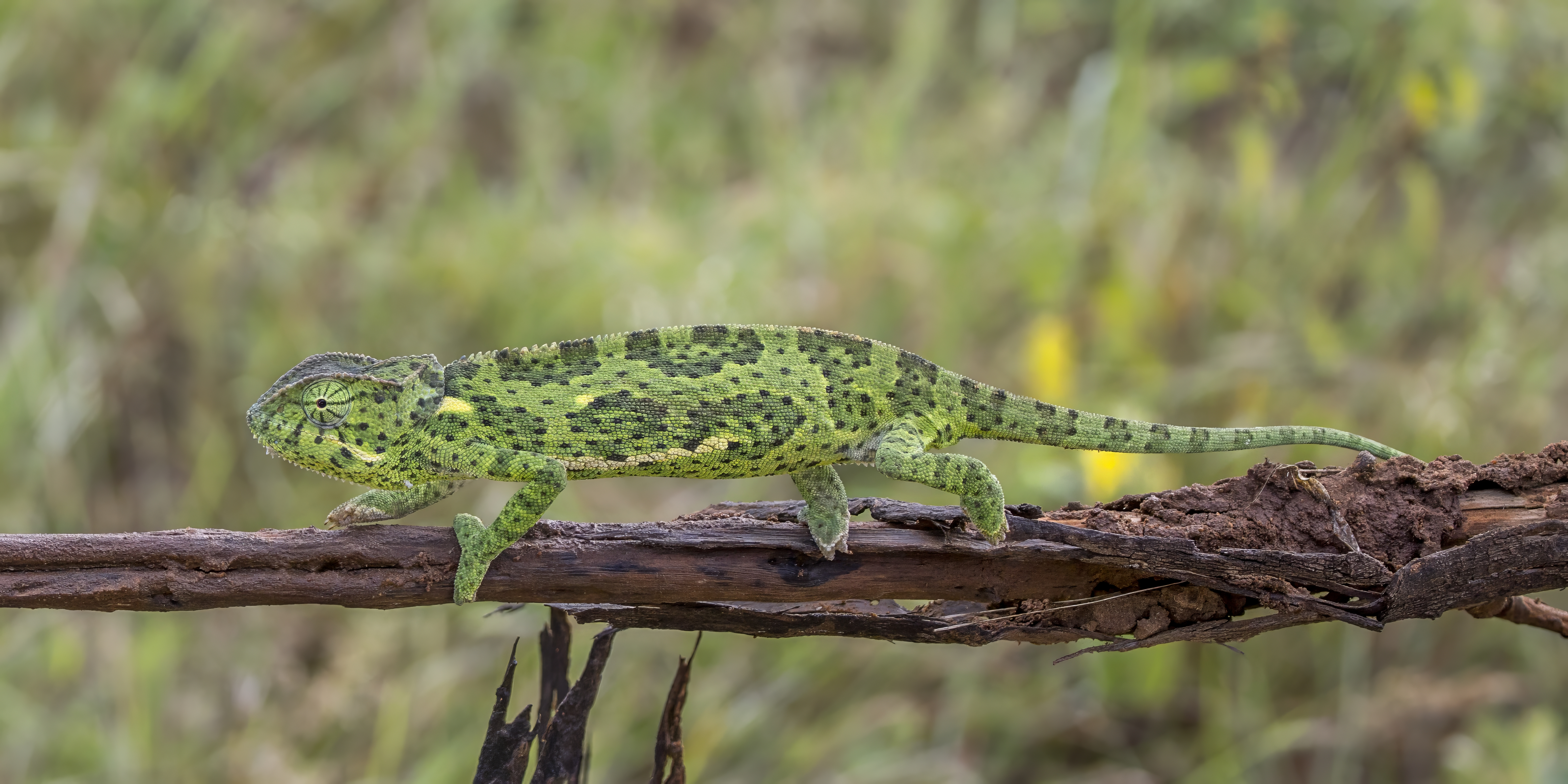
- both in Kruger National Park, South Africa

Conservation status
- Least Concern (IUCN 3.1)

Scientific classification
- Kingdom: Animalia
- Phylum: Chordata
- Class: Reptilia
- Order: Squamata
- Suborder: Iguania
- Family: Chamaeleonidae
- Genus: Chamaeleo
- Species: C. dilepis

Binomial name
- Chamaeleo dilepis Leach, 1819
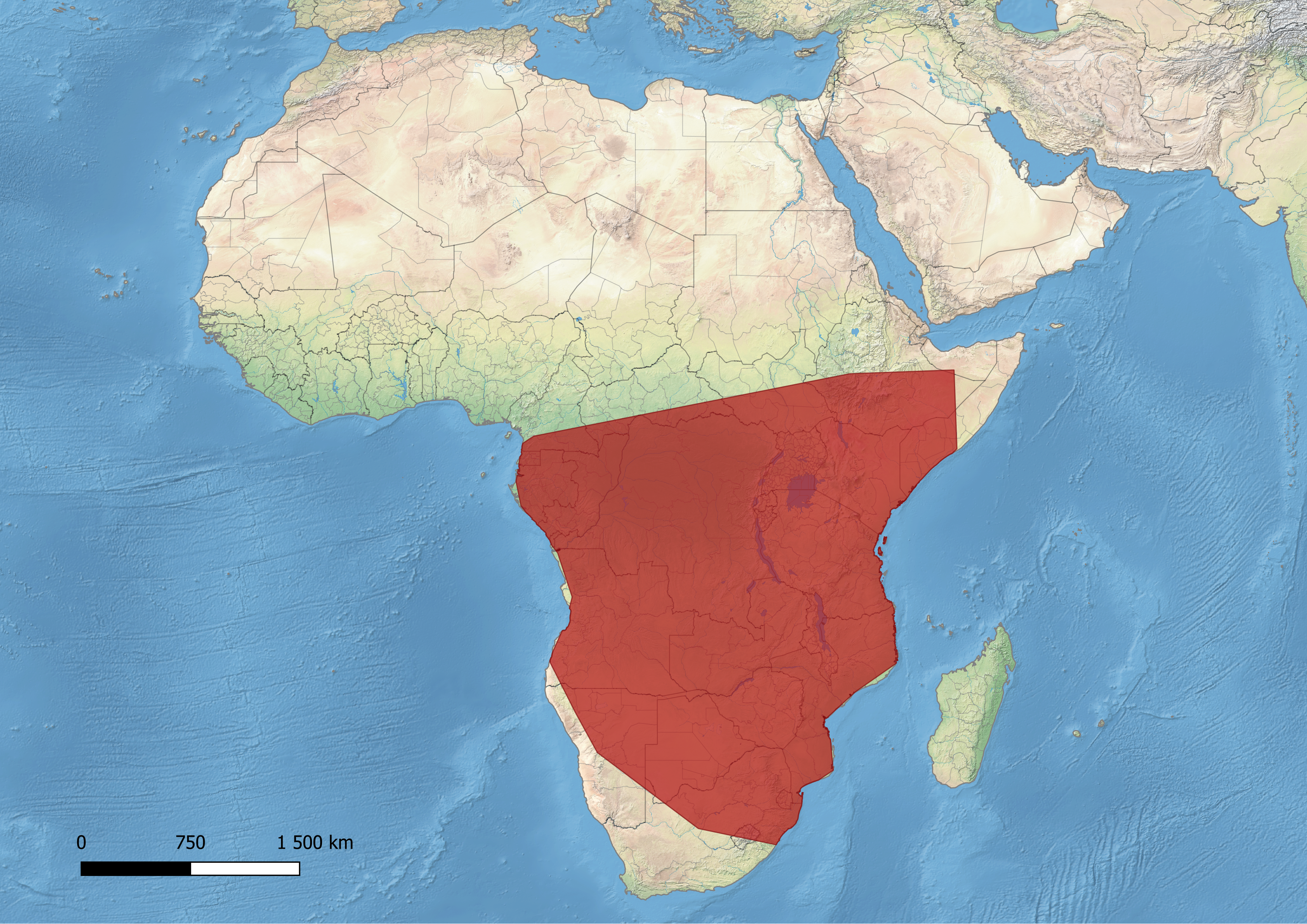

Synonyms
- (arranged in alphabetical order): Chamaeleo angusticoronatus Barbour, 1903; Chamaeleo bilobus Kuhl, 1820; Chamaeleo capellii Bocage, 1866; Chamaeleo planiceps Merrem, 1820

= Flap-necked chameleon =

Species of lizard

The flap-necked chameleon (Chamaeleo dilepis) is a species of arboreal chameleon, a lizard in the family Chamaeleonidae. The species is native to sub-Saharan Africa. There are eight recognized subspecies, including the nominotypical subspecies.

== Subspecies ==
The following subspecies of the flap-necked chameleon are recognized as being valid.

- Chamaeleo dilepis dilepis Leach, 1819 – flap-necked chameleon
- Chamaeleo dilepis idjwiensis Loveridge, 1942 – Idjwi Island flap-necked chameleon
- Chamaeleo dilepis isabellinus Günther, 1893 – Isabelline flap-necked chameleon
- Chamaeleo dilepis martensi Mertens, 1864 – Pemba Island flap-necked chameleon
- Chamaeleo dilepis petersii Gray, 1865 – Peters' flap-necked chameleon
- Chamaeleo dilepis quilensis Bocage, 1866
- Chamaeleo dilepis roperi Boulenger, 1890
- Chamaeleo dilepis ruspolii Boettger, 1893

== Etymology ==
The subspecific name roperi is in honor of G.D. Trevor-Roper.

The subspecific name ruspolii is in honor of Italian explorer Prince Eugenio Ruspoli.

== Description ==
Chamaeleo dilepis is a large chameleon, reaching a total length (including tail) of 35 cm (14 in). Colouring ranges through various shades of green, yellow, and brown. There is usually a pale stripe on the lower flanks and one to three pale patches higher on the flanks.

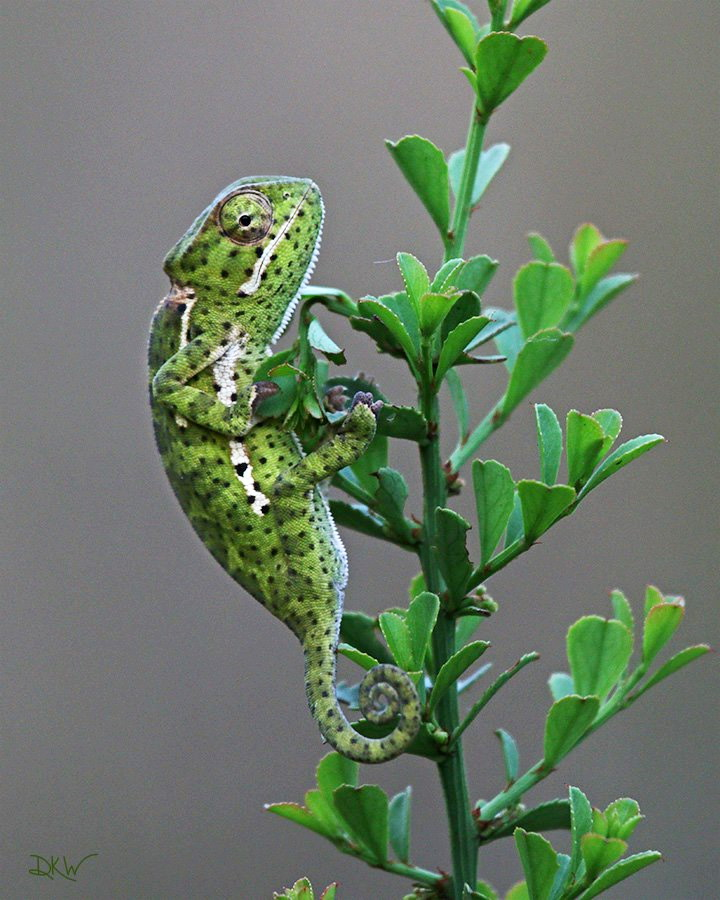

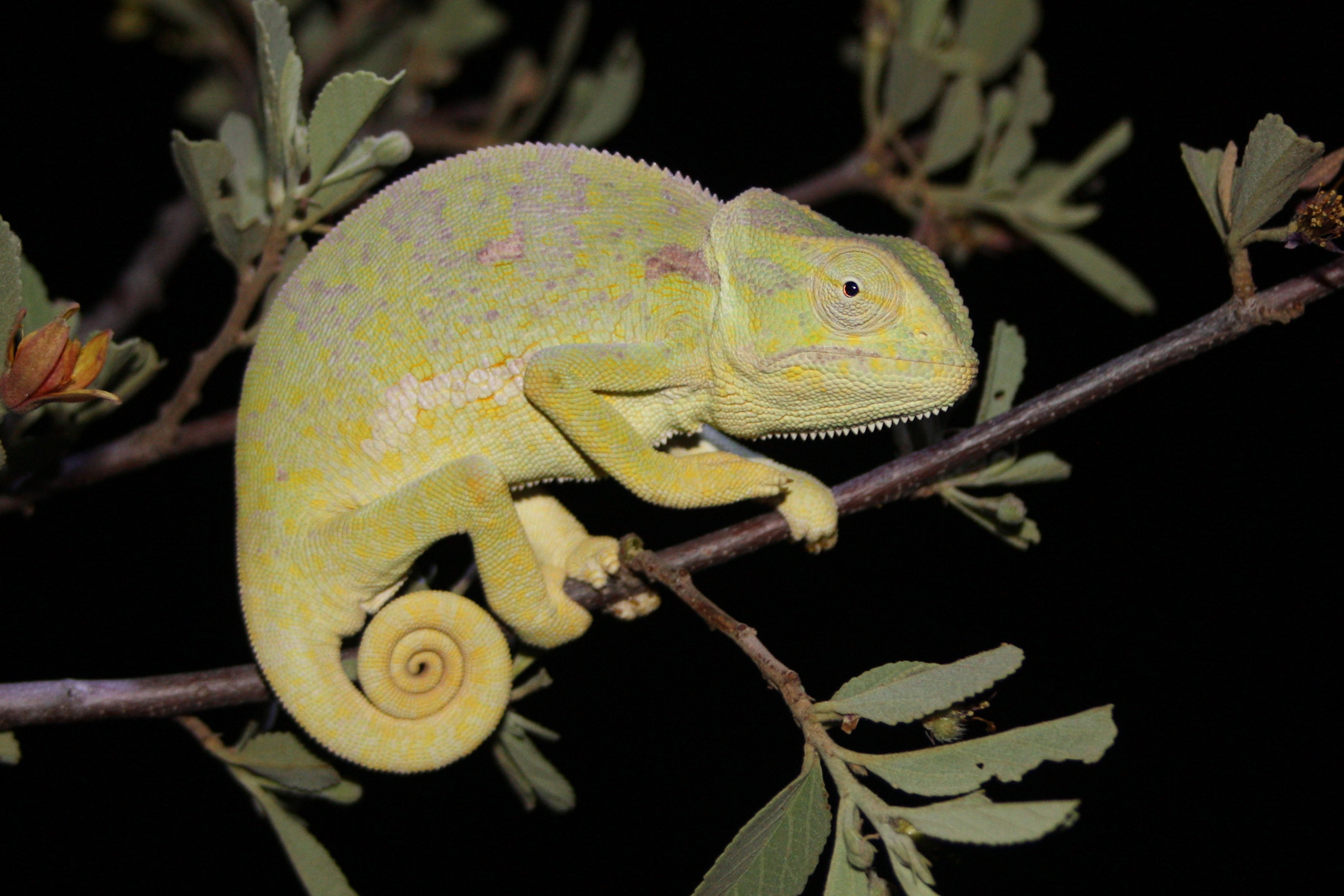

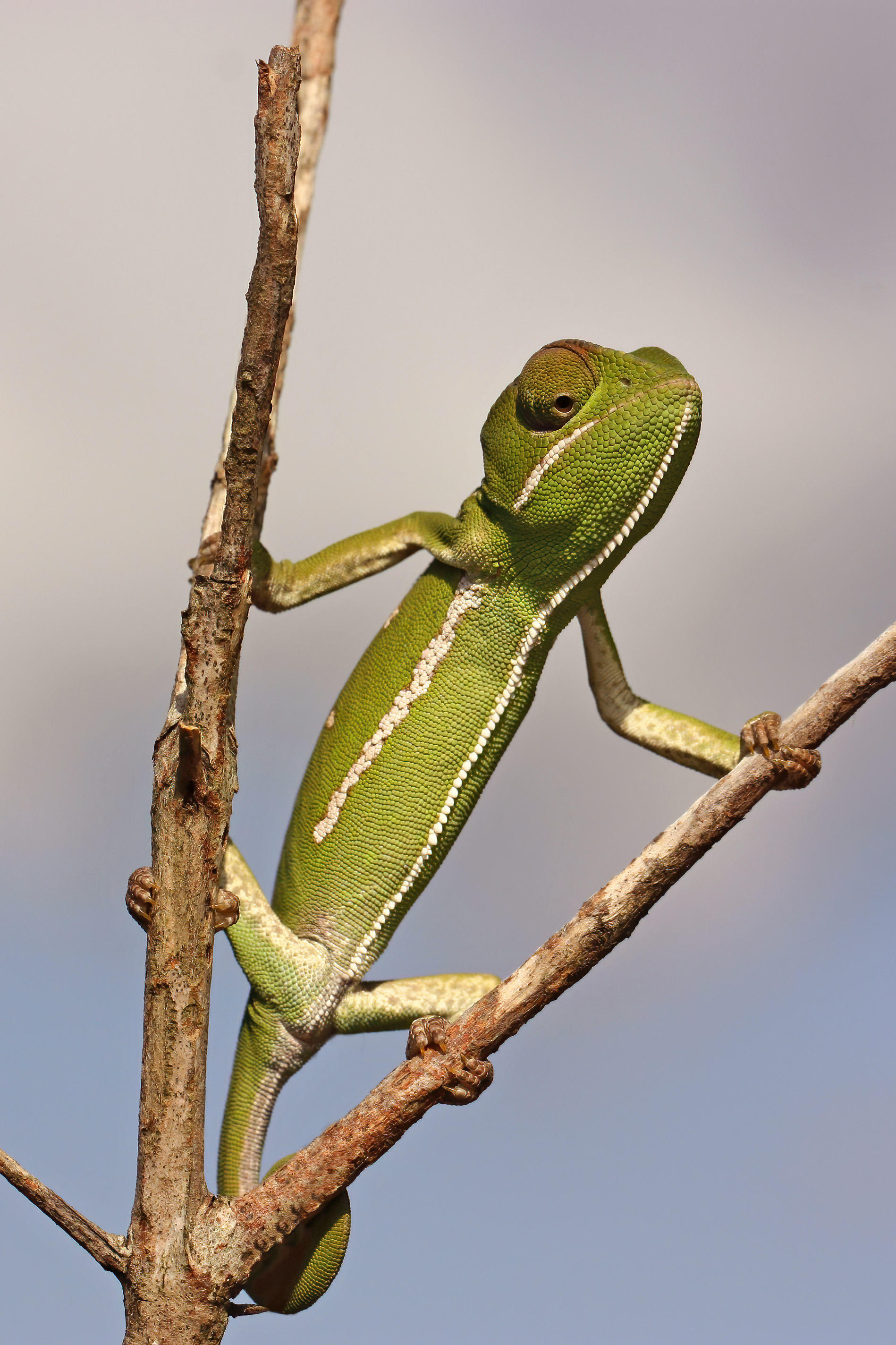
Juvenile female
South Africa

== Geographic range and habitat ==
Chamaeleo dilepis has a very wide distribution, occurring throughout much of sub-Saharan Africa from as far north as Ethiopia and Somalia to a western extreme of Cameroon, and as far south as northern South Africa. It inhabits coastal forest, moist or dry savannah, woodland and bushy grasslands, and may also venture into rural and suburban areas.

== Ecology ==
The adult female flap-necked chameleon lays 10-40 eggs in a hole dug in soil. The eggs take 10–12 months to hatch. The diet of C. dilepis includes a variety of invertebrates, although large individuals may take geckos and other chameleons. The species is itself commonly preyed on by snakes such as the boomslang and the twig snake.

== Conservation ==
The flap-necked chameleon is in heavy demand for the international pet trade, being the third most highly traded chameleon species. More than 111,000 individuals were exported between 1977 and 2011, mostly to the USA. No detrimental effects on the total population size have been observed so far, although more in-depth studies have been recommended. The species is currently classified as Least Concern by the IUCN.
