= Hemidactylus ruspolii =

Conservation status
- Least Concern (IUCN 3.1)

Scientific classification
- Kingdom: Animalia
- Phylum: Chordata
- Class: Reptilia
- Order: Squamata
- Suborder: Gekkota
- Family: Gekkonidae
- Genus: Hemidactylus
- Species: H. ruspolii

Binomial name
- Hemidactylus ruspolii Boulenger, 1896

Synonyms
- Hemidactylus erlangeri Steindachner, 1907

Species of lizard

Hemidactylus ruspolii, also known commonly as the farm leaf-toed gecko, Prince Ruspoli's gecko, Ruspoli's gecko, and the turnip-tailed black and yellow gecko, is a species of lizard in the family Gekkonidae. The species is endemic to northern East Africa.

== Etymology ==
The specific name, ruspolii, is in honor of Italian explorer Prince Eugenio Ruspoli.

== Geographic range ==
H. ruspolii is found in Ethiopia, northern Kenya, and Somalia.

== Reproduction ==
H. ruspolii is oviparous.
