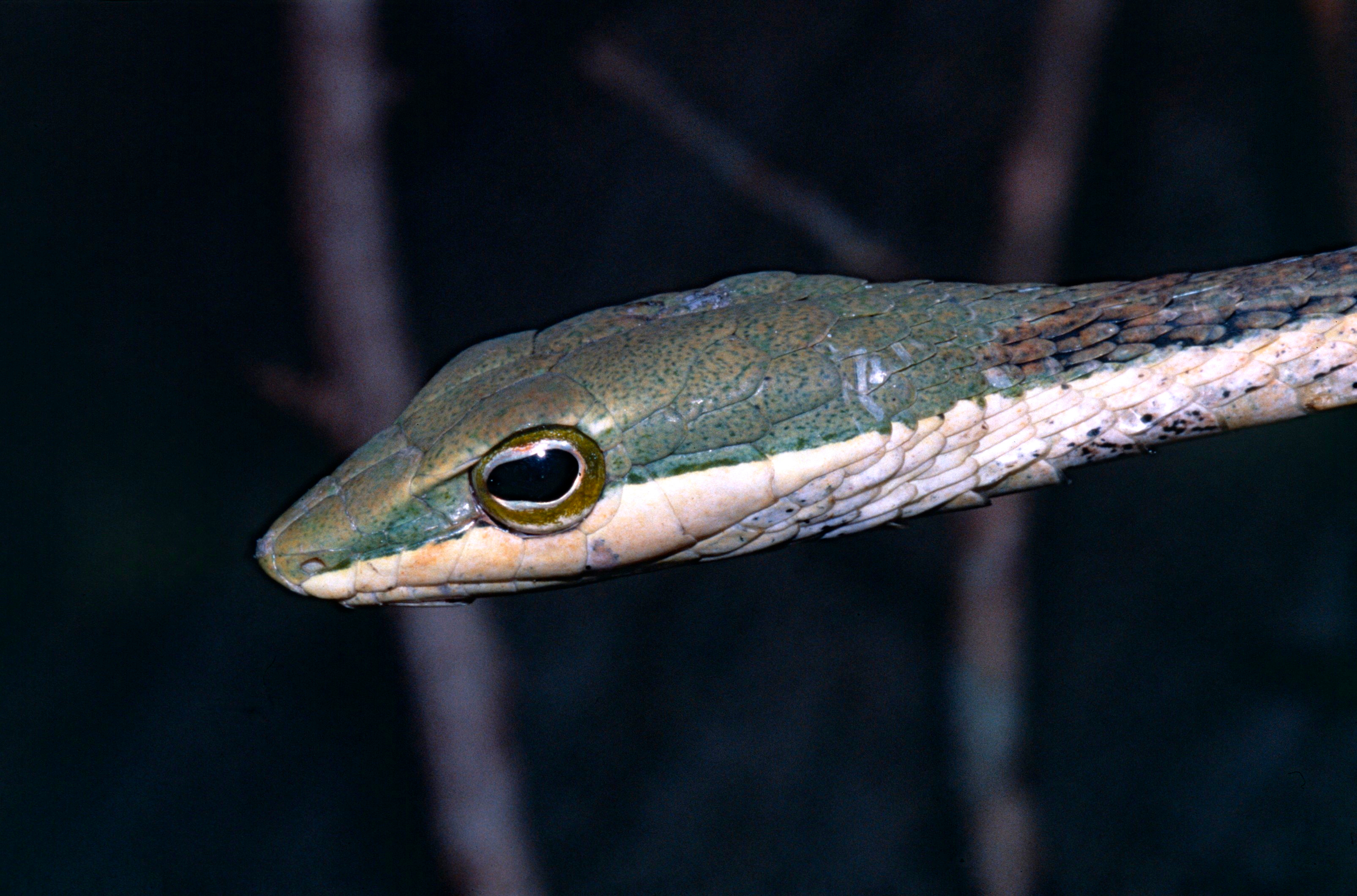

Conservation status
- Least Concern (IUCN 3.1)

Scientific classification
- Kingdom: Animalia
- Phylum: Chordata
- Class: Reptilia
- Order: Squamata
- Suborder: Serpentes
- Family: Colubridae
- Genus: Thelotornis
- Species: T. mossambicanus

Binomial name
- Thelotornis mossambicanus (Bocage, 1895)

Synonyms
- Dryiophis kirtlandii var. mossambicana Bocage, 1895; Thelotornis capensis mossambicanus — Rasmussen, 1981; Thelotornis mossambicanus — Broadley, 2001

= Eastern vine snake =

Species of snake

The eastern vine snake (Thelotornis mossambicanus), also known commonly as the eastern twig snake, is a species of venomous snake in the family Colubridae. The species is endemic to Eastern Africa.

== Geographic range ==
T. mossambicanus is found in southeastern Kenya, Malawi, Mozambique, southern Somalia, Tanzania, Zambia, and eastern Zimbabwe.
