= Thrasops schmidti =

Conservation status
- Endangered (IUCN 3.1)

Scientific classification
- Kingdom: Animalia
- Phylum: Chordata
- Class: Reptilia
- Order: Squamata
- Suborder: Serpentes
- Family: Colubridae
- Genus: Thrasops
- Species: T. schmidti

Binomial name
- Thrasops schmidti Loveridge, 1936

Species of snake

Thrasops schmidti, Schmidt's bold-eyed tree snake , is a species of snake of the family Colubridae.

The snake is found in Kenya.

== Etymology ==
The specific name, schmidti, is in honor of American herpetologist Karl Patterson Schmidt.
