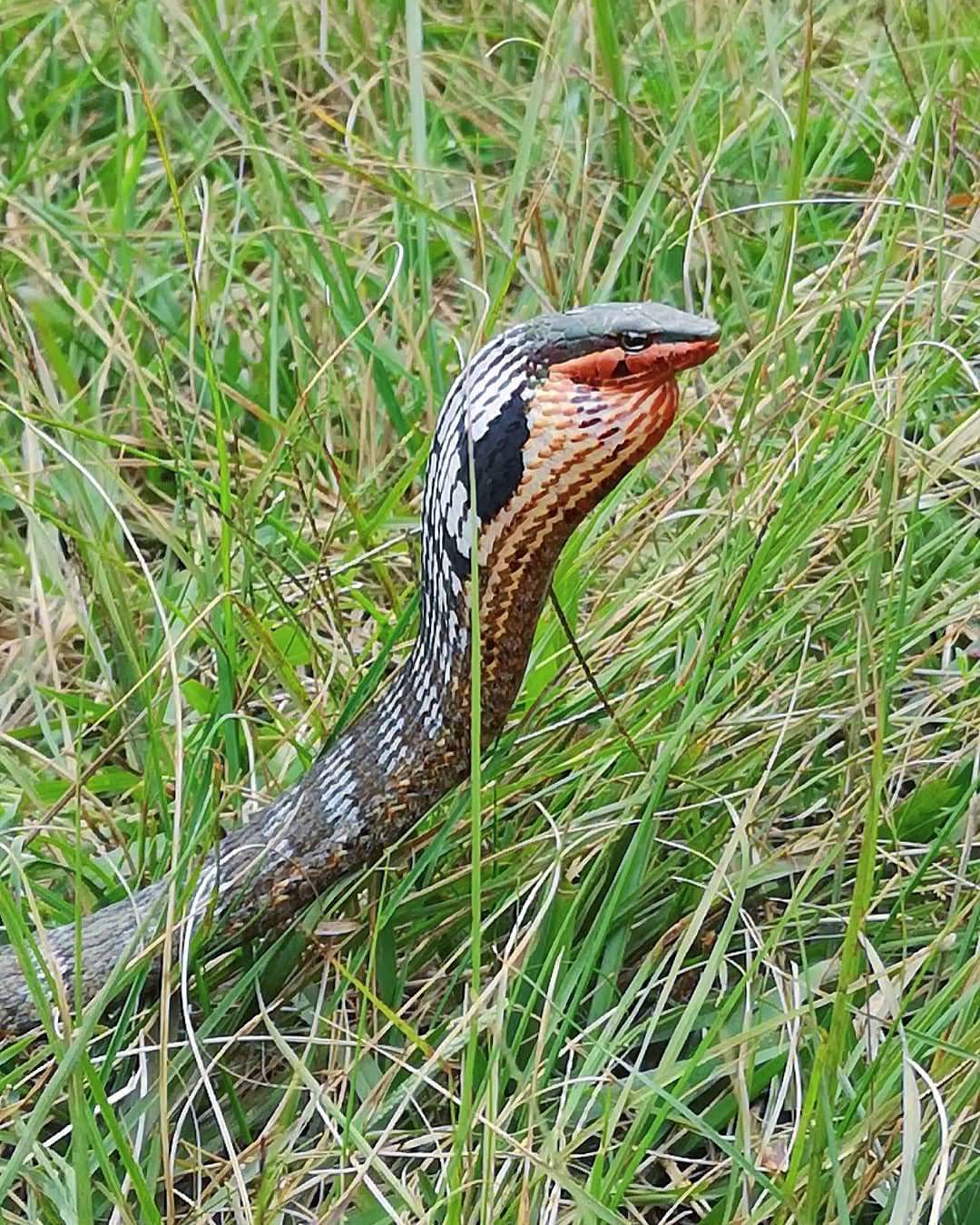

Conservation status
- Vulnerable (IUCN 3.1)

Scientific classification
- Kingdom: Animalia
- Phylum: Chordata
- Class: Reptilia
- Order: Squamata
- Suborder: Serpentes
- Family: Colubridae
- Genus: Thelotornis
- Species: T. usambaricus

Binomial name
- Thelotornis usambaricus Broadley, 2001

= Usambara vine snake =

Species of snake

Thelotornis usambaricus, also known commonly as the Usambara vine snake, is a species of snake in the subfamily Colubrinae of the family Colubridae. The species is native to southeastern Africa.

== Geographic range ==
T. usambaricus is found in Kenya, Mozambique, and Tanzania.
