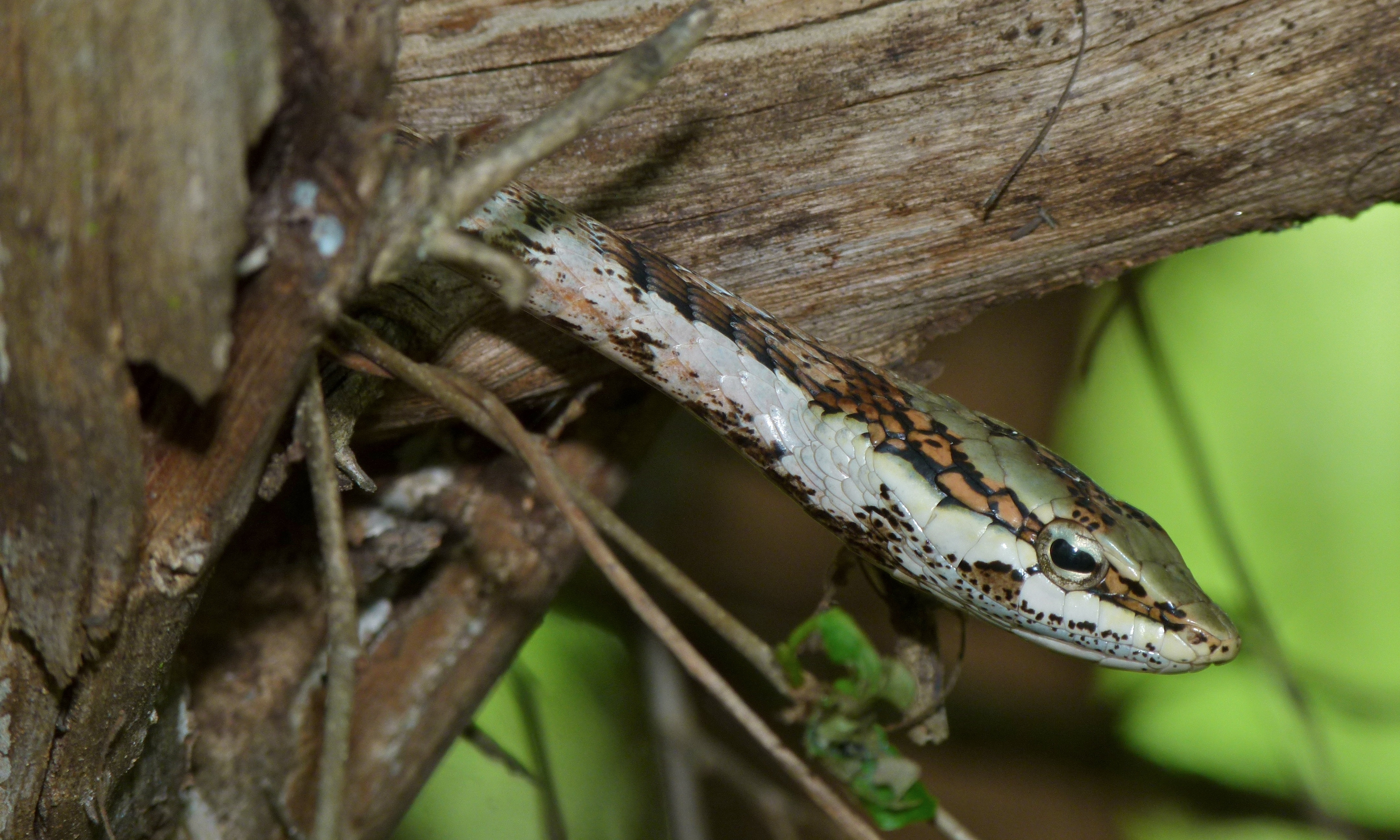
- Thelotornis capensis
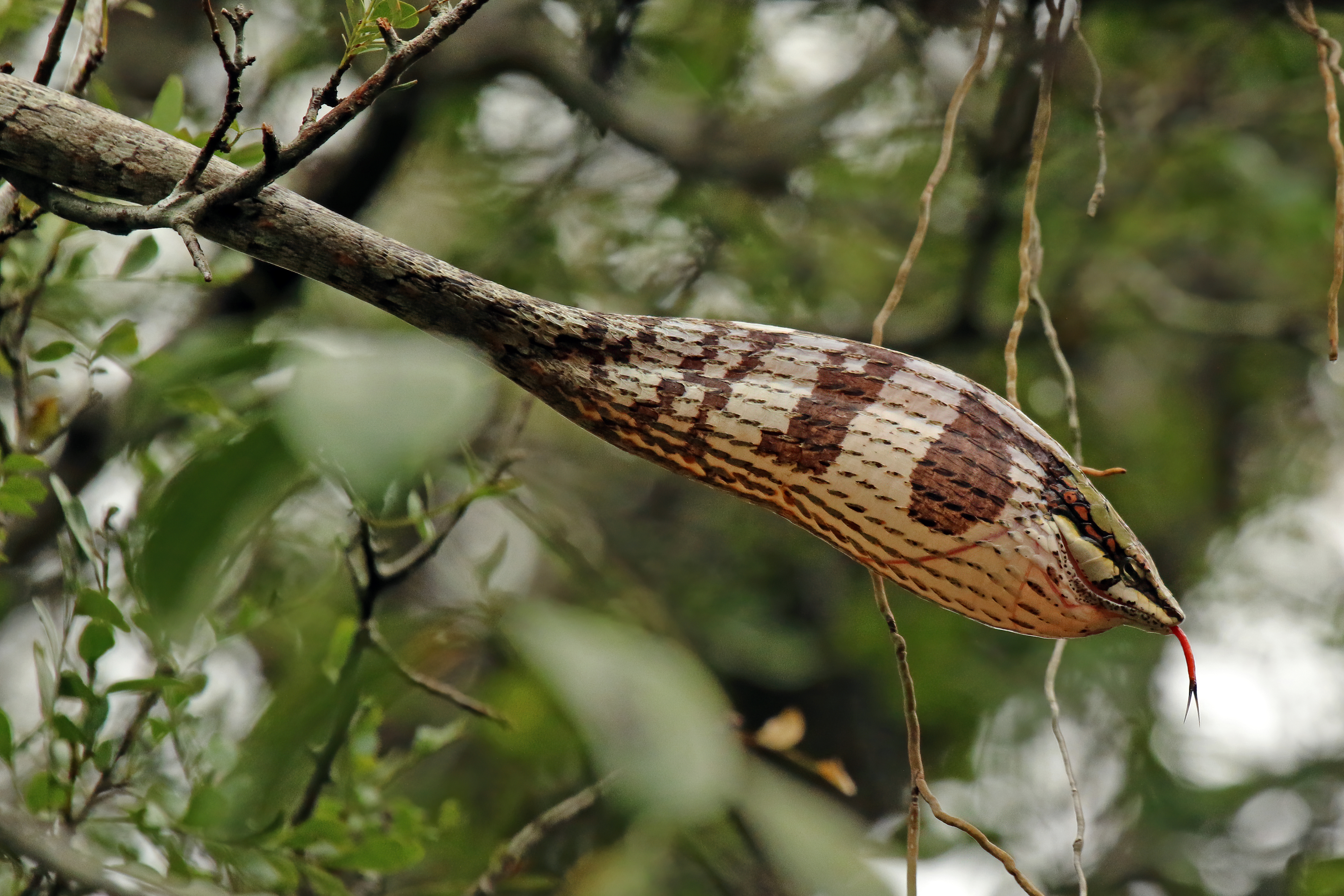
- threat display

Conservation status
- Least Concern (IUCN 3.1)

Scientific classification
- Kingdom: Animalia
- Phylum: Chordata
- Class: Reptilia
- Order: Squamata
- Suborder: Serpentes
- Family: Colubridae
- Genus: Thelotornis
- Species: T. capensis

Binomial name
- Thelotornis capensis A. Smith, 1849

= Savanna vine snake =

Species of snake

The savanna vine snake (Thelotornis capensis), also known commonly, as the southern vine snake, is a species of highly venomous snake in the subfamily Colubrinae of the family Colubridae. There are two recognized subspecies.

== Geographic distribution ==
Thelotornis capensis is found in southern Africa.

== Habitat ==
The preferred natural habitats of Thelotornis capensis are forest, savanna, and shrubland.

== Behavior ==
Thelotornis capensis is diurnal and semi-arboreal.

== Description ==
Thelotornis capensis is slender and has a long tail. The longest museum specimen is a male with a snout-to-vent length (SVL) of 106 cm (42 in), a tail 62 cm (24 in) long, and a combined total length of 168 cm (66 in).

== Venom ==
Thelotornis capensis is venomous. Venom is delivered by large grooved teeth at the rear of the upper jaw. German herpetologist Robert Mertens died as the result of being bitten by this species.

== Reproduction ==
Thelotornis capensis is oviparous. Clutch size is 4–13 eggs. The eggs are elongated and rather small, each measuring on average 36 mm (1.4 in) long and 16 mm (0.63 in) wide.

== Subspecies ==
Two subspecies of Thelotornis capensis are recognized as being valid, including the nominotypical subspecies.

- Thelotornis capensis capensis A. Smith, 1849
- Thelotornis capensis oatesi (Günther, 1881)

Nota bene: A trinomial authority in parentheses indicates that the subspecies was originally described in a genus other than Thelotornis.

== Etymology ==
The subspecific name, oatesi, honors British naturalist Frank Oates.
