= Eugenio Ruspoli =

Italian explorer and naturalist (1866-1893)

- Born: 6 January 1866; Țigănești, Galați County, Romanian United Principalities
- Died: 4 December 1893 (aged 27) near Burgi, Somalia
- Occupation: Explorer
- Parents: Emanuele Ruspoli, 1st Prince of Poggio Suasa (father); Cocuța Conachi (mother)

Prince Eugenio Ruspoli (Țigănești, 6 January 1866 – near Burgi, Somalia, 4 December 1893) was an Italian explorer and naturalist. He was the author of the book Nel Paese della Mirra, published in 1892.

== Biography ==
Ruspoli belonged to the noble Roman and Florentine Ruspoli family, which was related to the House of Bonaparte. He was the second son of Emanuele Ruspoli, 1st Prince of Poggio Suasa, a politician, and his first wife, the Romanian princess Cocuța Conachi. He is remembered for two expeditions in Somalia.

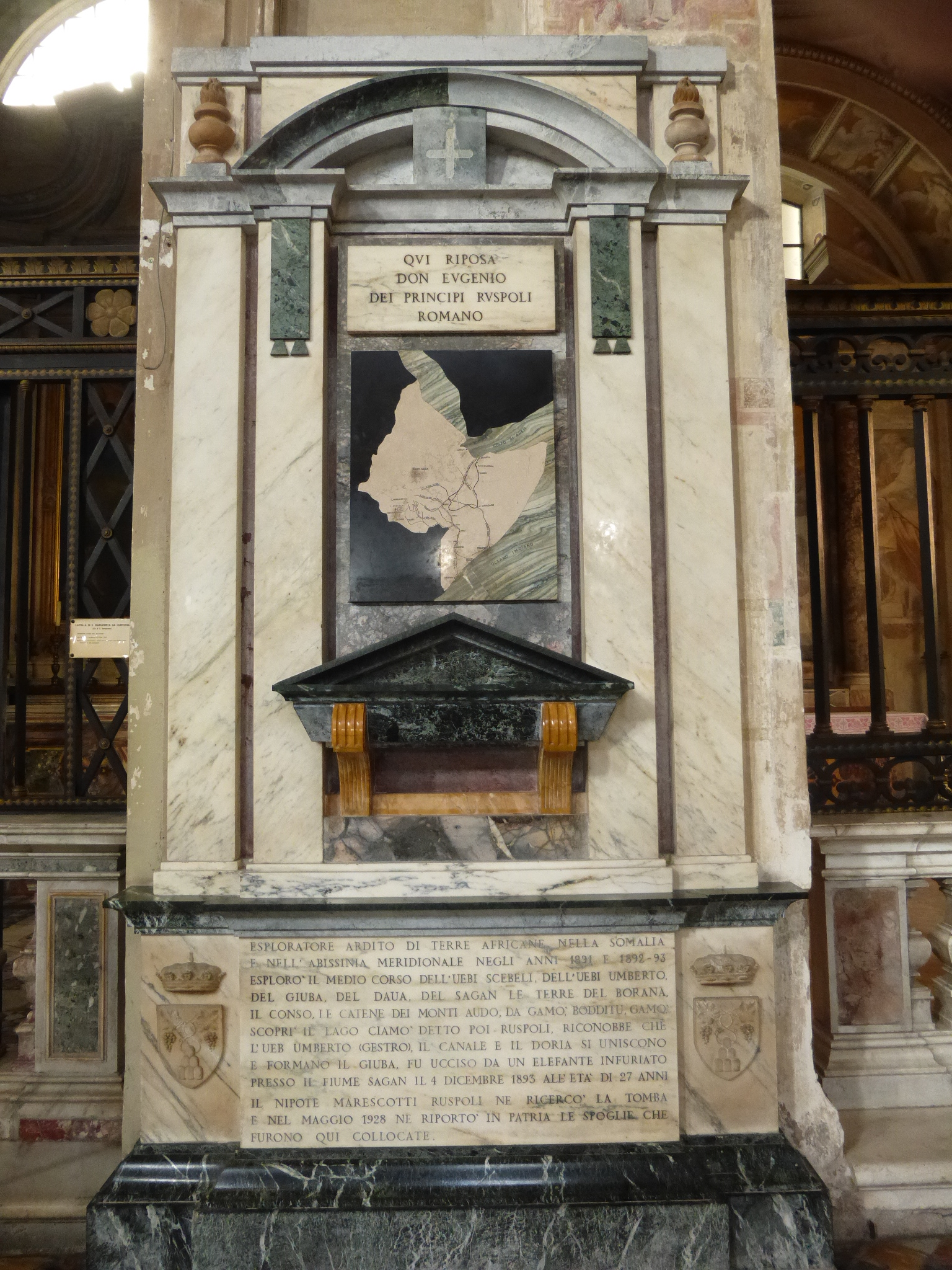
Rome, Tomb of Don Eugenio Ruspoli at the Basilica of Santa Maria in Ara Coeli.

Prince Eugenio Ruspoli was inspired to explore Africa by meeting the Polish Count Frackenstein. His expeditions were financed by his father. He first explored Ethiopia and Somalia beginning in 1891. Traveling southwards from Berbera, he crossed the Ogaden to the Shebelle River. He brought important zoological, botanical, mineralogical and ethnographic materials back to Italy. These collections included 183 birds, including specimens of four newly discovered species. His second expedition took place from 1892 to 1893, when he passed through Bardera on 3 April 1892, in order to confirm a convention stipulating the Kingdom of Italy's protectorate over the region. He then descended the Jubba River as far as Dolo and explored the interior of the country, discovering Lake Chamo, which he named "Lake Umberto" in honor of King Umberto I of Italy. He also reached Lugh from the north. During his expeditions, Ruspoli and his indigenous companions massacred natives and robbed villages.

Ruspoli died, unmarried and without heirs, in a hunting accident near Burgi, in Somalia. Along with Vittorio Bottego, he was attempting to travel up the Jubba River to Lake Rudolph. Ruspoli was killed 150 miles (240 km) from his destination on 4 December 1893. According to the account American explorer Arthur Donaldson Smith heard from one of the Amhara people, Ruspoli fired at an elephant which grasped him in its trunk, swung him about in the air and then trampled him to death. He was buried among the graves of Amhara chiefs. The lake he had discovered was later renamed Ruspoli by Bottego.

In 1896, ornithologist Tommaso Salvadori named Ruspoli's turaco after him. This bird had been collected by Ruspoli in 1892 or 1893, but the precise location and date of its collection are unknown due to Ruspoli's untimely death and failure to leave notes. Along with his traveling companion, Domenico Riva, Ruspoli also discovered the orchid Aerangis somalensis. Many years later, his nephew Marescotti Ruspoli (who died at El Alamein in 1942) found Ruspoli's tomb in Somalia and brought back his remains, which were buried in May 1928 in the Basilica of Santa Maria in Ara Coeli in Rome.

Streets in Genoa and Padua are also named after Ruspoli.

Ruspoli is commemorated in the scientific names of two species and one subspecies of African reptiles: Hemidactylus ruspolii, a gecko; Prosymna ruspolii, a snake; and Chameleo dilepis ruspolii, a lizard.

He is also honoured in the names of plants, including a genus Ruspolia (in the Acanthaceae family), and several other species such as Indigofera ruspoli Baker f., and Lopriorea ruspolii (Lopr.) Schinz.
