= Lopriorea =

Scientific classification
- Kingdom: Plantae
- Clade: Tracheophytes
- Clade: Angiosperms
- Clade: Eudicots
- Order: Caryophyllales
- Family: Amaranthaceae
- Genus: Lopriorea; Schinz (1911)
- Species: L. ruspolii

Binomial name
- Lopriorea ruspolii (Lopr.) Schinz (1911)

Synonyms
- Psilotrichum ruspolii Lopr. (1899)

Species of flowering plant

Lopriorea is a monotypic genus of flowering plants belonging to the family Amaranthaceae. The only species is Lopriorea ruspolii.

It is native to Ethiopia, Somalia and Kenya.

The genus name of Lopriorea is in honour of Giuseppe Lopriore (1865–1928), an Italian professor of botany at the institute of oenology in Catania and also botanical garden director. He was also director of the agricultural research station in Modena. The Latin specific epithet of ruspolii refers to Eugenio Ruspoli (1866–1893), an Italian explorer and naturalist. Both genus and species were first described and published in Vierteljahrsschr. Naturf. Ges. Zürich Vol.56 on pages 251-252 in 1911.
