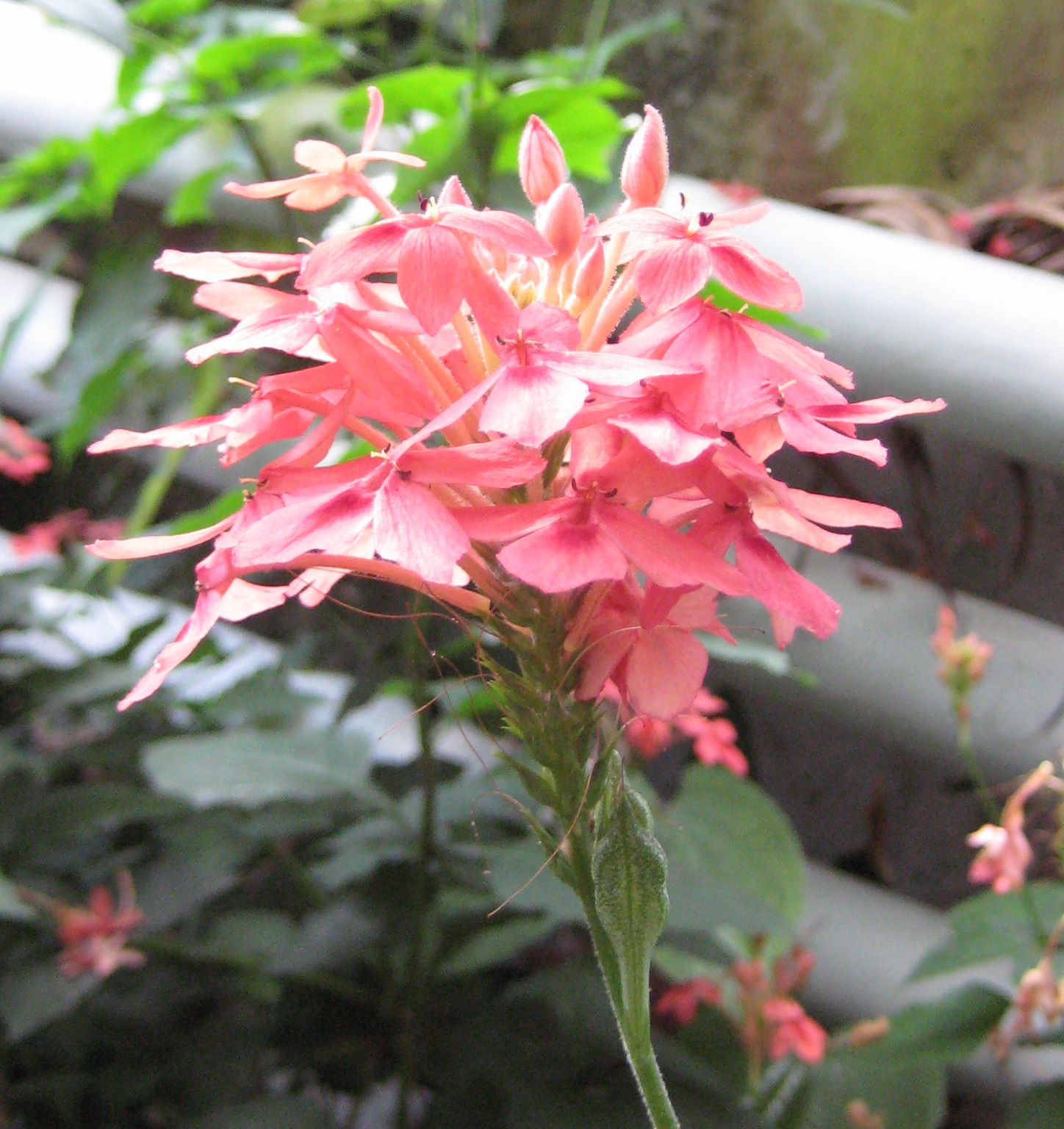
- Ruspolia seticalyx

Scientific classification
- Kingdom: Plantae
- Clade: Tracheophytes
- Clade: Angiosperms
- Clade: Eudicots
- Clade: Asterids
- Order: Lamiales
- Family: Acanthaceae
- Genus: Ruspolia; Lindau (1895)

= Ruspolia (plant) =

Genus of plants

Ruspolia is a genus of flowering plants belonging to the family Acanthaceae.

== Description ==
A genus of shrubby herbs or shrubs. The leaves are arranged opposite, they have visible linear cystoliths. The flowers are in spikes or panicles, or in 3-7-flowered, cymules aggregated into long raceme-like cymes. The flower has bracts and bracteoles (small bracts) that are narrow and inconspicuous. The flower calyx is deeply 5-lobed, with narrow, or linear-lanceolate or filiform (thread-like) shaped lobes. Sometimes with thread-like tips. The corolla-tube is narrowly cylindrical, and long and linear. it is divided into 5 subequal lobes, which are spreading or reflexed. The corolla (petals of the flower) are usually red, but may be salmon-pink, scarlet or orange-red. They are also hairy and sometimes glandular, on the outside. It has 2 stamens which are just exserted (projected beyond the corolla-tube). They have anthers which are 1-celled. The ovary is 2-celled with 2 ovules in each cell or loculus. Meaning it has 2-4-seeds. It has a filiform (thread-like) shaped style. The fruit or seed capsule is club-shaped, with solid stalk-like basal part. Inside the capsule, the seeds are smooth and glabrous or variously ornamented. They are situated on prominent hook-shaped retinaculas (thick fibres), without hygroscopic hairs.

It has a chromosome count of 2n=21

== Distribution and habitat ==
Its native range is Tropical Africa, southern Africa and Madagascar. It is found in Angola, Botswana, Cameroon, Central African Republic, Chad, Ethiopia, Ghana, Guinea, Guinea-Bissau, Kenya, Malawi, Mali, Mozambique, Nigeria, Senegal, Sierra Leone, Somalia, South Africa (in KwaZulu-Natal and the Northern Provinces) Sudan, Tanzania, Togo, Uganda, Zambia, Zaïre and Zimbabwe.

=== Habitat ===
Lowland and medium elevation woodland, bushland and dry forests.

== Taxonomy ==
The genus name of Ruspolia is in honour of Eugenio Ruspoli (1866–1893), an Italian explorer and naturalist. It was first described and published in H.G.A.Engler & K.A.E.Prantl, Nat. Pflanzenfam. Vol.4 (Issue 3b) on page 354 in 1895. The genus was recognized on 23 January 2009, by the United States Department of Agriculture and the Agricultural Research Service, but they do not list any known species.

== Known species ==
According to Kew:

- Ruspolia australis (Milne-Redh.) Vollesen
- Ruspolia decurrens (Hochst. ex Nees) Milne-Redh.
- Ruspolia hypocrateriformis (Vahl) Milne-Redh.
- Ruspolia seticalyx (C.B.Clarke) Milne-Redh.

GRIN accepts just Ruspolia hypocrateriformis (Vahl) Milne-Redh. and Ruspolia seticalyx (C. B. Clarke) Milne-Redh.. Other sources claim that there are up to 6 species Flora of Zimbabwe notes 5 species in Africa and Madagascar, (3 within Zimbabwe: Ruspolia australis, Ruspolia decurrens and Ruspolia seticalyx).

Ruspolia hypocrateriformis (or 'Red Ruspolia'), is used as a garden shrub in South Africa and Namibia.

== Other sources ==
- Daniel Oliver, Flora of Tropical Africa, Volume 5, L. Reeve and Company, 1900
