= Frank Oates =

British naturalist and explorer

Francis Oates (1840–1875) was a British naturalist, explorer, and uncle of the Antarctic explorer, Lawrence Oates. He was one of the first Europeans to see the Victoria Falls.

== Early life ==
The second son of Edward Oates (1792–1865), of Meanwoodside, near Leeds, Yorkshire and Furnival's Inn, and his wife Susan (d. 1889), daughter of Edward Grace, J.P., Frank Oates was born at Meanwoodside in 1840. The Oates family were landed gentry, owning land around Leeds and Dewsbury since the 16th century. He was educated at Christ Church, Oxford, which he entered late in 1860, but left before taking a degree. This was due to severe ill health, and he was an invalid for some years after 1864.

Oates' first significant expedition was to Central America and North America, and lasted one year, from 1871–1872. Most of this time was spent collecting bird and insect specimens in Guatemala, though he travelled widely and spent some weeks camping in the mountains of California. Upon his return to Britain, he was elected a fellow of the Royal Geographical Society.

== African Expedition ==
Accompanied by his brother (William Edward Oates) Oates set sail for Africa in 1873, leaving Southampton in March and arriving in Natal two months later. His original plan was to travel to the Zambesi and explore the area north of the river then unknown to Europeans. This territory was occasioning much interest at the time: in King Solomon's Mines, published in 1885, Haggard locates the fictional land of Kukuanas there.

Salt Pan, Bamangwato: An engraving based upon a watercolour by Frank Oates.

After outfitting his party in Pietermaritzburg, Oates travelled to the Transvaal, reaching Pretoria in June. He was not impressed with the town – which, he claimed, lacked even a book shop – or the people: "I fear the English who are here are a bad lot, with few exceptions. One man who cheated me I asked if he had a conscience. He replied that no one here had one".

Travelling north-west to Shoshong in the Bamangwato region, the next leg of the journey took the brothers to Tati and then Gubulweyo. From here Oates explored the central portion of Matabeleland, traveling to Inyati and finally reaching the Umgwanya River in October 1873. W. E. Oates returned to England at the end of 1873.

The Baobab tree is one of the curiosities described by Oates in his journals: "The tree was perfectly gigantic in girth, thickening as it got higher, though of no great height. It was swollen and bloated in a most extraordinary manner ... Though still flourishing, it was a mere shell, and, looking in at a hole in the side, I saw that it was open to the sky at the top. Inside is a good-sized chamber, strewed with minute bones of rats or some small mammalia. No doubt generations of owls have long had their abode here; one flew out at our approach".

The final leg of Oates' journey took him through western Matabeleland to Victoria Falls. Delayed by poor weather and the hostility of local tribes, he finally reached the falls on 31 December 1874. Oates was one of the first few Europeans to see the falls in full flood. He died of a fever on 5 February, while returning to Tati.

Camp in the Veldt: An engraving based upon a watercolour by Frank Oates.

Oates' legacy, a voluminous set of journals and letters home, was collected and edited by his brother, Charles George Oates and published in 1881. This work contains detailed descriptions of flora and fauna plus drawings and detailed maps based on Oates' observation. There is a permanent exhibit dedicated to Frank Oates at The Oates Museum at Selborne in Hampshire.

Frank Oates is much admired for his indomitability of spirit. "I like anything," he once said, "that seems difficult of attainment".

A subspecies of African snake, Thelotornis capensis oatesii, is named in his honour.

== See also ==
- Falcon College, Zimbabwe
- Matabele land and the Victoria Falls; a naturalist's wanderings in the interior of South Africa (1881)
