= Thrasops flavigularis =

Conservation status
- Least Concern (IUCN 3.1)

Scientific classification
- Kingdom: Animalia
- Phylum: Chordata
- Class: Reptilia
- Order: Squamata
- Suborder: Serpentes
- Family: Colubridae
- Genus: Thrasops
- Species: T. flavigularis

Binomial name
- Thrasops flavigularis (Hallowell, 1852)

Species of snake

Thrasops flavigularis, the yellow-throated bold-eyed tree snake , is a species of snake of the family Colubridae.

The snake is found in central Africa.
