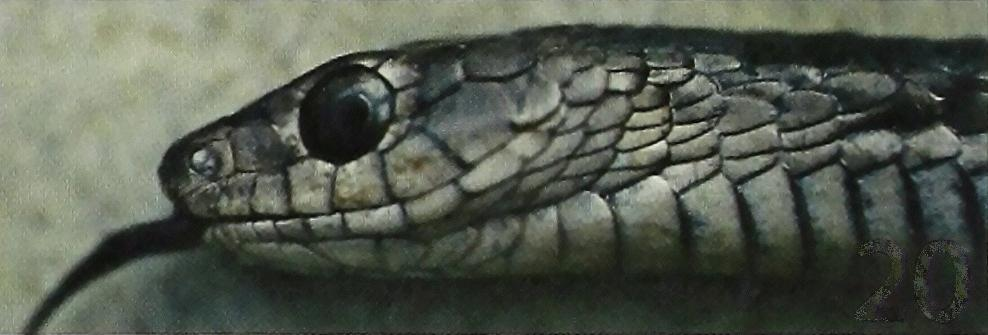

Conservation status
- Least Concern (IUCN 3.1)

Scientific classification
- Kingdom: Animalia
- Phylum: Chordata
- Class: Reptilia
- Order: Squamata
- Suborder: Serpentes
- Family: Colubridae
- Genus: Thrasops
- Species: T. occidentalis

Binomial name
- Thrasops occidentalis Parker, 1940

= Thrasops occidentalis =

Species of snake

Thrasops occidentalis, commonly known as the western black tree snake or black tree snake, is a species of arboreal snake in the family Colubridae. The snake is found in West Africa.

== Distribution and habitat ==
Thrasops occidentalis is found in the humid zone of West Africa from Senegal to Nigeria. It is a diurnal and arboreal species associated with both rain and gallery forests.

== Behavior and ecology ==
=== Diet and reproduction ===
The diet of Thrasops occidentalis consists of small mammals (rodents and bats), birds, and lizards. The species is oviparous, meaning it lays eggs.

== Conservation status ==
Thrasops occidentalis is listed as "Least Concern" on the IUCN Red List. No specific threats to it are known.
