= Dispholidus punctatus =

Scientific classification
- Kingdom: Animalia
- Phylum: Chordata
- Class: Reptilia
- Order: Squamata
- Suborder: Serpentes
- Family: Colubridae
- Genus: Dispholidus
- Species: D. punctatus

Binomial name
- Dispholidus punctatus Laurent, 1955

Species of snake

Dispholidus punctatus is a species of venomous snake in the family Colubridae. The species is found in Angola, Zambia, and the Democratic Republic of the Congo.
