= Dispholidus pembae =

Scientific classification
- Kingdom: Animalia
- Phylum: Chordata
- Class: Reptilia
- Order: Squamata
- Suborder: Serpentes
- Family: Colubridae
- Genus: Dispholidus
- Species: D. pembae

Binomial name
- Dispholidus pembae Hughes, 2021

Species of snake

Dispholidus pembae is a species of venomous snake in the family Colubridae. The species is found on Pemba Island in Tanzania.
