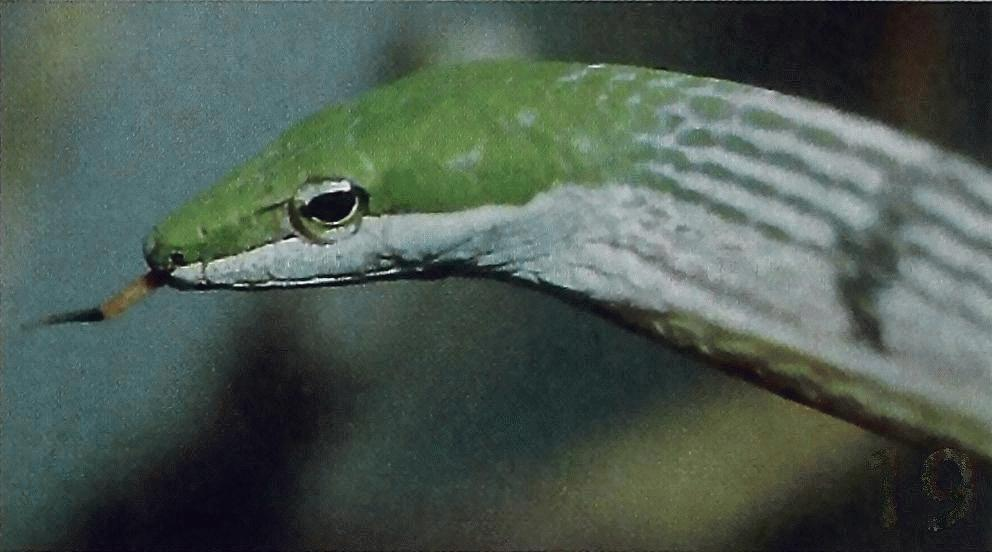

Conservation status
- Least Concern (IUCN 3.1)

Scientific classification
- Kingdom: Animalia
- Phylum: Chordata
- Class: Reptilia
- Order: Squamata
- Suborder: Serpentes
- Family: Colubridae
- Genus: Thelotornis
- Species: T. kirtlandii

Binomial name
- Thelotornis kirtlandii (Hallowell, 1844)

Synonyms
- Leptophis kirtlandii Hallowell, 1844; Dryophis kirtlandii (Hallowell, 1844); Oxybelis kirtlandii (Hallowell, 1844)

= Forest vine snake =

Species of snake

The forest vine snake (Thelotornis kirtlandii), also known commonly as the forest twig snake or simply the twig snake, and as the bird snake (as are other members of the genus Thelotornis), is a species of venomous snake in the subfamily Colubrinae of the family Colubridae. The species is endemic to Africa.

== Description ==
As an adult, T. kirtlandii usually has a total length (including tail) of 0.9–1.4 m (3.0–4.6 ft). The maximum recorded total length is 1.6 m (5.2 ft). The body and tail are very thin and are cylindrical in cross section. The tail is very long, 33% to 42% of the total length. The dorsal scales are arranged in 19 rows at midbody, and are feebly keeled. The top of the head is green, and the upper labials and chin are white. Dorsally, the body and tail are grayish brown. Ventrally, the snake is light gray, speckled with black.

== Etymology ==
The specific name, kirtlandii, is in honor of American naturalist Jared Potter Kirtland.

== Geographic range ==
T. kirtlandii is found in Sub-Saharan Africa, south to a latitude of about 17° S. It has been recorded from Angola, Benin, Cameroon, Central African Republic, Congo, DR Congo, Equatorial Guinea, Gabon, Ghana, Guinea, Guinea-Bissau, Ivory Coast, Kenya, Liberia, Nigeria, Sierra Leone, Somalia, Tanzania, Togo, Uganda, and Zambia.

== Habitat ==
The preferred natural habitats of T. kirtlandii are forest and savanna, at altitudes from sea level to 2,200 m (7,200 ft), but it is also found in artificial plantations.

== Behavior ==
T. kirtlandii is diurnal, and it is both arboreal and terrestrial.

== Diet ==
T. kirtlandii preys upon frogs, lizards, birds, and their eggs.

== Reproduction ==
T. kirtlandii is oviparous. Clutch size is four to ten eggs.

== Venom ==
T. kirtlandii produces a venom which is slow acting but potentially lethal. It causes non-clotting of blood and renal failure. There is no antivenom.
