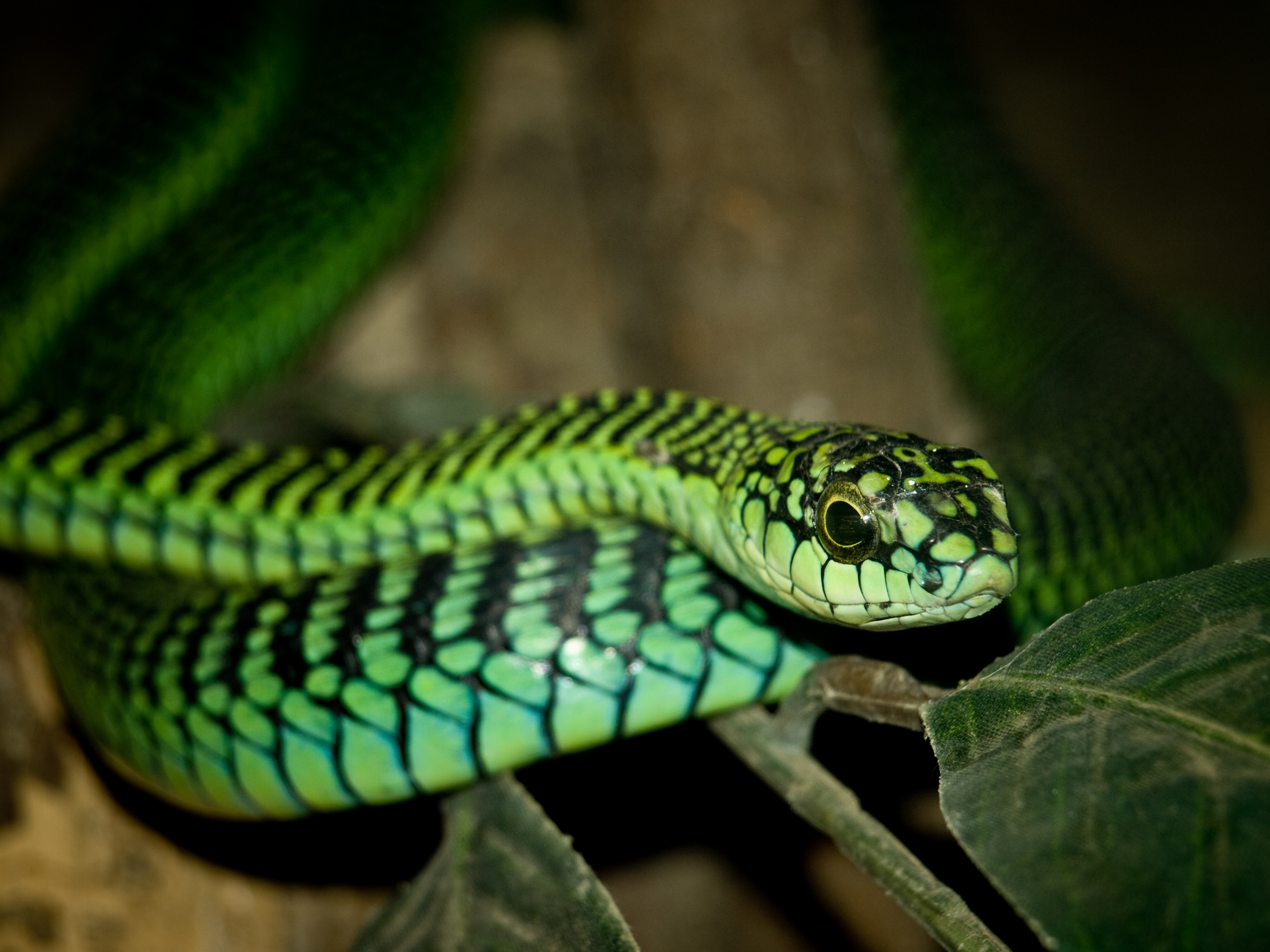
- Boomslang

Scientific classification
- Kingdom: Animalia
- Phylum: Chordata
- Class: Reptilia
- Order: Squamata
- Suborder: Serpentes
- Family: Colubridae
- Subfamily: Colubrinae
- Genus: Dispholidus; Duvernoy, 1832

= Dispholidus =

Genus of reptiles

Dispholidus is a genus of snakes belonging to the family Colubridae. The species of this genus are found in sub-Saharan Africa.

== Species ==
- Dispholidus pembae Hughes, 2021
- Dispholidus punctatus Laurent, 1955
- Dispholidus typus ((A. Smith, 1828)) – Boomslang
