= Thrasops jacksonii =

Conservation status
- Least Concern (IUCN 3.1)

Scientific classification
- Kingdom: Animalia
- Phylum: Chordata
- Class: Reptilia
- Order: Squamata
- Suborder: Serpentes
- Family: Colubridae
- Genus: Thrasops
- Species: T. jacksonii

Binomial name
- Thrasops jacksonii Günther, 1895

Synonyms
- Thrasops jacksonii Günther, 1895; Rhamnophis jacksonii — Boulenger, 1896; Thrasops Rothschildsi Mocquard, 1905; Thrasops jacksonii — Schmidt, 1923

Species of snake

Thrasops jacksonii, known commonly as the black tree snake or Jackson's black tree snake, is a species of primarily arboreal and diurnal snake in the subfamily Colubrinae of the family Colubridae. The species is native to Central Africa, and has been discovered to possess a hemorrhagic venom, which it delivers to prey through moderately-sized fangs.

== Geographic range ==
T. jacksonii is found in Angola, Burundi, Cameroon, Central African Republic, Democratic Republic of the Congo, Gabon, Kenya, the Republic of the Congo, Rwanda, South Sudan, Tanzania, Uganda and Zambia.

== Habitat ==
The preferred natural habitats of T. jacksonii are forest and savanna, at altitudes of 549–2,400 m (1,801–7,874 ft).

== Description ==
T. jacksonii may attain a total length (including tail) of about 2.0 m (6.6 ft).

== Behavior ==
T. jacksonii is diurnal and arboreal, and has been found as high as 30 m (98 ft) in the canopy.

== Diet ==
A generalist, T. jacksonii preys upon frogs, arboreal lizards, birds and their eggs, and mammals.

== Reproduction ==
T. jacksonii is oviparous. Clutch size is 7–12 eggs.

== Etymology ==
The specific name, jacksonii, is in honor of English ornithologist Frederick John Jackson.
