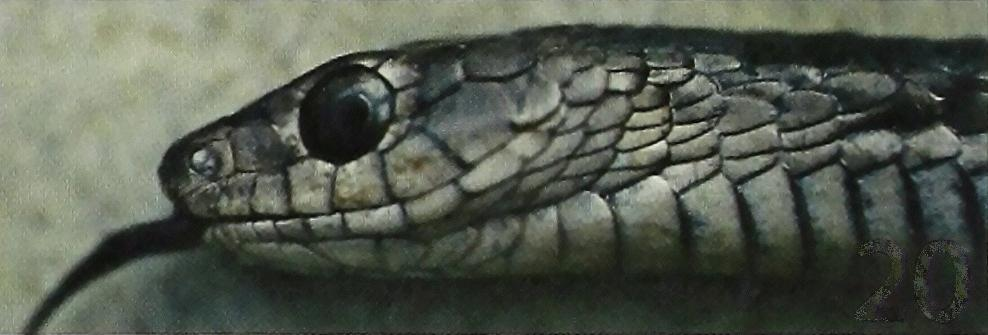
- Thrasops occidentalis

Scientific classification
- Kingdom: Animalia
- Phylum: Chordata
- Class: Reptilia
- Order: Squamata
- Suborder: Serpentes
- Family: Colubridae
- Subfamily: Colubrinae
- Genus: Thrasops; Hallowell, 1857

= Thrasops =

Genus of snakes

Thrasops is a genus of snakes in the family Colubridae. The genus is endemic to Africa.

== Species ==
- Thrasops flavigularis (Hallowell, 1852) – yellow-throated bold-eyed tree snake
- Thrasops jacksonii Günther, 1895 – black tree snake, Jackson’s black tree snake
- Thrasops occidentalis Parker, 1940 – black tree snake
- Thrasops schmidti Loveridge, 1936 – Schmidt’s bold-eyed tree snake

Nota bene: A binomial authority in parentheses indicates that the species was originally described in a genus other than Thrasops.

== Etymology ==
The generic name, Thrasops, is from Greek Θρασος (Thrasos) meaning "bold" and ὤψ (ops) meaning "eye".
