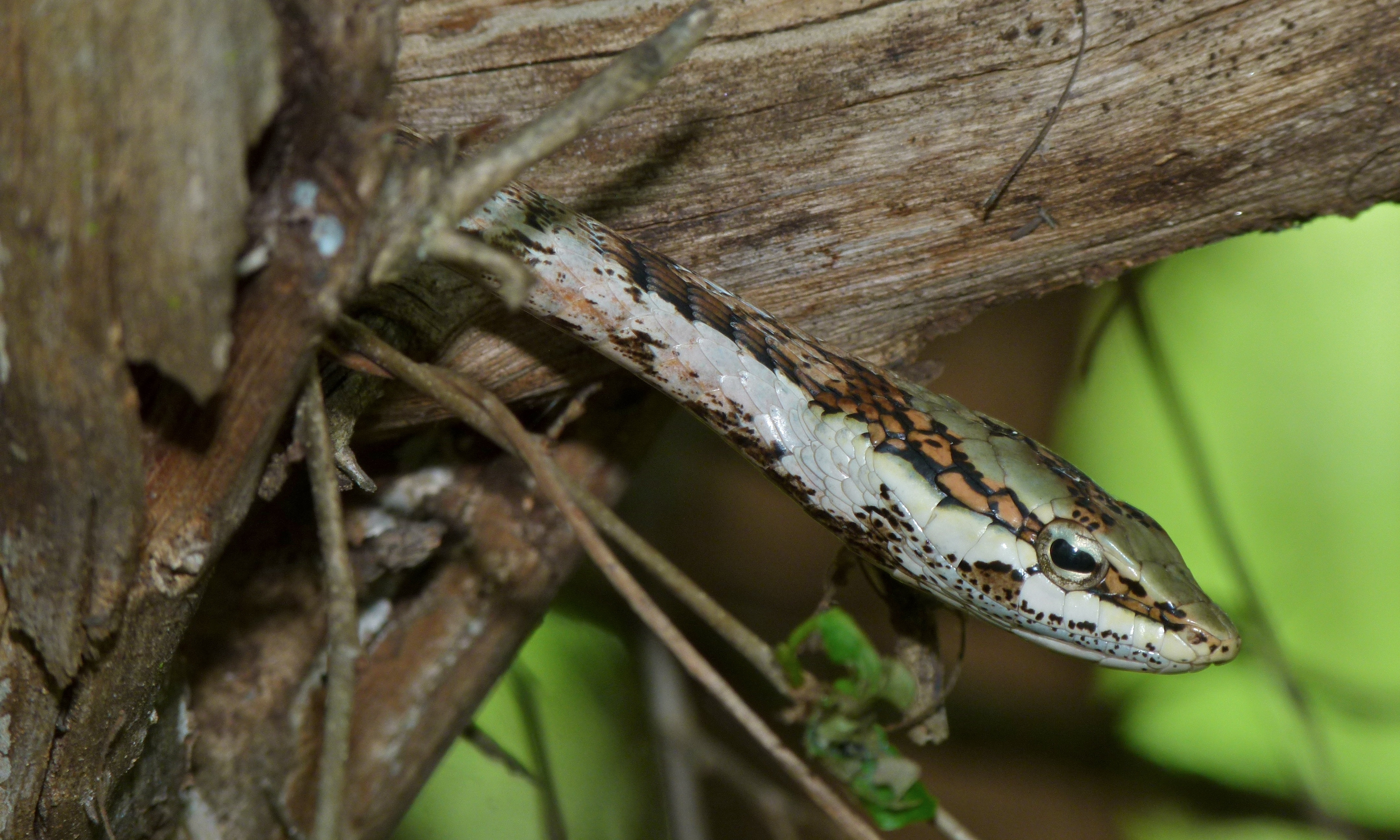
- T. capensis in Kruger NP, South Africa

Scientific classification
- Kingdom: Animalia
- Phylum: Chordata
- Class: Reptilia
- Order: Squamata
- Suborder: Serpentes
- Family: Colubridae
- Subfamily: Colubrinae
- Genus: Thelotornis; A. Smith, 1849

Species
- Four species, see text.

= Twig snake =

Genus of snakes

The twig snakes (genus Thelotornis), also commonly known as bird snakes or vine snakes, are a genus of rear-fanged venomous snakes in the family Colubridae. The genus is native to Africa. All species in the genus have a slender and elongated profile, a long tail, a narrow head and a pointed snout. The eye of all species has a horizontal pupil, shaped like a keyhole, which gives twig snakes binocular vision. Twig snakes are greyish-brown with faint light and dark markings. When threatened, they inflate the throat to display bold black markings between the scales. Twig snake bites are potentially deadly: the venom is hemotoxic, affecting the blood clotting mechanism and causing uncontrolled bleeding and internal hemorrhaging. Bites by twig snakes have caused death in humans; famous herpetologist Robert Mertens died after being bitten by his pet savanna vine snake (Thelotornis capensis). However, envenomed bites are extremely rare when not handling the snake, as the fangs can't breach the skin except in a few places like the web between the thumb and fingers.

== Species ==
The genus Thelotornis contains four species which are recognized as being valid.

Image	Scientific name	Common name	Distribution
	Thelotornis capensis A. Smith, 1849	Savanna vine snake	southern Africa.
	Thelotornis kirtlandii (Hallowell, 1844)	Forest vine snake	Angola, Benin, Cameroon, Central African Republic, Congo, DR Congo, Equatorial Guinea, Gabon, Ghana, Guinea, Guinea-Bissau, Ivory Coast, Kenya, Liberia, Nigeria, Sierra Leone, Somalia, Tanzania, Togo, Uganda, and Zambia.
	Thelotornis mossambicanus (Bocage, 1895)	Eastern vine snake	Eastern Africa.
	Thelotornis usambaricus Broadley, 2001	Usambara vine snake	Tanzania (East Usambara Mts), Kenya (coast), Mozambique

Nota bene: A binomial authority in parentheses indicates that the species was originally described in a genus other than Thelotornis.

== Anatomy and behaviour ==
Twig snakes are among the few rear-fanged colubrids whose bite is highly venomous and potentially fatal. The venom is hemotoxic, and although its effects are very slow and bites are rare, no antivenom has been developed and few fatalities (such as Robert Mertens) have occurred. They prey on birds, lizards and frogs, and conceal themselves in trees, though often at a low enough level to be able to also strike at terrestrial prey, which they may swallow upwards after killing. Their cryptic coloration and apparent ability to freeze or sway gently, as chameleons do, like a twig on a tree (hence the name), makes them hard to spot. Indeed, they may be more abundant in areas than is immediately obvious.

== Description ==
The African twig snakes are distinctive in appearance and unlikely on that continent to be mistaken for any other snake, if indeed the observer notices them. Thelotornis is characterised by a depressed and flat head, keyhole-shaped pupils, and in T. kirtlandii, a projecting canthus rostralis which forms a shallow loreal groove on each side of the head, which allows some binocular vision. In appearance, the head at least is unlikely to be mistaken for any other African snake. Other characteristics include a very long tail and large back fangs. The iris in T. capensis and T. kirtlandii is yellow, and presumably therefore also in T. usambaricus.

In this genus, the ectopterygoid bone is forked, the two branches articulating with the maxillary, a structure not found in other snakes.

== Gallery ==
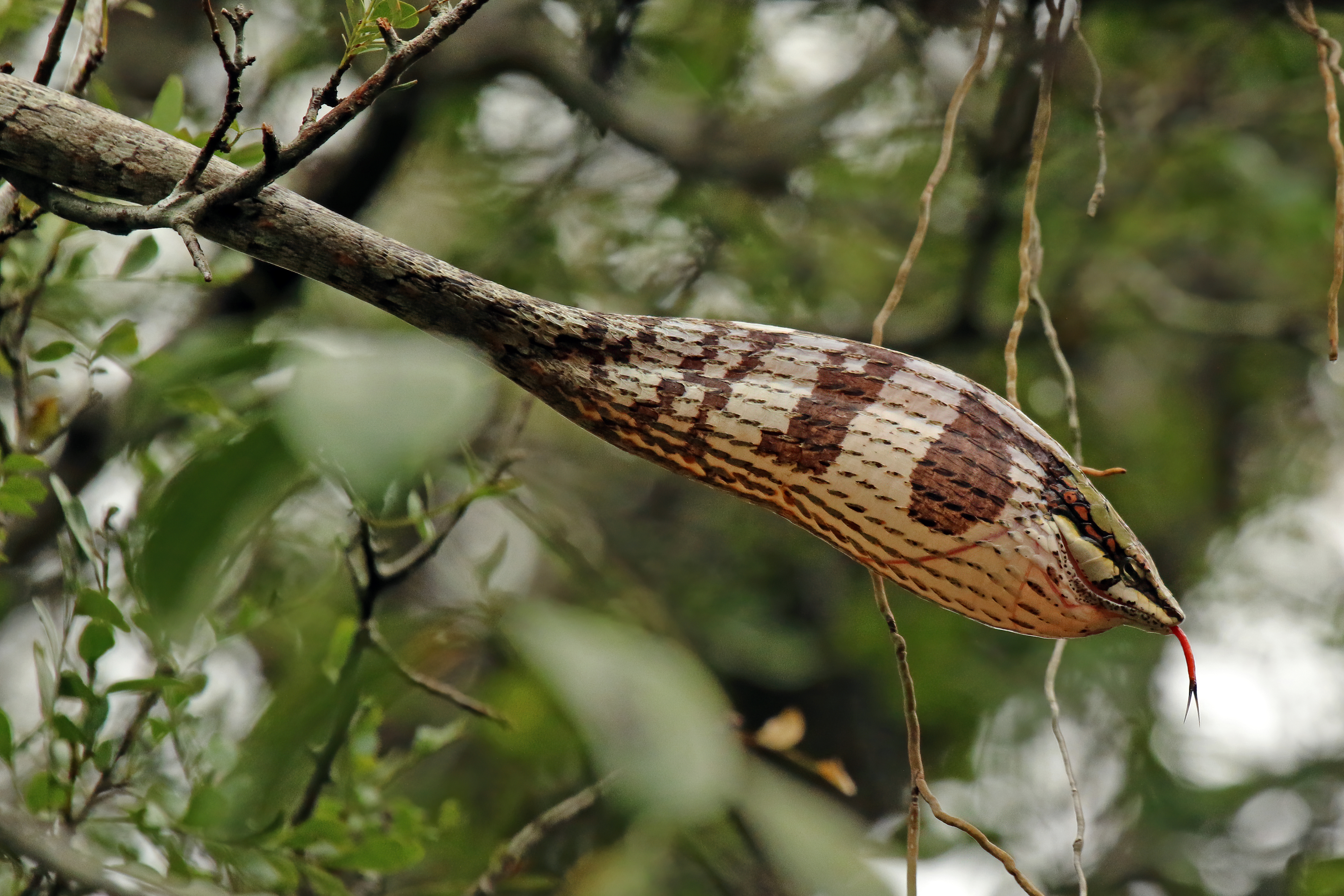
T. capensis

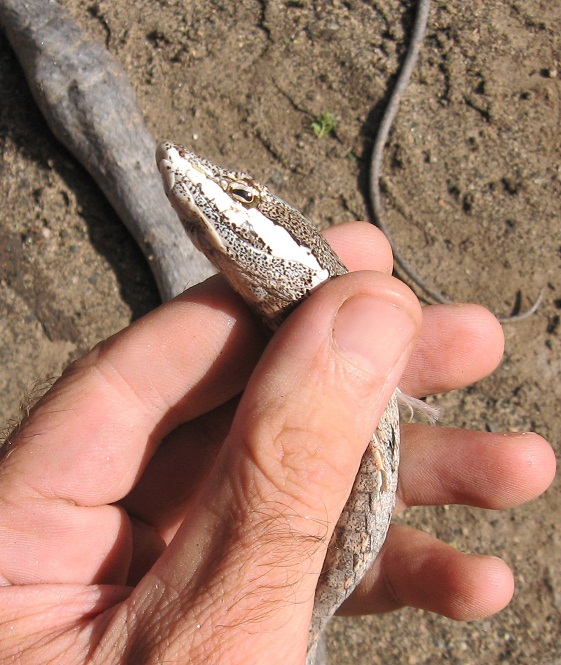
T. mossambicanus
