= False coral =

False coral may refer to many species of snakes, including:

- several species of the genus Erythrolamprus:
  - Erythrolamprus aesculapii, a mildly venomous colubrid snake species found in South America.
  - Erythrolamprus bizona, a harmless colubrid snake species found in South America.
  - Erythrolamprus ocellatus, a.k.a. the Tobago false coral, a harmless colubrid snake species found on the island of Tobago.
- several of species of the genus Oxyrhopus:
  - Oxyrhopus guibei, a nonvenomous South American snake.
  - Oxyrhopus petola, a mildly venomous colubrid snake species found in South America.
- both species of the genus Pliocercus
- the family Aniliidae, which contains one species

False coral may also refer to a species of bryozoan, Myriapora truncata.
