= Rio Cautário Federal Extractive Reserve =

Extractive reserve in Rondônia, Brazil

- Reserva Extrativista do Rio Cautário
- IUCN category VI (protected area with sustainable use of natural resources)
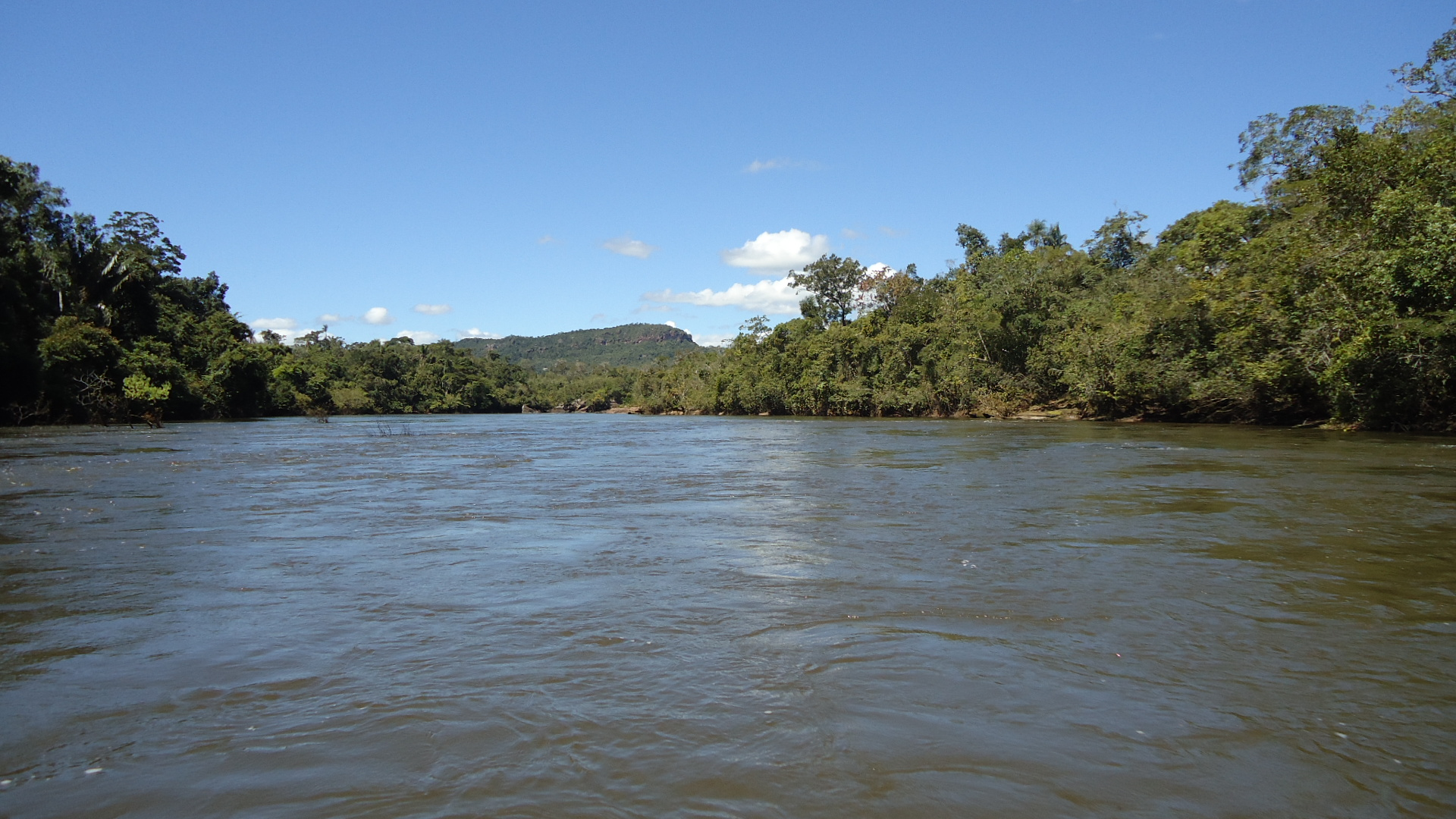
- Cautário River

- Location within Brazil
- Nearest city: Guajará-Mirim, Rondônia.
- Coordinates: 11°50′27″S 64°12′20″W
- Area: 73,818 hectares (182,410 acres)
- Designation: Extractive reserve
- Created: 7 August 2001
- Administrator: Chico Mendes Institute for Biodiversity Conservation

The Rio Cautário Federal Extractive Reserve (Portuguese: Reserva Extrativista do Rio Cautário) is an extractive reserve in the state of Rondônia, Brazil.

== Location ==
The Rio Cautário Federal Extractive Reserve is in the municipality of Guajará-Mirim, Rondônia. It has an area of 73,818 hectares (182,410 acres). The reserve adjoins the Serra da Cutia National Park along its northwest border. The Cautário River defines the southeast border of the reserve, running in a southwest direction to join the Guaporé River on the border with Bolivia. The Rio Cautário State Extractive Reserve adjoins the reserve on the other side of the Cautári River. The reserve is in a region of crucial importance for conserving biodiversity and natural resources of the Amazon biome, and for supporting the traditional populations and indigenous communities. It is in a strategic location in Rondônia, since the region has large areas used for livestock and for expansion of the agricultural frontier.

The Cautário River rises in the Uru-Eu-Wau-Wau Indigenous Territory and receives tributaries from the Serra Uopianes and the Serra Pacaás Novos. It has clear waters fed by a region without major deforestation and silting of the river's margins. It has rapids, but always with a drop of less than 2 metres (6 ft 7 in). The most rugged stretch is between Redenção e Bom Destino. It is navigable, even in the middle section around Bom Destino, but only in the rainy season. It flows into the Guaporé/Mamoré river.

== Environment ==
Average annual rainfall is 1,500 millimetres (59 in). Temperatures range from 18 to 30 °C (64 to 86 °F), with an average of 25 °C (77 °F). Altitudes range from 100 to 200 metres (330 to 660 ft).

Dense lowland rainforest covers 53.9% of the reserve. In the alluvial plain of the Cautário River there are significant patches of dense alluvial rainforest (10.65%), and open alluvial rain forest or flooded forest (7.81%). The northeast of the reserve has mountainous portions that contain rainforest / savanna contact (12.57%), wooded savannah (3.07%), parkland savanna (1.09%) and rocky outcrops (4.83%). Trees include Brazil nut trees and trees with value for their timber including Apuleia leiocarpa, Amburana acreana, Mezilaurus itauba, Cedrela odorata, Dinizia excelsa, Hymenolobium petraeum, Dipteryx odorata, Swietenia macrophylla, Erisma bicolor and Erisma uncinatum.

The Serra dos Pacaás Novos forms the boundary between two species of primate, Emilia's marmoset (Mico emiliae) to the north and black-tailed marmoset (Mico melanurus) to the south. The brown-mantled tamarin (Saguinus fuscicollis) is widespread in the reserve. The reserve holds a rich variety of bird species, but they have not been well studied.

Herpetofauna include a significant number of species that are known only in a few locations in Amazonia, and are therefore considered rare. These include the lizards Enyalioides laticeps, Enyalius leechii, Leposoma osvaldoi and Tupinambis longilineus, and the snakes Epictia diaplocia, Siagonodon septemstriatus, Drymobius rhombifer, Coluber mentovarius, Atractus insipidus, Erythrolamprus mimus, Ninia hudsoni, Oxyrhopus formosus, Oxyrhopus vanidicus, Siphlophis worontzowi, Micrurus mipartitus, Bothrocophias hyoprora and Bothrocophias microphthalmus. Species that occur in Amazonia only in savanna enclaves include the lizards Hoplocercus spinosus, Micrablepharus maximiliani and species of Kentropyx and Ameiva, and the snakes Epicrates crassus, Chironius flavolineatus, Drymoluber brazili, Oxyrhopus rhombifer, Pseudoboa nigra, Xenodon merremii, Bothrops mattogrossensis and Crotalus durissus.

== History ==
The Rio Cautário Federal Extractive Reserve was created by federal decree on 7 August 2001. It is administered by the Chico Mendes Institute for Biodiversity Conservation. It is classed as IUCN protected area category VI (protected area with sustainable use of natural resources). An extractive reserve is an area used by traditional extractive populations whose livelihood is based on extraction, subsistence agriculture and small-scale animal raising. Its basic objectives are to protect the livelihoods and culture of these people and to ensure sustainable use of natural resources.

On 6 July 2005 the Instituto Nacional de Colonização e Reforma Agrária (INCRA: National Institute for Colonisation and Agrarian Reform) recognised the reserve as meeting the needs of 22 families of small rural producers, who would qualify for PRONAF support. The deliberative council was created on 10 June 2009. On 24 December 2010 ICMBio grant the right to use the reserve for 20 years to the Associação dos Seringueiros do Vale do Guaporécessão (Association of Rubber Tappers of the Guaporécessão Valley). The management agreement was approved on 30 May 2014.

== Sources ==
- Resex Rio Cautário (in Portuguese), ICMBio: Chico Mendes Institute for Biodiversity Conservation
- RESEX do Rio Cautário (in Portuguese), ISA: Instituto Socioambiental
- Unidade de Conservação: Reserva Extrativista do Rio Cautário (in Portuguese), MMA: Ministério do Meio Ambiente
