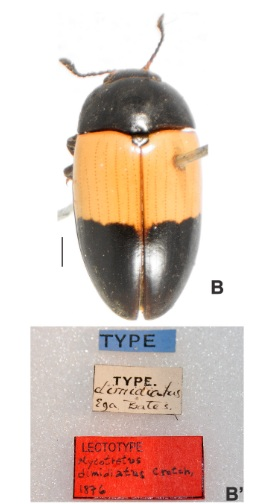

Scientific classification
- Kingdom: Animalia
- Phylum: Arthropoda
- Clade: Pancrustacea
- Class: Insecta
- Order: Coleoptera
- Suborder: Polyphaga
- Infraorder: Cucujiformia
- Family: Erotylidae
- Genus: Mycotretus
- Species: M. seminiger

Binomial name
- Mycotretus seminiger Harold, 1876

Synonyms
- Mycotretus dimidiatus Crotch, 1876 (non Taschenberg, 1870: preoccupied)

= Mycotretus seminiger =

Species of beetle

Mycotretus seminiger is a Brazilian beetle species in the pleasing fungus beetle family (Erotylidae). Among its family, this species is placed in subfamily Tritominae, or – in taxonomic arrangements that prefer a more comprehensive subfamily Erotylinae – in tribe Tritomini of the Erotylinae.

This species was first described as "Mycotretus dimidiatus" by George Crotch in 1876. However, Crotch was unaware that the same name had also been used by Ernst Taschenberg six years earlier for a related beetle species. Edgar von Harold, who was aware of both authors' works, quickly fixed the problem by proposing M.seminiger as a replacement name, which has stood since then.

The lectotype was designated in 2023; it is one of the specimens collected 1848-1859 by Henry Bates at "Ega" (now Tefé in Amazonas State, Brazil), and still resides in the Crotch collection at UMZC. Crotch also had another specimen with no further data. A more recent specimen, MNRJ 20-38-A, was collected in November 1962 by Werner Bokermann. It is a male from Forte Príncipe da Beira; its genitals were extracted for detailed study, but MNRJ 20-38-A may have been lost in 2018. The mere two known collection sites – between 75–150 m (250–500 ft) AMSL – still indicate a range in the upper Amazon Basin extending at least between the lower Juruá in the northwest and the lower Guaporé in the southeast, and across the middle Purus and Madeira Rivers.
