= Rio Cautário State Extractive Reserve =

Extractive reserve in Rondônia, Brazil

- Reserva Extrativista Estadual Rio Cautário
- IUCN category VI (protected area with sustainable use of natural resources)
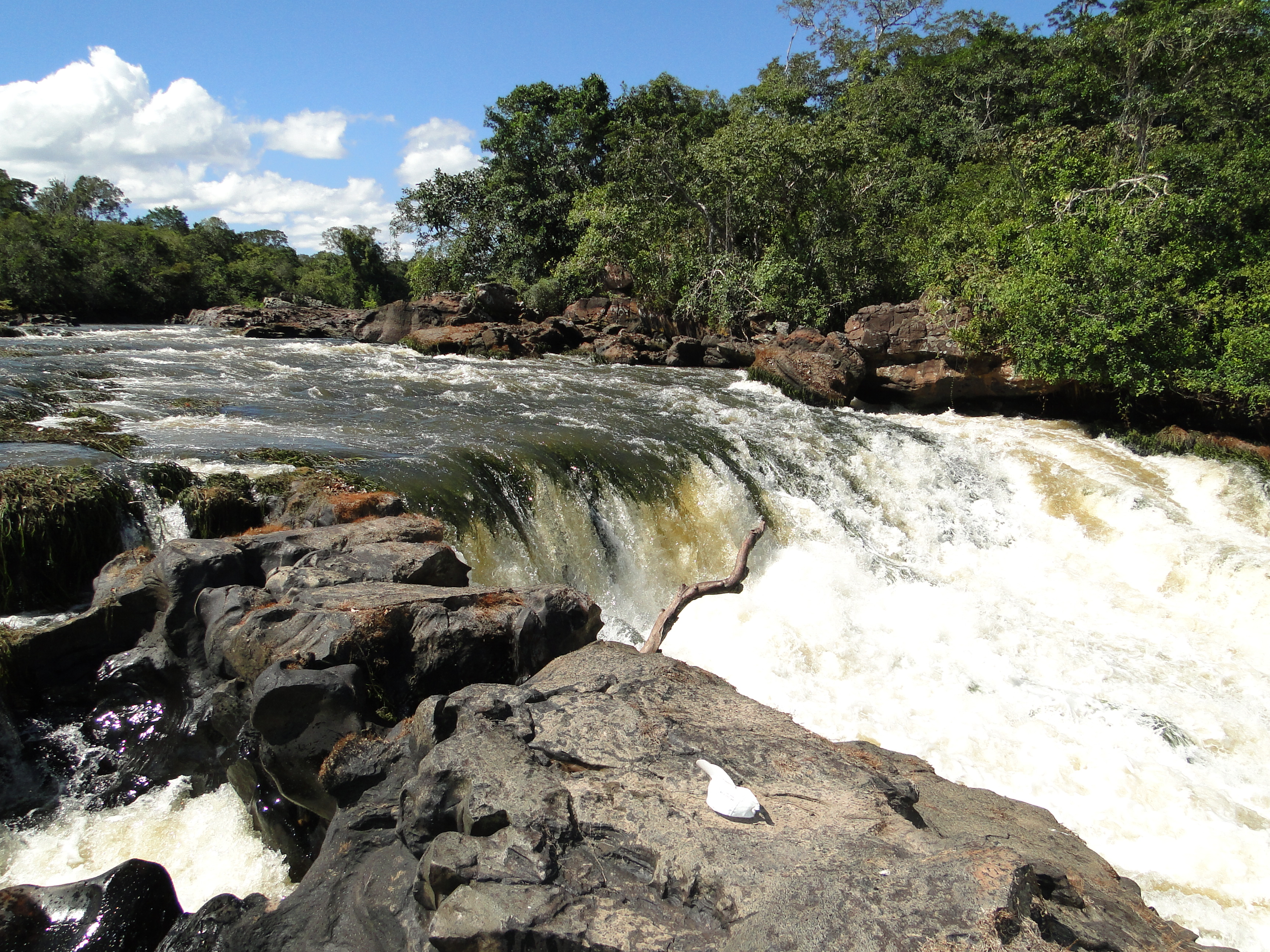
- Falls on the Cautário River

- Location within Brazil
- Nearest city: Costa Marques, Rondônia
- Coordinates: 12°02′54″S 64°17′30″W
- Area: 146,400 hectares (362,000 acres)
- Designation: Extractive reserve
- Created: 8 August 1995
- Administrator: Secretaria de Estado do Desenvolvimento Ambiental (Rondônia)

The Rio Cautário State Extractive Reserve (Portuguese: Reserva Extrativista Estadual Rio Cautário) is an extractive reserve in the state of Rondônia, Brazil.

== Location ==
The Rio Cautário State Extractive Reserve is divided between the municipalities of Guajará-Mirim (47.5%) and Costa Marques (52.5%) in the state of Rondônia. It has an area of 146,400 hectares (362,000 acres). The reserve lies to the northwest of the BR-429 highway from São Francisco do Guaporé to Costa Marques on the border with Bolivia. It adjoins the Rio Cautário Federal Extractive Reserve to the north of its eastern part, separated from the federal reserve by the Cautário River. The Cautário River runs through the west part of the reserve to join the Guaporé River on the border with Bolivia. In the southwest the reserve is bounded by the Guaporé River.

== Environment ==
The Cautário River is a meandering river with clear water. The depth does not exceed 2 to 3 metres (6 ft 7 in to 9 ft 10 in) in the dry season, and about 5 to 6 metres (16 to 20 ft) in the short season of high water. The river rises in the Uru-Eu-Wau-Wau Indigenous Territory and receives tributaries from the Serra Uopianes and the Serra Pacaás Novos. It is fed by a region without major deforestation and silting of the river's margins. It has rapids, but always with a drop of less than 2 metres (6 ft 7 in). The most rugged stretch is between Redenção e Bom Destino. It is navigable, even in the middle section around Bom Destino, but only in the rainy season.

During the wet season extensive areas of the forest are flooded. The climate is hot and humid, with temperatures of 24 to 26 °C (75 to 79 °F) throughout the year. Annual rainfall varies from 1,400 to 2,500 millimetres (55 to 98 in). Altitudes range from 100 to 250 metres (330 to 820 ft). The reserve is covered by open submontane rainforest (63%), pioneer alluvial formations (15.5%), dense alluvial rainforest (8.6%) and savanna (6.5%). The forest is well-preserved near the waterways.

== History ==
On 18 November 1991 a ban was placed on settlement, deforestation, professional fishing, logging, mining and other activities in the proposed 151,625 hectares (374,670 acres) Rio Cautário Sustainable Extraction State Forest. This ban did not apply to the small farmers, rubber tappers and fishing people living in the area.

The Rio Cautário State Extractive Reserve was created by state decree 7.028 of 8 August 1995 with an area of about 146,499 hectares (362,010 acres) to support conservation and sustainable use of natural resources by the extractive population. It was placed under the Instituto de Terras e Colonização of Rondônia State (ITERON). The decree creating the reserve noted the great pressure of predatory activity on forest areas occupied by traditional populations, which was causing irreversible loss of plant and wildlife resources, and exacerbating social conflicts. On 30 June 2004 an area of 142,776 hectares (352,810 acres) of federal land was transferred to the state of use in the extractive reserve. The deliberative council was created on 21 August 2009.

As of 2016 the reserve was supported by the Amazon Region Protected Areas Program (ARPA). In January 2016 SEDAM announced findings of illegal activity in the previous quarter in nine units that benefited from ARPA in the state. In the Rio Cautário State Extractive Reserve and the Serra dos Reis State Park they had seized a motorcycle, a tractor and six trucks loaded with 695 cubic metres (24,500 cu ft) of logs and 105 cubic metres (3,700 cu ft) of sawed timber, 930 wooden stakes and various camping and fishing items.

== Economy ==
The area has been used for rubber extraction for more than 100 years, but only 6.5% of the land has been altered by human occupation. The residents earn income from production of flour and other agricultural products. There are five communities in the reserve. There are two schools, although only one was operating in 2011, and two health centres. The reserve is managed by the Associação de Seringueiros do Vale do Guaporé (AGUAPÉ). Residents strongly support AGUAPÉ, one of the best organised of such associations in the state.

There is a usage plan and a development plan created through technical cooperation between the United Nations Development Programme and Rondônia. There is also a plan for community forest management created due to decline in demand for rubber. The plan is to extract wood from 500 hectares (1,200 acres) per year in a managed area of 15,000 hectares (37,000 acres) Two serious obstacles to managing the reserve are its inaccessibility and the illiteracy of the leaders.

== Sources ==
- Full list: PAs supported by ARPA, ARPA
- Ivo Narciso Cassol (21 August 2009), Decreto nº 14.497, de 21 de Agosto de 2009 (PDF) (in Portuguese)
- RESEX Rio Cautário (Estadual) (in Portuguese), ISA: Instituto Socioambiental
- "Sedam divulga resultado de fiscalização de unidades de conservação de Rondônia", Rondoniagora (in Portuguese), 6 January 2016
- Unidade de Conservação: Reserva Extrativista do Rio Cautário (in Portuguese), MMA: Ministério do Meio Ambiente
- Verônica Belchior (2011), Comunidades de seringueiros das Reservas Extrativistas do Rio Cautário, RO: Aspectos socioeconômicos, percepção ambiental e potenciais conflitos na interação com a fauna (PDF) (Thesis) (in Portuguese), Juiz De Fora: Universidade Federal de Juiz de Fora
- Valdir Raupp De Matos (8 August 1995), Decreto nº 7.028, de 08 de Agosto de 1995 (PDF) (in Portuguese)
