= Shaw's dark ground snake =

Conservation status
- Least Concern (IUCN 3.1)

Scientific classification
- Kingdom: Animalia
- Phylum: Chordata
- Class: Reptilia
- Order: Squamata
- Suborder: Serpentes
- Family: Colubridae
- Subfamily: Dipsadinae
- Genus: Erythrolamprus
- Species: E. melanotus

Binomial name
- Erythrolamprus melanotus (Shaw, 1802)

Subspecies
- L. m. melanotus (Shaw, 1802); L. m. lamari Dixon & Michaud, 1992; L. m. nesos Dixon & Michaud, 1992

Synonyms
- Coluber melanotus Shaw, 1802; Liophis melanotus (Shaw, 1802); Dromicus melanotus (Shaw, 1802); Leimadophis melanotus (Shaw, 1802); Lemiadophis [sic] melanotus (Shaw, 1802); Coluber (Natrix) raninus Merrem, 1820; Coluber vittatus Hallowell, 1845; Liophis melanonotus Cope, 1860 (missp.); Aporophis crucifer Ahl, 1925

Species of snake

Shaw's dark ground snake (Erythrolamprus melanotus), also known commonly as Shaw's black-backed snake, and in Spanish as candelilla, guarda caminos, and reinita cazadora, is a species of snake in the subfamily Dipsadinae of the family Colubridae. The species is native to northern South America.

== Etymology ==
The English common names for Erythrolamprus melanotus refer to English biologist George Kearsley Shaw, who described and named this snake as a species new to science in 1802.

== Classification ==
Erythrolamprus melanotus belongs to the genus Erythrolamprus, which contains over 50 species. The genus Erythrolamprus belongs to the subfamily Dipsadinae, which is sometimes referred to as the family Dipsadidae. The relationships of Erythrolamprus species located in northern South America (Venezuela) can be shown in the cladogram below, based on molecular DNA analysis:

- - E. poecilogyrus (paraphyletic)
  - - E. ceii
    - E. poecilogyrus (paraphyletic)
- - E. miliaris
  - E. miliaris
  - - - E. typhlus (Brazil) (paraphyletic)
      - - E. reginae (paraphyletic)
        - - E. reginae (paraphyletic)
          - E. zweifeli
    - - E. breviceps
      - E. epinephalus (Peru) (paraphyletic)
      - - - E. epinephalus (Costa Rica) (paraphyletic)
          - E. pseudoreginae
        - Erythrolamprus melanotus
  - - - E. atraventer
      - - E. jaegeri
        - E. almadensis
    - - - E. juliae
        - E. cursor
      - E. typhlus (French Guiana) (paraphyletic)
    - - E. cobella
      - - - E. aesculapii (Brazil) (paraphyletic)
          - E. ocellatus
        - - E. aesculapii (French Guiana & Guyana) (paraphyletic)
          - - E. bizona
            - E. mimus

== Description ==
Erythrolamprus melanotus grows to a total length (tail included) of 43 cm (17 in).

Dorsally, it has a light yellow or pinkish color, with a wide, dark vertebral stripe, which is bordered on each side by a thin whitish stripe, followed by a thin dark stripe. The top of the head is olive, and there is a dark stripe passing through the eye. The upper labials and the venter (underside) of the snake are whitish.

The dorsal scales are smooth, with apical pits, and are arranged in 17 rows at midbody.

== Behavior and diet ==
Erythrolamprus melanotus is diurnal, hunting during the day along the forest floor, where it feeds on spectacled lizards in the genus Bachia, the rain frog Pristimantis urichi, the puddle frog Engystomops pustulosus, the gecko Gonatodes vittatus, and various unidentified fish.

== Reproduction ==
Erythrolamprus melanotus is oviparous.

== Geographic range ==
The geographic distribution of Erythrolamprus melanotus includes Colombia, Venezuela, and Trinidad and Tobago. It is probably extirpated from Grenada.

== Habitat ==
The preferred natural habitats of Erythrolamprus melanotus are freshwater wetlands, forest, and savanna, at altitudes up to 2,000 m (6,600 ft).
