= Serra dos Reis A State Park =

State park in Rondônia, Brazil

- Parque Estadual Serra dos Reis A
- IUCN category II (national park)
- Location within Brazil
- Nearest city: São Francisco do Guaporé, Rondônia
- Coordinates: 12.179961°S 63.953235°W
- Area: 2,244 hectares (5,550 acres)
- Designation: State park
- Created: 7 November 1996
- Administrator: Secretaria de Estado do Desenvolvimento Ambiental

The Serra dos Reis A State Park (Portuguese: Parque Estadual Serra dos Reis A) is a state park in the state of Rondônia, Brazil.

== Location ==
The Serra dos Reis A State Park is divided between the municipalities of Costa Marques (14.17%) and São Francisco do Guaporé (85.83%) in Rondônia. It has an area of 2,244 hectares (5,550 acres). It adjoins the Serra dos Reis State Park along its southern boundary. The park is to the south of the BR-429 highway, east of the town of Costa Marques and north of the Guaporé River, which defines the border with Bolivia.

== History ==
The Serra dos Reis A State Park was created by decree 7.637 of 7 November 1996 with an area of about 2,243.85 hectares (5,544.7 acres) in the municipality of Costa Marques. (Note: The district of São Francisco do Guaporé, part of the municipality of Costa Marques, became a separate municipality by state law 644 of 27 December 1995. Its limits were altered by state law 771 of 7 April 1998. São Francisco do Guaporé now holds the bulk of the park.) The park was bounded by the Serra dos Reis State Park, created by decree 7.027 of 8 August 1995. The State Department of Environmental Development (SEDAM) was made responsible for administration.

== Sources ==
- PES Serra dos Reis (in Portuguese), ISA: Instituto Socioambiental
- PES Serra dos Reis A (in Portuguese), ISA: Instituto Socioambiental
- Raupp de Matos, Valdir; Almeida, José de, Júnior (7 November 1996), Decreto nº 7.637, de 07 de Novembro de 1996 (in Portuguese)
- São Francisco do Guaporé » histórico (in Portuguese), IBGE: Instituto Brasileiro de Geografia e Estatística
