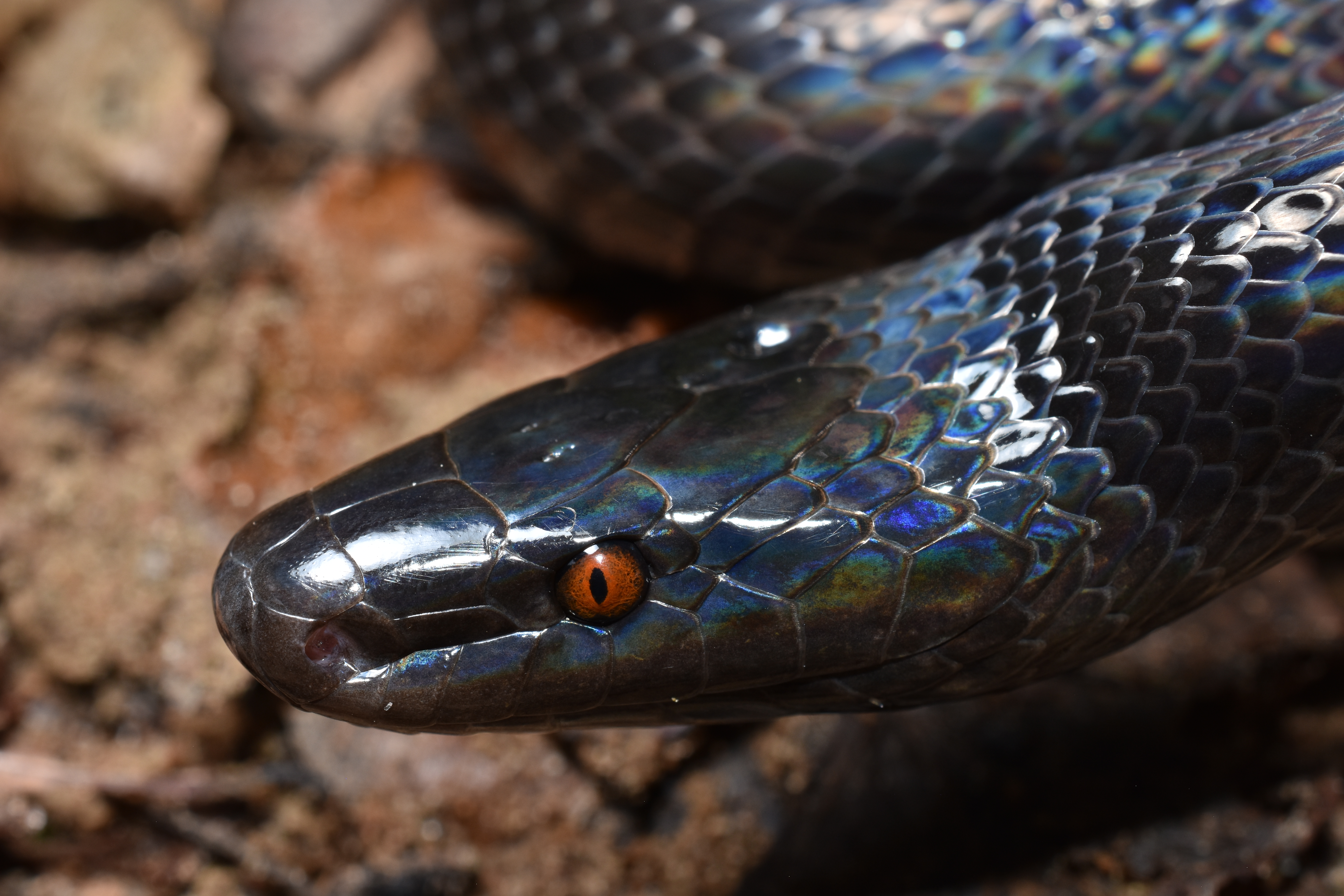
- adult from Florida Province, Bolivia

Scientific classification
- Kingdom: Animalia
- Phylum: Chordata
- Class: Reptilia
- Order: Squamata
- Suborder: Serpentes
- Family: Colubridae
- Genus: Oxyrhopus
- Species: O. emberti

Binomial name
- Oxyrhopus emberti Gonzales, Reichle, & Entiauspe-Neto, 2020

= Oxyrhopus emberti =

Species of snake

Oxyrhopus emberti is a species of snake in the family Colubridae. The species is endemic to Bolivia.
