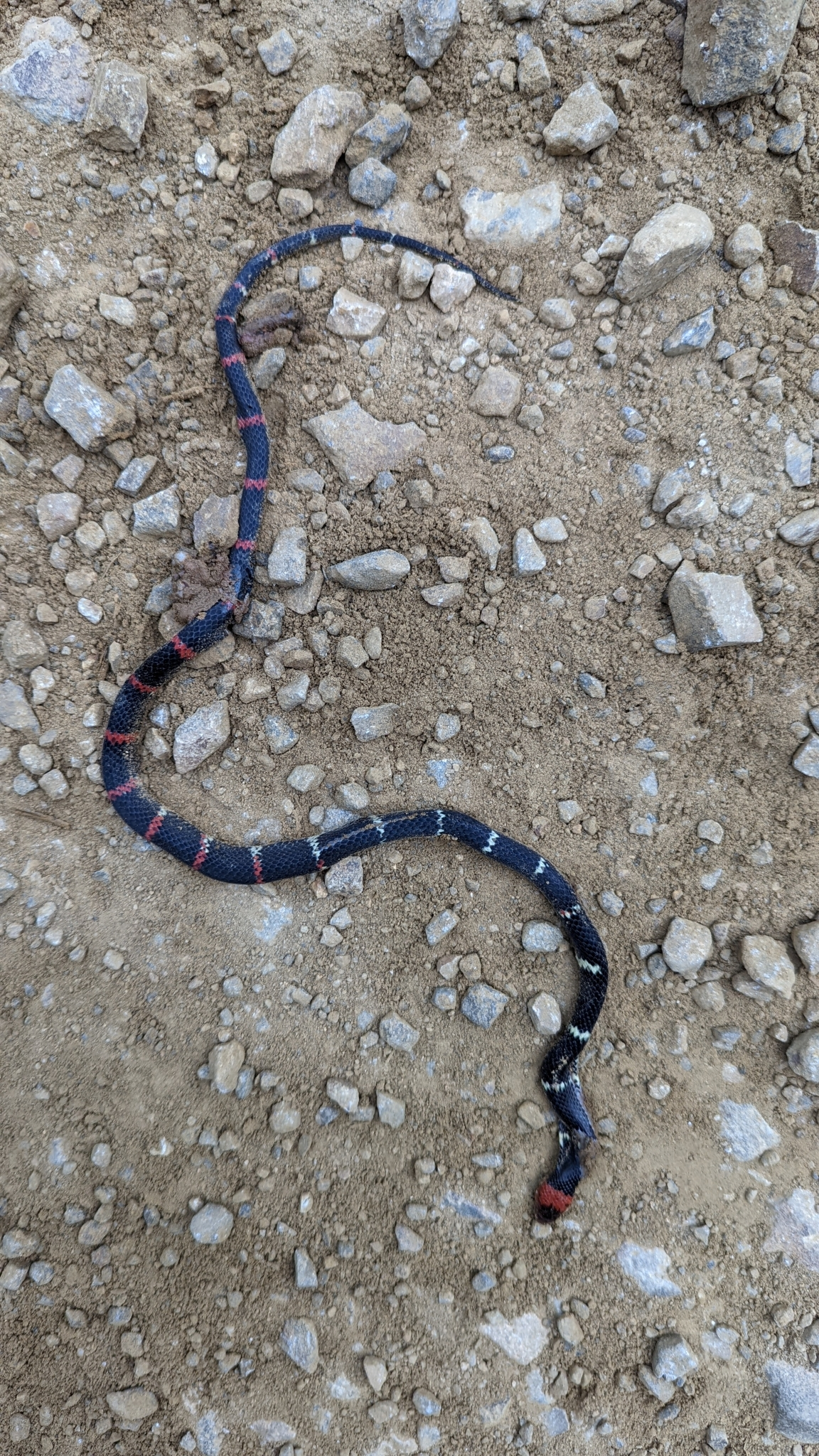

Conservation status
- Least Concern (IUCN 3.1)

Scientific classification
- Kingdom: Animalia
- Phylum: Chordata
- Class: Reptilia
- Order: Squamata
- Suborder: Serpentes
- Family: Colubridae
- Genus: Oxyrhopus
- Species: O. erdisii

Binomial name
- Oxyrhopus erdisii (Barbour, 1913)

= Oxyrhopus erdisii =

Species of snake

Oxyrhopus erdisii is a species of snake in the family Colubridae. The species is endemic to Peru.
