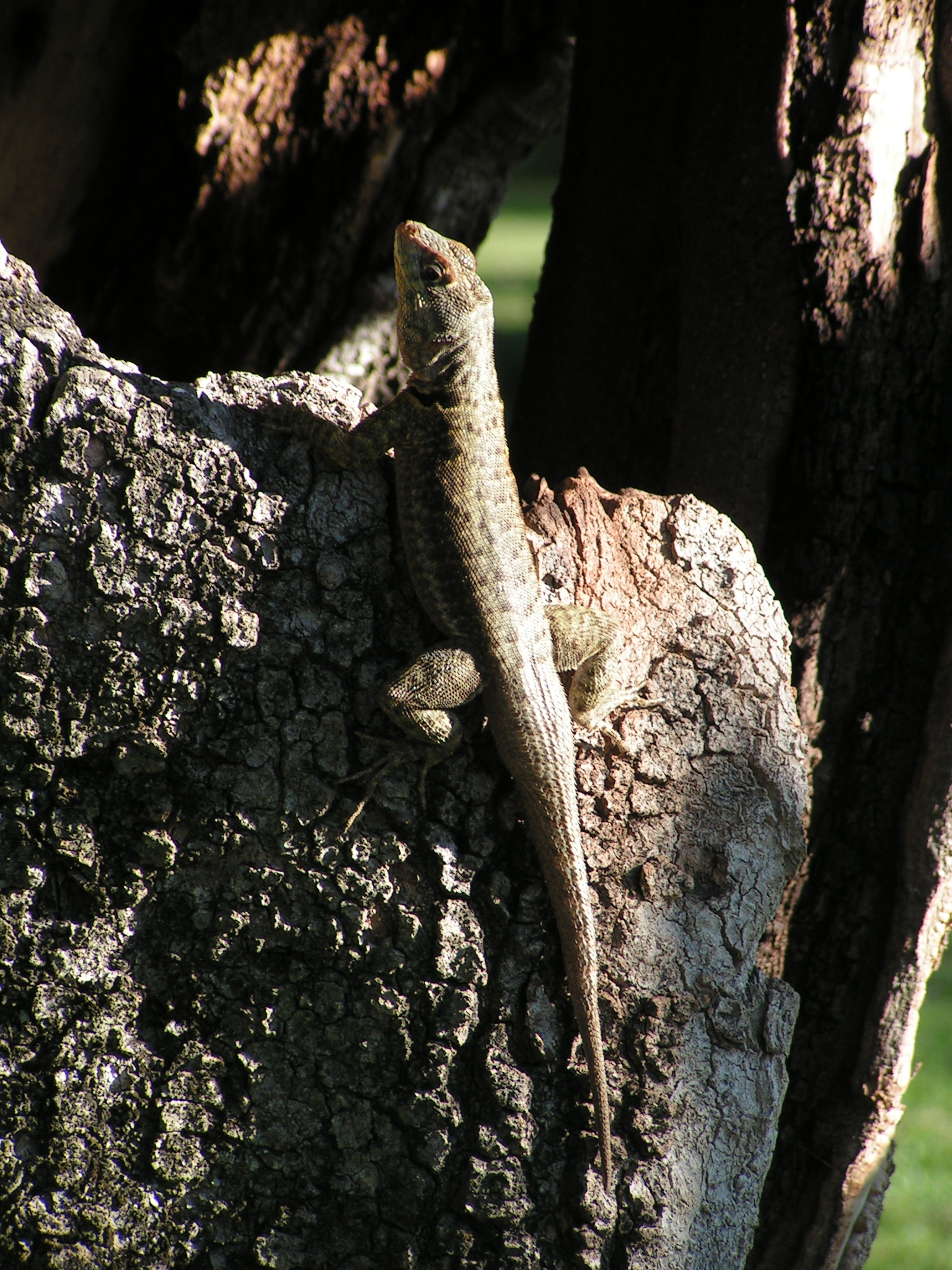

Conservation status
- Least Concern (IUCN 3.1)

Scientific classification
- Kingdom: Animalia
- Phylum: Chordata
- Class: Reptilia
- Order: Squamata
- Suborder: Iguania
- Family: Liolaemidae
- Genus: Liolaemus
- Species: L. fitzingerii

Binomial name
- Liolaemus fitzingerii (A.M.C. Duméril & Bibron, 1837)

Synonyms
- Proctotretus fitzingerii A.M.C. Duméril & Bibron, 1837; Eulaemus affinis Girard, 1858; Liolaemus fitzingeri — Boulenger, 1885; Liolaemus melanops Burmeister, 1888; Liolaemus camarones Abdala, Díaz-Gómez & Juarez-Heredia, 2012; Liolaemus fitzingerii — Grummer et al., 2018

= Liolaemus fitzingerii =

Species of lizard

Liolaemus fitzingerii, commonly known as Fitzinger's tree iguana, is a species of lizard in the family Liolaemidae. It is native to extreme southern South America.

== Etymology ==
The specific name, fitzingerii, is in honor of Austrian herpetologist Leopold Fitzinger.

== Geographic range ==
L. fitzingerii is found in Argentina (Chubut Province, Santa Cruz Province) and Chile (Aysén Region).

== Habitat ==
The preferred natural habitats of L. fitzingerii are shrubland and grassland, at altitudes from sea level to 1,100 m (3,600 ft).

== Diet ==
L. fitzingerii preys predominately on insects.

== Reproduction ==
L. fitzingerii is oviparous.
