= Costa Marques =

Municipality in Rondônia, Brazil

- Municipality
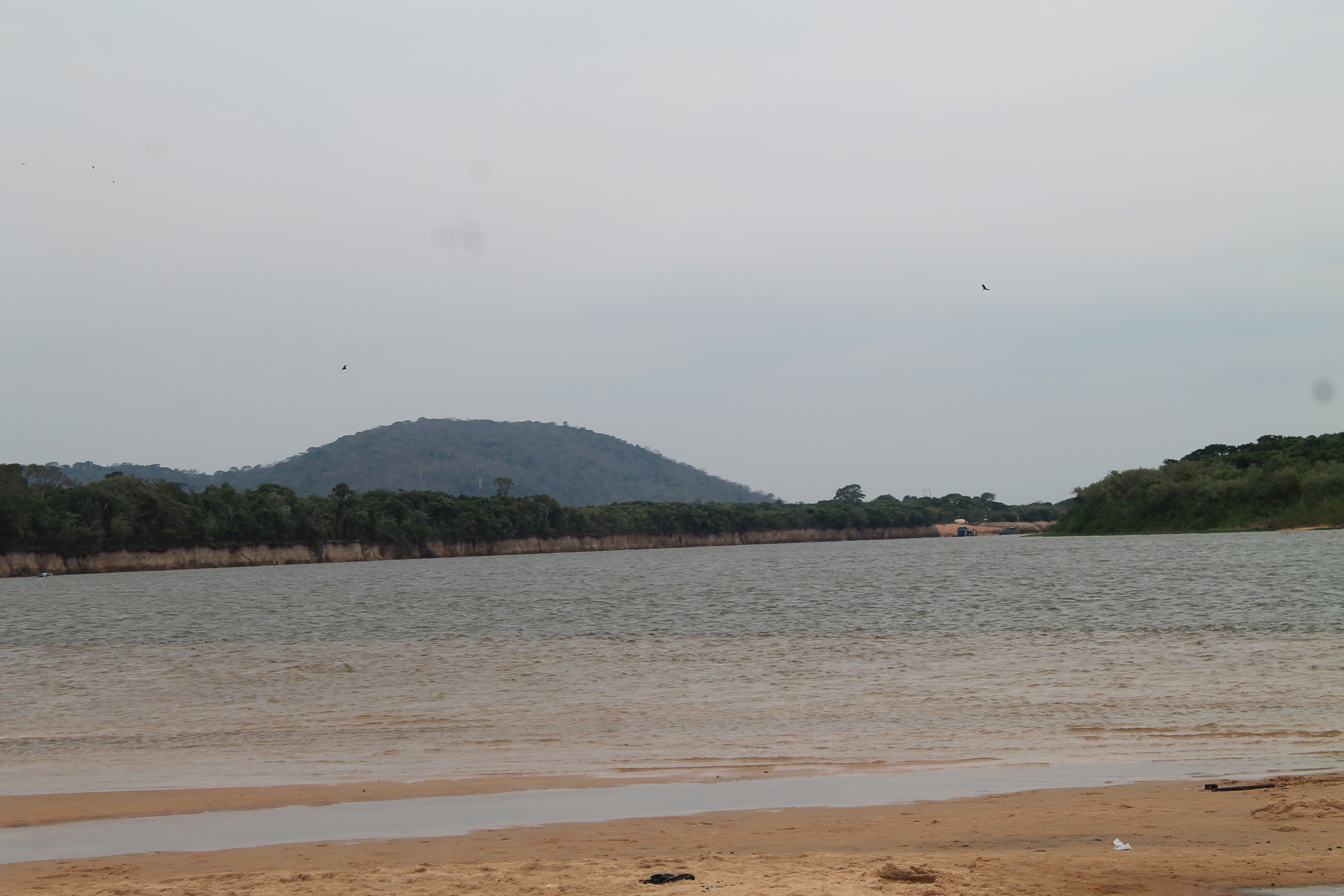

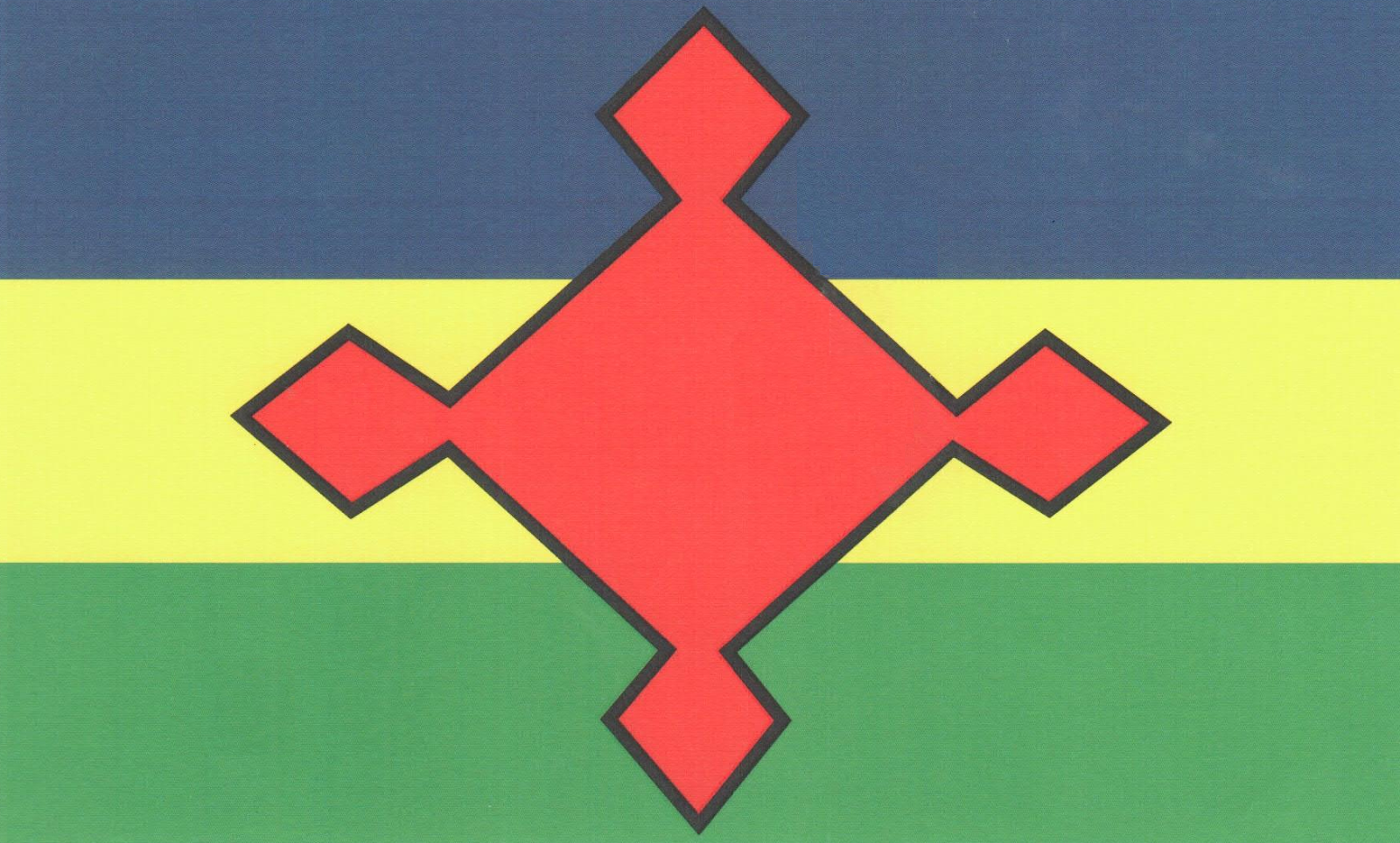
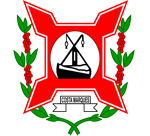
- Flag Coat of arms

- Location in Rondônia state

- Location in Brazil
- Coordinates: 12°26′42″S 64°13′38″W
- Country: Brazil
- Region: North
- State: Rondônia

Area
  - Total: 4,987 km^{2} (1,925 sq mi)

Population (2020)
  - Total: 18,798
  - Density: 3.769/km^{2} (9.763/sq mi)
- Time zone: UTC−4 (AMT)

Costa Marques is a municipality located in the Brazilian state of Rondônia. Its population was 18,798 (2020) and its area is 4,987 km^{2}.

The city is located in the Guaporé River's right bank and the main attraction is Forte Príncipe da Beira (named after the Prince of Beira), which was built in 1786 by the Portuguese Kingdom to protect that region from the Spanish Crown.

The municipality contains 91% of the 36,442-hectare (90,050-acre) Serra dos Reis State Park. It contains 14% of the 2,244-hectare (5,550-acre) Serra dos Reis A State Park, created in 1996. It also contains 52.5% of the 146,400-hectare (362,000-acre) Rio Cautário State Extractive Reserve, created in 1995.

== See also ==
- List of municipalities in Rondônia
