= Leopold Fitzinger =

Austrian zoologist (1802–1884)

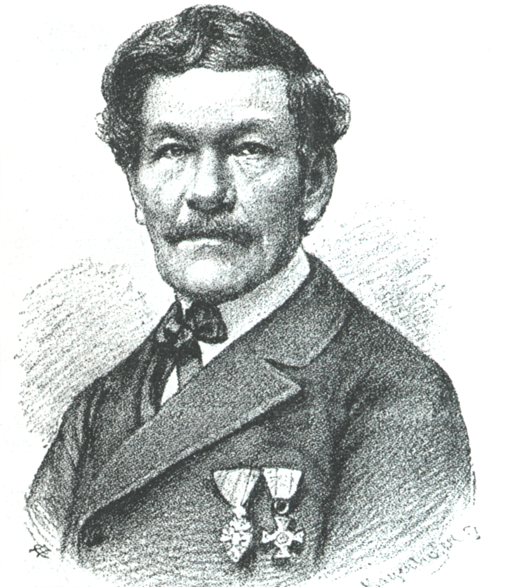
- Born: 13 April 1802; Vienna, Austrian Empire
- Died: 20 September 1884 (aged 82); Hietzing, Austria-Hungary
- Education: University of Vienna
- Known for: Neue Classification der Reptilien, Systema Reptilium
- Scientific career
- Fields: Zoology
- Workplaces: Natural History Museum, Vienna
- Author abbrev. (zoology): Fitzinger

Leopold Joseph Franz Johann Fitzinger (13 April 1802 – 20 September 1884) was an Austrian zoologist.

== Life ==
Fitzinger was born in Vienna and studied botany at the University of Vienna under Nikolaus Joseph von Jacquin. He worked at the Vienna Naturhistorisches Museum between 1817, when he joined as a volunteer assistant, and 1821, when he left to become secretary to the provincial legislature of Lower Austria; after a hiatus, he was appointed assistant curator in 1844 and remained at the Naturhistorisches Museum until 1861. Later, he became director of the zoos of Munich and Budapest.

In 1826, he published Neue Classification der Reptilien, based partly on the work of his friends Friedrich Wilhelm Hemprich and Heinrich Boie. In 1843, he published Systema Reptilium, covering geckos, chameleons and iguanas.

Fitzinger is commemorated in the scientific names of five reptiles: Algyroides fitzingeri, Leptotyphlops fitzingeri, Liolaemus fitzingerii, Micrurus tener fitzingeri, and Oxyrhopus fitzingeri.

Works

- Fitzinger LJFJ (1826). Neue Classification der Reptilien nach ihren natürlichen Verwandtschaften. Nebst einer Verwandtschafts-tafel und einem Verzeichnisse der Reptilien-Sammlung des K. K. zoologischen Museum's zu Wien (New classification of reptiles according to their natural relationships, appended to a table of their relationships and a sketch of the reptile collection of the imperial and royal zoological museum of Vienna). Vienna: J.G. Hübner. vii + 66 pp. + one plate. (in German and Latin).
- Fitzinger LJFJ (1835). Entwurf einer systematischen Anordnung der Schildkröten nach den Grundsätzen der natürlichen Methode (Draft of a systematic arrangement of turtles based on the principles of the natural method).
- Fitzinger LJFJ (1843). Systema Reptilium, Fasciculus Primus, Amblyglossae. Vienna: Braumüller et Seidel. 106 pp. + indices (in Latin).
- Fitzinger LJFJ (1850). Über den Proteus anguinus der Autoren (On the author's Proteus anguinus).
- Fitzinger LJFJ (1861). A catalog of the reptiles and amphibians collected during the Novara expedition.

== See also ==
- Category:Taxa named by Leopold Fitzinger
