= Oxyrhopus fitzingeri =

Conservation status
- Least Concern (IUCN 3.1)

Scientific classification
- Kingdom: Animalia
- Phylum: Chordata
- Class: Reptilia
- Order: Squamata
- Suborder: Serpentes
- Family: Colubridae
- Genus: Oxyrhopus
- Species: O. fitzingeri

Binomial name
- Oxyrhopus fitzingeri (Tschudi, 1845)

Synonyms
- Siphlophis fitzingeri Tschudi, 1845; Oxyrhopus fitzingeri — Jan, 1863; Clelia fitzingeri — Dunn, 1923; Pseudoboa fitzingeri — Amaral, 1925; Oxyrhopus fitzingeri — Schmidt & Walker, 1943

Species of snake

Oxyrhopus fitzingeri, also known commonly as Fitzinger's false coral snake, is a species of snake in the family Colubridae. The species is native to northwestern South America. There are two recognized subspecies.

== Etymology ==
The specific name, fitzingeri, is in honor of Austrian herpetologist Leopold Fitzinger.

The subspecific name, frizzelli, is honor of the collectors of the holotype, Don L. Frizzell & Harriet E. Frizzell.

== Geographic range ==
O. fitzingeri is found in Ecuador and Peru.

== Habitat ==
The preferred natural habitats of O. fitzingeri are forest, savanna, and desert, at altitudes from sea level to 1,829 m (6,001 ft).

== Reproduction ==
O. fitzingeri is oviparous.

== Subspecies ==
Two subspecies are recognized as being valid, including the nominotypical subspecies.

- Oxyrhopus fitzingeri fitzingeri (Tschudi, 1845)
- Oxyrhopus fitzingeri frizzelli Schmidt & Walker, 1943

Nota bene: A trinomial authority in parentheses indicates that the subspecies was originally described in a genus other than Oxyrhopus.
