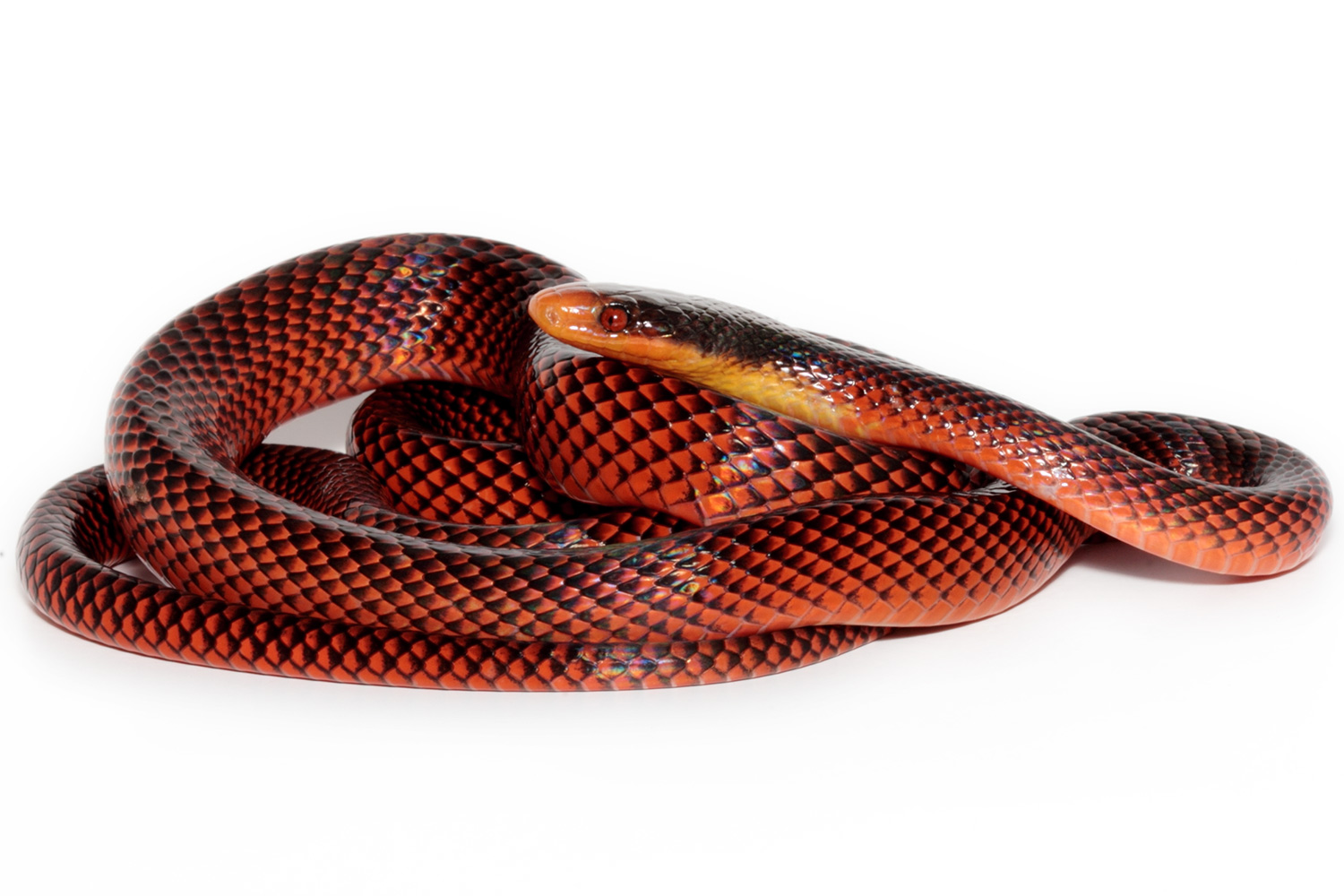
- Oxyrhopus occipitalis

Conservation status
- Least Concern (IUCN 3.1)

Scientific classification
- Kingdom: Animalia
- Phylum: Chordata
- Class: Reptilia
- Order: Squamata
- Suborder: Serpentes
- Family: Colubridae
- Genus: Oxyrhopus
- Species: O. occipitalis

Binomial name
- Oxyrhopus occipitalis (Wied-Neuwied in Spix, 1824)

= Oxyrhopus occipitalis =

Species of snake

Oxyrhopus occipitalis is a neotropical snake of the family Dipsadidae. It occurs in Brazil, Guyana, Suriname, French Guiana, and Venezuela. It is often confused with Oxyrhopus formosus, a Brazilian species. Oxyrhopus occipitalis is more slender, the snout is yellow and the top of the head is brown, adults are red with very faint darker bands; O. formosus is more robust, the head is entirely yellow, and adults have obvious transverse dark bands
