= Serra dos Reis State Park =

State park in Rondônia, Brazil

- Parque Estadual Serra dos Reis
- IUCN category II (national park)
- Location within Brazil
- Coordinates: 12°15′49″S 63°57′40″W
- Area: 36,442 hectares (90,050 acres)
- Designation: State park
- Created: 8 August 1995
- Administrator: Secretaria de Estado do Desenvolvimento Ambiental, RO

The Serra dos Reis State Park (Portuguese: Parque Estadual Serra dos Reis) is a state park in the state of Rondônia, Brazil.

== Location ==
The Serra dos Reis State Park is divided between the municipalities of Costa Marques (91.17%) and São Francisco do Guaporé (8.83%) in Rondônia. It has an area of 36,442 hectares (90,050 acres). It is bordered to the north by the Serra dos Reis A State Park. It lies to the south and east of the BR-429 highway, and to the north of the Guaporé River, which defines the border with Bolivia. The park is in the central-west Brazilian pediplain and the Parecis plateau. Altitudes are from 100 to 400 metres (330 to 1,310 ft). The park has two support bases for researchers and inspection teams.

== History ==
The Serra dos Reis State Park was created by decree 7.027 of 8 August 1995. Law 764 of 29 December 1997 defined the limits of the park with an area of 36,442 hectares (90,050 acres). The consultative council was created on 16 June 2002. On 22 January 2013 the governor decreed the creation of the park with an area of about 42,286.9376 hectares (104,493.298 acres) in the municipality of Costa Marques, under the Secretariat of State for Environmental Development (SEDAM).

In February 2016 it was announced that the federal Ministry of the Environment would include the Serra dos Reis State Park, the Samuel Ecological Station and the Rio Pacaás Novos Extractive Reserve, all in Rondônia, among the conservation areas supported under the Amazon Region Protected Areas Program (ARPA).

== Environment ==
The park is covered by open rainforest. The flat areas are dominated by open rainforest with many palm trees. There are areas of denser forest, wetlands that are periodically flooded and terra firma fields higher up. Biodiversity is low compared to other Amazon areas. 152 species of birds have been identified and 24 species of mammals.

In January 2011 the Rondônia Public Ministry said it would investigate the illegal removal of 517 cubic metres (18,300 cu ft) of logs, or about 17 truckloads, from the area around the state park. It would look into possible administrative misconduct by SEDAM in the matter. In January 2016 SEDAM announced findings of illegal activity in the previous quarter in nine units that benefited from ARPA in the state. In the Rio Cautário State Extractive Reserve and the Serra dos Reis State Park they had seized a motorcycle, a tractor and six trucks loaded with 695 cubic metres (24,500 cu ft) of logs and 105 cubic metres (3,700 cu ft) of sawed timber, 930 wooden stakes and various camping and fishing items.

== Sources ==
- Juliane Bandeira (7 January 2011), "MP apura retirada do equivalente a 17 caminhões carregados de madeira de área protegida", Rondônia Digital (in Portuguese)
- Parque Estadual Serra dos Reis (in Portuguese), SEDAM: Secretaria de Estado do Desenvolvimento Ambiental
- Parque Estadual Serra dos Reis (in Portuguese), Via Rural, archived from the original on July 10, 2009
- PES Serra dos Reis (in Portuguese), ISA: Instituto Socioambiental
- "Sedam divulga resultado de fiscalização de unidades de conservação de Rondônia", Rondoniagora (in Portuguese), 6 January 2016
- "Três Unidades de Conservação de Rondônia são inseridas no programa Áreas Protegidas", Jornal O Nortão (in Portuguese), 24 February 2016, archived from the original on 2016-08-21
