= Oxyrhopus marcapatae =

Conservation status
- Least Concern (IUCN 3.1)

Scientific classification
- Kingdom: Animalia
- Phylum: Chordata
- Class: Reptilia
- Order: Squamata
- Suborder: Serpentes
- Family: Colubridae
- Genus: Oxyrhopus
- Species: O. marcapatae

Binomial name
- Oxyrhopus marcapatae (Boulenger, 1902)

Species of snake

Oxyrhopus marcapatae, Boulenger's false coral snake, is a species of snake in the family Colubridae. The species is native to Peru.
