= Oxyrhopus leucomelas =

Conservation status
- Least Concern (IUCN 3.1)

Scientific classification
- Kingdom: Animalia
- Phylum: Chordata
- Class: Reptilia
- Order: Squamata
- Suborder: Serpentes
- Family: Colubridae
- Genus: Oxyrhopus
- Species: O. leucomelas

Binomial name
- Oxyrhopus leucomelas (Werner, 1916)

Species of snake

Oxyrhopus leucomelas, Werner's false coral snake, is a species of snake in the family Colubridae. The species is native to Ecuador, Colombia, Venezuela, and Peru.
