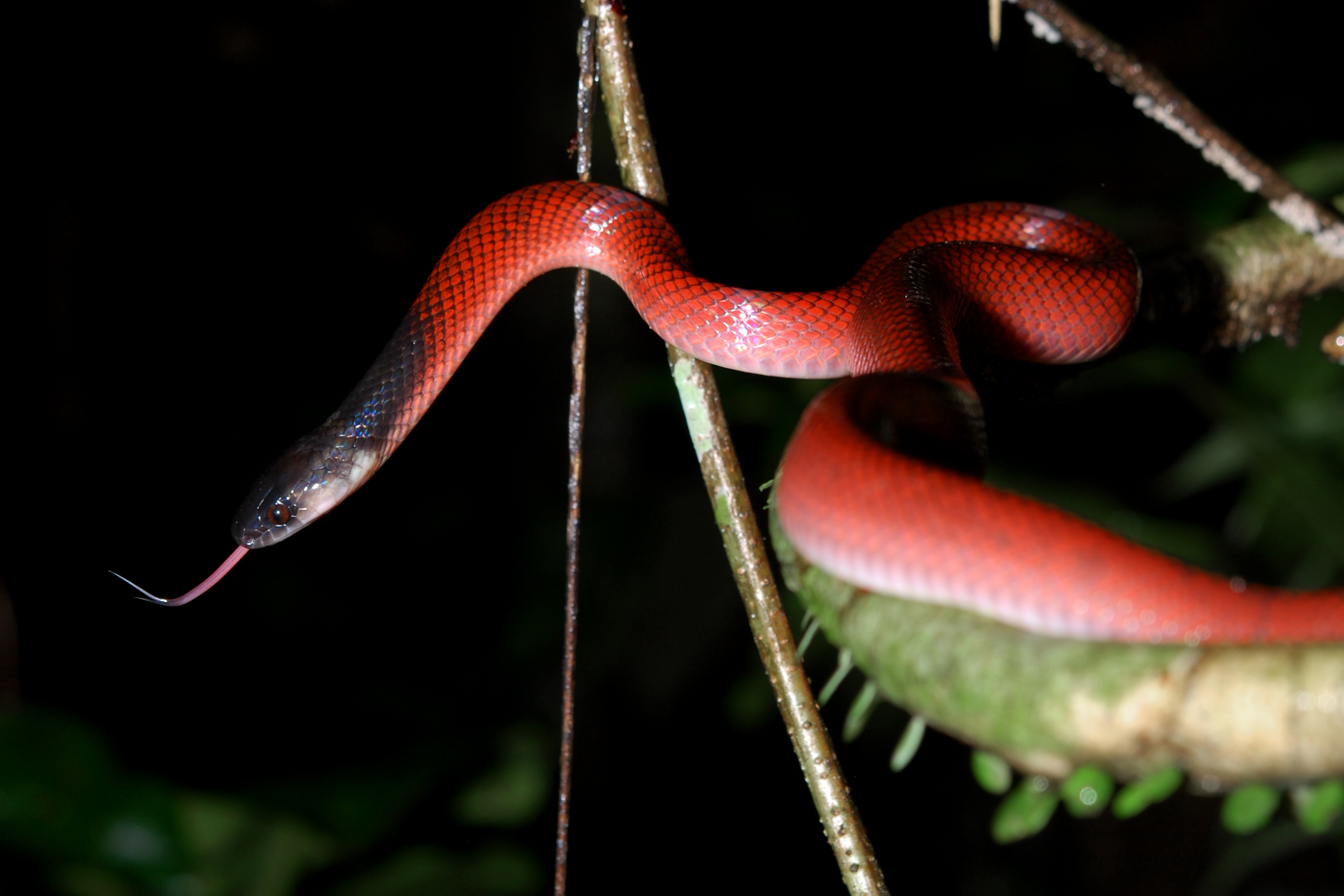

Conservation status
- Least Concern (IUCN 3.1)

Scientific classification
- Kingdom: Animalia
- Phylum: Chordata
- Class: Reptilia
- Order: Squamata
- Suborder: Serpentes
- Family: Colubridae
- Genus: Oxyrhopus
- Species: O. melanogenys

Binomial name
- Oxyrhopus melanogenys (Tschudi, 1845)

Synonyms
- Sphenocephalus melanogenys Tschudi, 1845; Oxyrhopus tergeminus — Jan, 1870; Tachymenis bitorquata Günther, 1872; Oxyrhopus melanogenys — Boulenger, 1896

= Oxyrhopus melanogenys =

Species of snake

Oxyrhopus melanogenys, commonly known as Tschudi's false coral snake, is a colubrid snake species found in the northern part of South America.

== Description ==
Adults may attain a total length of 68 cm (27 in), which includes a tail 17 cm (6.7 in) long.

Dorsally, it is red or reddish brown, with the dorsal scales black-edged or black-tipped. There may be a few black crossbands in groups of three (triads) on the anterior portion of the body. The top of the head and the nape of the neck are black. Ventrally, it is yellowish. It is often confused with Oxyrhopus trigeminus.

The dorsal scales are smooth, with apical pits, and are arranged in 19 rows at midbody.

== Subspecies ==
There are two subspecies, including the nominate subspecies:

- Oxyrhopus melanogenys melanogenys (Tschudi, 1845)
- Oxyrhopus melanogenys orientalis Cunha & Nascimento, 1983

== Geographic range ==
O. m. melanogenys is native to Bolivia, Peru, Brazil (Rondônia, Amazonas, Pará), Ecuador, Colombia, Guyana, Venezuela (Amazonas, Bolívar).

O. m. orientalis is found in Peru and Brazil (Pará).
