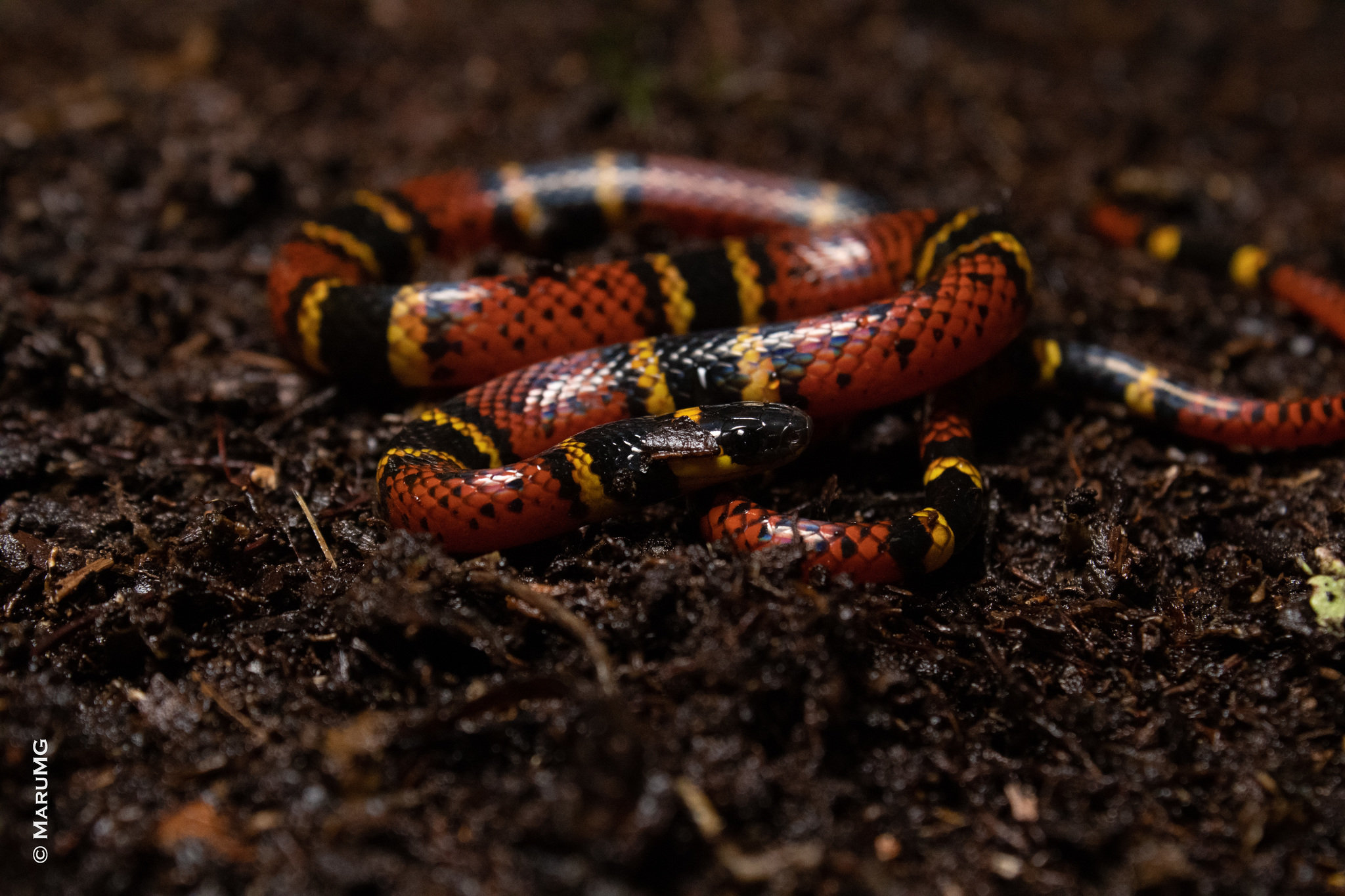

Conservation status
- Least Concern (IUCN 3.1)

Scientific classification
- Kingdom: Animalia
- Phylum: Chordata
- Class: Reptilia
- Order: Squamata
- Suborder: Serpentes
- Family: Colubridae
- Genus: Pliocercus
- Species: P. elapoides

Binomial name
- Pliocercus elapoides Cope, 1860

Synonyms
- Pliocercus elapoides Cope, 1860; Liophis elapoides — Garman, 1884; Urotheca elapoides — Boulenger, 1894; Pliocercus elapoides — H.M. Smith, 1943; Pliocercus elapoides — Wallach, K. Williams & Boundy, 2014

= Pliocercus elapoides =

Species of snake

Pliocercus elapoides, also known commonly as the variegated false coral snake, is a species of snake in the family Colubridae. The species is native to southern North America and northern Central America. There are four recognized subspecies.

== Geographic range ==
P. elapoides is found in Belize, El Salvador, Guatemala, Honduras, and southeastern Mexico.

== Habitat ==
The preferred natural habitat of P. elapoides is forest.

== Description ==
Resembling a venomous coral snake, P. elapoides has a dorsal color pattern of red, black, and yellow rings. The red scales are tipped with black.

== Behavior ==
P. elapoides is nocturnal, terrestrial and semi-fossorial.

== Reproduction ==
P. elapoides is oviparous.

== Subspecies ==
Four subspecies are recognized as being valid, including the nominotypical subspecies.

- Pliocercus elapoides aequalis Salvin, 1861
- Pliocercus elapoides diastema (Bocourt, 1886)
- Pliocercus elapoides elapoides Cope, 1860
- Pliocercus elapoides occidentalis H.M. Smith & Landy, 1965

Nota bene: A trinomial authority in parentheses indicates that the subspecies was originally described in a genus other than Pliocercus.
