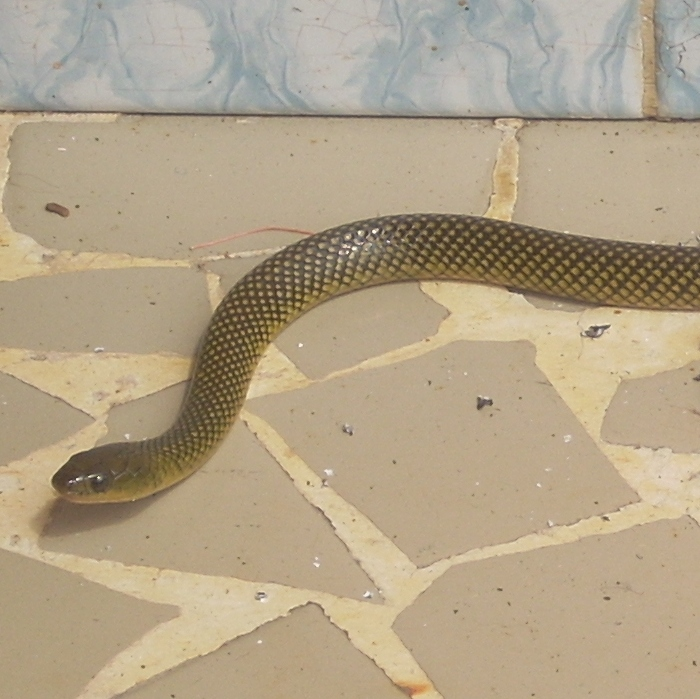
- Erythrolamprus miliaris

Conservation status
- Least Concern (IUCN 3.1)

Scientific classification
- Kingdom: Animalia
- Phylum: Chordata
- Class: Reptilia
- Order: Squamata
- Suborder: Serpentes
- Family: Colubridae
- Subfamily: Dipsadinae
- Genus: Erythrolamprus
- Species: E. miliaris

Binomial name
- Erythrolamprus miliaris (Linnaeus, 1758)

Synonyms
- Coluber miliaris Linnaeus, 1758; Liophis miliaris (Linnaeus, 1758); Coluber merremii Wied, 1821; Ablabes purpurans A.M.C. Duméril, Bibron & A.H.A. Duméril, 1854; Liophis cobella var. collaris Jan, 1863; Coronella orientalis Günther, 1864; Rhadinaea chrysostoma Cope, 1868; Coronella poecilolaemus Günther, 1872; Rhadinaea orina Griffin, 1916; Dromicus amazonicus Dunn, 1922

= Military ground snake =

Species of snake

The military ground snake (Erythrolamprus miliaris) is a species of snake in the subfamily Dipsadinae of the family Colubridae. The species is endemic to South America.

== Common names ==
South American common names for Erythrolamprus miliaris include cobra-d'água (water snake) and cobra-lisa (smooth snake) in Portuguese, and simply culebra (snake) in Spanish.

== Taxonomy ==
Erythrolamprus miliaris was originally described as Coluber miliaris by Carl Linnaeus in 1758.

Erythrolamprus miliaris belongs to the genus Erythrolamprus, which contains over 50 species. The genus Erythrolamprus belongs to the subfamily Dipsadinae, which is sometimes referred to as the family Dipsadidae. The relationships of Erythrolamprus species located in northern South America can be shown in the cladogram below, based on molecular DNA analysis:

- - E. poecilogyrus (paraphyletic)
  - - E. ceii
    - E. poecilogyrus (paraphyletic)
- - Erythrolamprus miliaris
  - Erythrolamprus miliaris
  - - - E. typhlus (Brazil) (paraphyletic)
      - - E. reginae (paraphyletic)
        - - E. reginae (paraphyletic)
          - E. zweifeli
    - - E. breviceps
      - E. epinephalus (Peru) (paraphyletic)
      - - - E. epinephalus (Costa Rica) (paraphyletic)
          - E. pseudoreginae
        - E. melanotus
  - - - E. atraventer
      - - E. jaegeri
        - E. almadensis
    - - - E. juliae
        - E. cursor
      - E. typhlus (French Guiana) (paraphyletic)
    - - E. cobella
      - - - E. aesculapii (Brazil) (paraphyletic)
          - E. ocellatus
        - - E. aesculapii (French Guiana & Guyana) (paraphyletic)
          - - E. bizona
            - E. mimus

=== Subspecies ===
Five subspecies are recognized, including the nominotypical subspecies.

- Erythrolamprus miliaris amazonicus (Dunn, 1922)
- Erythrolamprus miliaris chrysostomus (Cope, 1868)
- Erythrolamprus miliaris merremi (Wied, 1821)
- Erythrolamprus miliaris miliaris (Linnaeus, 1758)
- Erythrolamprus miliaris orinus (Griffin, 1916)

== Etymology ==
The subspecific name, merremi is in honor of German herpetologist Blasius Merrem.

=== Liophis milaris intermedius, a taxonomic error ===
In 1991, Erythrolamprus miliaris intermedius was described by Henle and Ehrl. However, they made a mistake. It was later discovered by Dixon and Tipton, through various comparisons of morphometrics, that Erythrolamprus miliaris intermedius was actually Erythrolamprus reginae.

== Geographic range ==
Erythrolamprus miliaris is found in South America east of the Andes, from the Guyanas south to Paraguay. The former subspecies extending further south (southeastern Brazil, Paraguay, Uruguay and northeastern Argentina) is now recognized as a full species, Erythrolamprus semiaureus.

== Habitat ==
Erythrolamprus miliaris inhabits aquatic and riparian habitats. It occurs in both lowland tropical rainforest and Atlantic forest at elevations below 100–700 m (330–2,300 ft).

== Physical characteristics ==
Erythrolamprus miliaris is stout-bodied (muscular) and relatively short-tailed. Tail length/total length ratios vary from 15.0%–19.8% with an average of 18.6%.

Adults may attain a total length (tail included) of about 50 cm (about 20 in).

Dorsally, it is pale olive-brown or yellowish, with each smooth dorsal scale edged with black. Ventrally, it is uniformly yellow.

== Feeding ==
Erythrolamprus miliaris feeds on a wide range of prey items. They include primarily amphibians (including eggs and tadpoles), but also fish and even lizards and small rodents. Invertebrates have also been reported but may have been secondarily ingested. However, there is little information on its feeding habits. A study indicated that females with oviductal eggs did not feed, whereas those females with secondary vitellogenic follicles fed more often than did the non-reproductive ones.

== Sexual dimorphism ==
There is sexual dimorphism with respect to size of adult Erythrolamprus miliaris. Adult females are larger in the subspecies merremi and orinus. They were seen to be larger than the adult males. The sexual dimorphism index was seen to be similar in the geographic areas of the northern coastal Atlantic forest, southern coastal Atlantic forest, northern inland Atlantic forest and southern inland Atlantic forest. This was indicative of no geographic variation in sexual size dimorphism. It is believed that body size may differ either because of local genetic modification or direct phenotypic effect of food availability on the growth rates. In addition to body size, the comparison of head size in E. miliaris is seen to show no dimorphism. Head size is considered to be associated with inter-sexual dietary divergence.

== Reproductive output ==
With respect to reproductive output in the northern and southern coast Atlantic forest, and the northern and southern inland forest, the reproductive output recorded for Erythrolamprus miliaris orinus and Erythrolamprus miliaris merremi were determined via number of eggs, size of eggs, and number of neonates. The mean egg volume in the southern coast Atlantic forest was seen to be the largest of the four regions. The reproductive frequency was lower in the northern coast Atlantic forest than the other regions.

== Parasitism ==
Parasitism is not understood very well in the context of snake ecology. The only inferences that have been made are those with the influence on natural populations. It is thought to be related to the snakes feeding behavior and immunological resistance. Two parasites were discovered in the subspecies orinus and merremi. The first were adults of the nematode Ophidascaris sp. in the stomach. Also cystacaths of the acanthocephalan Oligatanthorynchus spira were in the peritoneum. The prevalence found in the four different regions, northern and southern coastal Atlantic forest and northern and southern inland Atlantic forest, were observed in Pizatto's and Marques' study. The lowest prevalence was seen in the northern coastal Atlantic forest. The level of parasite infestation did not differ between the males and females. Female reproductive status was unaffected by the level of infection, nor was the number of eggs she carried. The male reproductive system was unaffected by the level of infestation as well.
