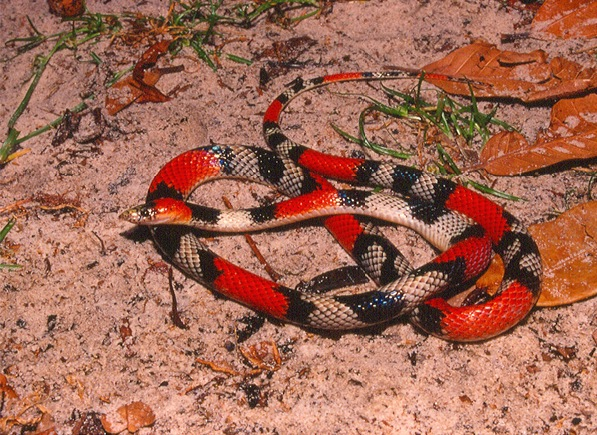

Conservation status
- Least Concern (IUCN 3.1)

Scientific classification
- Kingdom: Animalia
- Phylum: Chordata
- Class: Reptilia
- Order: Squamata
- Suborder: Serpentes
- Family: Colubridae
- Genus: Oxyrhopus
- Species: O. trigeminus

Binomial name
- Oxyrhopus trigeminus A.M.C. Duméril, Bibron, & A.H.A. Duméril, 1854

= Oxyrhopus trigeminus =

Species of snake

Oxyrhopus trigeminus , the Brazilian false coral snake, is a species of snake in the family Colubridae. The species is native to Brazil, Bolivia, and Peru.

== Description ==
Adult females can reach lengths of up to 1 m, whereas males are smaller, typically reaching lengths of up to 80 cm.

== Diet ==
The Brazilian false coral snake preys on small vertebrates that inhabit the ground or low vegetation, including mostly lizards, but also mammals such as rodents and marsupials, and occasionally birds. It subdues its prey mostly through constriction, but small prey can also be immobilized by injecting venom with its rear fangs.
