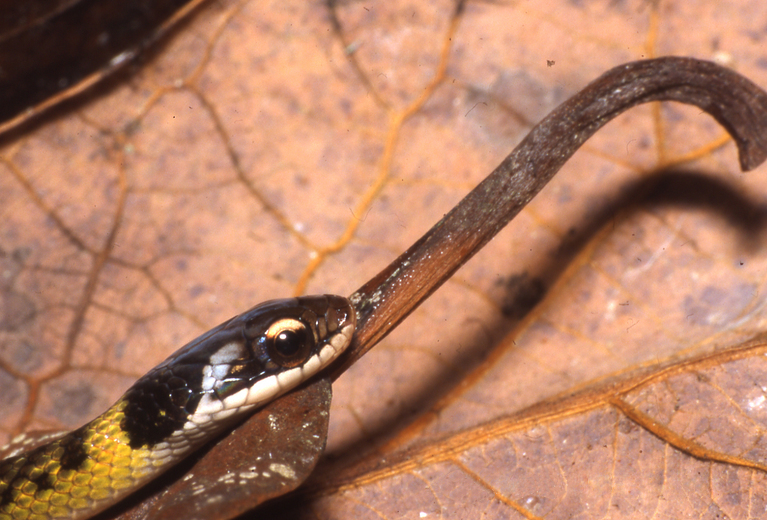

Conservation status
- Least Concern (IUCN 3.1)

Scientific classification
- Kingdom: Animalia
- Phylum: Chordata
- Class: Reptilia
- Order: Squamata
- Suborder: Serpentes
- Family: Colubridae
- Genus: Erythrolamprus
- Species: E. reginae

Binomial name
- Erythrolamprus reginae (Linnaeus, 1758)

Synonyms
- Coluber reginæ Linnaeus, 1758; Coronella reginae (Linnaeus, 1758); Liophis reginae (Linnaeus, 1758); Leimadophis reginae (Linnaeus, 1758)

= Royal ground snake =

Species of snake

The royal ground snake (Erythrolamprus reginae) is a species of snake in the family Colubridae. The species is endemic to northern South America.

== Classification ==
Erythrolamprus reginae belongs to the genus Erythrolamprus, which contains over 50 species. The genus Erythrolamprus belongs to the subfamily Dipsadinae, which is sometimes referred to as the family Dipsadidae.

Recent phylogenetic analysis of morphological and molecular DNA evidence has shown that Erythrolamprus reginae is now likely paraphyletic. Erythrolamprus zweifeli was previously considered to be a subspecies of Erythrolamprus reginae and called Erythrolamprus reginae zweifeli. However, based on notable differences in coloration and scale counts, it is now considered to be a separate species. Erythrolamprus pseudoreginae of Tobago, named in 2019, was also previously considered to be part of Erythrolamprus reginae, but is now separate.

The relationships of Erythrolamprus species located in northern South America can be shown in the cladogram below:

- - E. poecilogyrus (paraphyletic)
  - - E. ceii
    - E. poecilogyrus (paraphyletic)
- - E. miliaris
  - E. miliaris
  - - - E. typhlus (Brazil) (paraphyletic)
      - - Erythrolamprus reginae (paraphyletic)
        - - Erythrolamprus reginae (paraphyletic)
          - E. zweifeli
    - - E. breviceps
      - E. epinephalus (Peru) (paraphyletic)
      - - - E. epinephalus (Costa Rica) (paraphyletic)
          - E. pseudoreginae
        - E. melanotus
  - - - E. atraventer
      - - E. jaegeri
        - E. almadensis
    - - - E. juliae
        - E. cursor
      - E. typhlus (French Guiana) (paraphyletic)
    - - E. cobella
      - - - E. aesculapii (Brazil) (paraphyletic)
          - E. ocellatus
        - - E. aesculapii (French Guiana & Guyana) (paraphyletic)
          - - E. bizona
            - E. mimus

== Diet ==
It feeds on frogs, frog eggs, tadpoles, fish, small birds, and lizards.

=== Experiment ===
In an experiment conducted by biologists from the University of California, Berkeley, 10 royal ground snakes from the Colombian Amazon were starved for several days then offered highly toxic three-striped poison dart frogs (Ameerega trivittata). Six snakes refused to eat, while four attempted to consume the frogs, first dragging them across the ground, similar to the way birds rub toxins off their prey, before swallowing. Three of the four snakes survived, suggesting that their livers and possibly other physiological mechanisms can detoxify or neutralize the frog's poisons.
