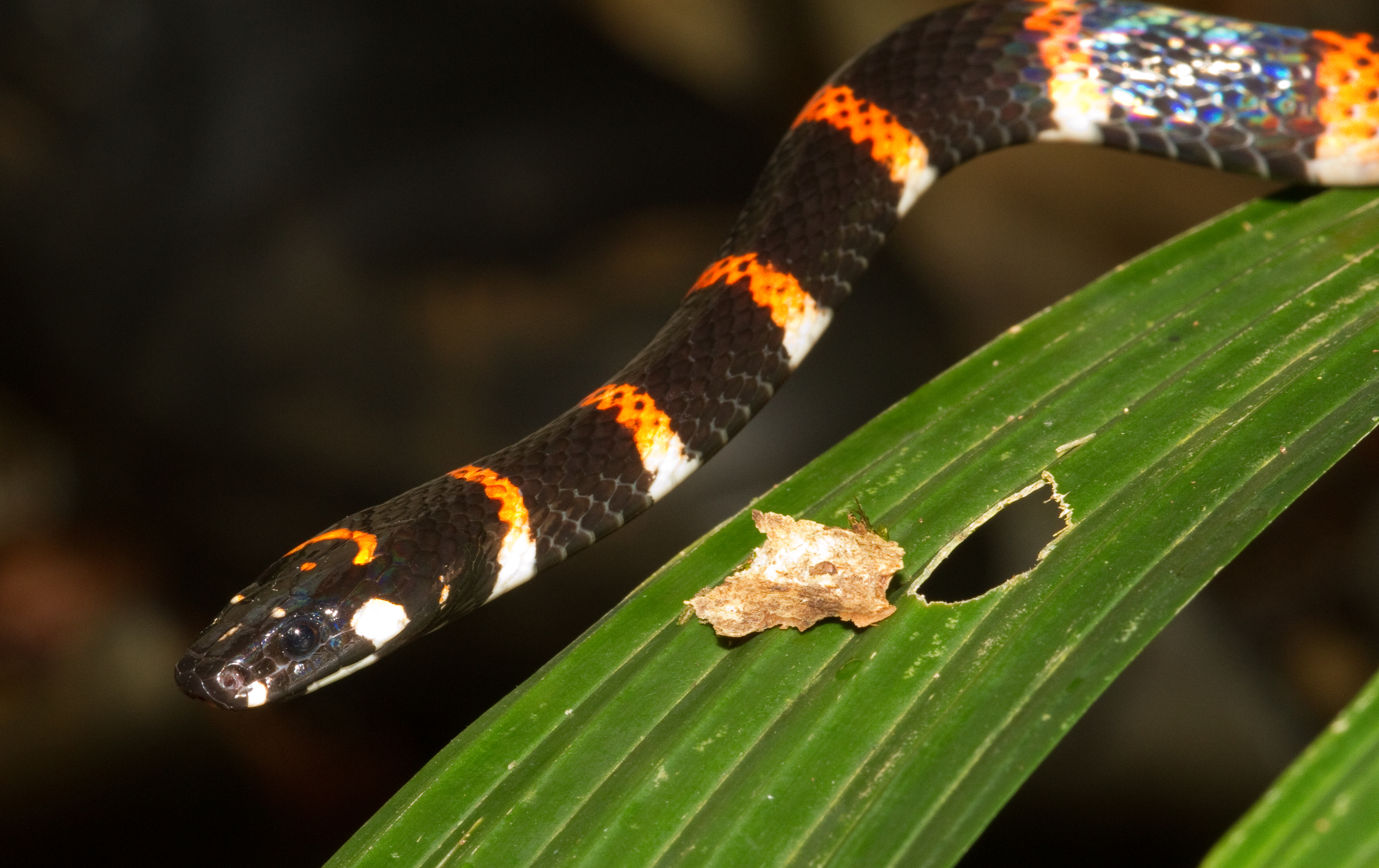

Conservation status
- Least Concern (IUCN 3.1)

Scientific classification
- Kingdom: Animalia
- Phylum: Chordata
- Class: Reptilia
- Order: Squamata
- Suborder: Serpentes
- Family: Colubridae
- Genus: Pliocercus
- Species: P. euryzonus

Binomial name
- Pliocercus euryzonus Cope, 1862

Synonyms
- Pliocercus euryzonus Cope, 1862; Liophis splendens Jan, 1863; Elapochrus euryzona — Günther, 1893; Urotheca euryzona — Boulenger, 1894

= Pliocercus euryzonus =

Species of snake

Pliocercus euryzonus, commonly known as Cope's false coral snake, is a species of snake in the subfamily Dipsadinae of the family Colubridae. The species is indigenous to southeastern Central America and northwestern South America. There are two recognized subspecies.

== Geographic range ==
P. euryzonus is found in Colombia, Costa Rica, Ecuador, Honduras, Nicaragua, and Panama. The Reptile Database also lists Guatemala and Peru.

== Habitat ==
The preferred natural habitat of P. euryzonus is forest, at altitudes from sea level to 1,460 m (4,790 ft).

== Reproduction ==
P. euryzonus is oviparous.

== Subspecies ==
Including the nominotypical subspecies, two subspecies are recognized as being valid.

- Pliocercus euryzonus burghardti H.M. Smith & Chiszar, 1996
- Pliocercus euryzonus euryzonus Cope, 1862

== Etymology ==
The subspecific name, burghardti, is in honor of herpetologist Gordon M. Burghardt.
