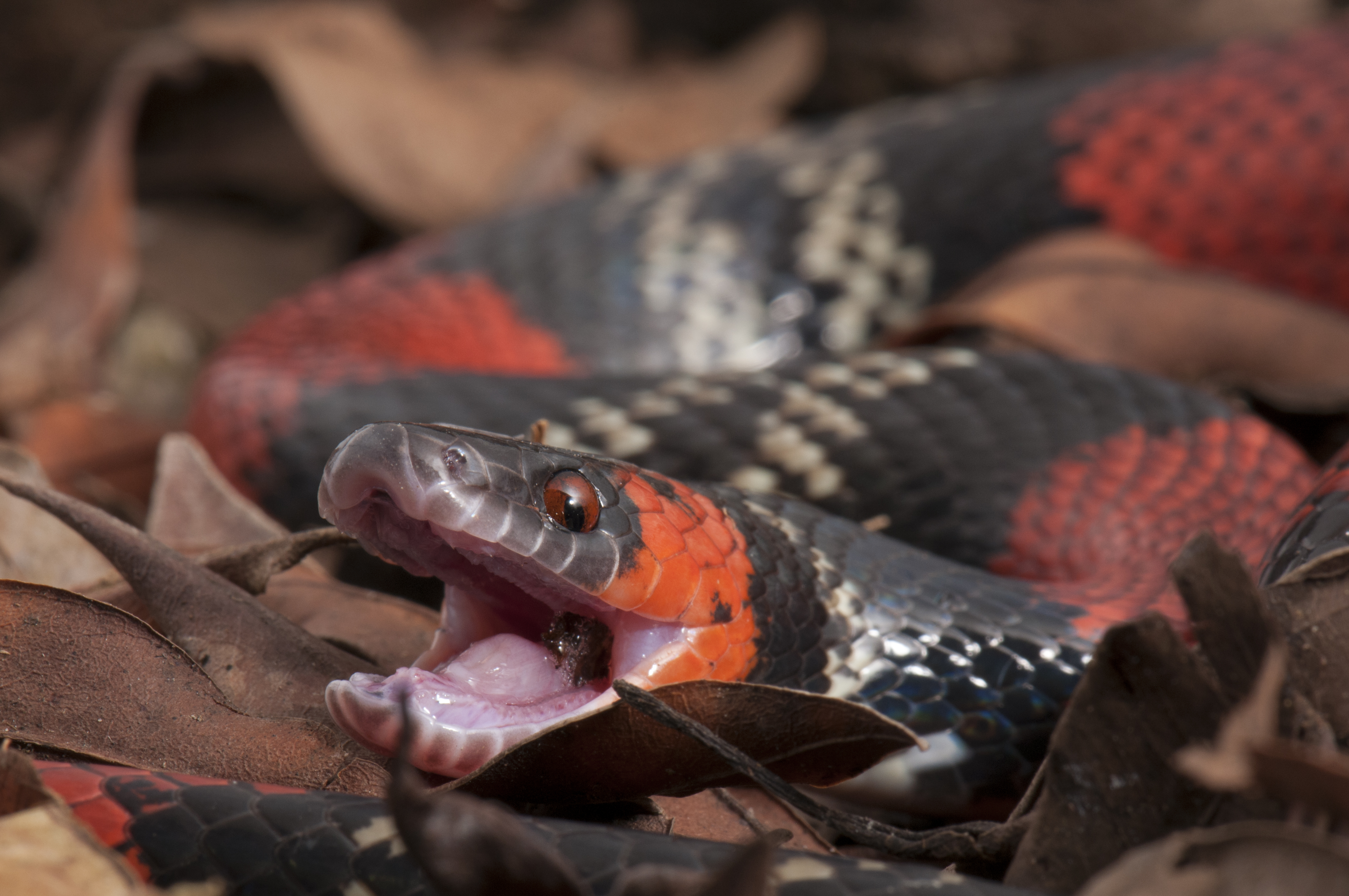

Conservation status
- Least Concern (IUCN 3.1)

Scientific classification
- Kingdom: Animalia
- Phylum: Chordata
- Class: Reptilia
- Order: Squamata
- Suborder: Serpentes
- Family: Colubridae
- Genus: Oxyrhopus
- Species: O. guibei

Binomial name
- Oxyrhopus guibei Hoge & Romano, 1977

Synonyms
- Oxyrhopus trigeminus guibei Hoge & Romano, 1977; Oxyrhopus guibei — Zaher & Caramaschi, 1992

= Oxyrhopus guibei =

Species of snake

Oxyrhopus guibei is a species of snake in the family Colubridae. The species is endemic to South America. It is often called the false coral snake, but this common name can refer to any of a long list of other species, genera, and even entire families of snakes. Many nonvenomous snakes have evolved coloration that mimics that of venomous true coral snakes, a trait which helps them avoid predation.

== Etymology ==
The specific name, guibei, is in honor of French herpetologist Jean Guibé.

== Geographic range ==
O. guibei is native to central sections of South America, in parts of Bolivia, Brazil, Paraguay, and Argentina.

== Conservation status ==
The species O. guibei has been described as common to abundant.

== Description ==
O. guibei can reach 1 m (3.3 ft) to 1.25 m (4.1 ft) in total length (including tail). Females can reach much larger sizes than males.

== Habitat ==
The preferred natural habitat of O. guibei is forest, including forest edges and open areas. The snake is sometimes seen near human activity and habitation, for example, on farms and in backyards.

== Behavior ==
O. guibei is mostly nocturnal, but is sometimes out basking during the day. It spends most of its time on the ground, but it will climb trees at times.

== Diet ==
The diet of O. guibei includes rodents, lizards, and other small animals. Rodent prey items include rats (Rattus sp.), the hairy-tailed bolo mouse (Necromys lasiurus), the house mouse (Mus musculus), the small vesper mouse (Calomys laucha), the delicate vesper mouse (Calomys tener), and hocicudos (Oxymycterus sp.). It will eat the lizard Tropidurus itambere and it has been observed taking white-tipped dove nestlings (Leptotila sp.). Lizards it will swallow alive, but rodents it often constricts first.

== Reproduction ==
The female O. guibei lays eggs year-round, but male and female reproductive activity slows around the end of the rainy season. Clutch sizes range from about 3 to 20, with an average size of about 11. Longer females lay more eggs. Eggs are laid in nest sites such as cavities in rock piles and abandoned rabbit burrows. The female abandons the eggs once they are laid.

== Enemies ==
Predators of the species O. guibei include the laughing falcon (Herpetotheres cachinnans), a bird which specializes in snakes, and Erythrolamprus aesculapii, another species of false coral snake. It has also been observed in the diet of the maned wolf (Chrysocyon brachyurus), which readily eats snakes, including venomous species.

== Defensive behavior ==
O. guibei performs defensive behaviors when threatened, such as "brusque" thrashing, staying still or rushing to escape, compressing or inflating its body, coiling, hiding its head, or producing a cloacal discharge.
