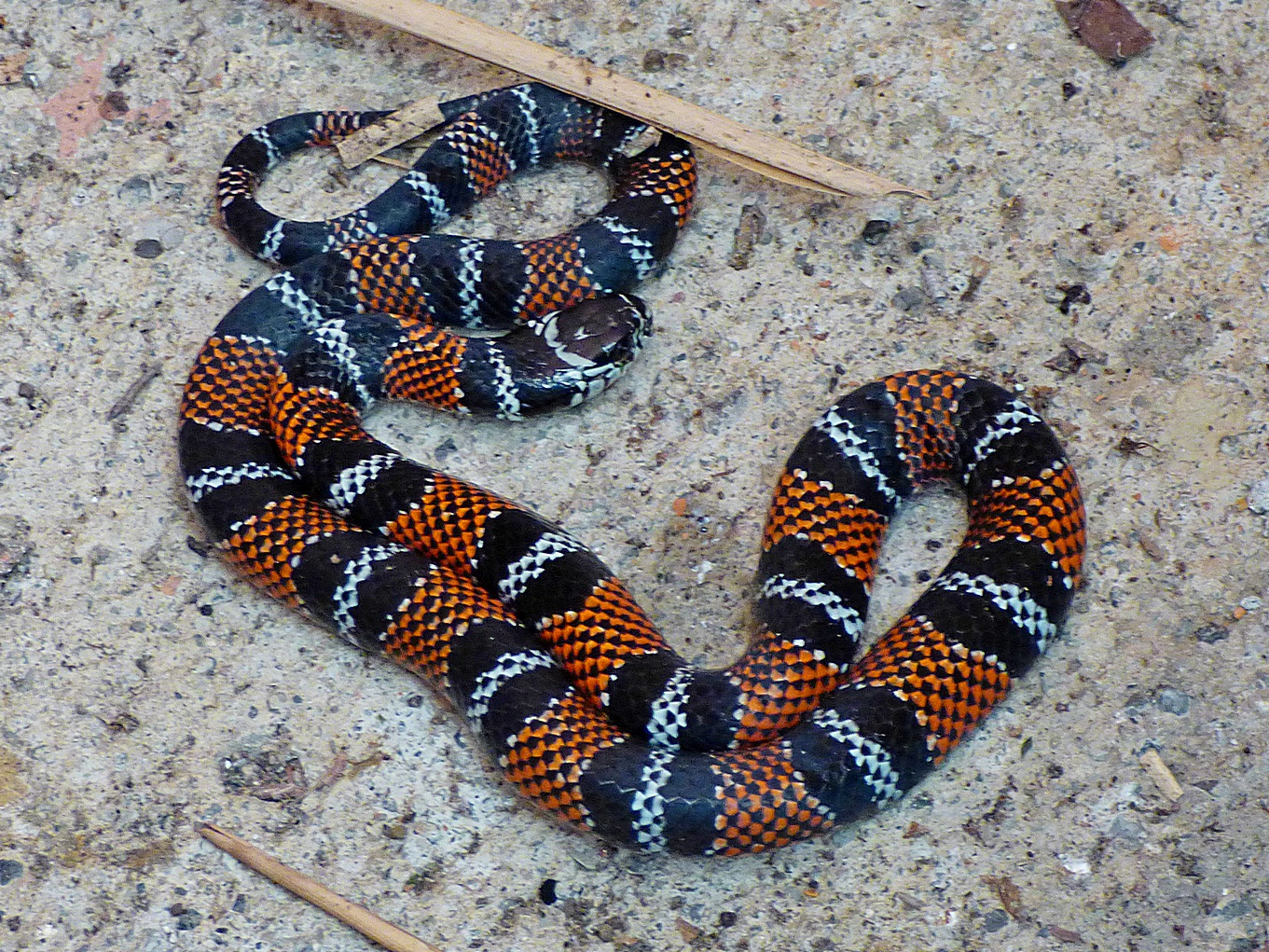

Conservation status
- Least Concern (IUCN 3.1)

Scientific classification
- Kingdom: Animalia
- Phylum: Chordata
- Class: Reptilia
- Order: Squamata
- Suborder: Serpentes
- Family: Colubridae
- Subfamily: Dipsadinae
- Genus: Erythrolamprus
- Species: E. bizona

Binomial name
- Erythrolamprus bizona Jan, 1863

Synonyms
- Erythrolamprus aesculapii var. bizona Jan, 1863; Erythrolamprus bizonus Savage, 2002 (missp.)

= Erythrolamprus bizona =

Species of snake

Erythrolamprus bizona, commonly known as the double-banded false coral snake, is a species of colubrid snake, which is found in northern South America and Central America.

== Classification ==
Erythrolamprus bizona belongs to the genus Erythrolamprus, which contains over 50 species. The genus Erythrolamprus belongs to the subfamily Dipsadinae, which is sometimes referred to as the family Dipsadidae. The relationships of Erythrolamprus species located in northern South America (Venezuela) can be shown in the cladogram below, based on molecular DNA analysis:

- - E. poecilogyrus (paraphyletic)
  - - E. ceii
    - E. poecilogyrus (paraphyletic)
- - E. miliaris
  - E. miliaris
  - - - E. typhlus (Brazil) (paraphyletic)
      - - E. reginae (paraphyletic)
        - - E. reginae (paraphyletic)
          - E. zweifeli
    - - E. breviceps
      - E. epinephalus (Peru) (paraphyletic)
      - - - E. epinephalus (Costa Rica) (paraphyletic)
          - E. pseudoreginae
        - E. melanotus
  - - - E. atraventer
      - - E. jaegeri
        - E. almadensis
    - - - E. juliae
        - E. cursor
      - E. typhlus (French Guiana) (paraphyletic)
    - - E. cobella
      - - - E. aesculapii (Brazil) (paraphyletic)
          - E. ocellatus
        - - E. aesculapii (French Guiana & Guyana) (paraphyletic)
          - - Erythrolamprus bizona
            - E. mimus

== Geographic range ==
It is found in Colombia, Venezuela, Costa Rica, Nicaragua, Panama, and on the island of Trinidad (in the Republic of Trinidad and Tobago).

== Mimicry ==
Similar in pattern to a coral snake, this species probably gains protection through mimicry.

== Diet ==
It feeds mainly on other snakes.

== Habitat ==
It is a forest dweller, often found in the leaf litter or burrowed in the soil in rain forests.

== Symbiotic relationship ==
It burrows primarily near the Pouteria caimito, commonly known as the abiu, a tropical fruit tree, the nutrients of which supply the snake's clutch of eggs. In turn the tree is fertilized by the snake's urine and embryotic fluid.
