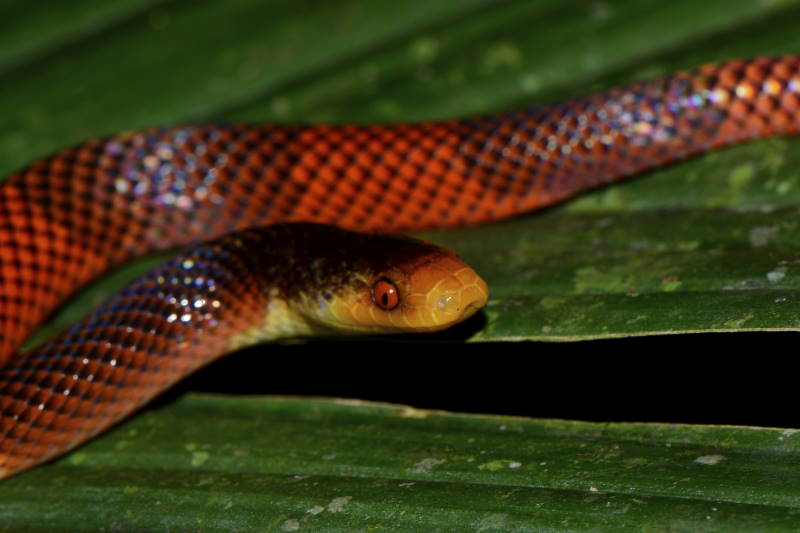
- Oxyrhopus formosus

Conservation status
- Least Concern (IUCN 3.1)

Scientific classification
- Kingdom: Animalia
- Phylum: Chordata
- Class: Reptilia
- Order: Squamata
- Suborder: Serpentes
- Family: Colubridae
- Genus: Oxyrhopus
- Species: O. formosus

Binomial name
- Oxyrhopus formosus (Wied-Neuwied, 1820)

Synonyms
- Coluber formosus Wied-Neuwied, 1820; Natrix occipitalis Wagler, 1824

= Oxyrhopus formosus =

Species of snake

Oxyrhopus formosus (vernacular names: beautiful calico snake, Formosa false coral snake) is a neotropical snake of the family Dipsadidae. Its distribution is not fully understood, because of inaccurate identifications and confusion with other Oxyrhopus species. It has been reported from Brazil, Colombia, and Peru. Reports from the Guiana region are based on misidentified O. occipitalis. Oxyrhopus formosus are robust, the head is entirely yellow, and adults are red with prominent black bands; O. occipitalis are slender, the snout is yellow and the top of head is brown, and adults are red with faint crossbands.
