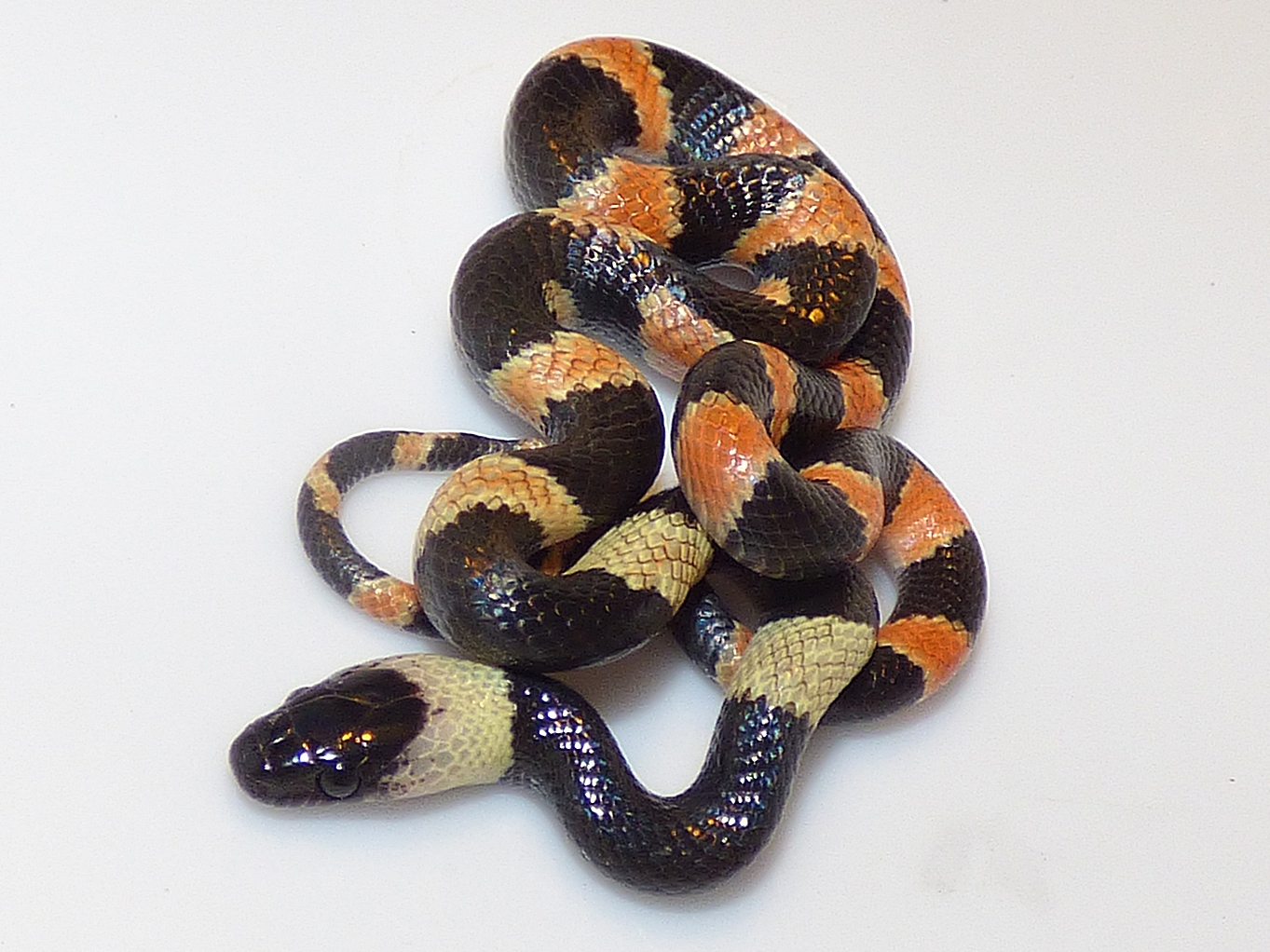
- Dapa, Colombia

Conservation status
- Least Concern (IUCN 3.1)

Scientific classification
- Kingdom: Animalia
- Phylum: Chordata
- Class: Reptilia
- Order: Squamata
- Suborder: Serpentes
- Family: Colubridae
- Genus: Oxyrhopus
- Species: O. petolarius

Binomial name
- Oxyrhopus petolarius (Linnaeus, 1758)

Synonyms
- Coluber petola Linnaeus, 1758; Lycodon petolarius — Schlegel, 1837; Oxyrhopus petolarius — A.M.C. Duméril, Bibron & A.H.A. Duméril, 1854; Clelia petola — Stuart, 1937; Clelia petolaria — Taylor, 1951; Oxyrhopus petola — Gasc & Rodrigues, 1980; Oxyrhopus petolarius — Savage, 2011

= Oxyrhopus petolarius =

Species of snake

Oxyrhopus petolarius, commonly known as the forest flame snake, is a species of mildly venomous snake in the subfamily Dipsadinae of the family Colubridae. The species is native to Central and South America. There are three recognized subspecies.

== Taxonomy and nomenclature ==
According to American herpetologist Jay M. Savage (2011) the correct scientific name should be Oxyrhopus petolarius.

== Geographic range ==
Oxyrhopus petolarius is found in central and northern South America, including Trinidad and Tobago.

== Habitat ==
The preferred natural habitats of Oxyrhopus petolarius are forest and savanna, at altitudes from sea level to 2,000 m (6,600 ft).

== Description ==
Adults of Oxyrhopus petolarius may attain a total length of 91 cm (36 in), which includes a tail 22 cm (8.7 in) long.

Coloration is variable. It usually consists of some combination of red and black rings or crossbands. In some individuals the light-colored crossbands are white instead of red on the anterior part of the body.

The dorsal scales are smooth, with apical pits, and are arranged in 19 rows at midbody.

== Venom ==
Oxyrhopus petolarius is rear-fanged, and its venom is extremely toxic to anole lizards.

== Diet ==
Oxyrhopus petolarius preys on lizards, frogs, other amphibians, tadpoles, small rodents, other small mammals, birds and their eggs, and probably other snakes.

== Reproduction ==
Oxyrhopus petolarius is oviparous.

== Subspecies ==
Three subspecies of Oxyrhopus petolarius are recognized as being valid, including the nominotypical subspecies.

- Oxyrhopus petolarius digitalis (Reuss, 1834)
- Oxyrhopus petolarius petolarius (Linnaeus, 1758)
- Oxyrhopus petolarius sebae A.M.C. Duméril, Bibron & A.H.A. Duméril, 1854

Nota bene: A trinomial authority in parentheses indicates that the subspecies was originally described in a genus other than Oxyrhopus.

== Etymology ==
The subspecific name, sebae, is in honor of Dutch naturalist Albertus Seba.
