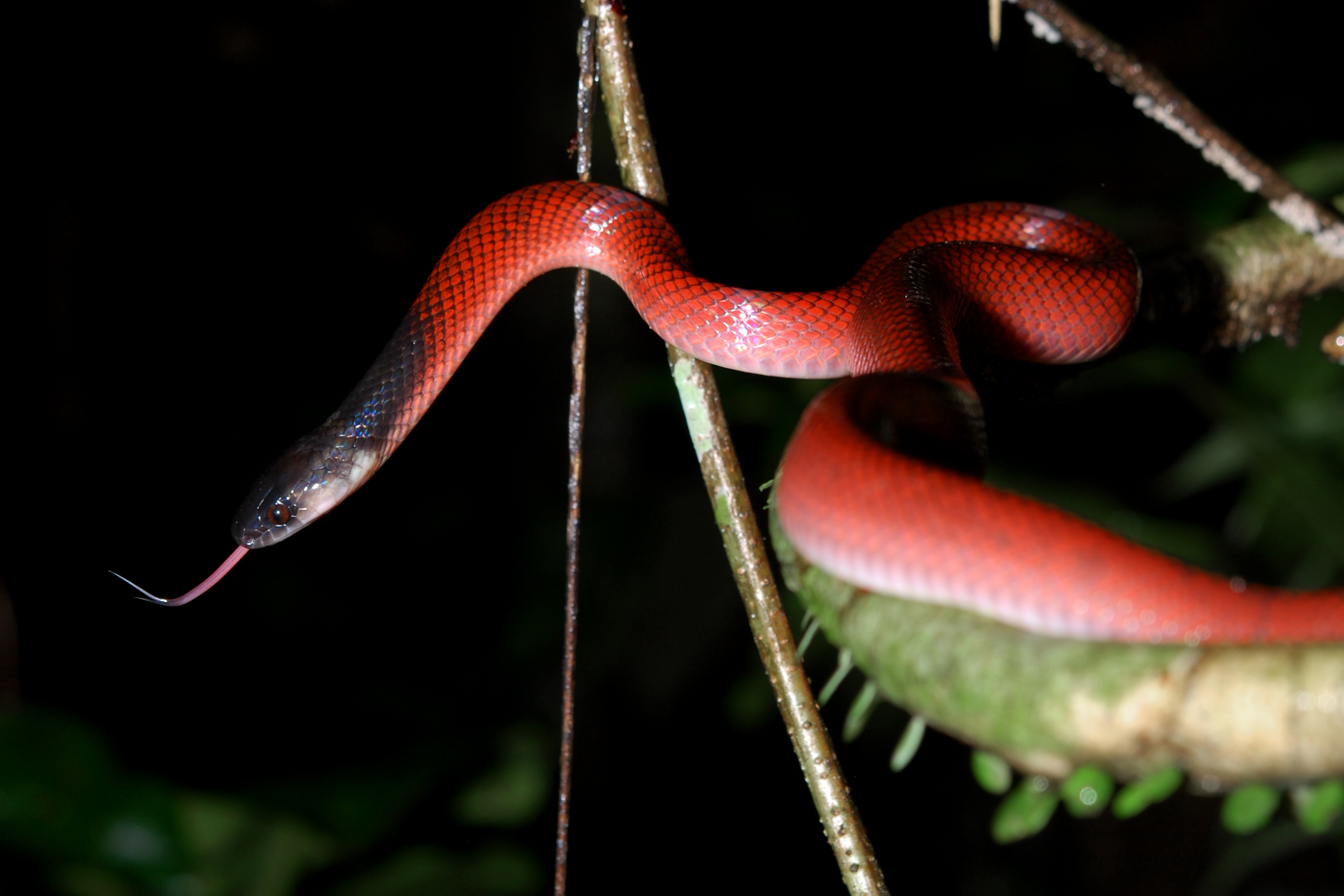
- Oxyrhopus melanogenys in Ecuador.

Scientific classification
- Domain: Eukaryota
- Kingdom: Animalia
- Phylum: Chordata
- Class: Reptilia
- Order: Squamata
- Suborder: Serpentes
- Family: Colubridae
- Subfamily: Dipsadinae
- Genus: Oxyrhopus; Wagler, 1830

Synonyms
- Brachyruton, Clelia, Coluber, Duberria, Erythrolamprus, Lycodon, Olisthenes, Phimophis, Pseudoboa, Rhinosimus, Scytale, Siphlophis, Sphenocephalus

= Oxyrhopus =

Genus of snakes

Oxyrhopus, the false coral snakes, is a genus of colubrid snakes that belong to the subfamily Dipsadinae. All 15 members of the genus are found in the northern part of South America, with the native range of the most widespread member, Oxyrhopus petolarius, extending into Central America and Trinidad and Tobago as well.

== Species ==
The following 15 species are recognized as being valid.

- Oxyrhopus clathratus A.M.C. Duméril, Bibron & A.H.A. Duméril, 1854 – Duméril's false coral snake
- Oxyrhopus doliatus A.M.C. Duméril, Bibron & A.H.A. Duméril, 1854 – Bibron's false coral snake
- Oxyrhopus emberti Gonzales, Reichle & Entiauspe-Neto, 2020
- Oxyrhopus erdisii (Barbour, 1913)
- Oxyrhopus fitzingeri (Tschudi, 1845) – Fitzinger's false coral snake
- Oxyrhopus formosus (Wied-Neuwied, 1820) – Formosa false coral snake, beautiful calico snake
- Oxyrhopus guibei Hoge & Romano, 1977
- Oxyrhopus leucomelas (F. Werner, 1916) – Werner's false coral snake
- Oxyrhopus marcapatae (Boulenger, 1902) – Boulenger's false coral snake
- Oxyrhopus melanogenys (Tschudi, 1845) – Tschudi's false coral snake
- Oxyrhopus occipitalis (Wied-Neuwied, 1824)
- Oxyrhopus petolarius (Linnaeus, 1758) – forest flame snake
- Oxyrhopus rhombifer A.M.C. Duméril, Bibron & A.H.A. Duméril, 1854 – Amazon false coral snake
- Oxyrhopus trigeminus A.M.C. Duméril, Bibron & A.H.A. Duméril, 1854 – Brazilian false coral snake
- Oxyrhopus vanidicus Lynch, 2009

The former Oxyrhopus venezuelanus Shreve, 1947 is currently considered a synonym of Oxyrhopus doliatus.

Nota bene: In the above list, a binomial authority in parentheses indicates that the species was originally described in a genus other than Oxyrhopus.

== Description ==
Species in the genus Oxyrhopus share the following characters:

Head distinct from neck. Eye moderate or small. Pupil vertically elliptic. Body cylindrical or slightly laterally compressed. Tail moderate or long.

Dorsal scales smooth, with apical pits, and arranged in 19 rows at midbody.

Maxillary teeth 10–15, subequal, followed after a gap by two enlarged grooved teeth, located just behind the posterior border of the eye.
