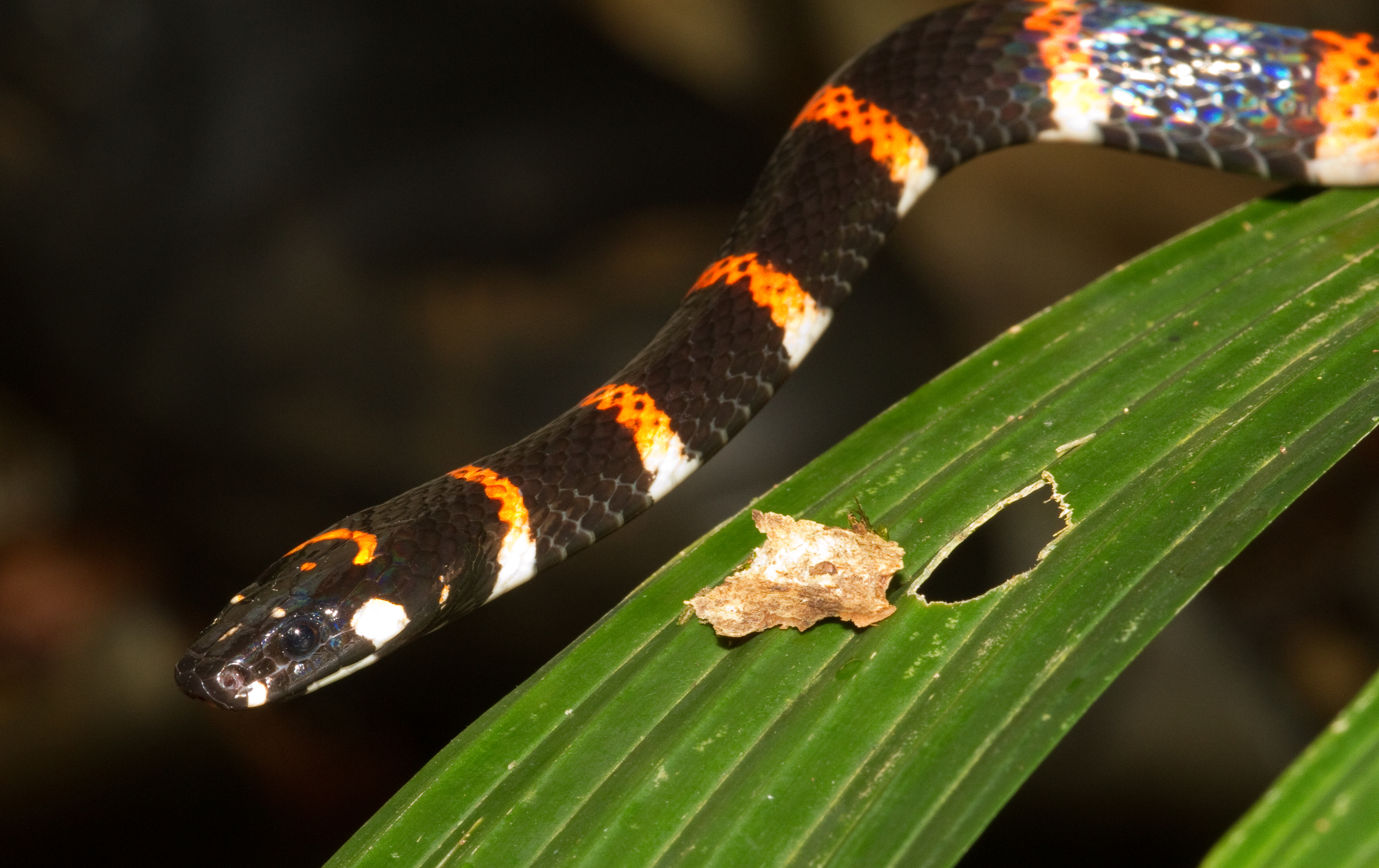
- Cope's false coral snake
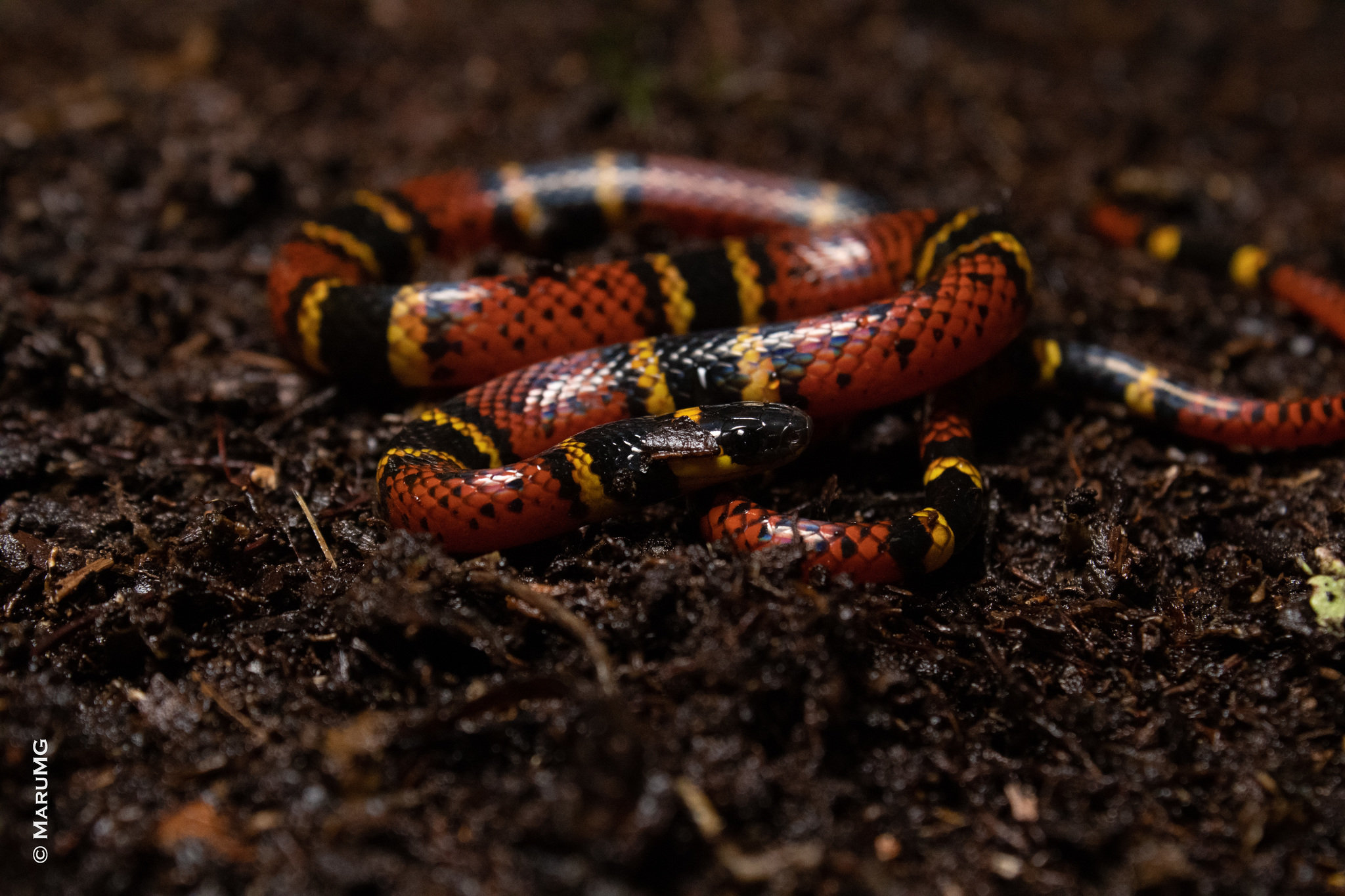
- Variegated false coral snake

Scientific classification
- Domain: Eukaryota
- Kingdom: Animalia
- Phylum: Chordata
- Class: Reptilia
- Order: Squamata
- Suborder: Serpentes
- Family: Colubridae
- Subfamily: Dipsadinae
- Genus: Pliocercus; Cope, 1860

= Pliocercus =

Genus of snakes

Pliocercus is a genus of snakes in the subfamily Dipsadinae.

== Geographic range ==
Species in the genus Pliocercus are found in Mexico, Central America, and northern South America.

== Species and subspecies ==
The following species and subspecies are recognized as being valid.

- Pliocercus elapoides Cope, 1860 – variegated false coral snake
  - Pliocercus elapoides aequalis Salvin, 1861
  - Pliocercus elapoides diastema (Bocourt, 1886)
  - Pliocercus elapoides elapoides Cope, 1860
  - Pliocercus elapoides occidentalis H.M. Smith & Landy, 1965
- Pliocercus euryzonus Cope, 1862 – Cope's false coral snake
  - Pliocercus euryzonus burghardti H.M. Smith & Chiszar, 1996
  - Pliocercus euryzonus euryzonus Cope, 1862

Nota bene: A trinomial authority in parentheses indicates that the subspecies was originally described in a genus other than Pliocercus.
