= Forte Príncipe da Beira =

- Costa Marques, Rondônia in Brazil
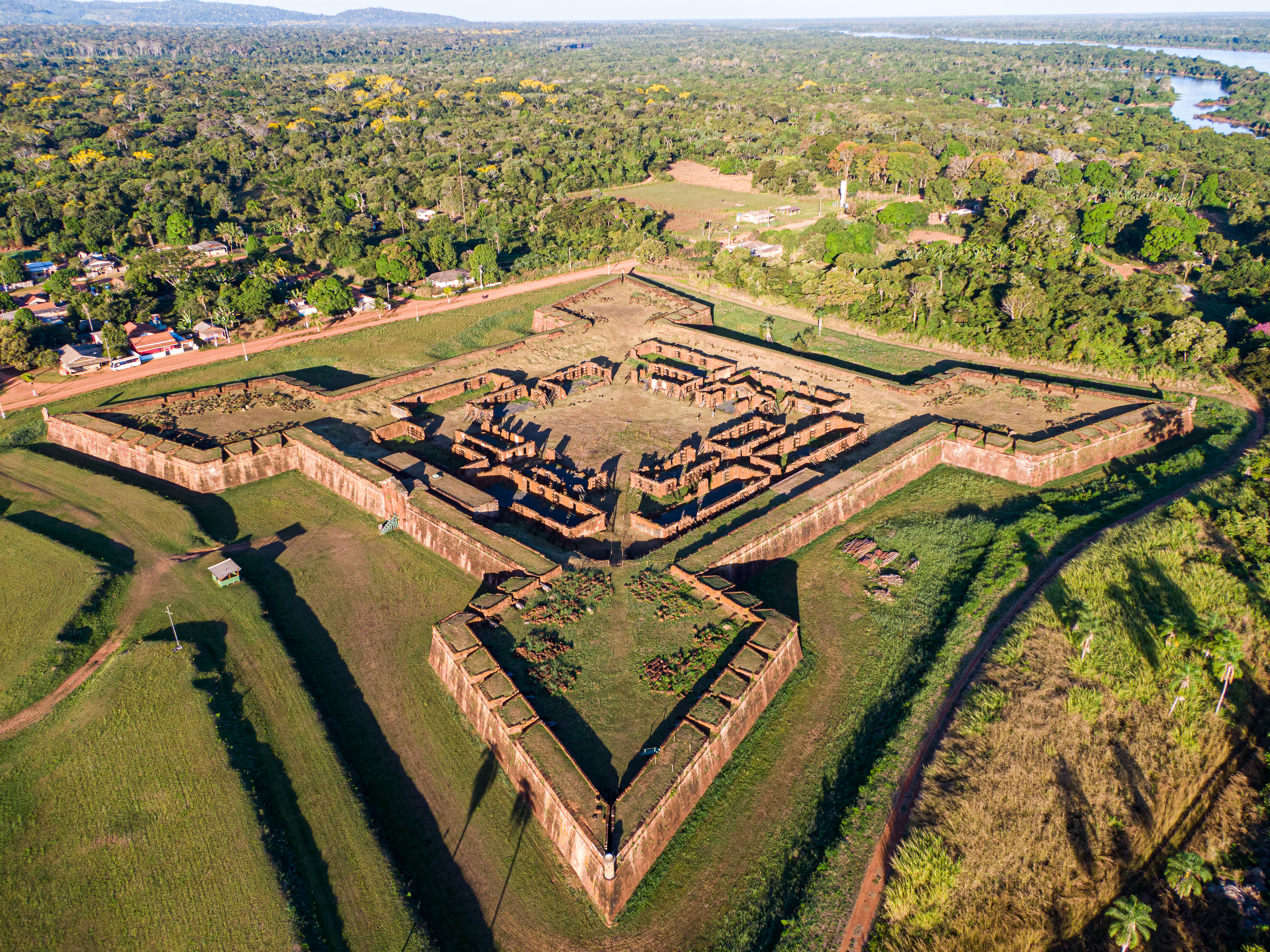
- View of the fortification

Site information
- Type: Fort

Location
- Location of Forte Príncipe da Beira in Brazil
- Coordinates: 12°25′40″S 64°25′22″W
- Height: 10 m
- Length: 1 km

Site history
- Built: 1776–1783
- In use: 1889

Forte Principe da Beira (Portuguese for "Prince of Beira Fortress") is a fortification on the lower part of the Guaporé River close to its confluence with the Mamoré River in the Brazilian state of Rondônia.

The fort was built from 1776 to 1783 and is one of only two forts that the Portuguese Empire built in the inner regions of Brazil. It was named after the heir of Portugal, styled as the Prince of Beira. The Portuguese built it to secure their border against the expanding Spanish Empire, which controlled the areas to the southwest of Rondônia. The military use of the fort was abandoned in 1889.

The fort has an outer wall with a height of 10 m and a length of 1 km. It has four bastions, which originally carried 14 cannons each. Only one of those cannons still remains today. Inside the wall there are ruins of a chapel, soldier quarters, a prison and various utility buildings.

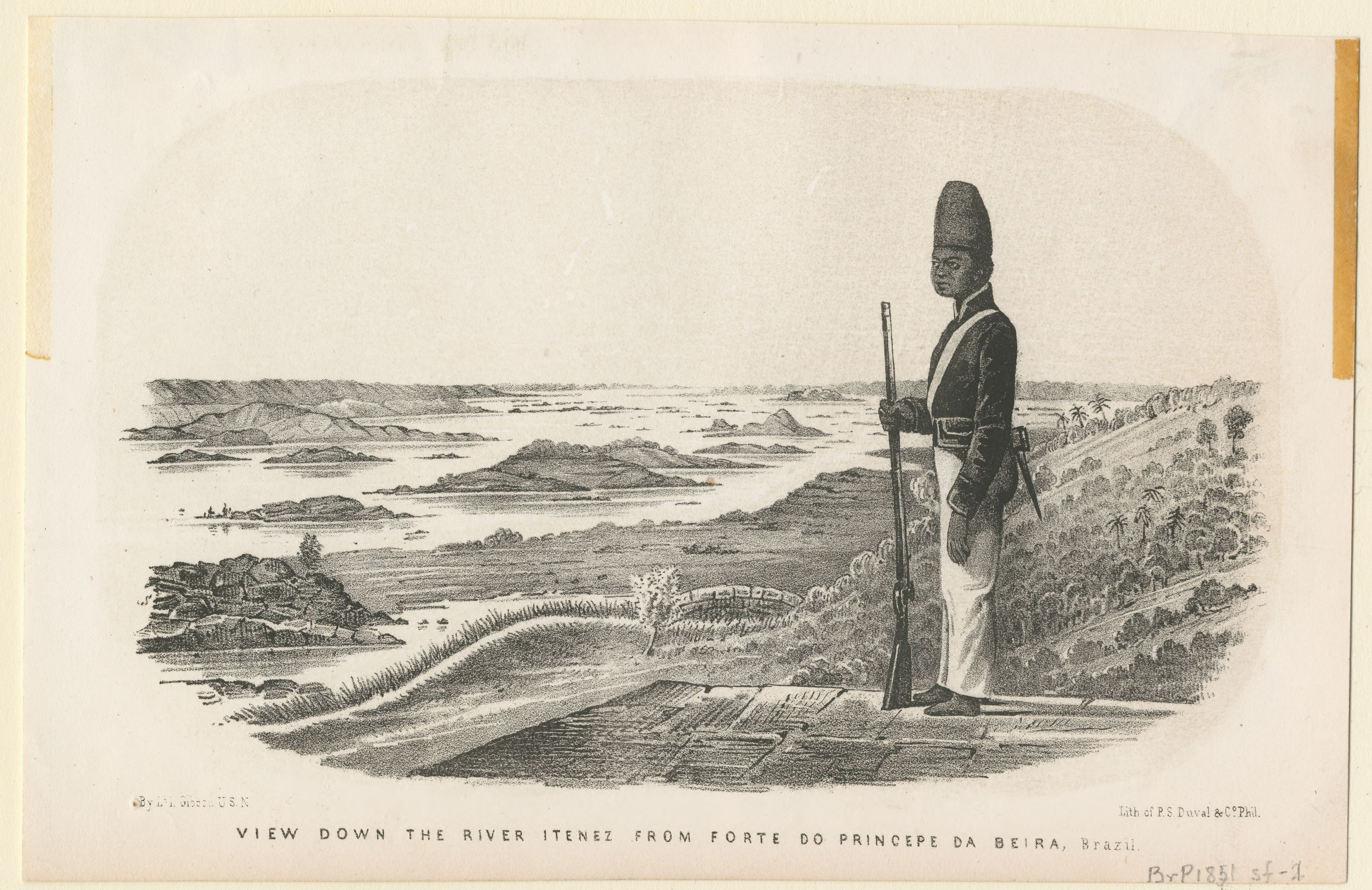
View down the River Itenez from Forte do Principe da Beira, Brazil, lithograph by Lardner Gibbon in the book Exploration of the Valley of the Amazon, 1854
