= São Francisco do Guaporé =

Municipality in Rondônia, Brazil

- Municipality
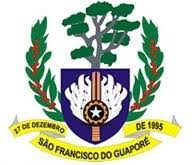
- Flag Coat of arms

- Location in Rondônia state

- Location in Brazil
- Coordinates: 12°3′8″S 63°34′3″W
- Country: Brazil
- Region: North
- State: Rondônia

Population (2020)
  - Total: 20,681
- Time zone: UTC−4 (AMT)

São Francisco do Guaporé is a municipality located in the Brazilian state of Rondônia. Its population was 20,681 (2020) and its area is 10,960 km^{2}.

The municipality contains 9% of the 36,442-hectare (90,050-acre) Serra dos Reis State Park. It contains 86% of the 2,244-hectare (5,550-acre) Serra dos Reis A State Park, created in 1996. It holds part of the 615,771-hectare (1,521,600-acre) Guaporé Biological Reserve, a strictly protected conservation unit.

== See also ==
- List of municipalities in Rondônia
