= Oxyrhopus vanidicus =

Conservation status
- Least Concern (IUCN 3.1)

Scientific classification
- Kingdom: Animalia
- Phylum: Chordata
- Class: Reptilia
- Order: Squamata
- Suborder: Serpentes
- Family: Colubridae
- Genus: Oxyrhopus
- Species: O. vanidicus

Binomial name
- Oxyrhopus vanidicus Lynch, 2009

Species of snake

Oxyrhopus vanidicus is a species of snake in the family Colubridae. The species is native to Brazil, Colombia, Venezuela, Ecuador, and Peru.
