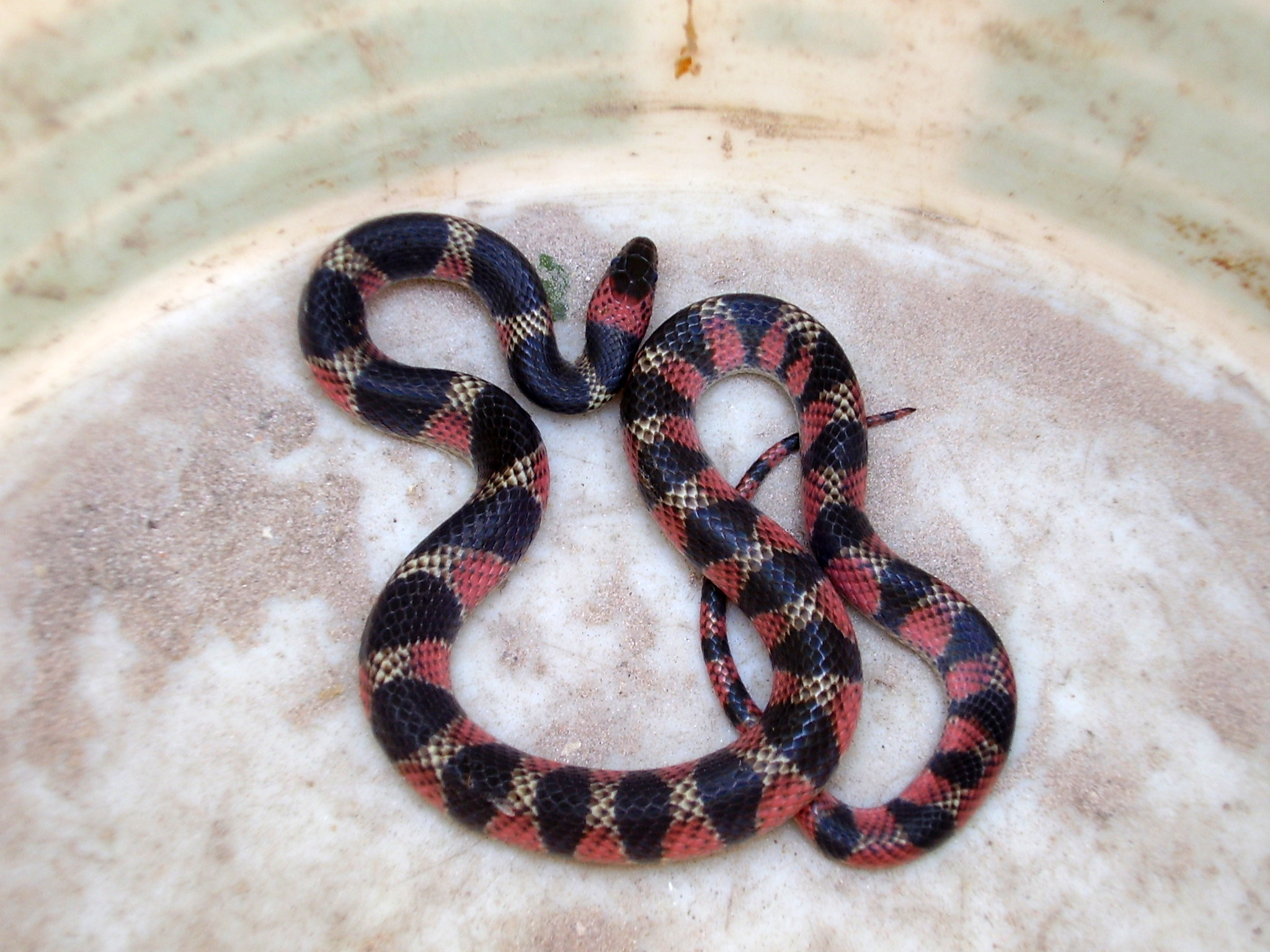

Conservation status
- Least Concern (IUCN 3.1)

Scientific classification
- Kingdom: Animalia
- Phylum: Chordata
- Class: Reptilia
- Order: Squamata
- Suborder: Serpentes
- Family: Colubridae
- Genus: Oxyrhopus
- Species: O. rhombifer

Binomial name
- Oxyrhopus rhombifer A.M.C. Duméril, Bibron, & A.H.A. Duméril, 1854

= Oxyrhopus rhombifer =

Species of snake

Oxyrhopus rhombifer, the Amazon false coral snake, is a species of snake in the family Colubridae. The species is native to Brazil, Bolivia, Paraguay, Uruguay, and Argentina.
