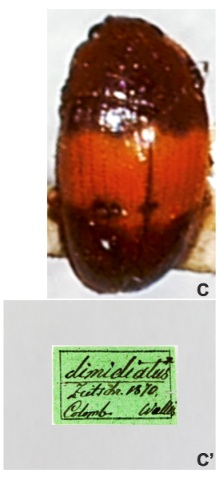

Scientific classification
- Kingdom: Animalia
- Phylum: Arthropoda
- Clade: Pancrustacea
- Class: Insecta
- Order: Coleoptera
- Suborder: Polyphaga
- Infraorder: Cucujiformia
- Family: Erotylidae
- Genus: Mycotretus
- Species: M. dimidiatus

Binomial name
- Mycotretus dimidiatus Taschenberg, 1870

= Mycotretus dimidiatus =

Species of beetle

Mycotretus dimidiatus is a species of beetle of the Erotylidae family. This species is found in Colombia.
