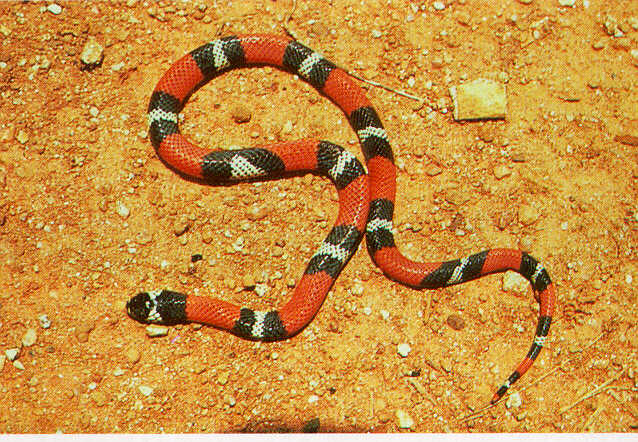

Conservation status
- Least Concern (IUCN 3.1)

Scientific classification
- Kingdom: Animalia
- Phylum: Chordata
- Class: Reptilia
- Order: Squamata
- Suborder: Serpentes
- Family: Colubridae
- Subfamily: Dipsadinae
- Genus: Erythrolamprus
- Species: E. aesculapii

Binomial name
- Erythrolamprus aesculapii (Linnaeus, 1758)

Synonyms
- Coluber æsculapii Linnaeus, 1758; Natrix æsculapii (Linnaeus, 1758)

= Erythrolamprus aesculapii =

Species of snake

Erythrolamprus aesculapii, also known commonly as the Aesculapian false coral snake, the South American false coral snake, and in Portuguese as bacorá, or falsa-coral, is a species of mildly venomous snake in the family Colubridae. The species is endemic to South America.

== Etymology ==
The specific name, aesculapii, refers to Aesculapius, the Greek mythological god of medicine, who is depicted with a snake-entwined staff.

== Classification ==
Erythrolamprus aesculapii belongs to the genus Erythrolamprus, which contains over 50 species. The genus Erythrolamprus belongs to the subfamily Dipsadinae, which is sometimes referred to as the family Dipsadidae.

Molecular phylogenetic DNA analysis has shown that Erythrolamprus aesculapii is likely paraphyletic, as shown in the cladogram below of Erythrolamprus species located in northern South America:

- - E. poecilogyrus (paraphyletic)
  - - E. ceii
    - E. poecilogyrus (paraphyletic)
- - E. miliaris
  - E. miliaris
  - - - E. typhlus (Brazil) (paraphyletic)
      - - E. reginae (paraphyletic)
        - - E. reginae (paraphyletic)
          - E. zweifeli
    - - E. breviceps
      - E. epinephalus (Peru) (paraphyletic)
      - - - E. epinephalus (Costa Rica) (paraphyletic)
          - E. pseudoreginae
        - E. melanotus
  - - - E. atraventer
      - - E. jaegeri
        - E. almadensis
    - - - E. juliae
        - E. cursor
      - E. typhlus (French Guiana) (paraphyletic)
    - - E. cobella
      - - - Erythrolamprus aesculapii (Brazil) (paraphyletic)
          - E. ocellatus
        - - Erythrolamprus aesculapii (French Guiana & Guyana) (paraphyletic)
          - - E. bizona
            - E. mimus

== Geographic range ==
E. aesculapii is found in the Amazon rainforest of South America. It is also found on the island of Trinidad (in the Republic of Trinidad and Tobago).

== Habitat and behavior ==
E. aesculapii is often found in the leaf litter or burrowing in the soil in rain forests, at altitudes from sea level to 2,300 m (7,500 ft).

== Diet ==
E. aesculapii feeds mainly on other snakes, including venomous species. It will also prey on lizards, fish and earthworms. Insects are probably consumed though secondary ingestion.

== Venom ==
E. aesculapii is mildly venomous.

== Mimicry ==
The brightly colored, ringed patterns of snakes of the genus Erythrolamprus resemble those of sympatric coral snakes of the genus Micrurus, and it has been suggested that this is due to mimicry. Whether this is classical Batesian mimicry, classical Müllerian mimicry, a modified form of Müllerian mimicry, or no mimicry at all, remains to be proven.

== Subspecies ==
The following four subspecies are recognized as being valid, including the nominotypical subspecies:

- Erythrolamprus aesculapii aesculapii (Linnaeus, 1758) – Amazon River Basin
- Erythrolamprus aesculapii monozonus Jan, 1863 – Brazil (Bahia state to Rio de Janeiro state)
- Erythrolamprus aesculapii tetrazonus Jan, 1863 – southwestern Bolivia
- Erythrolamprus aesculapii venustissimus (Wied, 1821) – eastern Bolivia to southeastern Brazil and northeastern Argentina
