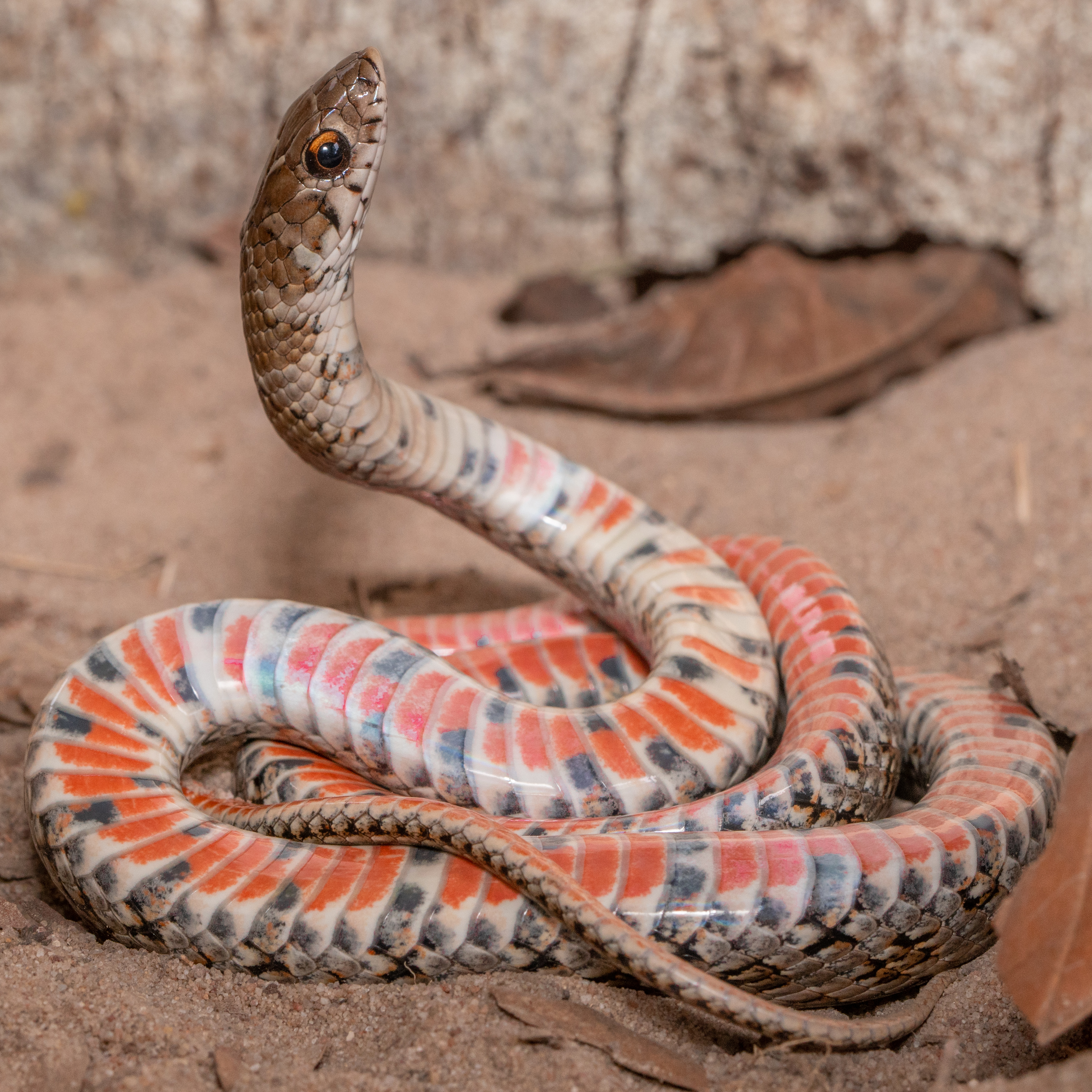
- Almaden ground snake, Erythrolamprus almadensis

Scientific classification
- Kingdom: Animalia
- Phylum: Chordata
- Class: Reptilia
- Order: Squamata
- Suborder: Serpentes
- Family: Colubridae
- Subfamily: Dipsadinae
- Genus: Erythrolamprus; Boie, 1826

Synonyms
- Coluber, Coniophanes, Coronella, Elaps, Glaphyrophis, Natrix, Opheomorphus, Umbrivaga

= Erythrolamprus =

Genus of snakes

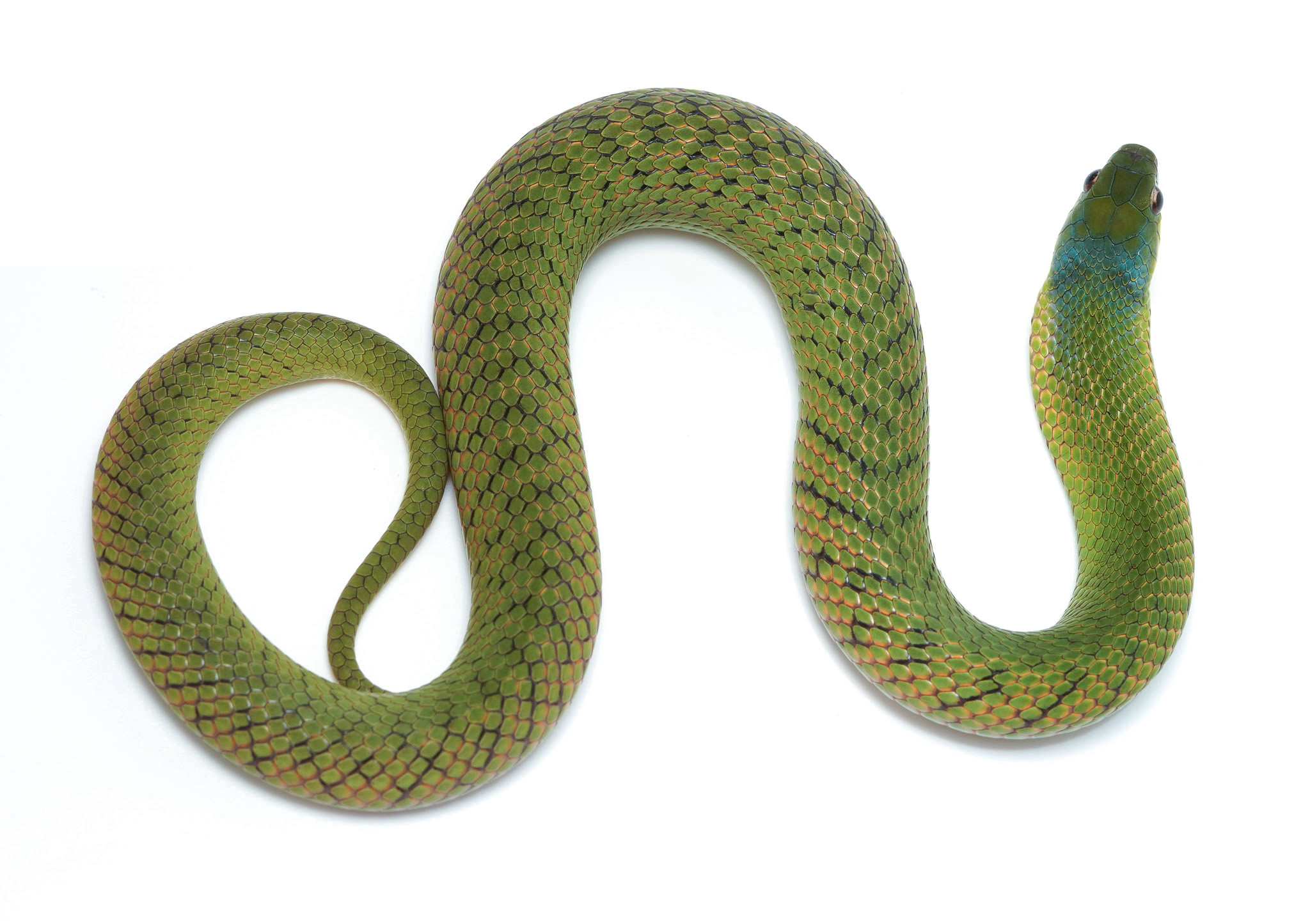
An adult Erythrolamprus typhlus

Erythrolamprus is a genus of colubrid snakes native to Central America, the Caribbean, and South America. They include the false coral snakes, which appear to be coral snake mimics.

== Classification ==
The genus Erythrolamprus belongs to the subfamily Dipsadinae (which is sometimes referred to as the family Dipsadidae), belonging to the family Colubridae. Erythrolamprus previously contained just six species, mostly coral snake mimics. However, molecular studies beginning in 2009 determined that Erythrolamprus was not monophyletic, and thus most of the snakes of the genera Liophis, Leimadophis, and Umbrivaga were placed into Erythrolamprus, bringing the number of species up to 50.

== Description ==
Erythrolamprus snakes are usually less than 1.6 m (5.2 ft) in length. They are ground snakes, with lifestyles ranging from fossorial (burrowing) to terrestrial to semi-aquatic, and in habitats ranging from rainforests to savannas to the mountainous páramo, up to 3,500 m (11,500 ft) above sea level.

== Species ==
These species are currently recognized as being valid.

- Erythrolamprus aenigma Entiauspe-Neto, Abegg, Koch, Nuñez, Azevedo, Moraes, Tiutenko, Bialves & Loebmann, 2021 – savannah racer snake
- Erythrolamprus aesculapii (Linnaeus, 1766) – Aesculapian false coral snake
- Erythrolamprus albertguentheri Grazziotin, Zaher, R. Murphy, Scrocchi, Benavides, Zhang & Bonatto, 2012 – Günther's green liophis
- Erythrolamprus albiventris (Jan, 1863)
- Erythrolamprus almadensis (Wagler, 1824) – Almaden ground snake
- Erythrolamprus andinus (Dixon, 1983)
- Erythrolamprus atraventer (Dixon & Thomas, 1985) – Dixon's ground snake
- Erythrolamprus bizona Jan, 1863 – double-banded false coral snake
- Erythrolamprus breviceps (Cope, 1861) – short ground snake
- Erythrolamprus carajasensis (da Cunha, Nascimento & Ávila-Pires, 1985)
- Erythrolamprus ceii (Dixon, 1991)
- Erythrolamprus cobella (Linnaeus, 1758) – mangrove snake
- Erythrolamprus cursor (Lacépède, 1789) – Lacépède's ground snake or Martinique ground snake (possibly extinct)
- Erythrolamprus dorsocorallinus (Esqueda, Natera, La Marca & Ilija-Fistar, 2007)
- Erythrolamprus epinephalus (Cope, 1862) – fire-bellied snake
- Erythrolamprus festae (Peracca, 1897) – drab ground snake
- Erythrolamprus fraseri Boulenger, 1894
- Erythrolamprus frenatus (F. Werner, 1909) – swamp liophis
- Erythrolamprus guentheri Garman, 1883 – Günther's false coral snake
- Erythrolamprus ingeri (Roze, 1958)
- Erythrolamprus jaegeri (Günther, 1858) – Jaeger's ground snake
- Erythrolamprus janaleeae (Dixon, 2000)
- Erythrolamprus juliae (Cope, 1879) – Julia's ground snake
- Erythrolamprus lamonae (Dunn, 1944)
- Erythrolamprus macrosomus (Amaral, 1936)
- Erythrolamprus maryellenae (Dixon, 1985) – Maryellen's ground snake
- Erythrolamprus melanotus (Shaw, 1802) – Shaw's dark ground snake
- Erythrolamprus mertensi (Roze, 1964) – Mertens's tropical forest snake
- Erythrolamprus miliaris (Linnaeus, 1758) – military ground snake
- Erythrolamprus mimus (Cope, 1868) – mimic false coral snake
- Erythrolamprus mossoroensis (Hoge & Lima-Verde, 1973)
- Erythrolamprus ocellatus W. Peters, 1868 – Tobago false coral snake, red snake
- Erythrolamprus oligolepis (Boulenger, 1905)
- Erythrolamprus ornatus (Garman, 1887) – Saint Lucia racer, ornate ground snake
- †Erythrolamprus perfuscus (Cope, 1862) – tan ground snake, Barbados racer (extinct)
- Erythrolamprus poecilogyrus (Wied-Neuwied, 1825)
- Erythrolamprus pseudocorallus Roze, 1959 – false coral snake
- Erythrolamprus pseudoreginae J. Murphy, Braswell, Charles, Auguste, Rivas, Borzée, Lehtinen & Jowers, 2019 – Tobago stream snake
- Erythrolamprus pyburni (Markezich & Dixon, 1979) – Pyburn's tropical forest snake
- Erythrolamprus pygmaeus (Cope, 1868) – Amazon tropical forest snake
- Erythrolamprus reginae (Linnaeus, 1758) – royal ground snake
- Erythrolamprus rochai Ascenso, Costa & Prudente, 2019
- Erythrolamprus sagittifer (Jan, 1863) – arrow ground snake
- Erythrolamprus semiaureus (Cope, 1862)
- Erythrolamprus subocularis (Boulenger, 1902)
- Erythrolamprus taeniogaster (Jan, 1866)
- Erythrolamprus taeniurus (Tschudi, 1845) – thin ground snake
- Erythrolamprus torrenicola (Donnelly & C. Myers, 1991) – velvety swamp snake
- Erythrolamprus trebbaui (Roze, 1958)
- Erythrolamprus triscalis (Linnaeus, 1758) – three-scaled ground snake
- Erythrolamprus typhlus (Linnaeus, 1758) – blind ground snake, velvet swamp snake
- Erythrolamprus viridis (Günther, 1862) – crown ground snake
- Erythrolamprus vitti (Dixon, 2000)
- Erythrolamprus williamsi (Roze, 1958) – Williams' ground snake
- Erythrolamprus zweifeli (Roze, 1959) – braided ground snake, Zweifel's ground snake

Nota bene: A binomial authority in parentheses indicates that the species was originally described in a genus other than Erythrolamprus.

== Mimicry ==
The brightly colored, ringed patterns of some of the snakes of the genus Erythrolamprus resemble those of sympatric coral snakes of the genus Micrurus, and it has been suggested that this is due to mimicry. Whether this is classical Batesian mimicry, classical Müllerian mimicry, a modified form of Müllerian mimicry, or no mimicry at all, remains to be proven.
