= Erythrolamprus albertguentheri =

Conservation status
- Least Concern (IUCN 3.1)

Scientific classification
- Kingdom: Animalia
- Phylum: Chordata
- Class: Reptilia
- Order: Squamata
- Suborder: Serpentes
- Family: Colubridae
- Genus: Erythrolamprus
- Species: E. albertguentheri

Binomial name
- Erythrolamprus albertguentheri Grazziotin, Zaher, R. Murphy, Scrocchi, Benavides, Zhang & Bonatto, 2012

Synonyms
- Liophis guentheri Peracca, 1897; Leimadophis guentheri — Serié, 1921; Liophis guentheri — Cei, 1993; Erythrolamprus albertguentheri Grazziotin et al., 2012 (nomen substitutum)

Species of snake

Erythrolamprus albertguentheri, also known commonly as Günther's green liophis, is a species of snake in the subfamily Dipsadinae of the family Colubridae. The species is native to central South America.

== Etymology ==
The specific name, albertguentheri, is in honor of German-British herpetologist Albert Günther.

== Geographic range ==
E. albertguentheri is found in northern Argentina, southern Bolivia, and western Paraguay.

== Habitat ==
The preferred natural habitats of E. albertguentheri are forest and savanna.

== Description ==
Dorsally, E. albertguentheri is uniformly grass green; ventrally it is yellowish white.

== Reproduction ==
E. albertguentheri is oviparous.

== Taxonomy ==
Erythrolamprus albertguentheri was originally described as Liophis guentheri by Peracca in 1897. Studies by Grazziotin et al. in 2012 found that the species should be reassigned to the genus Erythrolamprus. However, the scientific name Erythrolamprus guentheri was preoccupied by another Erythrolamprus guentheri which had been described by Garman in 1883. Therefore, Grazziotin et al. created the replacement name Erythrolamprus albertguentheri so as to differentiate the two species while maintaining the homage to Günther which Peracca had intended.
