= Erythrolamprus ocellatus =

Conservation status
- Least Concern (IUCN 3.1)

Scientific classification
- Kingdom: Animalia
- Phylum: Chordata
- Class: Reptilia
- Order: Squamata
- Suborder: Serpentes
- Family: Colubridae
- Subfamily: Dipsadinae
- Genus: Erythrolamprus
- Species: E. ocellatus

Binomial name
- Erythrolamprus ocellatus W. Peters, 1868

Synonyms
- Erythrolamprus aesculapii ocellatus Peters, 1868

Species of snake

Erythrolamprus ocellatus, commonly known as the Tobago false coral snake, red snake, or doctor snake is a species of colubrid snake, which is endemic to the island of Tobago (in the Republic of Trinidad and Tobago).

== Classification ==
Erythrolamprus ocellatus belongs to the genus Erythrolamprus, which contains over 50 species. The genus Erythrolamprus belongs to the subfamily Dipsadinae, which is sometimes referred to as the family Dipsadidae. The relationships of Erythrolamprus species located in northern South America (Venezuela) can be shown in the cladogram below, based on molecular DNA analysis:

- - E. poecilogyrus (paraphyletic)
  - - E. ceii
    - E. poecilogyrus (paraphyletic)
- - E. miliaris
  - E. miliaris
  - - - E. typhlus (Brazil) (paraphyletic)
      - - E. reginae (paraphyletic)
        - - E. reginae (paraphyletic)
          - E. zweifeli
    - - E. breviceps
      - E. epinephalus (Peru) (paraphyletic)
      - - - E. epinephalus (Costa Rica) (paraphyletic)
          - E. pseudoreginae
        - E. melanotus
  - - - E. atraventer
      - - E. jaegeri
        - E. almadensis
    - - - E. juliae
        - E. cursor
      - E. typhlus (French Guiana) (paraphyletic)
    - - E. cobella
      - - - E. aesculapii (Brazil) (paraphyletic)
          - Erythrolamprus ocellatus
        - - E. aesculapii (French Guiana & Guyana) (paraphyletic)
          - - E. bizona
            - E. mimus

== Description ==
Unlike other Erythrolamprus false coral snake species, E. ocellatus is not sympatric with coral snakes, and has a spotted rather than a banded pattern. Dorsally, it is reddish (with black scale tips), and has a series of about 25 large ocelli (round black spots with light centers) running down the middle of the back. It is considered to be an imperfect mimic of a coral snake, keeping in mind that there are no extant species of coral snakes in Tobago. The dorsal surfaces of the head and neck are black, and the tail is ringed with black.

== Geographic Range, Habitat and Activity ==
The species is a Tobago endemic, known only from the wetter northeastern and central parts of the island. It utilizes leaf-litter and is perhaps also fossorial in rainforest, forest edge and cacao plantation habitats. It seems to be most active in the early morning and late afternoon.

== Diet ==
It probably feeds on other snakes.
