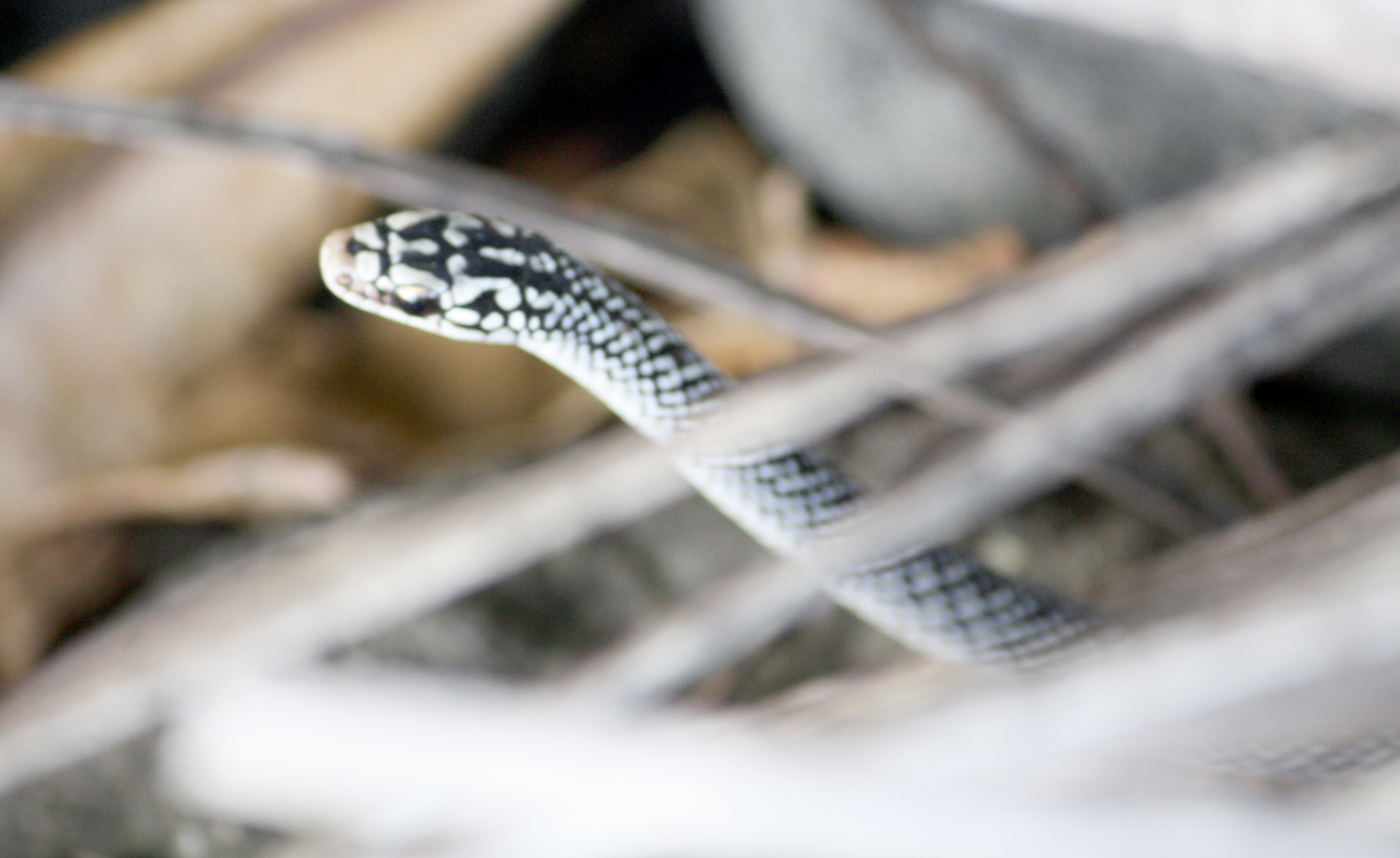
- In Rosalie, Dominica

Conservation status
- Near Threatened (IUCN 3.1)

Scientific classification
- Kingdom: Animalia
- Phylum: Chordata
- Class: Reptilia
- Order: Squamata
- Suborder: Serpentes
- Family: Colubridae
- Subfamily: Dipsadinae
- Genus: Erythrolamprus
- Species: E. juliae

Binomial name
- Erythrolamprus juliae (Cope, 1879)

Synonyms
- Aporophis juliae Cope, 1879; Acrophis juliae — Cope, 1879; Dromicus juliae — Garman, 1887; Liophis juliae — Günther, 1888; Leimadophis mariae Barbour, 1914; Erythrolamprus juliae — Grazziotin et al., 2012; Liophis juliae — Wallach, 2014

= Julia's ground snake =

Species of snake

Julia's ground snake (Erythrolamprus juliae) is a species of snake in the subfamily Dipsadinae of the family Colubridae. The species is found in the Caribbean, on the Lesser Antilles islands of Dominica and Guadeloupe. There are three subspecies.

== Etymology ==
The specific name, juliae, is in honor of Julia Cope Collins (1866–1959), who was the only child of American herpetologist Edward Drinker Cope, the describer of this species.

== Classification ==
Erythrolamprus juliae belongs to the genus Erythrolamprus, which contains over 50 species. The genus Erythrolamprus belongs to the subfamily Dipsadinae, which is sometimes referred to as the family Dipsadidae. The relationships of Erythrolamprus species located in northern South America can be shown in the cladogram below, based on molecular DNA analysis:

- - E. poecilogyrus (paraphyletic)
  - - E. ceii
    - E. poecilogyrus (paraphyletic)
- - E. miliaris
  - E. miliaris
  - - - E. typhlus (Brazil) (paraphyletic)
      - - E. reginae (paraphyletic)
        - - E. reginae (paraphyletic)
          - E. zweifeli
    - - E. breviceps
      - E. epinephalus (Peru) (paraphyletic)
      - - - E. epinephalus (Costa Rica) (paraphyletic)
          - E. pseudoreginae
        - E. melanotus
  - - - E. atraventer
      - - E. jaegeri
        - E. almadensis
    - - - Erythrolamprus juliae
        - E. cursor
      - E. typhlus (French Guiana) (paraphyletic)
    - - E. cobella
      - - - E. aesculapii (Brazil) (paraphyletic)
          - E. ocellatus
        - - E. aesculapii (French Guiana & Guyana) (paraphyletic)
          - - E. bizona
            - E. mimus

=== Subspecies ===
The following three subspecies have been described.

- Erythrolamprus juliae copeae (Parker, 1936)
- Erythrolamprus juliae juliae (Cope, 1879)
- Erythrolamprus juliae mariae (Barbour, 1914)

The nominate subspecies, E. j. juliae, is endemic to Dominica, where it may be found everywhere but the highest elevations. E. j. copeae is found on numerous islands in the Guadeloupean archipelago, while E. j. mariae is restricted to the Guadeloupean island of Marie-Galante.

The relative rareness of this species in Guadeloupe is attributed to the presence of the mongoose, which is absent from Dominica.

Nota bene: A trinomial authority in parentheses indicates that the subspecies was originally described in a genus other than Erythrolamprus.

== Description ==
E. juliae can reach half a meter (20 inches) in total length (including tail). Its coloration is typically white or yellowish flecks on a glossy dark ground color, but some individuals are uniformly dark.

== Diet ==
Julia's ground snake preys upon insects, frogs, and lizards.

== Defensive behavior ==
E. juliae is harmless to humans, but may release a foul-smelling cloacal secretion if provoked.
