= Liophis =

Genus of snakes

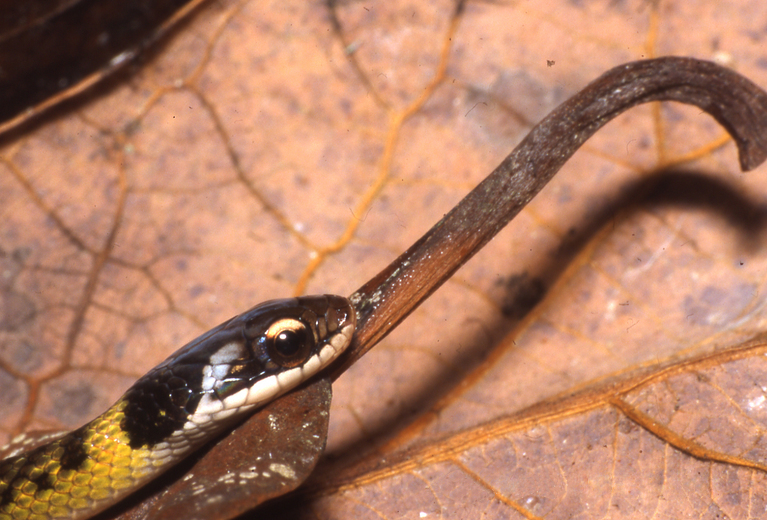
Liophis reginae

Liophis is a former genus of New World colubrid snakes. They have a wide range of nondescript and local names, among these "water snakes", "mapepires", "corals" or "racers".

== Taxonomy and systematics ==
The status of the genus Liophis on the mainland of South America is highly uncertain, and some authorities assign some species to the genera Dromicus, Erythrolamprus, Leimadophis, Lygophis, and Philodryas. Others consider Dromicus and Leimadophis to be synonyms of Liophis.
