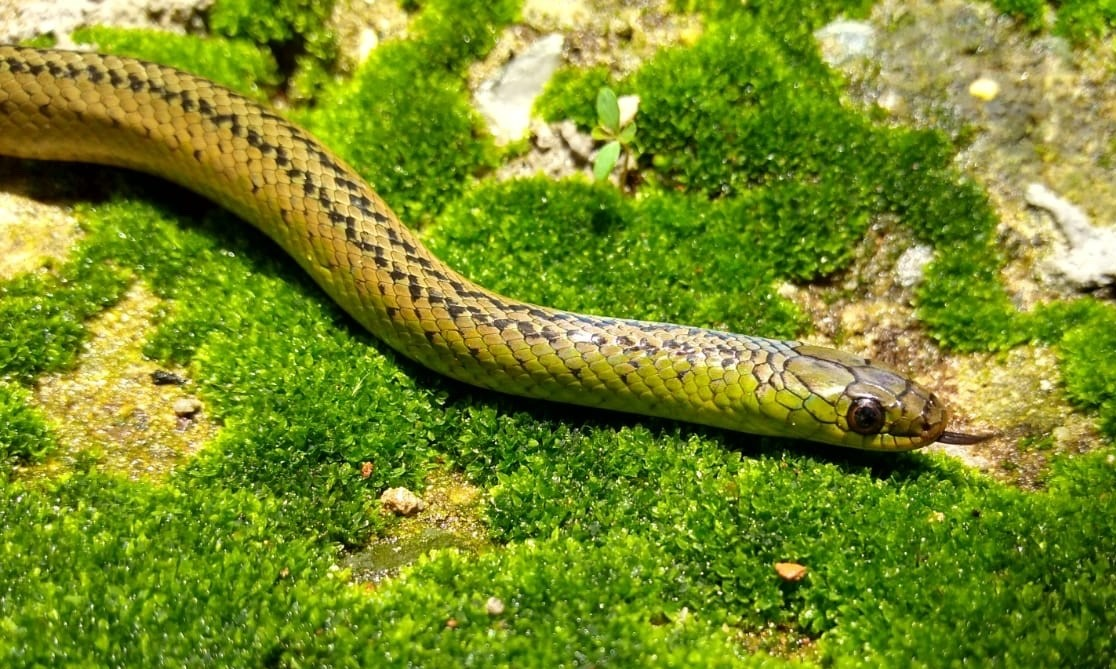

Conservation status
- Least Concern (IUCN 3.1)

Scientific classification
- Kingdom: Animalia
- Phylum: Chordata
- Class: Reptilia
- Order: Squamata
- Suborder: Serpentes
- Family: Colubridae
- Genus: Erythrolamprus
- Species: E. maryellenae

Binomial name
- Erythrolamprus maryellenae (Dixon, 1985)

= Erythrolamprus maryellenae =

Species of snake

Erythrolamprus maryellenae, commonly known as Maryellen's ground snake, is a species of snake in the family Colubridae. The species is found in Brazil.
