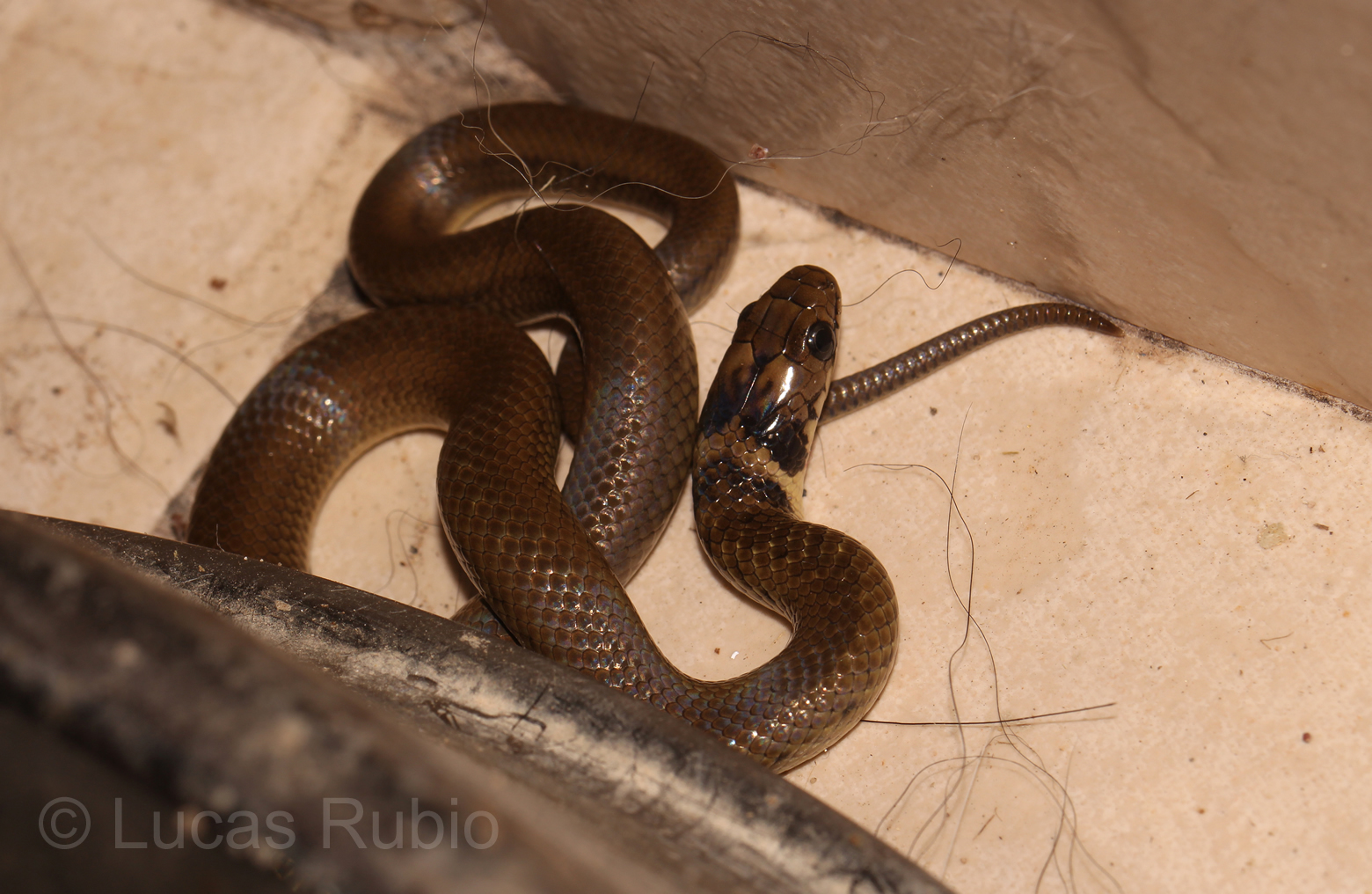
- Erythrolamprus semiaureus

Conservation status
- Least Concern (IUCN 3.1)

Scientific classification
- Kingdom: Animalia
- Phylum: Chordata
- Class: Reptilia
- Order: Squamata
- Suborder: Serpentes
- Family: Colubridae
- Genus: Erythrolamprus
- Species: E. semiaureus

Binomial name
- Erythrolamprus semiaureus (Cope, 1862)

= Erythrolamprus semiaureus =

Species of snake

Erythrolamprus semiaureus is a species of snake in the family Colubridae. The species is found in Paraguay, Argentina, Brazil, and Uruguay.
