= Erythrolamprus frenatus =

Conservation status
- Least Concern (IUCN 3.1)

Scientific classification
- Kingdom: Animalia
- Phylum: Chordata
- Class: Reptilia
- Order: Squamata
- Suborder: Serpentes
- Family: Colubridae
- Genus: Erythrolamprus
- Species: E. frenatus

Binomial name
- Erythrolamprus frenatus (Werner, 1909)

Species of snake

Erythrolamprus frenatus, the swamp liophis, is a species of snake in the family Colubridae. The species is found in Brazil, Paraguay, and Argentina.
