= Erythrolamprus oligolepis =

Conservation status
- Least Concern (IUCN 3.1)

Scientific classification
- Kingdom: Animalia
- Phylum: Chordata
- Class: Reptilia
- Order: Squamata
- Suborder: Serpentes
- Family: Colubridae
- Genus: Erythrolamprus
- Species: E. oligolepis

Binomial name
- Erythrolamprus oligolepis (Boulenger, 1905)

Species of snake

Erythrolamprus oligolepis is a species of snake in the family Colubridae. The species is found in Brazil, Venezuela, and Peru.
