= Erythrolamprus albiventris =

Scientific classification
- Kingdom: Animalia
- Phylum: Chordata
- Class: Reptilia
- Order: Squamata
- Suborder: Serpentes
- Family: Colubridae
- Genus: Erythrolamprus
- Species: E. albiventris

Binomial name
- Erythrolamprus albiventris (Jan, 1863)

Species of snake

Erythrolamprus albiventris is a species of snake in the family Colubridae. The species is found in Ecuador and Colombia.
