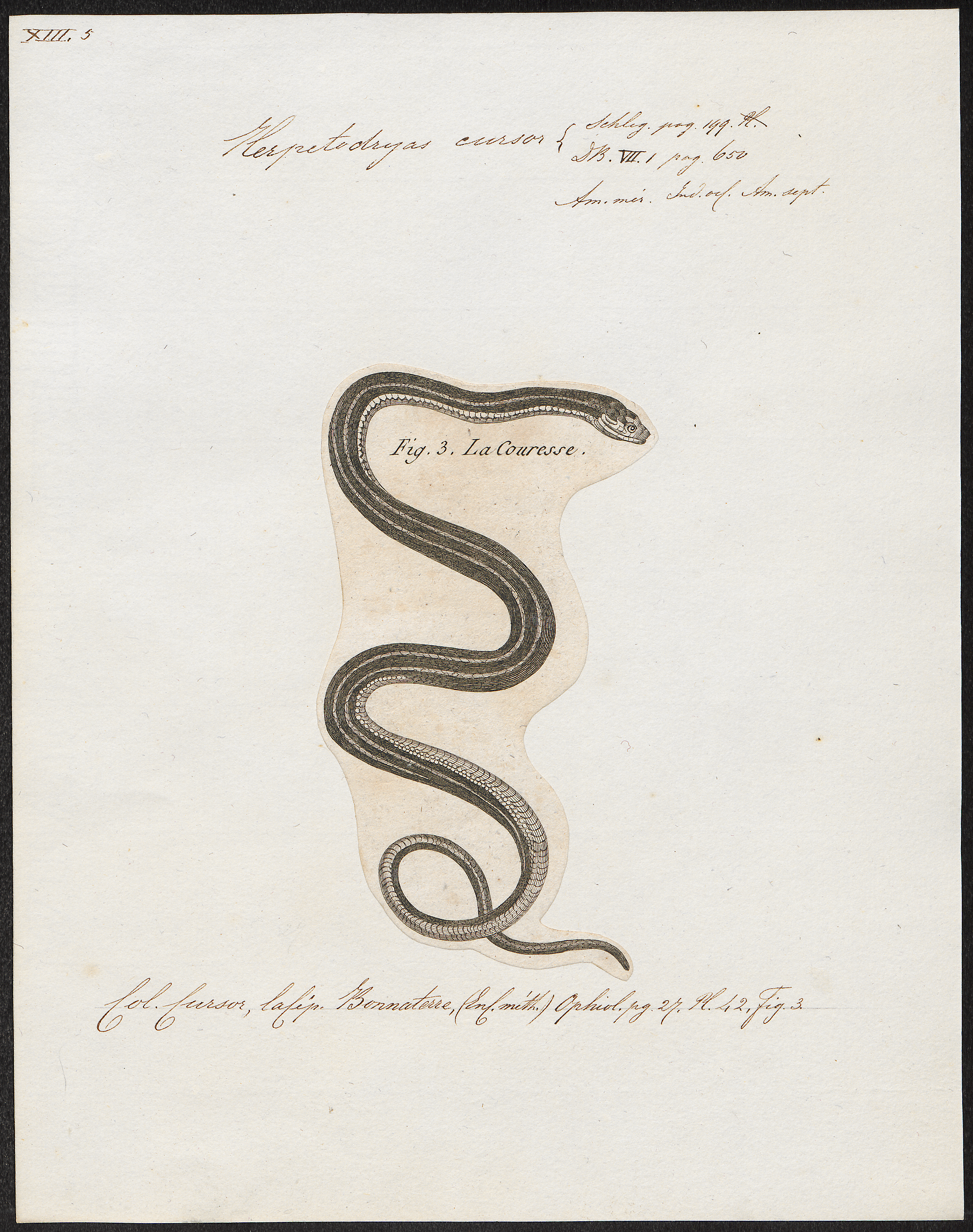

Conservation status
- Critically endangered, possibly extinct (IUCN 2.3)

Scientific classification
- Kingdom: Animalia
- Phylum: Chordata
- Class: Reptilia
- Order: Squamata
- Suborder: Serpentes
- Family: Colubridae
- Subfamily: Dipsadinae
- Genus: Erythrolamprus
- Species: E. cursor

Binomial name
- Erythrolamprus cursor (Lacépède, 1789)

Synonyms
- Coluber cursor Lacépède, 1789; Herpetodryas cursor (Lacépède, 1789); Dromicus cursor (Lacépède, 1789); Liophis cursor (Lacépède, 1789); Erythrolamprus cursor (Lacépède, 1789)

= Lacépède's ground snake =

Species of snake

Lacépède's ground snake (Erythrolamprus cursor), also known as the Martinique ground snake or Martinique racer, is a possibly extinct species of snake in the Colubridae family. It is endemic to Caribbean island of Martinique. Little is known of it scientifically, and few photographs exist.

== Taxonomy ==
Lacépède's ground snake was first formally described as Coluber cursor in 1789 by the French naturalist Bernard-Germain-Étienne de La Ville-sur-Illon, comte de Lacépède with its type locality given as Martinique. This species is now classified within the genus Erythrolamprus, which contains over 50 species. The genus Erythrolamprus belongs to the subfamily Dipsadinae, which is sometimes referred to as the family Dipsadidae. The relationships of Erythrolamprus species located in northern South America can be shown in the cladogram below, based on molecular DNA analysis:

- - E. poecilogyrus (paraphyletic)
  - - E. ceii
    - E. poecilogyrus (paraphyletic)
- - E. miliaris
  - E. miliaris
  - - - E. typhlus (Brazil) (paraphyletic)
      - - E. reginae (paraphyletic)
        - - E. reginae (paraphyletic)
          - E. zweifeli
    - - E. breviceps
      - E. epinephalus (Peru) (paraphyletic)
      - - - E. epinephalus (Costa Rica) (paraphyletic)
          - E. pseudoreginae
        - E. melanotus
  - - - E. atraventer
      - - E. jaegeri
        - E. almadensis
    - - - E. juliae
        - Erythrolamprus cursor
      - E. typhlus (French Guiana) (paraphyletic)
    - - E. cobella
      - - - E. aesculapii (Brazil) (paraphyletic)
          - E. ocellatus
        - - E. aesculapii (French Guiana & Guyana) (paraphyletic)
          - - E. bizona
            - E. mimus

== Distribution ==
Lacépède's ground snake was endemic to Martinque in the Lesser Antilles, it was thought to be extinct until it was rediscovered on the small satellite island of Diamond Rock in 1962 by James D. Lazell Jr.

== Conservation status ==
Lacépède's ground snake was last recorded on Martinique in 1965. The introduction of small Indian Mongoose to Martinique is attributed to decimating the snake's population. The last sighting of the snake on Diamond Rock was in 1968 and there have been no further sightings of this species since then. A survey was conducted in 2015 on Diamond Rock, and researchers were unable to locate any Lacépède's ground snake as the rocky and steep terrain of the island made many areas difficult to access. With no confirmed sightings after the survey, the scientists concluded that the snake is possibly extinct.
