= Erythrolamprus fraseri =

Scientific classification
- Kingdom: Animalia
- Phylum: Chordata
- Class: Reptilia
- Order: Squamata
- Suborder: Serpentes
- Family: Colubridae
- Genus: Erythrolamprus
- Species: E. fraseri

Binomial name
- Erythrolamprus fraseri (Boulenger, 1894)

Synonyms
- Liophis fraseri Boulenger, 1894; Leimadophis fraseri — Amaral, 1929; Liophis epinephelus [sic] fraseri — Dixon, 1983; Liophis fraseri — Vanzolini in J. Peters & Orejas-Miranda, 1986; Erythrolamprus fraseri — Torres-Carvajal & Hinojosa, 2020

Species of snake

Erythrolamprus fraseri is a species of snake in the family Colubridae. The species is native to northwestern South America.

== Etymology ==
The specific name, fraseri, is in honor of British zoologist Louis Fraser.

== Geographic range ==
E. fraseri is found in western Ecuador and in Huancabamba Province, Peru.

== Description ==
The holotype of E. fraseri, an adult female, has a snout-vent length (SVL) of 54 cm (21 in), plus a tail length of 15 cm (5.9 in).

== Reproduction ==
E. fraseri is oviparous.
