= Erythrolamprus macrosomus =

Scientific classification
- Kingdom: Animalia
- Phylum: Chordata
- Class: Reptilia
- Order: Squamata
- Suborder: Serpentes
- Family: Colubridae
- Genus: Erythrolamprus
- Species: E. macrosomus

Binomial name
- Erythrolamprus macrosomus (Amaral, 1936)

Species of snake

Erythrolamprus macrosomus is a species of snake in the family Colubridae. The species is found in Brazil, Argentina, and Paraguay.
