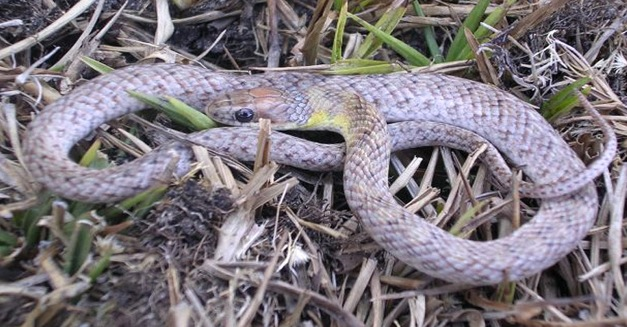

Conservation status
- Least Concern (IUCN 3.1)

Scientific classification
- Kingdom: Animalia
- Phylum: Chordata
- Class: Reptilia
- Order: Squamata
- Suborder: Serpentes
- Family: Colubridae
- Subfamily: Dipsadinae
- Genus: Erythrolamprus
- Species: E. poecilogyrus

Binomial name
- Erythrolamprus poecilogyrus (Wied-Neuwied, 1824)

= Erythrolamprus poecilogyrus =

Species of snake

Erythrolamprus poecilogyrus is a species of snake in the family Colubridae. The species is found in Argentina, Uruguay, Brazil, Venezuela, Bolivia, Guyana, Paraguay, and Peru.

== Classification ==
Erythrolamprus poecilogyrus belongs to the genus Erythrolamprus, which contains over 50 species. The genus Erythrolamprus belongs to the subfamily Dipsadinae, which is sometimes referred to as the family Dipsadidae.

Recent phylogenetic analysis of morphological and molecular DNA evidence has shown that Erythrolamprus poecilogyrus is now likely paraphyletic.

The relationships of Erythrolamprus species located in northern South America can be shown in the cladogram below:

- - Erythrolamprus poecilogyrus (paraphyletic)
  - - E. ceii
    - Erythrolamprus poecilogyrus (paraphyletic)
- - E. miliaris
  - E. miliaris
  - - - E. typhlus (Brazil) (paraphyletic)
      - - E. reginae (paraphyletic)
        - - E. reginae (paraphyletic)
          - E. zweifeli
    - - E. breviceps
      - E. epinephalus (Peru) (paraphyletic)
      - - - E. epinephalus (Costa Rica) (paraphyletic)
          - E. pseudoreginae
        - E. melanotus
  - - - E. atraventer
      - - E. jaegeri
        - E. almadensis
    - - - E. juliae
        - E. cursor
      - E. typhlus (French Guiana) (paraphyletic)
    - - E. cobella
      - - - E. aesculapii (Brazil) (paraphyletic)
          - E. ocellatus
        - - E. aesculapii (French Guiana & Guyana) (paraphyletic)
          - - E. bizona
            - E. mimus
