= Erythrolamprus janaleeae =

Conservation status
- Least Concern (IUCN 3.1)

Scientific classification
- Kingdom: Animalia
- Phylum: Chordata
- Class: Reptilia
- Order: Squamata
- Suborder: Serpentes
- Family: Colubridae
- Genus: Erythrolamprus
- Species: E. janaleeae

Binomial name
- Erythrolamprus janaleeae (Dixon, 2000)

Synonyms
- Liophis janaleeae Dixon, 2000; Erythrolamprus janaleeae — Grazziotin et al., 2012

Species of snake

Erythrolamprus janaleeae is a species of snake in the subfamily Dipsadinae of the family Colubridae. The species is endemic to Peru.

== Etymology ==
The specific name, janaleeae, is in honor of American herpetologist Janalee Paige Caldwell.

== Geographic range ==
E. janaleeae is found on the eastern slopes of the Peruvian Andes.

== Habitat ==
The preferred natural habitat of E. janaleeae is forest, at altitudes of 854–2,700 m (2,800–8,860 ft).

== Description ==
E. janaleeae has smooth dorsal scales, each with one apical pit. The dorsal scales are in 17 rows at the neck and at midbody, but reduced to 15 rows on the posterior body.

== Reproduction ==
E. janaleeae is oviparous.
