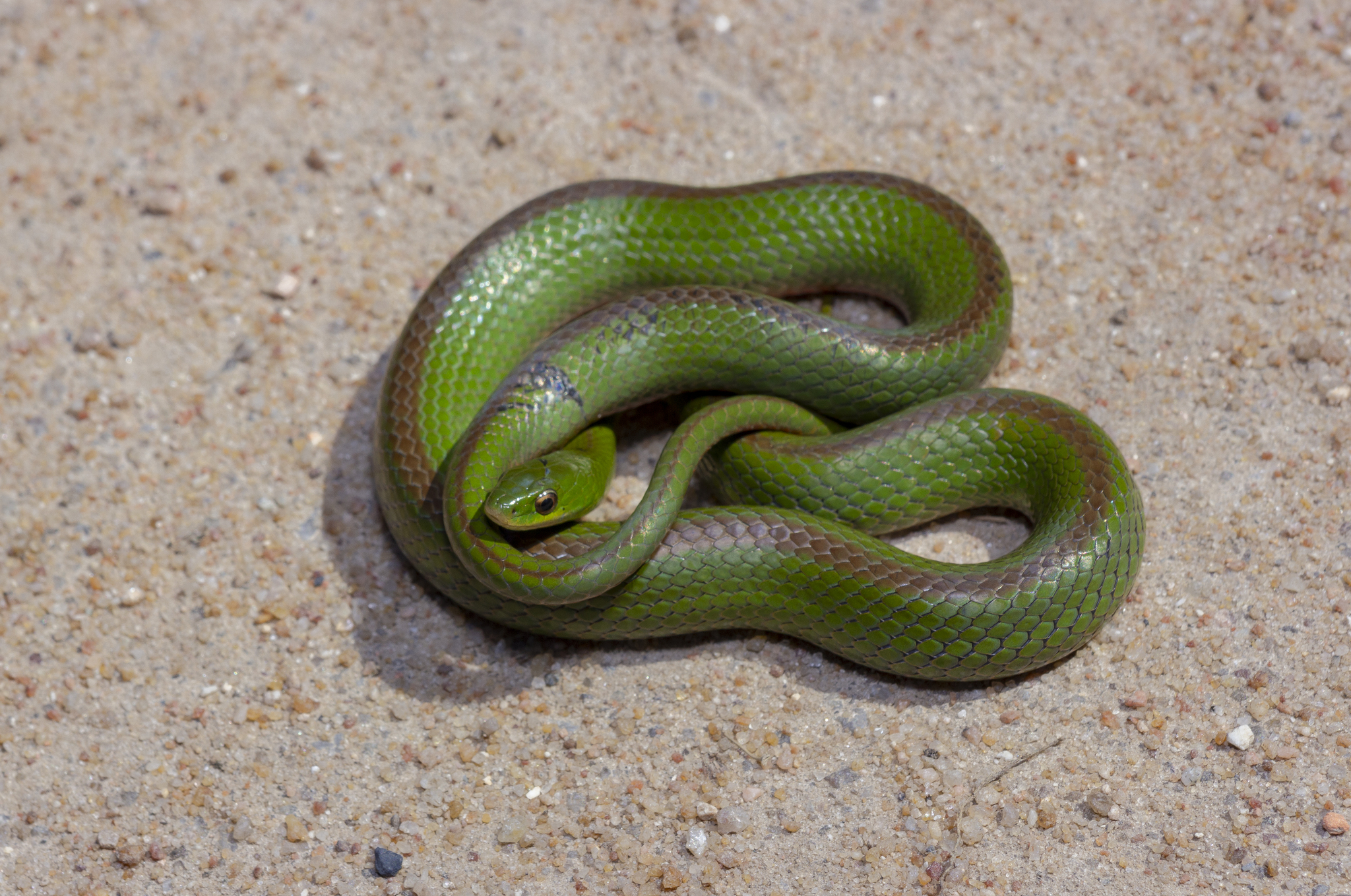

Conservation status
- Least Concern (IUCN 3.1)

Scientific classification
- Kingdom: Animalia
- Phylum: Chordata
- Class: Reptilia
- Order: Squamata
- Suborder: Serpentes
- Family: Colubridae
- Genus: Erythrolamprus
- Species: E. jaegeri

Binomial name
- Erythrolamprus jaegeri (Günther, 1858)

Synonyms
- Coronella jaegeri Günther, 1858; Liophis jaegeri — Freiberg, 1982; Erthrolamprus jaegeri — Forlani et al., 2010

= Erythrolamprus jaegeri =

Species of snake

Erythrolamprus jaegeri, commonly known as Jaeger's ground snake, is a species of snake in the subfamily Dipsadinae of the family Colubridae. The species is native to South America. There are two recognized subspecies.

== Etymology ==
The specific name, jaegeri, is in honor of German paleontologist Georg Friedrich Jäger.

== Geographic range ==
Erythrolamprus jaegeri is found in Argentina, Brazil, Paraguay, and Uruguay.

== Habitat ==
Erythrolamprus jaegeri is found in a variety of habitats, including forest, shrubland, grassland, and freshwater wetlands, at altitudes from near sea level to 1,300 m (4,270 ft).

== Classification ==
Erythrolamprus jaegeri belongs to the genus Erythrolamprus, which contains over 50 species. The genus Erythrolamprus belongs to the subfamily Dipsadinae, which is sometimes referred to as the family Dipsadidae. The relationships of Erythrolamprus species located in northern South America can be shown in the cladogram below, based on molecular DNA analysis:

- - E. poecilogyrus (paraphyletic)
  - - E. ceii
    - E. poecilogyrus (paraphyletic)
- - E. miliaris
  - E. miliaris
  - - - E. typhlus (Brazil) (paraphyletic)
      - - E. reginae (paraphyletic)
        - - E. reginae (paraphyletic)
          - E. zweifeli
    - - E. breviceps
      - E. epinephalus (Peru) (paraphyletic)
      - - - E. epinephalus (Costa Rica) (paraphyletic)
          - E. pseudoreginae
        - E. melanotus
  - - - E. atraventer
      - - Erythrolamprus jaegeri
        - E. almadensis
    - - - E. juliae
        - E. cursor
      - E. typhlus (French Guiana) (paraphyletic)
    - - E. cobella
      - - - E. aesculapii (Brazil) (paraphyletic)
          - E. ocellatus
        - - E. aesculapii (French Guiana & Guyana) (paraphyletic)
          - - E. bizona
            - E. mimus

== Reproduction ==
Erythrolamprus jaegeri is oviparous.

== Subspecies ==
Two subspecies are recognized as being valid, including the nominotypical subspecies.

- Erythrolamprus jaegeri coralliventris (Boulenger, 1894)
- Erythrolamprus jaegeri jaegeri (Günther, 1858)

Nota bene: A trinomial authority in parentheses indicates that the subspecies was originally described in a genus other than Erythrolamprus.
