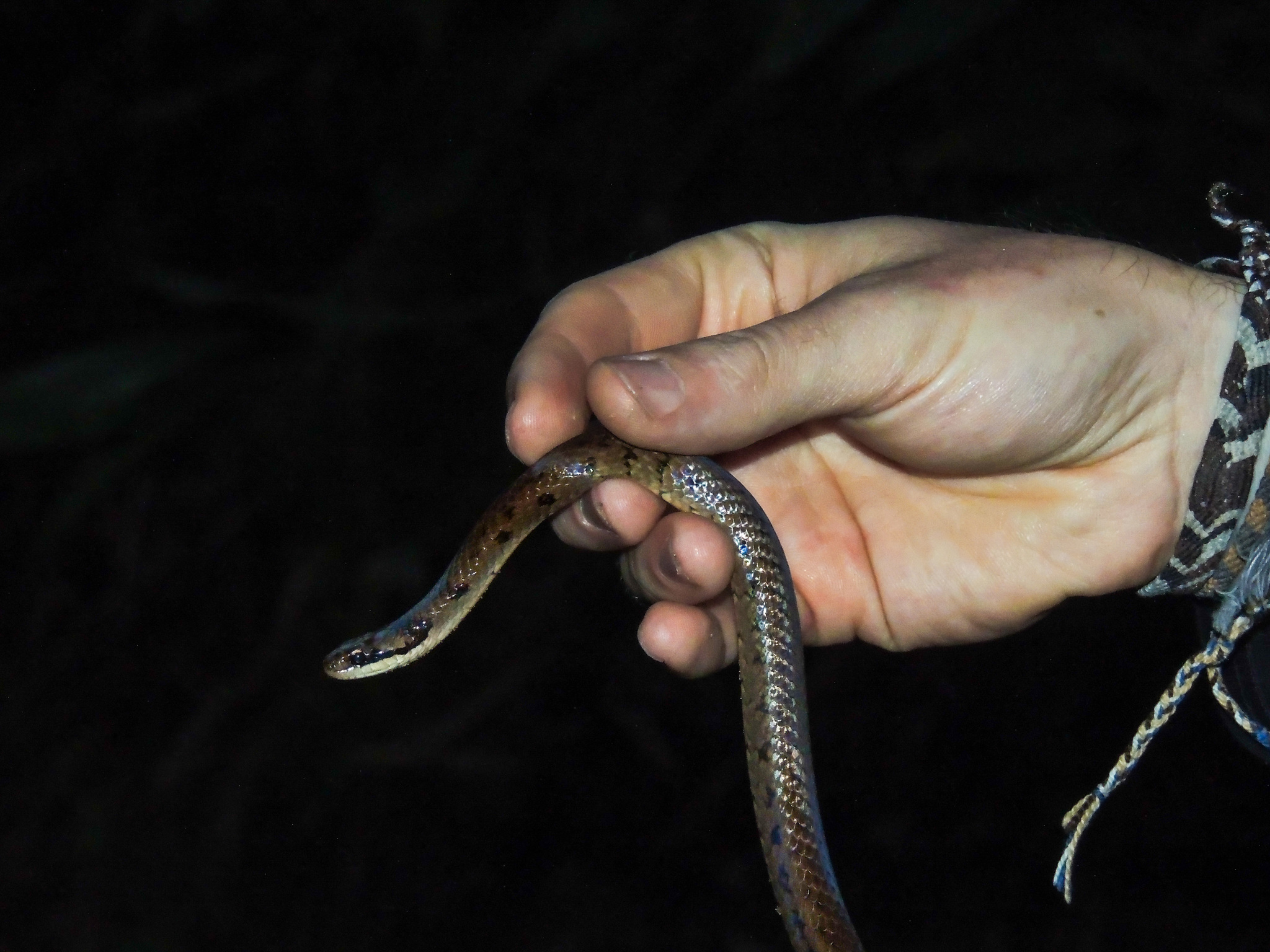
- Erythrolamprus taeniurus

Conservation status
- Least Concern (IUCN 3.1)

Scientific classification
- Kingdom: Animalia
- Phylum: Chordata
- Class: Reptilia
- Order: Squamata
- Suborder: Serpentes
- Family: Colubridae
- Genus: Erythrolamprus
- Species: E. taeniurus

Binomial name
- Erythrolamprus taeniurus (Tschudi, 1845)

= Erythrolamprus taeniurus =

Species of snake

Erythrolamprus taeniurus, the thin ground snake, is a species of snake in the family Colubridae. The species is found in Colombia, Peru, and Bolivia.
