= Erythrolamprus pygmaeus =

Scientific classification
- Kingdom: Animalia
- Phylum: Chordata
- Class: Reptilia
- Order: Squamata
- Suborder: Serpentes
- Family: Colubridae
- Genus: Erythrolamprus
- Species: E. pygmaeus

Binomial name
- Erythrolamprus pygmaeus (Cope, 1868)

Species of snake

Erythrolamprus pygmaeus, the Amazon tropical forest snake, is a species of snake in the family Colubridae. The species is found in Ecuador, Peru, Brazil, Venezuela, and Colombia.
