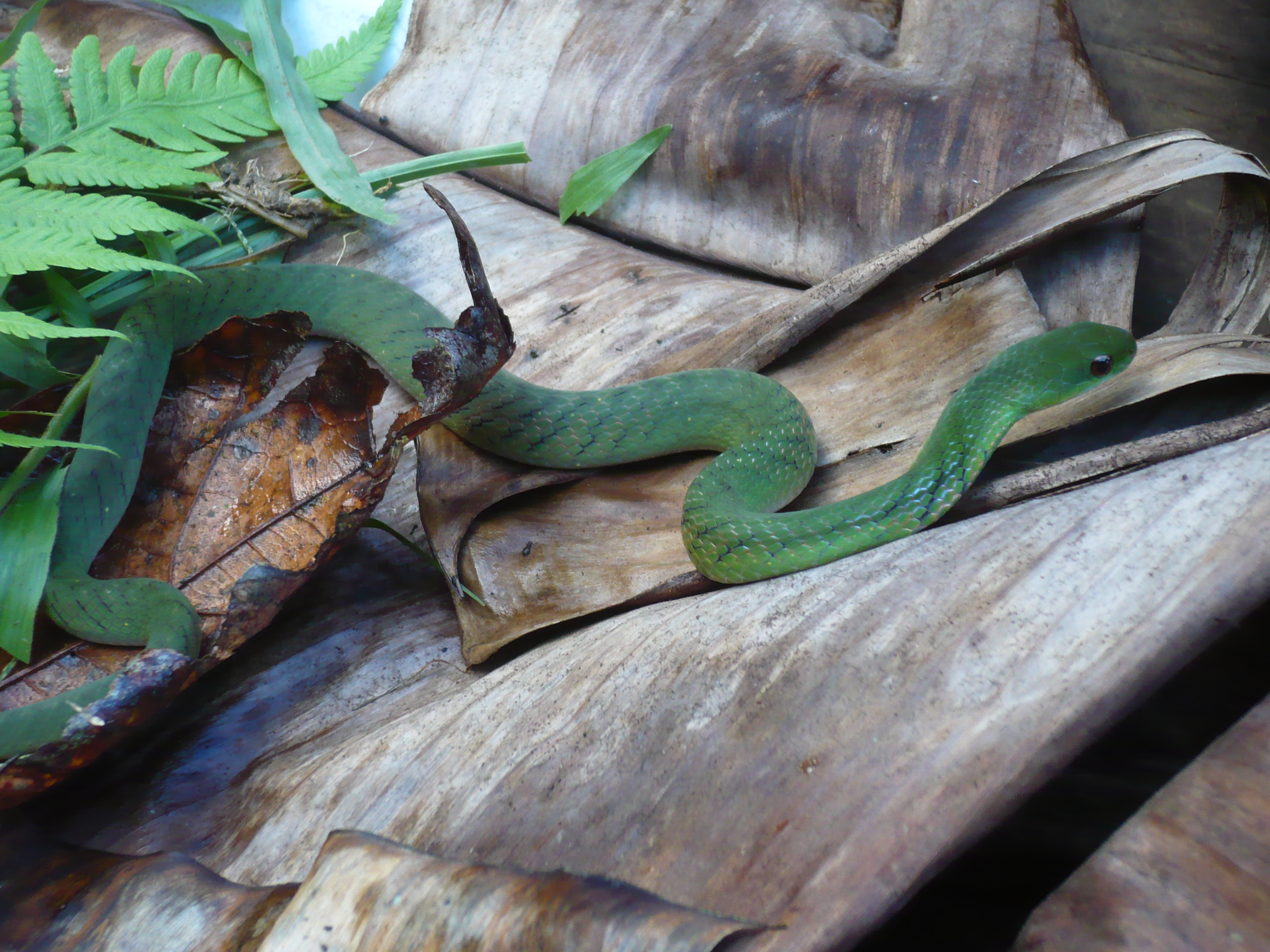

Conservation status
- Least Concern (IUCN 3.1)

Scientific classification
- Kingdom: Animalia
- Phylum: Chordata
- Class: Reptilia
- Order: Squamata
- Suborder: Serpentes
- Family: Colubridae
- Subfamily: Dipsadinae
- Genus: Erythrolamprus
- Species: E. typhlus

Binomial name
- Erythrolamprus typhlus (Linnaeus, 1758)

= Erythrolamprus typhlus =

Blind ground snake

Species of snake

Erythrolamprus typhlus, the blind ground snake or velvet ground snake, is a species of South American snake in the family Colubridae. It is found in Colombia, Venezuela, Guyana, Suriname, French Guiana, Brazil, Peru, Ecuador, Paraguay, and Bolivia.

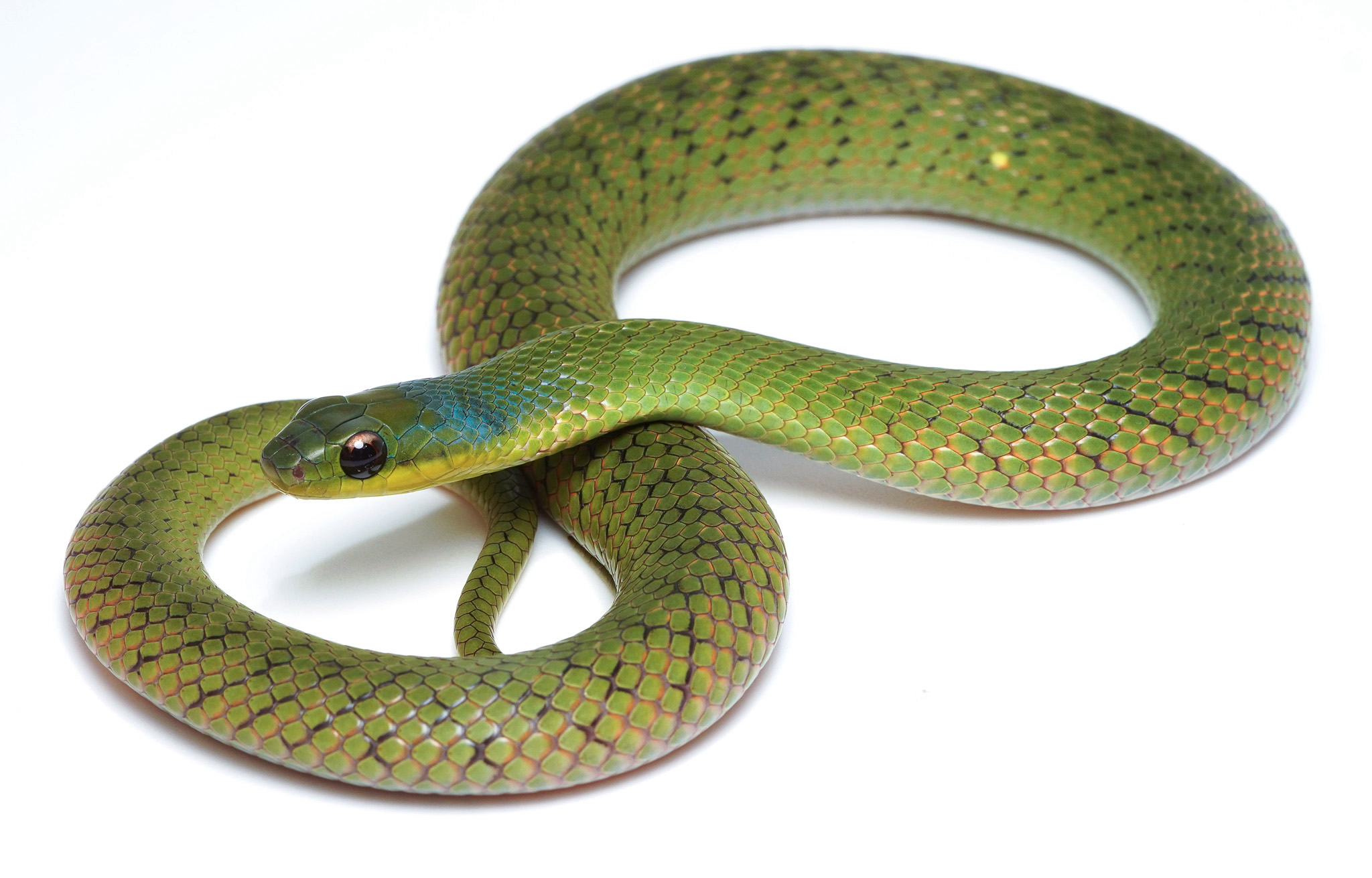
An adult Erythrolamprus typhlus, velvet swamp snake

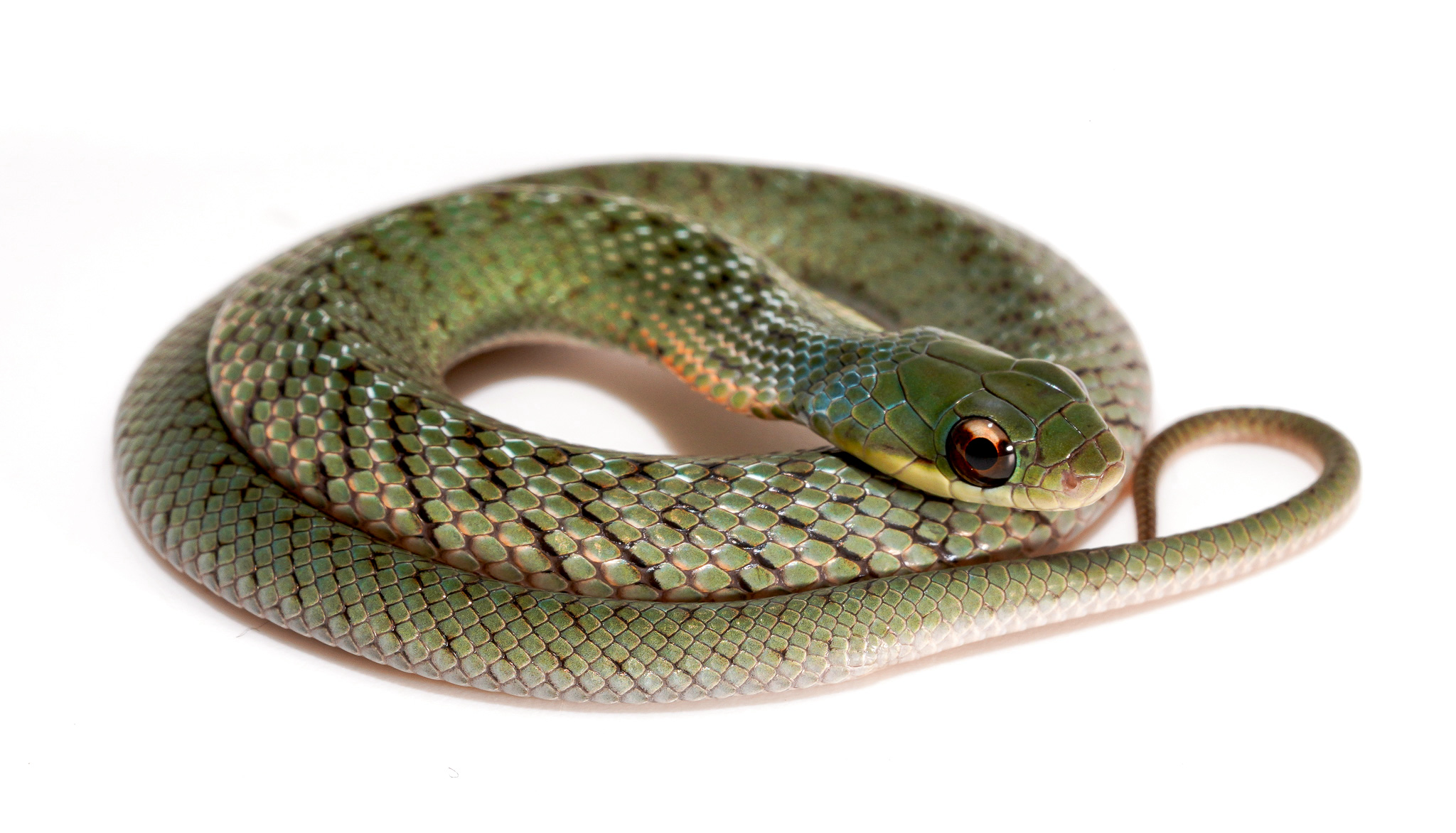
A juvenile Erythrolamprus typhlus, velvet swamp snake

== Classification ==
Erythrolamprus typhlus belongs to the genus Erythrolamprus, which contains over 50 species. The genus Erythrolamprus belongs to the subfamily Dipsadinae, which is sometimes referred to as the family Dipsadidae.

Recent phylogenetic analysis of morphological and molecular DNA evidence has shown that Erythrolamprus typhlus is now likely paraphyletic.

The relationships of Erythrolamprus species located in northern South America can be shown in the cladogram below:

- - E. poecilogyrus (paraphyletic)
  - - E. ceii
    - E. poecilogyrus (paraphyletic)
- - E. miliaris
  - E. miliaris
  - - - Erythrolamprus typhlus (Brazil) (paraphyletic)
      - - E. reginae (paraphyletic)
        - - E. reginae (paraphyletic)
          - E. zweifeli
    - - E. breviceps
      - E. epinephalus (Peru) (paraphyletic)
      - - - E. epinephalus (Costa Rica) (paraphyletic)
          - E. pseudoreginae
        - E. melanotus
  - - - E. atraventer
      - - E. jaegeri
        - E. almadensis
    - - - E. juliae
        - E. cursor
      - Erythrolamprus typhlus (French Guiana) (paraphyletic)
    - - E. cobella
      - - - E. aesculapii (Brazil) (paraphyletic)
          - E. ocellatus
        - - E. aesculapii (French Guiana & Guyana) (paraphyletic)
          - - E. bizona
            - E. mimus
