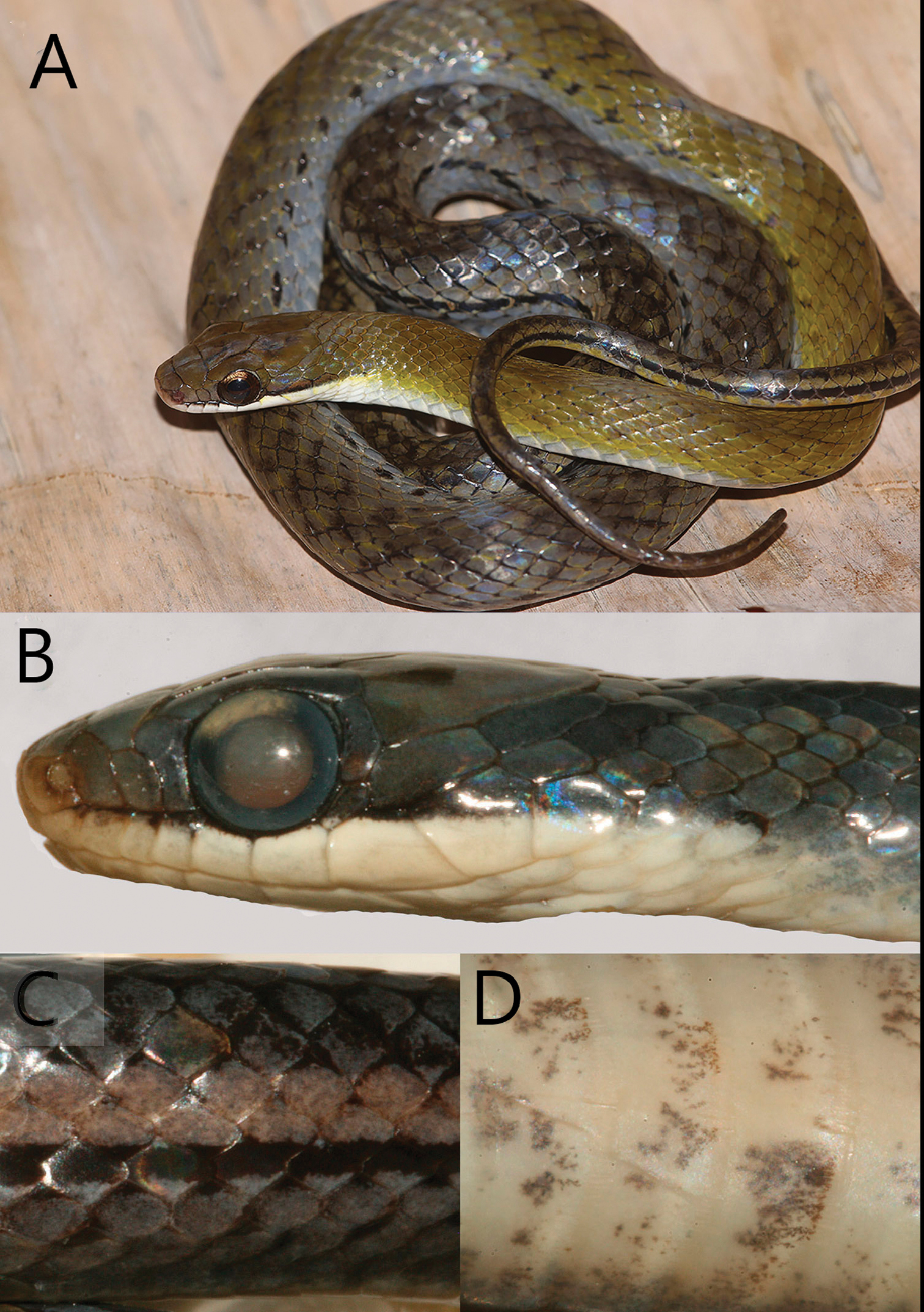

Scientific classification
- Kingdom: Animalia
- Phylum: Chordata
- Class: Reptilia
- Order: Squamata
- Suborder: Serpentes
- Family: Colubridae
- Subfamily: Dipsadinae
- Genus: Erythrolamprus
- Species: E. pseudoreginae

Binomial name
- Erythrolamprus pseudoreginae Murphy, Braswell, Charles, Auguste, Rivas, Borzee, Lehtinen, & Jowers, 2019

= Erythrolamprus pseudoreginae =

Tobago stream snake

Species of snake

Erythrolamprus pseudoreginae, the Tobago stream snake, is a species of snake in the family Colubridae. The species is found in the northeastern forests of the island of Tobago.

== Etymology ==
The species name pseudoreginae was chosen because it was previously considered to be a member of the separate species Erythrolamprus reginae.

== Classification ==
Erythrolamprus pseudoreginae belongs to the genus Erythrolamprus, which contains over 50 species. The genus Erythrolamprus belongs to the subfamily Dipsadinae, which is sometimes referred to as the family Dipsadidae. The relationships of Erythrolamprus species located in northern South America (Venezuela) can be shown in the cladogram below, based on molecular DNA analysis:

- - E. poecilogyrus (paraphyletic)
  - - E. ceii
    - E. poecilogyrus (paraphyletic)
- - E. miliaris
  - E. miliaris
  - - - E. typhlus (Brazil) (paraphyletic)
      - - E. reginae (paraphyletic)
        - - E. reginae (paraphyletic)
          - E. zweifeli
    - - E. breviceps
      - E. epinephalus (Peru) (paraphyletic)
      - - - E. epinephalus (Costa Rica) (paraphyletic)
          - Erythrolamprus pseudoreginae
        - E. melanotus
  - - - E. atraventer
      - - E. jaegeri
        - E. almadensis
    - - - E. juliae
        - E. cursor
      - E. typhlus (French Guiana) (paraphyletic)
    - - E. cobella
      - - - E. aesculapii (Brazil) (paraphyletic)
          - E. ocellatus
        - - E. aesculapii (French Guiana & Guyana) (paraphyletic)
          - - E. bizona
            - E. mimus

== Description ==
Erythrolamprus pseudoreginae is dark moss green to olive brown colored, with a lighter yellow to red colored belly, and a faint lateral stripe. Specimens measured in length from 47.6 cm (18.7 in) to 56.6 cm (22.3 in). It is diurnal, and likely preys upon small ground-dwelling frogs.

== Distribution ==
It lives in northeastern Tobago, within forested ravines of the Main Ridge. Its habitat appears to be restricted to the lower montane rainforests of the region.
