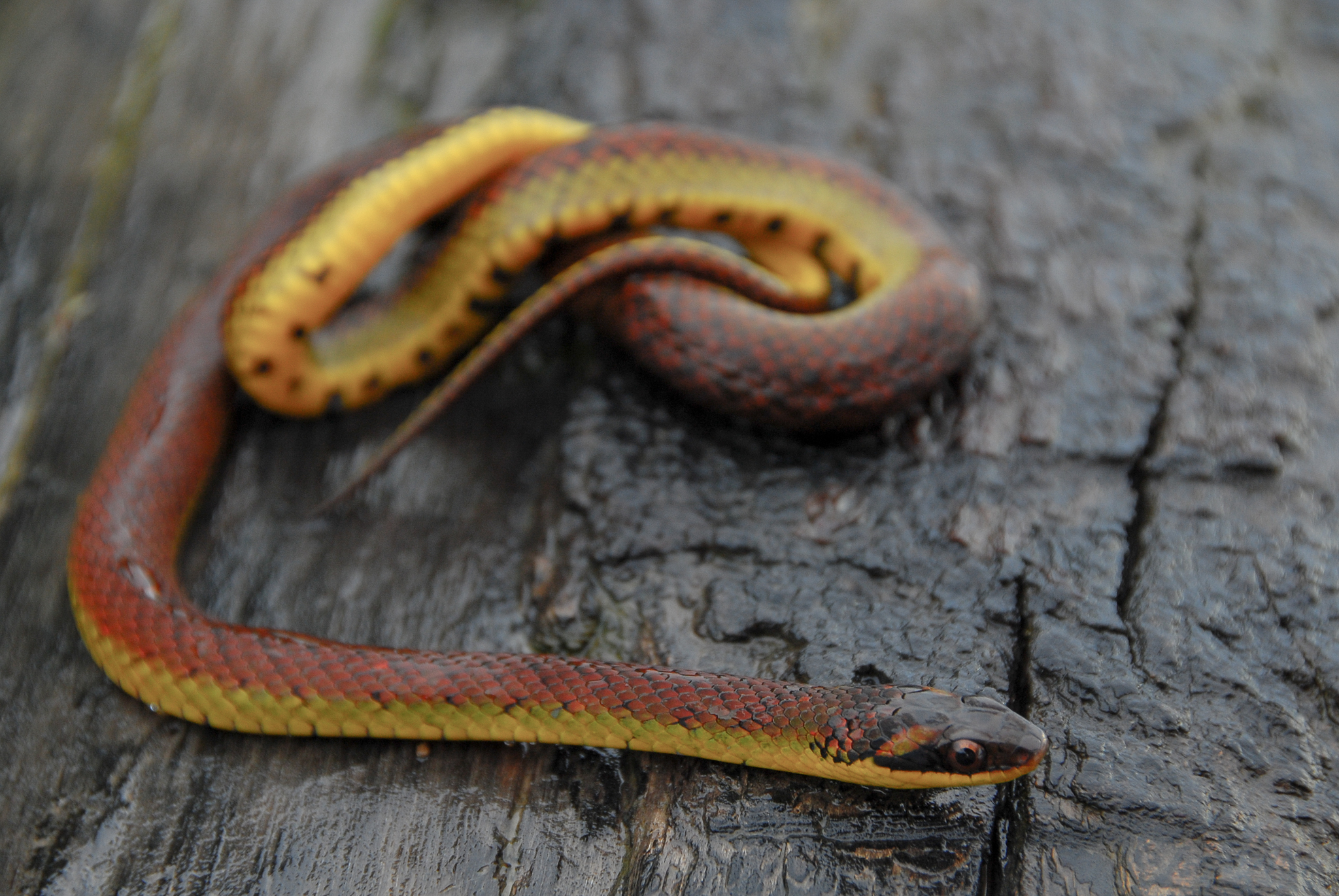
- Erythrolamprus dorsocorallinus

Conservation status
- Least Concern (IUCN 3.1)

Scientific classification
- Kingdom: Animalia
- Phylum: Chordata
- Class: Reptilia
- Order: Squamata
- Suborder: Serpentes
- Family: Colubridae
- Genus: Erythrolamprus
- Species: E. dorsocorallinus

Binomial name
- Erythrolamprus dorsocorallinus (Esqueda, Natera, La Marca & Ilija-Fistar, 2007)

= Erythrolamprus dorsocorallinus =

Species of snake

Erythrolamprus dorsocorallinus is a species of snake in the family Colubridae. The species is found in Venezuela, Brazil, Bolivia, and Peru.
