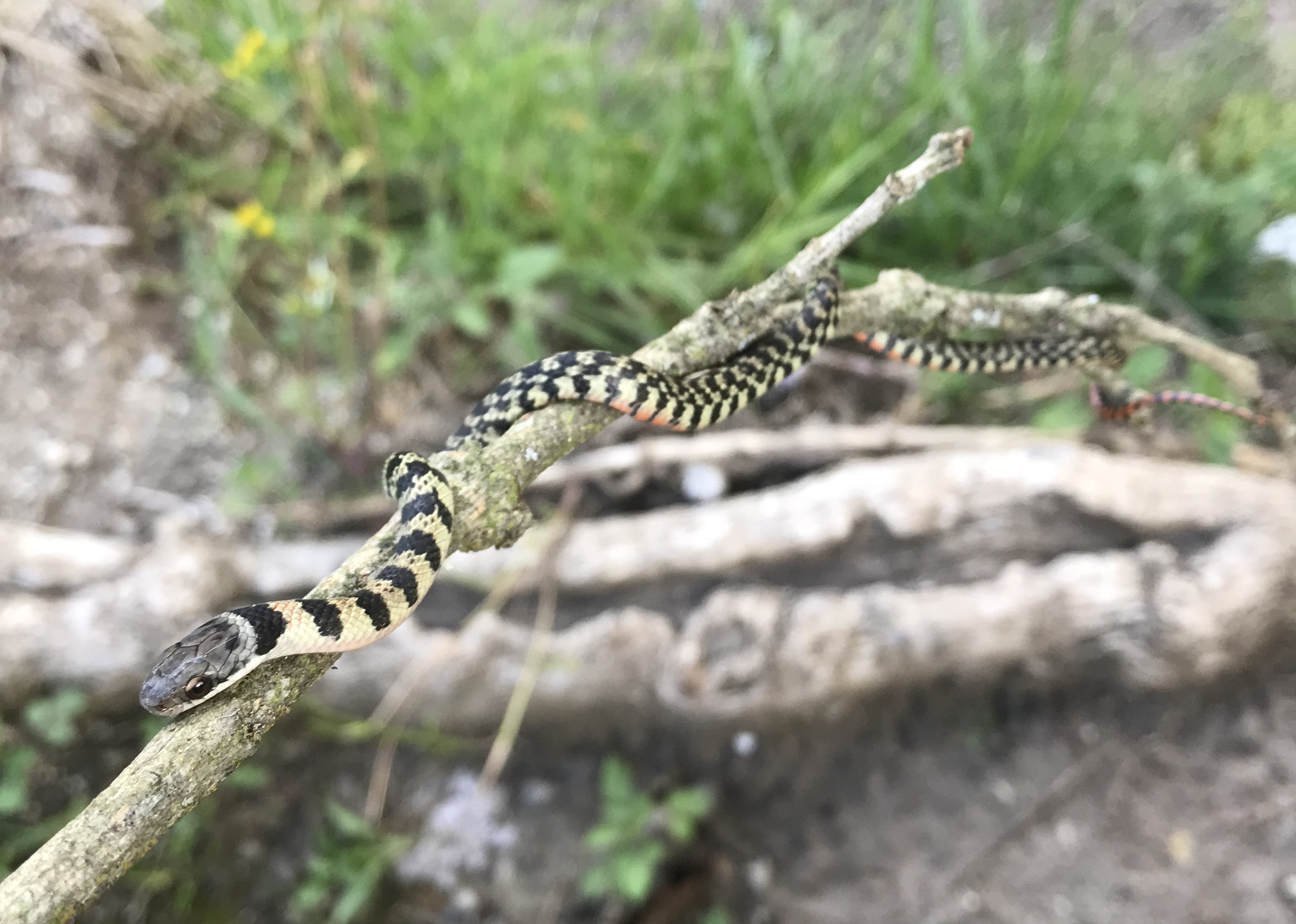

Conservation status
- Least Concern (IUCN 3.1)

Scientific classification
- Kingdom: Animalia
- Phylum: Chordata
- Class: Reptilia
- Order: Squamata
- Suborder: Serpentes
- Family: Colubridae
- Genus: Erythrolamprus
- Species: E. festae

Binomial name
- Erythrolamprus festae (Peracca, 1897)

Synonyms
- Rhadinaea festae Peracca, 1897; Liophis festae — Amaral, 1929; Erythrolamprus festae — Grazziotin et al., 2012

= Erythrolamprus festae =

Species of snake

Erythrolamprus festae, also known commonly as the drab ground snake, is a species of snake in the family Colubridae. The species is native to northwestern South America.

== Etymology ==
The specific name, festae, is in honor of Italian zoologist Enrico Festa.

== Geographic range ==
E. festae is found in Ecuador and Peru.

== Habitat ==
The preferred natural habitat of E. festae is forest, at altitudes of 600–1,680 m (1,970–5,510 ft).

== Reproduction ==
E. festae is oviparous.
