= Erythrolamprus andinus =

Conservation status
- Data Deficient (IUCN 3.1)

Scientific classification
- Kingdom: Animalia
- Phylum: Chordata
- Class: Reptilia
- Order: Squamata
- Suborder: Serpentes
- Family: Colubridae
- Genus: Erythrolamprus
- Species: E. andinus

Binomial name
- Erythrolamprus andinus (Dixon, 1983)

Species of snake

Erythrolamprus andinus is a species of snake in the family Colubridae. The species is found in Bolivia and Peru.
