= Erythrolamprus mertensi =

Conservation status
- Least Concern (IUCN 3.1)

Scientific classification
- Kingdom: Animalia
- Phylum: Chordata
- Class: Reptilia
- Order: Squamata
- Suborder: Serpentes
- Family: Colubridae
- Genus: Erythrolamprus
- Species: E. mertensi

Binomial name
- Erythrolamprus mertensi (Roze, 1964)

Synonyms
- Umbrivaga mertensi Roze, 1964

Species of snake

Erythrolamprus mertensi, also known commonly as Mertens's tropical forest snake, is a species of snake in the subfamily Dipsadinae of the family Colubridae. The species is endemic to Venezuela.

== Etymology ==
The specific name, mertensi, is in honor of German herpetologist Robert Mertens.

== Geographic distribution ==
Erythrolamprus mertensi is found in the Venezuelan state of Aragua.

== Habitat ==
The preferred natural habitat of Erythrolamprus mertensi is forest, at elevations of 1,100–1,240 m (3,610–4,070 ft).

== Behavior ==
Erythrolamprus mertensi is terrestrial and diurnal.

== Reproduction ==
Erythrolamprus mertensi is oviparous.
