= Erythrolamprus pseudocorallus =

Conservation status
- Least Concern (IUCN 3.1)

Scientific classification
- Kingdom: Animalia
- Phylum: Chordata
- Class: Reptilia
- Order: Squamata
- Suborder: Serpentes
- Family: Colubridae
- Genus: Erythrolamprus
- Species: E. pseudocorallus

Binomial name
- Erythrolamprus pseudocorallus Roze, 1959

Species of snake

Erythrolamprus pseudocorallus, the false coral snake, is a species of snake in the family Colubridae. The species is found in Venezuela and Colombia.
