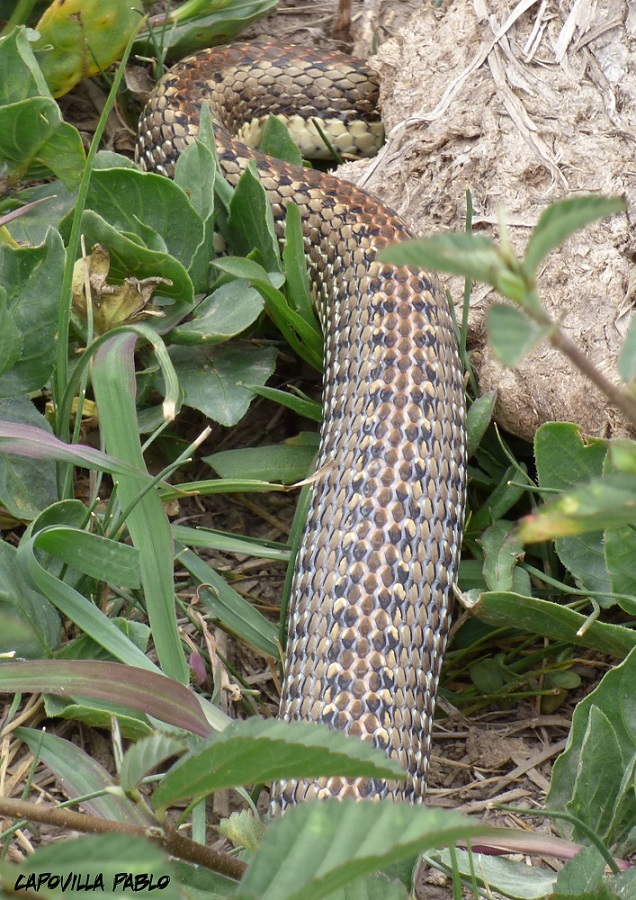

Conservation status
- Least Concern (IUCN 3.1)

Scientific classification
- Kingdom: Animalia
- Phylum: Chordata
- Class: Reptilia
- Order: Squamata
- Suborder: Serpentes
- Family: Colubridae
- Genus: Erythrolamprus
- Species: E. sagittifer

Binomial name
- Erythrolamprus sagittifer (Jan, 1863)

= Erythrolamprus sagittifer =

Species of snake

Erythrolamprus sagittifer, the arrow ground snake, is a species of snake in the family Colubridae. The species is found in Argentina, Bolivia, and Paraguay.
