= Erythrolamprus pyburni =

Conservation status
- Least Concern (IUCN 3.1)

Scientific classification
- Kingdom: Animalia
- Phylum: Chordata
- Class: Reptilia
- Order: Squamata
- Suborder: Serpentes
- Family: Colubridae
- Genus: Erythrolamprus
- Species: E. pyburni

Binomial name
- Erythrolamprus pyburni (Markezich & Dixon, 1979)

Synonyms
- Umbrivaga pyburni Markezich & Dixon, 1979

Species of snake

Erythrolamprus pyburni, Pyburn's tropical forest snake, is a species of snake in the family Colubridae. The species is endemic to Colombia. It is only known from its type locality, Loma Linda in the Meta Department.

== Etymology ==
The specific name, pyburni, is in honor of American herpetologist William Frank "Billy" Pyburn (1927–2007).
