= Erythrolamprus ornatus =

Saint Lucia racer

Conservation status
- Critically Endangered (IUCN 2.3)

Scientific classification
- Kingdom: Animalia
- Phylum: Chordata
- Class: Reptilia
- Order: Squamata
- Suborder: Serpentes
- Family: Colubridae
- Genus: Erythrolamprus
- Species: E. ornatus

Binomial name
- Erythrolamprus ornatus (Garman, 1887)

Synonyms
- Dromicus giganteus Jan, 1863 (nomen nudum); Dromicus ornatus Garman, 1887; Liophis ornatus (Garman, 1887)

Species of snake

Erythrolamprus ornatus, also known commonly as the ornate ground snake and the Saint Lucia racer, is a species of snake in the family Colubridae. The species is native to the eastern Caribbean. It is the rarest snake on earth with fewer than 20 left in the wild.

== Geographic range ==
Erythrolamprus ornatus is endemic to Saint Lucia, an island nation in the West Indies, in the eastern Caribbean Sea. It once lived all over Saint Lucia, but now is only found on the islet of Maria Major.

== Description ==
Adults of this non-venomous snake, E. ornatus, may attain a total length (including tail) of 123.5 cm (48.6 in). Its coloration is variable. Some individuals have a broad brown vertebral stripe. In others, the brown stripe is interrupted by alternating yellow spots.

== Behavior and ecology ==
The preferred natural habitats of E. ornatus are forest and shrubland, at altitudes from sea level to 950 m (3,120 ft). E. ornatus is an ambush predator of small rodents and lizards, and probably diurnal. E. ornatus is oviparous.

== Conservation status ==
The introduction of the Small Indian Mongoose to Saint Lucia is believed to be the primary cause for the population decline of this species. There had been no recorded sightings of the snake on Saint Lucia since the 1800s, and in 1936 the species was declared extinct. However, a single individual was rediscovered in 1973 on a small island called Maria Major, off the coast of Vieux Fort, Saint Lucia. The remaining wild population is only found on Maria Major due to it being free of invasive predators like mongooses. In 2012, 11 individuals were found on Maria Major and estimates put the total population size around 18 individuals. Currently the Durrell Wildlife Conservation Trust, working with Fauna & Flora International, Saint Lucia National Trust and Saint Lucia Forestry Department, are working to build a captive breeding population with two facilities, one for breeding the snakes and one for cultivating food sources.
