= Erythrolamprus mossoroensis =

Conservation status
- Least Concern (IUCN 3.1)

Scientific classification
- Kingdom: Animalia
- Phylum: Chordata
- Class: Reptilia
- Order: Squamata
- Suborder: Serpentes
- Family: Colubridae
- Genus: Erythrolamprus
- Species: E. mossoroensis

Binomial name
- Erythrolamprus mossoroensis (Hoge & Lima-Verde, 1973)

Species of snake

Erythrolamprus mossoroensis is a species of snake in the family Colubridae. The species is found in Brazil.
