= Erythrolamprus viridis =

Conservation status
- Least Concern (IUCN 3.1)

Scientific classification
- Kingdom: Animalia
- Phylum: Chordata
- Class: Reptilia
- Order: Squamata
- Suborder: Serpentes
- Family: Colubridae
- Genus: Erythrolamprus
- Species: E. viridis

Binomial name
- Erythrolamprus viridis (Günther, 1862)

Species of snake

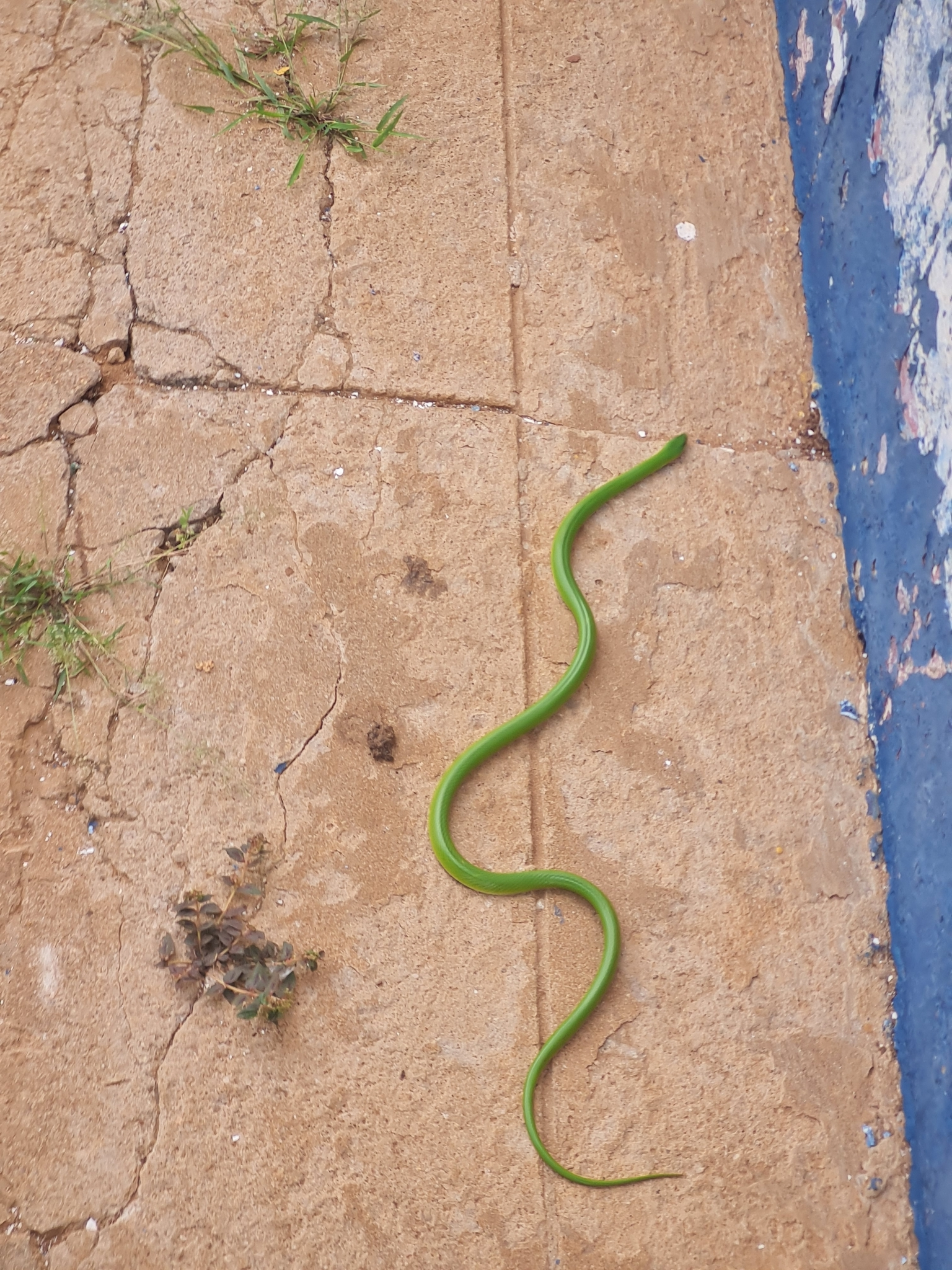
Erythrolamprus viridis prasinus

Erythrolamprus viridis, the crown ground snake, is a species of snake in the family Colubridae. The species is found in Brazil.
