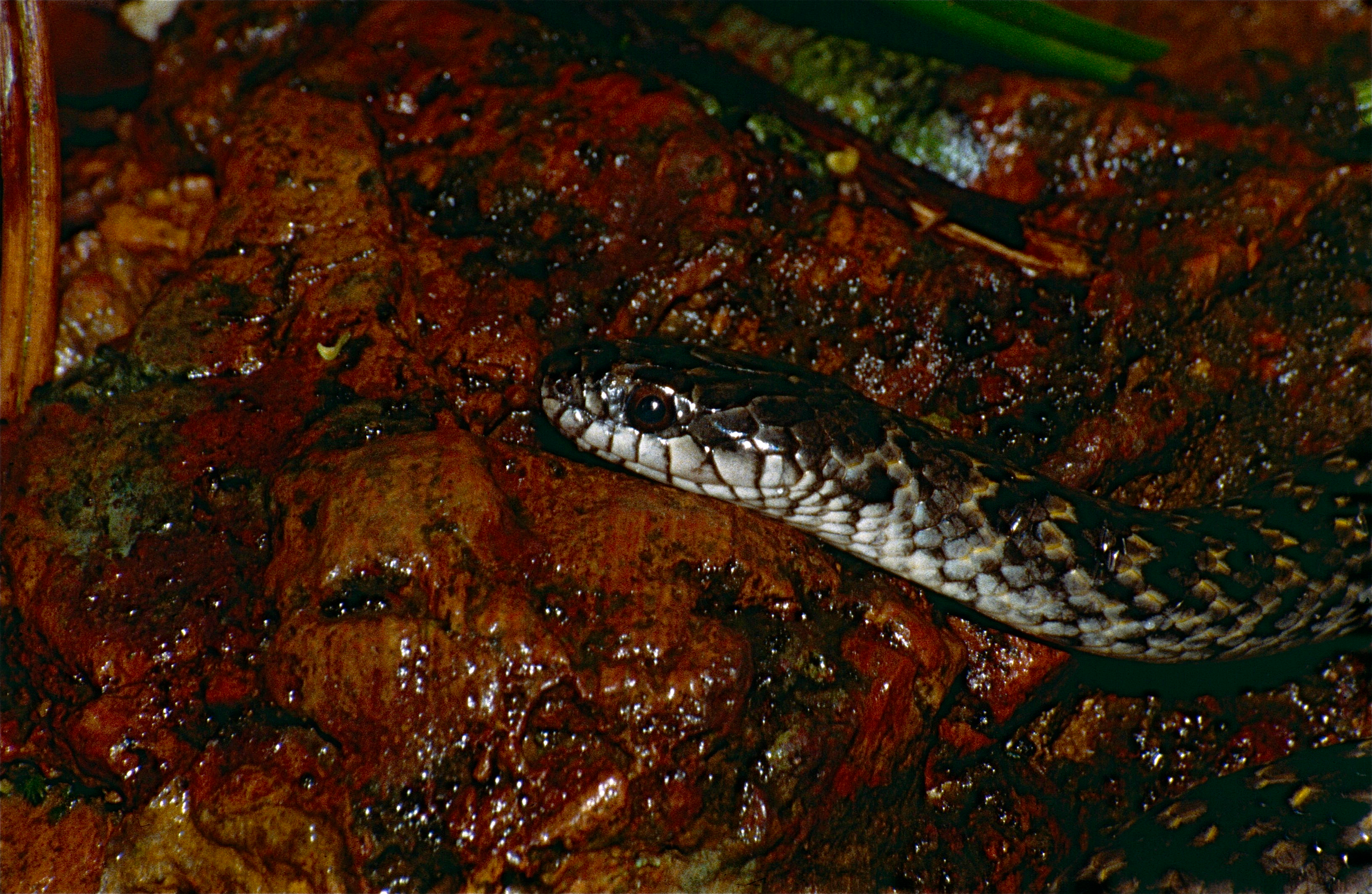

Conservation status
- Least Concern (IUCN 3.1)

Scientific classification
- Kingdom: Animalia
- Phylum: Chordata
- Class: Reptilia
- Order: Squamata
- Suborder: Serpentes
- Family: Colubridae
- Subfamily: Dipsadinae
- Genus: Erythrolamprus
- Species: E. cobella

Binomial name
- Erythrolamprus cobella (Linnaeus, 1758)

Synonyms
- Coluber cobella Linnaeus, 1758; Coronella cobella (Linnaeus, 1758); Liophis cobella (Linnaeus, 1758); Rhadinæa cobella (Linnaeus, 1758)

= Erythrolamprus cobella =

Species of snake

Erythrolamprus cobella, commonly known as the mangrove snake, is a species of small semi-aquatic snake, which is endemic to South America.

== Classification ==
Erythrolamprus cobella belongs to the genus Erythrolamprus, which contains over 50 species. The genus Erythrolamprus belongs to the subfamily Dipsadinae, which is sometimes referred to as the family Dipsadidae. The relationships of Erythrolamprus species located in northern South America (Venezuela) can be shown in the cladogram below, based on molecular DNA analysis:

- - E. poecilogyrus (paraphyletic)
  - - E. ceii
    - E. poecilogyrus (paraphyletic)
- - E. miliaris
  - E. miliaris
  - - - E. typhlus (Brazil) (paraphyletic)
      - - E. reginae (paraphyletic)
        - - E. reginae (paraphyletic)
          - E. zweifeli
    - - E. breviceps
      - E. epinephalus (Peru) (paraphyletic)
      - - - E. epinephalus (Costa Rica) (paraphyletic)
          - E. pseudoreginae
        - E. melanotus
  - - - E. atraventer
      - - E. jaegeri
        - E. almadensis
    - - - E. juliae
        - E. cursor
      - E. typhlus (French Guiana) (paraphyletic)
    - - Erythrolamprus cobella
      - - - E. aesculapii (Brazil) (paraphyletic)
          - E. ocellatus
        - - E. aesculapii (French Guiana & Guyana) (paraphyletic)
          - - E. bizona
            - E. mimus

== Description ==
Adults may attain a total length of 73 cm (29 in), which includes a tail 12.5 cm (4.9 in) long.

Dorsally, it is black or dark brown with white crossbands. Ventrally it is red with black crossbands. The upper labials are white or yellowish.

There are 8 upper labials, the 4th and 5th entering the eye. The dorsal scales, which are smooth and without apical pits, are arranged in 17 rows at midbody. Ventrals 143–163; anal plate divided; subcaudals 45–57, also divided (in two rows).

== Geographic range ==
It is found in northern South America east of the Andes, in the Guianas, eastern Venezuela, and Trinidad and Tobago (although only on the island of Trinidad, not Tobago.)

== Habitat ==
It is a semi-aquatic species, and lives in lowland rainforest river floodplains and coastal mangrove swamps.

== Diet ==
It feeds on frogs, geckos, and fish.
