= Erythrolamprus ingeri =

Conservation status
- Least Concern (IUCN 3.1)

Scientific classification
- Kingdom: Animalia
- Phylum: Chordata
- Class: Reptilia
- Order: Squamata
- Suborder: Serpentes
- Family: Colubridae
- Genus: Erythrolamprus
- Species: E. ingeri

Binomial name
- Erythrolamprus ingeri (Roze, 1958)

Synonyms
- Liophis ingeri Roze, 1958; Erythrolamprus ingeri — Grazziotin et al., 2012

Species of snake

Erythrolamprus ingeri is a species of snake in the subfamily Dipsadinae of the family Colubridae. The species is endemic to Venezuela.

== Etymology ==
The specific name, ingeri, is in honor of American herpetologist Robert F. Inger.

== Geographic range ==
E. ingeri is found in the Venezuelan state of Bolívar.

== Habitat ==
The preferred natural habitats of E. ingeri are shrubland and freshwater wetlands, at altitudes of 1,900–2,100 m (6,200–6,900 ft).

== Reproduction ==
E. ingeri is oviparous.
