= Erythrolamprus lamonae =

Scientific classification
- Kingdom: Animalia
- Phylum: Chordata
- Class: Reptilia
- Order: Squamata
- Suborder: Serpentes
- Family: Colubridae
- Genus: Erythrolamprus
- Species: E. lamonae

Binomial name
- Erythrolamprus lamonae (Dunn, 1944)

Species of snake

Erythrolamprus lamonae is a species of snake in the family Colubridae. The species is found in Colombia and Ecuador.
