= Erythrolamprus williamsi =

Conservation status
- Near Threatened (IUCN 3.1)

Scientific classification
- Kingdom: Animalia
- Phylum: Chordata
- Class: Reptilia
- Order: Squamata
- Suborder: Serpentes
- Family: Colubridae
- Genus: Erythrolamprus
- Species: E. williamsi

Binomial name
- Erythrolamprus williamsi (Roze, 1958)

Species of snake

Erythrolamprus williamsi, Williams's ground snake, is a species of snake in the family Colubridae. The species is found in Venezuela.
