= Erythrolamprus vitti =

Conservation status
- Data Deficient (IUCN 3.1)

Scientific classification
- Kingdom: Animalia
- Phylum: Chordata
- Class: Reptilia
- Order: Squamata
- Suborder: Serpentes
- Family: Colubridae
- Genus: Erythrolamprus
- Species: E. vitti

Binomial name
- Erythrolamprus vitti (Dixon, 2000)

Species of snake

Erythrolamprus vitti is a species of snake in the family Colubridae. The species is found in Ecuador and Colombia.
