= Georg Friedrich von Jäger =

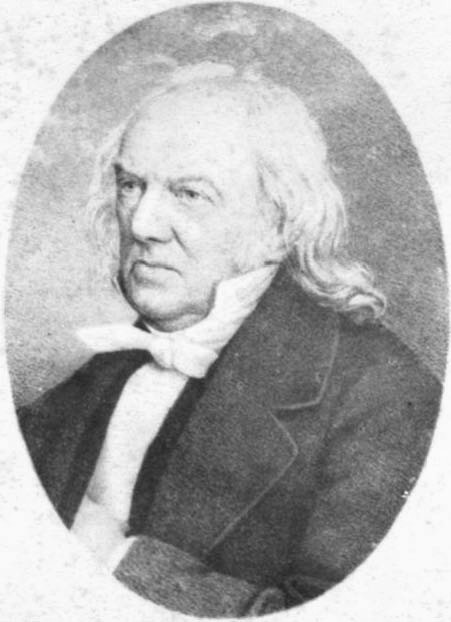
Georg Friedrich von Jäger

Georg Friedrich Jäger, from 1850 Georg Friedrich von Jäger (25 December 1785 – 10 September 1866), was a German medical doctor and paleontologist.

== Life ==
Jäger was born in Stuttgart, the son of physician Christian Friedrich von Jäger and Luise Frieder. An older brother was Carl Christoph Friedrich von Jäger (1773–1828), and he was introduced to natural history at an early age. Georg Friedrich went to study medicine at the Tübingen University, receiving a degree in 1808. After travels through Switzerland and France (where Cuvier allowed him to study collections at the Jardin des Plantes) he returned to practice medicine in Stuttgart, and in 1817 he became a director of the royal natural history cabinet.

In 1824 he published on ichthyosaurs and plant fossils discovered by Albert Mohr. He continued publishing on plant fossils, and described some mammal and reptile fossils from Stuttgart.

A species of South American snake, Erythrolamprus jaegeri, is named in his honor.
