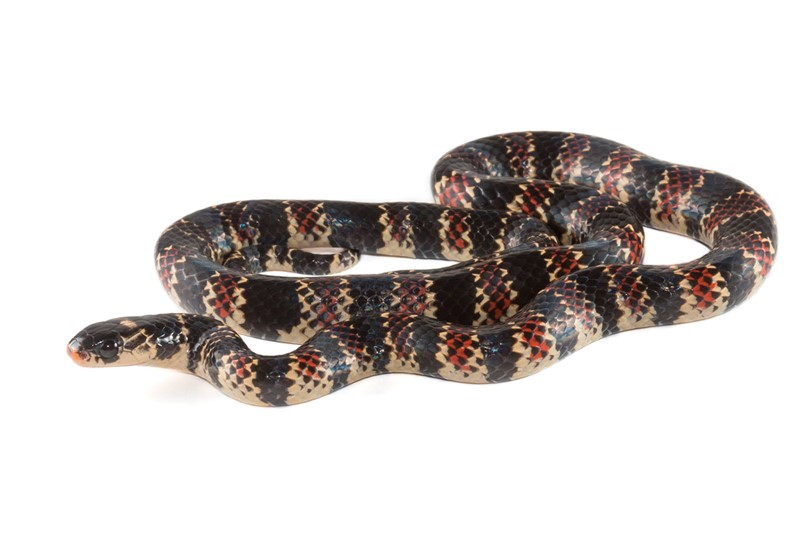
- Image of Erythrolamprus guentheri

Conservation status
- Least Concern (IUCN 3.1)

Scientific classification
- Kingdom: Animalia
- Phylum: Chordata
- Class: Reptilia
- Order: Squamata
- Suborder: Serpentes
- Family: Colubridae
- Genus: Erythrolamprus
- Species: E. guentheri

Binomial name
- Erythrolamprus guentheri Garman, 1883

= Erythrolamprus guentheri =

Species of snake

Erythrolamprus guentheri, also known commonly as Günther's false coral snake, is a species of snake in the subfamily Dipsadinae of the family Colubridae. The species is native to Ecuador and Peru.

== Etymology ==
The specific name, guentheri, is in honor of German-born British herpetologist Albert Günther.

== Geographic range ==
E. guentheri is found in eastern Ecuador and adjacent northern Peru.

== Habitat ==
The preferred natural habitat of E. guentheri is forest, at altitudes of 200–950 m (660–3,120 ft).

== Description ==
E. guentheri resembles venomous coral snakes of the genus Micrurus. Dorsally, it is tricolored, with wide crossbands of red and black, separated by narrow crossbands of yellow or white. Ventrally, however, it differs from coral snakes by lacking red coloration.

== Reproduction ==
E. guentheri is oviparous.
