= Ronda (samba-canção) =

Song by Inezita Barroso

from the album Moda da Pinga
- A-side: Marvada Pinga
- Released: November 1953
- Recorded: August 3, 1953
- Genre: Samba
- Length: 3:05
- Label: RCA Victor
- Composer: Paulo Vanzolini
- Lyricist: Paulo Vanzolini

Ronda is a Brazilian samba-canção song by composer and zoologist Paulo Vanzolini, released as the B-side of Inezita Barroso's album Marvada Pinga in November 1953.

The song became a sort of anthem for the city of São Paulo, and for years it was the most played and most requested song in the city’s bars and nightclubs. The song only became a hit in the 1970s, when it was recorded by the singer Márcia, since on Inezita’s album it was completely overshadowed by the success of the “moda de viola” track on Side A.

== History ==
=== Composition ===
Composed by Vanzolini in 1945, at the age of 21, while serving in the Army cavalry and patrolling red-light districts in downtown São Paulo. In an interview with the newspaper Folha de S.Paulo, he said: “I got tired of seeing women walk up to the bar, look inside as if they were looking for someone, and walk away. I saw more than just one. I wrote about it.”

On August 3, 1953, Vanzolini and his wife accompanied singer Inezita Barroso, a friend of the couple, to the recording of her album at the RCA Victor studio in downtown Rio de Janeiro. On that occasion, they recorded Marvada Pinga, a viola song by Laureano, later also credited to Raul Torres, which she had been performing successfully on the radio and in her live shows. However, during the recording session, it was overlooked that a track list was also needed for the B-side. Since the composer’s authorization was required due to copyright issues, and the only composer present was Vanzolini, Inezita reluctantly accepted the proposal and recorded the samba-canção, which had been composed eight years earlier. Thus, Ronda was recorded on the B-side of the RCA Victor 78-rpm record, catalog number 80-1217, and was released in November 1953.

Vanzolini recalled this story in 2003, in an interview on TV Cultura’s Roda Viva program: “No one had thought about a B-side. Inezita replied: ‘I know a lot of songs; I can record whatever you want.’ And they said: ‘But the composer has to give permission.’ Well, the only composer present was me.”

== Personnel ==
The musicians accompanying the singer, Inezita Barroso, on the original 1953 recording are:

- Abel Ferreira (1915–1980) on clarinet;
- Zé Menezes (1921–2014) on cavaquinho;
- Garoto (1915–1955) on tenor guitar;
- Dino Sete Cordas (1918–2006) on the seven-string guitar;
- Chiquinho do Acordeom (1928–1993).

== Repercussions ==
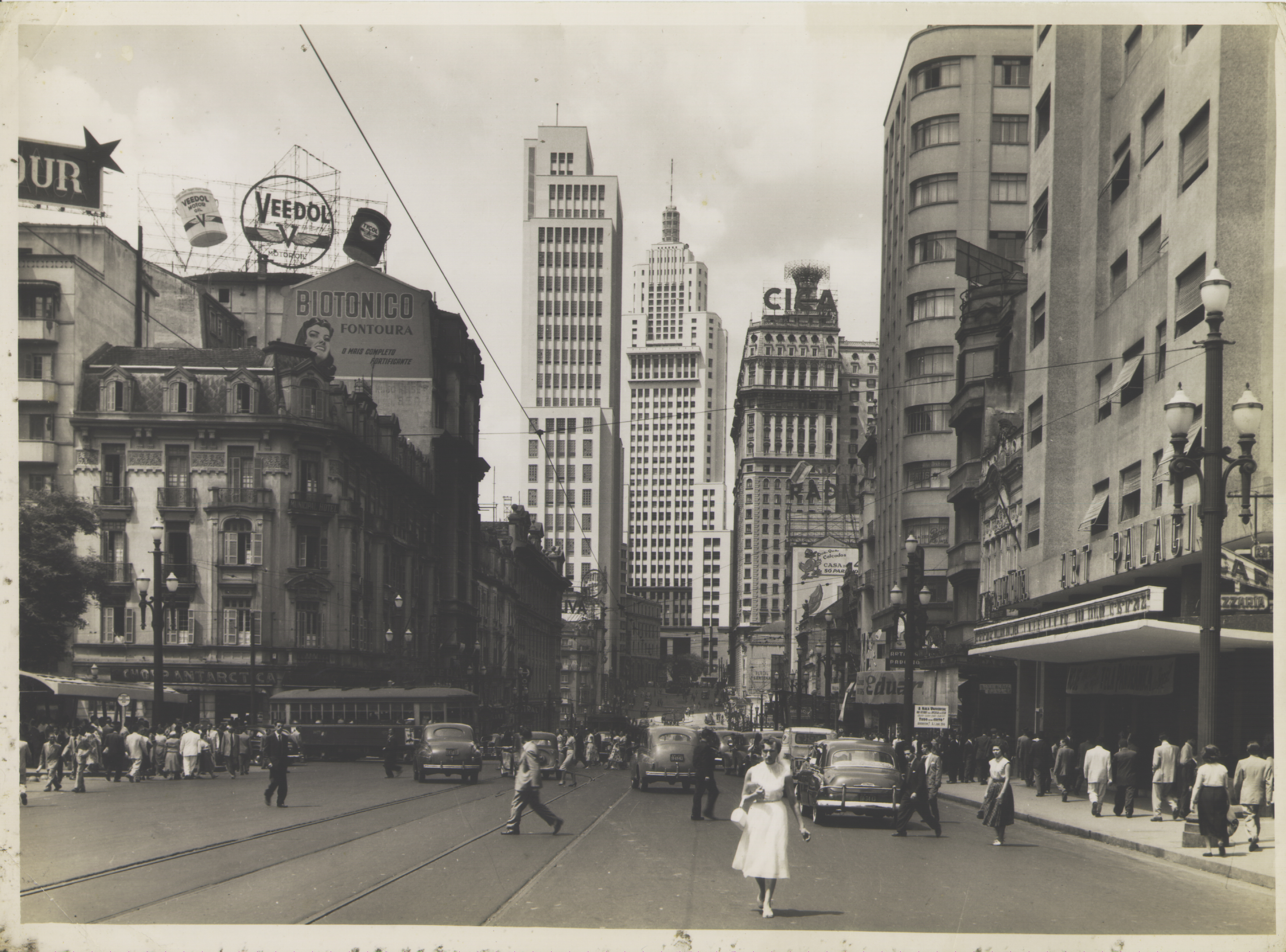
Avenida São João, in downtown São Paulo, in the 1950s.

Since the record did not attract the attention of critics or the public at the time, Ronda remained unknown for the following years, except in bohemian circles, where it was sung by the composer’s friends. It was not until 24 years after Inezita’s original recording that Ronda became a classic of Brazilian popular music.

In 1967, when he released the tribute album Onze sambas e uma capoeira, dedicated to Vanzolini’s repertoire, advertising executive and producer Marcus Pereira selected Ronda as one of the tracks, performed by singer Cláudia Moreno. The recording marked the beginning of the song’s success, and over the next two decades it garnered notable renditions by Marlene, Nora Ney, Cauby Peixoto, Jair Rodrigues, Emílio Santiago, Jards Macalé, Ângela Maria, Zeca Pagodinho, Carmen Costa, Fagner and Maria Bethânia. The definitive recording dates from 1977, featuring Márcia heartfelt rendition on the album she aptly titled Ronda.

In 2013, in an interview with Veja magazine, Vanzollini stated, “I owe a great deal to the city of São Paulo. It’s absurd how much they like Ronda, but they do.” The composer, in fact, didn’t like his first composition, as he often told the press. “I think it’s corny,” he snapped in an interview with Assis Ângelo for O Pasquim magazine, attributing the misstep to his immaturity at age 21: “It was a student thing, a case of student romanticism.”

By the time Ronda became a hit, Vanzolini already had another song of his that was a success: the samba Volta por Cima which the singer Noite Ilustrada released in 1962 after Inezita Barroso declined to make the first recording. Vanzolini had offered his friend the chance to record it first, but she turned it down, thinking the song was “not very commercial.”

== Analysis ==
At night, prowling the city, a desperate woman, disillusioned with life, tries to find her lover, who may be with other women, and the affair may end in a bloody scene. The suspense persists even in the conclusion, which is at once a threat and a crime already committed. The word “blood” in the penultimate line suggests aggression and injury, but it does not dispel the doubt about the protagonists’ fate.

The opening lines of Ronda showcase Vanzolini’s unique approach to songwriting, depicting everyday scenes he observed in the metropolis, especially during bohemian nights. Music critic Antonio Candido stated in the liner notes for the “Acerto de Contas” box set: “As a writer of lyrics and music, he is the opposite of verbosity, because he doesn’t ramble, he concentrates… he has a knack for verbal discoveries that make every word count. Vanzolini is a master of many facets.”

Despite the composer’s limited musical resources, the song features well-constructed harmony, as analyzed by musicologists Zuza Homem de Mello and Jairo Severino in the book A canção no tempo:

"‘Ronda’ has the virtue of captivating the listener right from the opening notes, thanks to the charm created by the descent of half a tone, through the notes E, E-flat, and D, which fall on the syllables ‘da’ in ‘ci-da-de,’ in the first verse, ‘rar’ and ‘trar’ from the words ‘pro-cu-rar’ and ‘en-con-trar’ in the second, respectively harmonized with A minor seventh chords, C minor with A in the bass, and D with a seventh."

— Zuza Homem de Mello and Jairo Severino, A canção no tempo

== In popular culture ==
Sampa the samba by Caetano Veloso released in 1978, is full of references to the city it honors, including Ronda whose melody is quoted in the Bahian artist’s composition. Vanzolini even complained that Caetano had plagiarized him, as Caetano ends his song, “And new Bahians can enjoy you just fine”, with a melodic phrase identical to the closing line of Ronda: “A bloody scene at a bar on Avenida São João” (also referenced in ”at the famous corner with Avenida Ipiranga). “If it was a tribute, I thought it was weird,” said Vanzolini regarding Sampa.

Interestingly, Vanzolini’s own samba-canção also bears melodic similarities to an earlier samba, Juramento falso composed by, J. Cascata and Leonel Azevedo, which was a hit in 1937 as performed by Orlando Silva. “It’s hard, it’s sad, the pain of longing is cruel / When you once held happiness in your hands,” sang the “Singer of the Crowds” in the second verse of the samba, which closely resembles the second verse of “Ronda “Ah, if only I had someone who truly loved me / That someone would tell me / Give it up, this struggle is futile / I wouldn’t give up.”

== Legacy ==
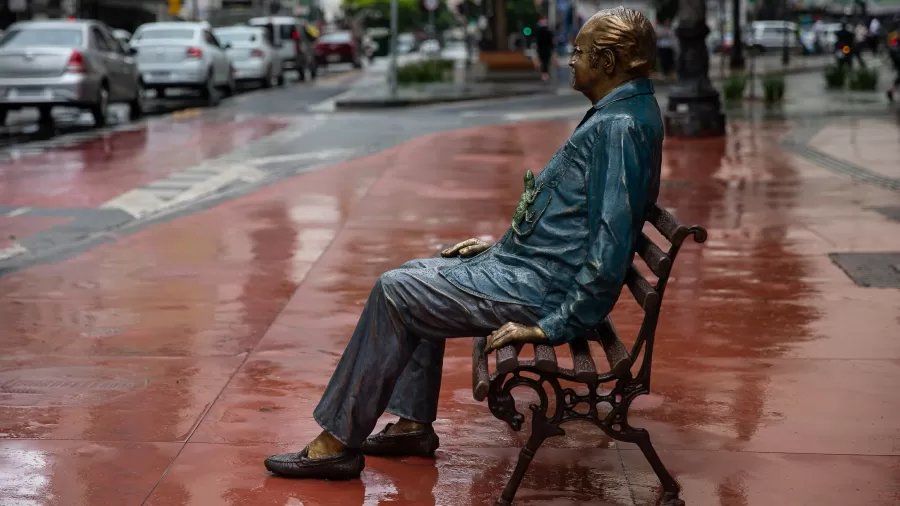
Statue of Paulo Vanzollini on Avenida São João.

In October 2009, to celebrate its third anniversary, Rolling Stone Brasil magazine published a special issue featuring “the 100 greatest Brazilian songs of all time”, and the song Ronda was ranked 70th.

Given the song’s significance to Avenida São João, a bronze statue of Paulo Vanzollini was unveiled in 2022 during Ricardo Nunes’s (MDB) administration.
