= G. darwinii =

G. darwinii may refer to:

- Gephyroberyx darwinii, the Darwin's slimehead, a slimehead fish species in the genus Gephyroberyx
- Gossypium darwinii, a cotton plant species found only on the Galapagos Islands
- Gymnodactylus darwinii, Gray, 1845, a gecko species in the genus Gymnodactylus

== See also ==
- G. darwini (disambiguation)
- Darwinii (disambiguation)
