= Gymnodactylus guttulatus =

Conservation status
- Least Concern (IUCN 3.1)

Scientific classification
- Kingdom: Animalia
- Phylum: Chordata
- Class: Reptilia
- Order: Squamata
- Suborder: Gekkota
- Family: Phyllodactylidae
- Genus: Gymnodactylus
- Species: G. guttulatus

Binomial name
- Gymnodactylus guttulatus Vanzolini, 1982

Species of lizard

Gymnodactylus guttulatus is a species of gecko in the family Phyllodactylidae. It is endemic to Serra do Espinhaço, Brazil.
