= Ilha de Cotunduba =

Uninhabited island in Rio de Janeiro, Brazil

- Cotunduba Island
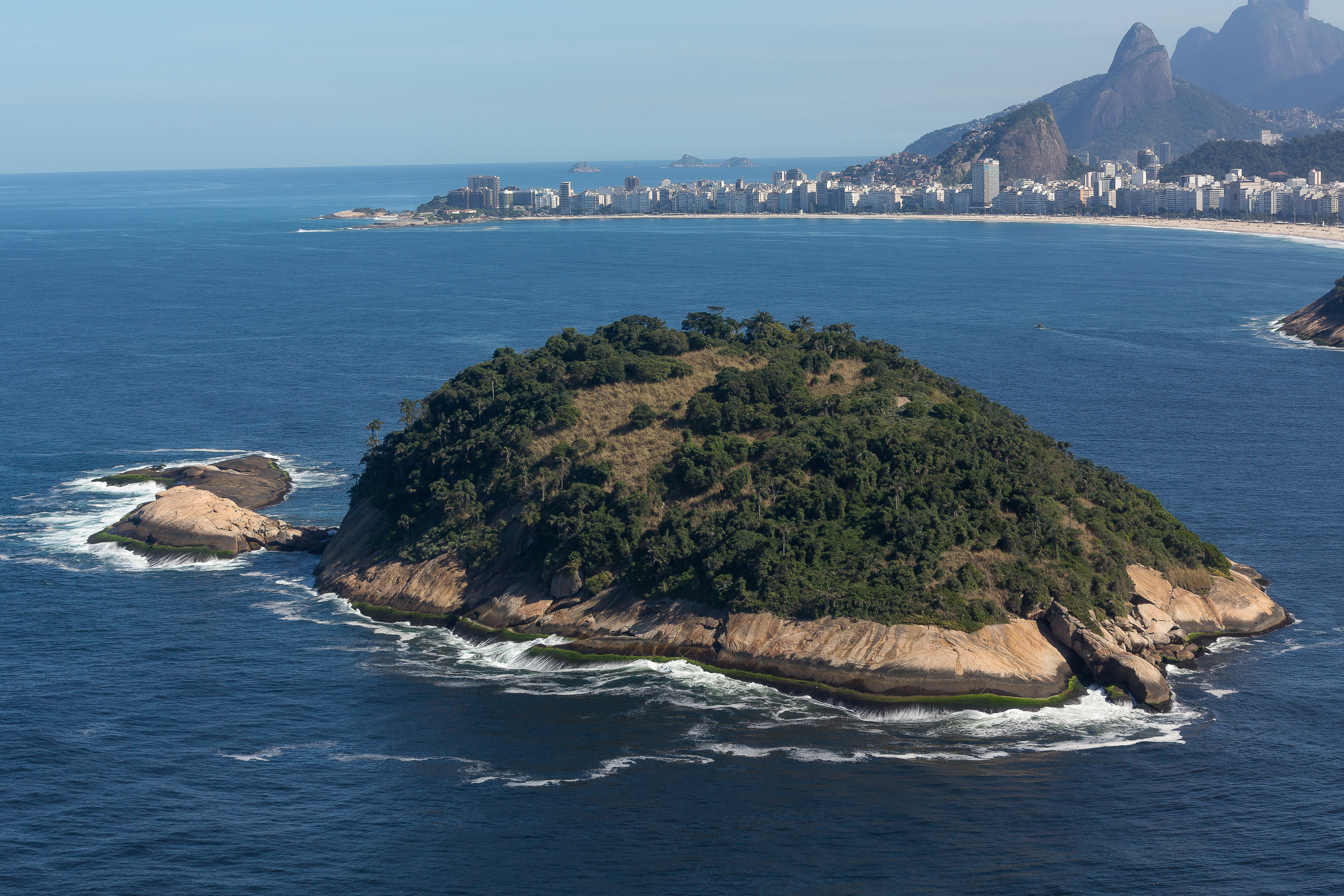
- Bird's eye view of the northeast side of Ilha de Cotunduba

- Location within Brazil
- Location: Rio de Janeiro, Brazil
- Coordinates: 22°57′49″S 43°08′57″W
- Area: 22.53 (Note: Area of the island and surrounding 50 metres (160 ft) buffer zone.) ha (55.7 acres)
- Designation: Natural monument
- Created: 12 November 1990

Ilha de Cotunduba (Cotunduba Island) is an uninhabited island located on Guanabara Bay, off the coast of Leme and Urca, in city of Rio de Janeiro, Brazil. The island has a 340 metres (1,120 ft) long peduncle to the southeast, dubbed the "Lower Cotunduba". The island's highest point is at 73 metres (240 ft) above sea level, with Lower Cotunduba reaching only 4 metres (13 ft) above sea level.

It has for multiple decades been part of an environmental protection area (Área de Proteção Ambiental, APA); initially, the APA do Morro do Leme, Urubu e Ilha de Cotunduba, created in 1990, which prohibited any construction in its territory, permanent or otherwise, unless for scientific or cultural purposes and with permission by the City. This protection was expanded in 1995, further designating the island as a Wildlife Conservation Zone (Zona de Conservação da Vida Silvestre, ZCVS) and prohibiting within its limits, among other things, the extraction of any resources, the disposal of any material, and the setting off of fireworks.

Despite its protection status prohibiting fishing in the surrounding waters, artisanal fishing is still often practiced on and around the island.

== Events ==
The island was historically used as a target to test weaponry, particularly from the nearby Fortaleza de Santa Cruz da Barra, around 3,000 metres (9,800 ft) away. This was the case, for example, on 25 September 1885, and on the morning of 6 November 1902. In the latter case, Campos Sales, then president of Brazil, visited the fort to participate in the inauguration of its new artillery. From there, the island was shot multiple times with different weapons, though a few shots reportedly missed.

During heavy fog in the late afternoon of 13 November 1894, Hamburg Süd's Amazonas steamboat, heading for the Port of Santos, crashed on the island and breached its hull. Due to its compartmentation, however, it didn't sink, and neither the crew nor any of its 13 passengers sustained any injuries.

On 7 August 1918, two men were stranded on the island after being thrown off their chata by strong waves. They were rescued by three fishermen who were sailing nearby.

== Fauna ==
In study results published in 2013 by the municipal government of Rio de Janeiro, it was reported that the tropical house gecko was found on the island, an invasive species that competes with the native Gymnodactylus darwinii.

== Gallery ==
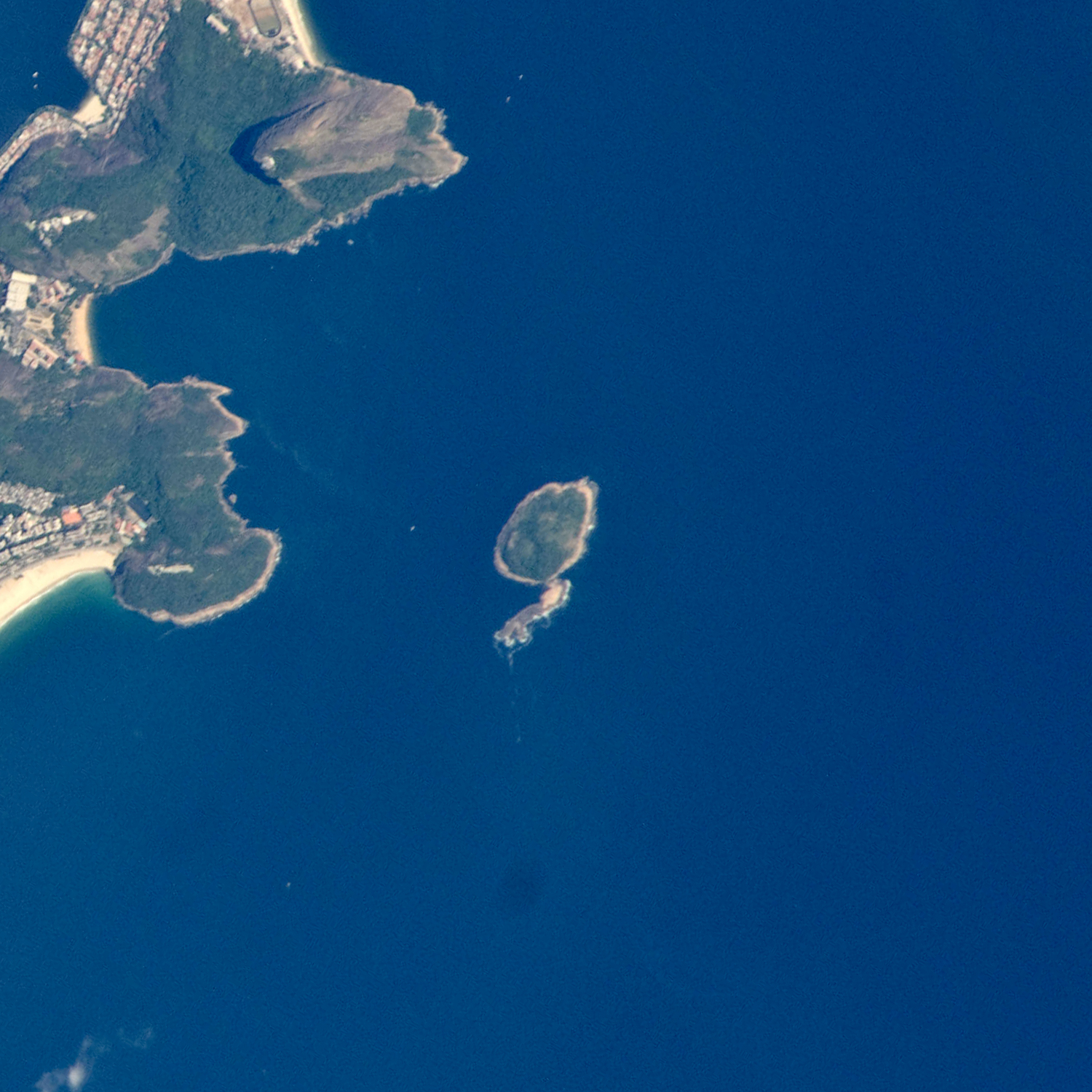
The island as seen from the ISS in 2011

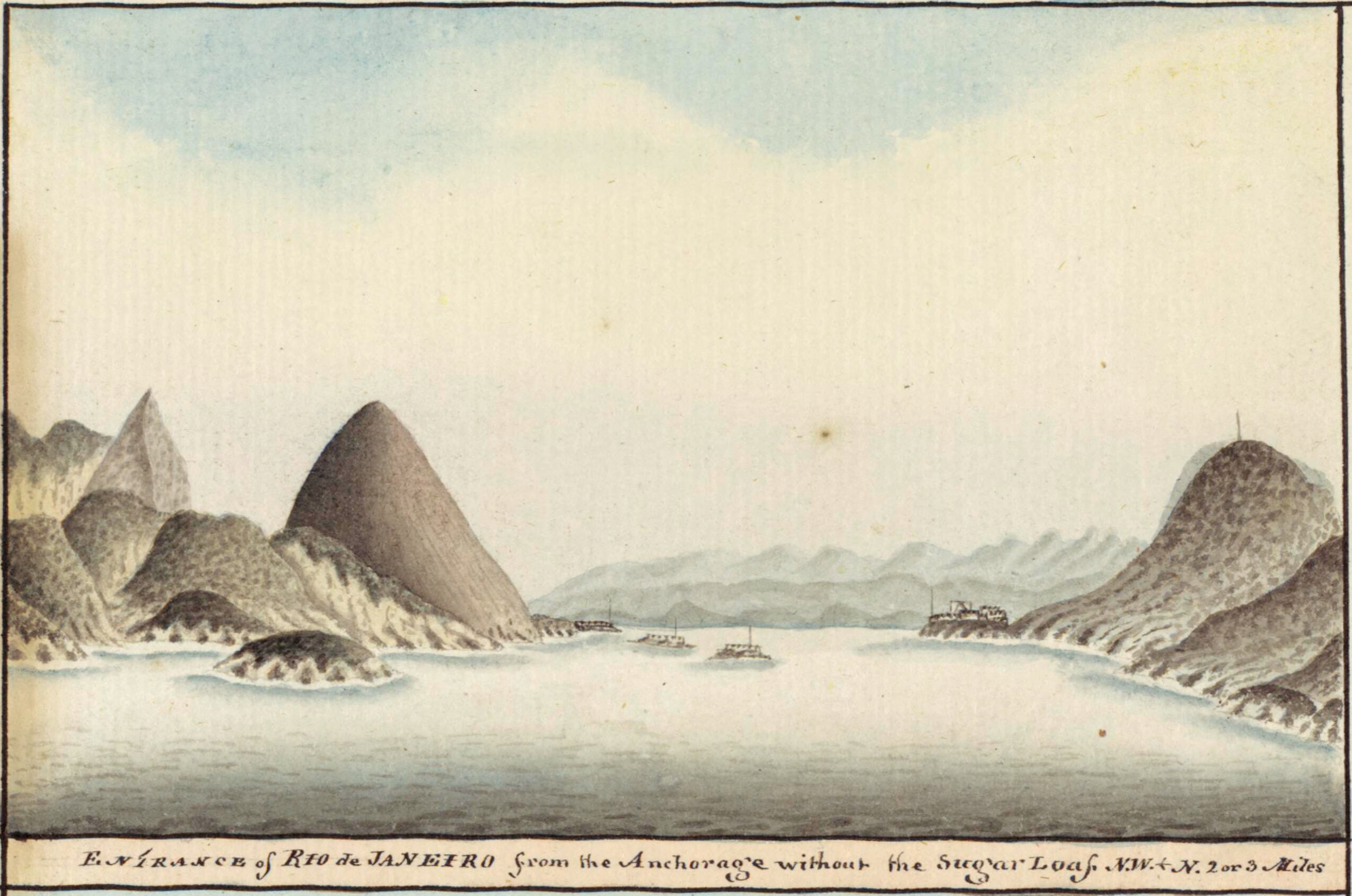
Engraving from c. 1791 showing Sugarloaf Mountain center-left, with Ilha de Cotunduba beneath it

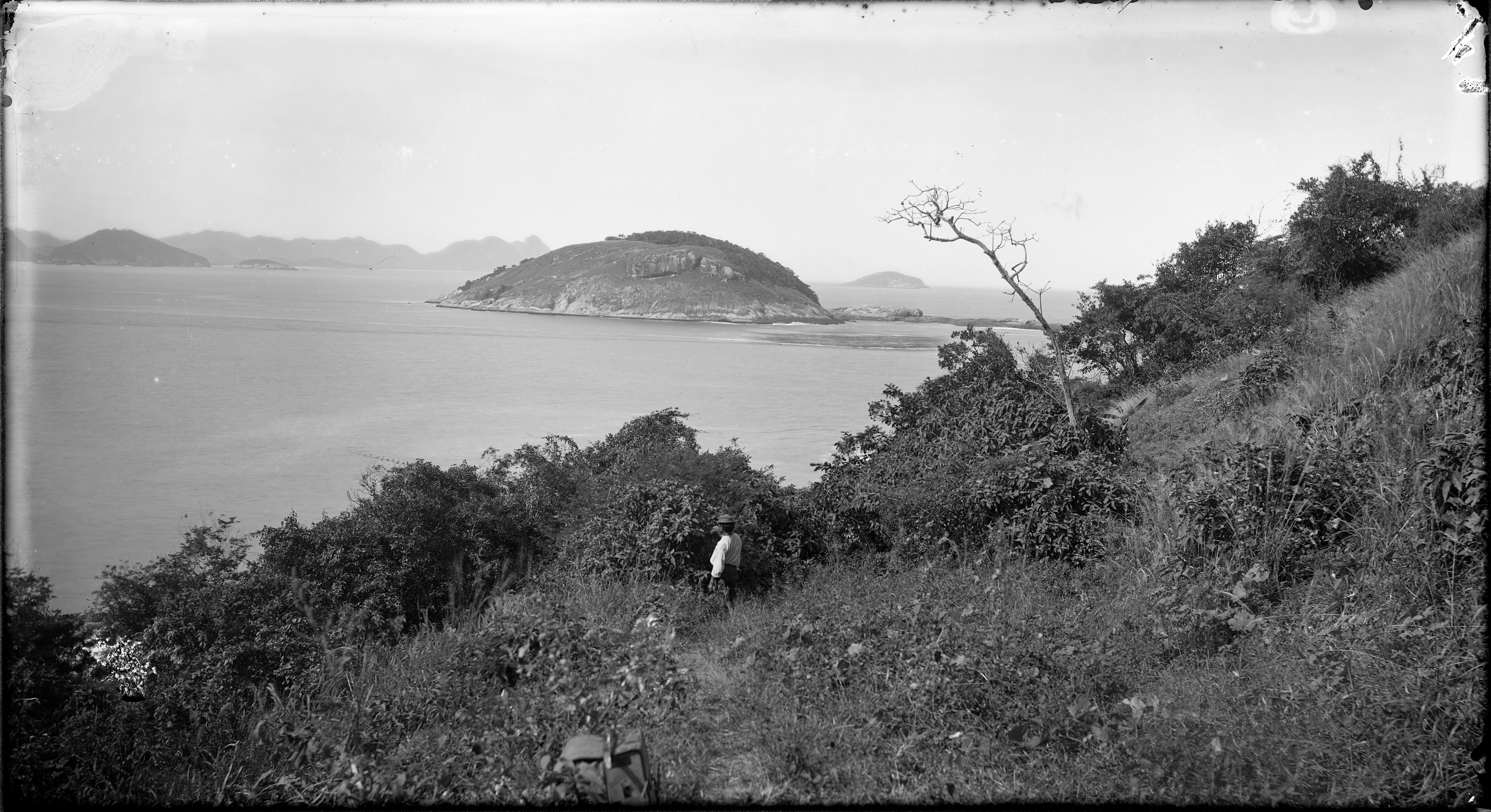
Photo taken c. 1890 by Marc Ferrez of the island as seen from Morro do Leme

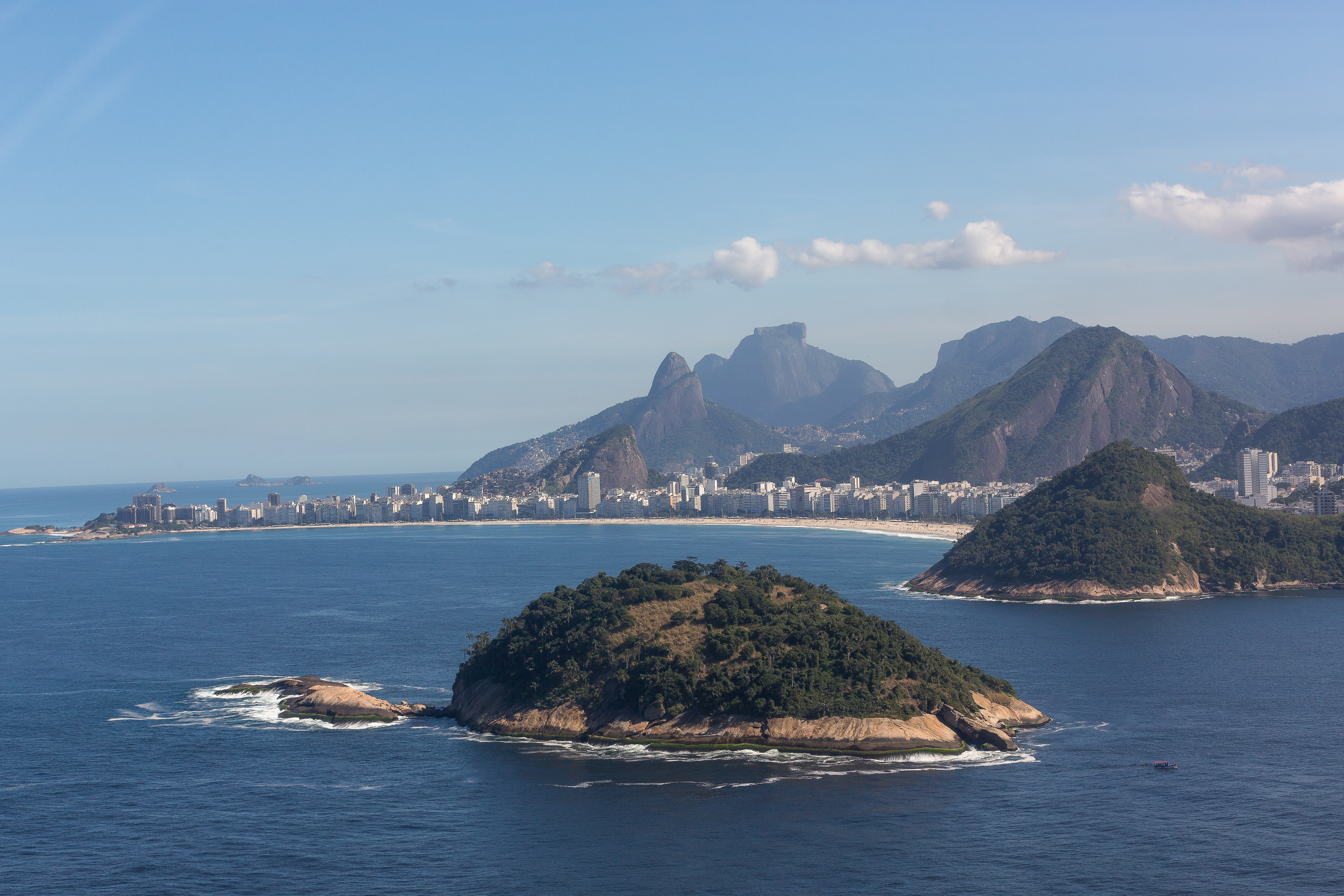
View of the island with Copacabana beach on the background

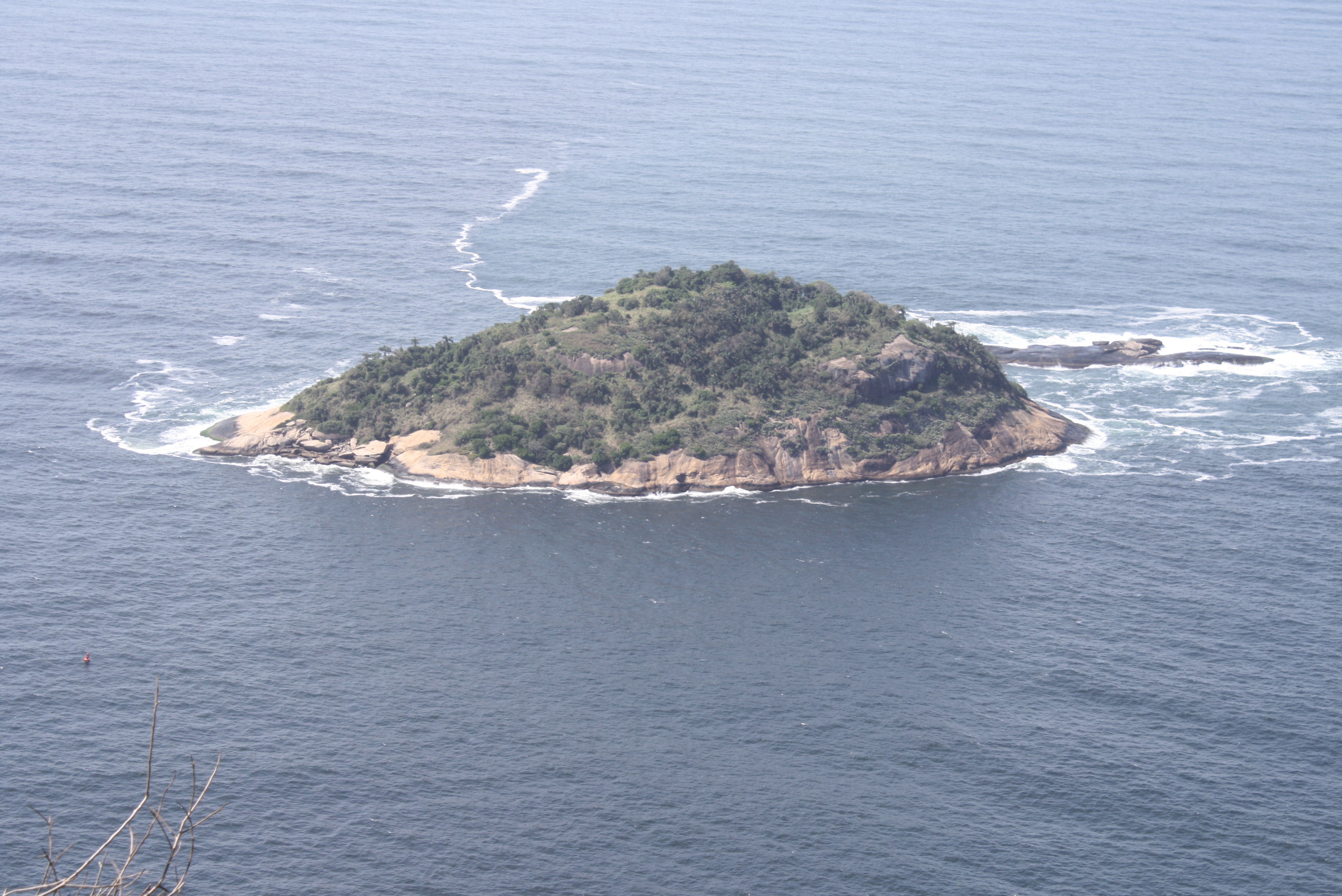
Northern side of the island, as seen from Sugarloaf Mountain

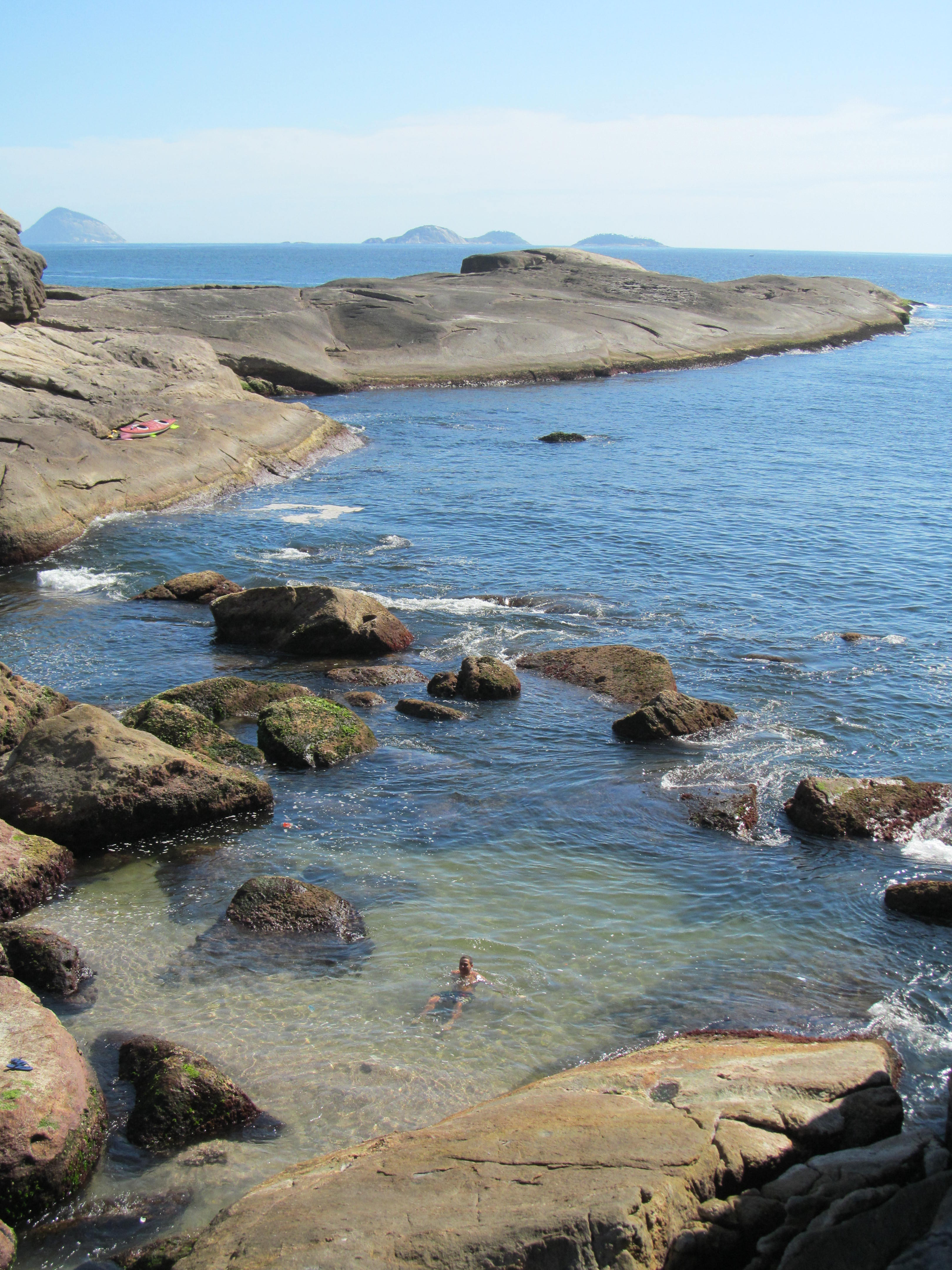
Southern shore of the island, with peduncle in view

== See also ==
- Ilhas Cagarras, a similarly uninhabited archipelago near the island
