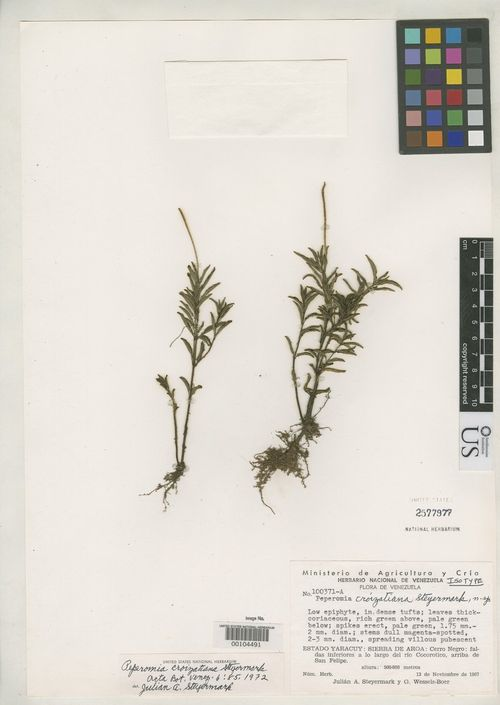

Scientific classification
- Kingdom: Plantae
- Clade: Tracheophytes
- Clade: Angiosperms
- Clade: Magnoliids
- Order: Piperales
- Family: Piperaceae
- Genus: Peperomia
- Species: P. croizatiana

Binomial name
- Peperomia croizatiana Steyerm.

= Peperomia croizatiana =

Species of epiphyte

Peperomia croizatiana is a species of epiphyte in the genus Peperomia that is endemic in Venezuela. It grows on wet tropical biomes. Its conservation status is Threatened.

== Description ==
The type specimen was collected near Yaracuy, Venezuela at an altitude of 100 meters.

Peperomia croizatiana is an epiphytic herb, and it forms dense, tufted clumps. The stems are erect, 2 to 3 millimeters in diameter, with dark magenta spots and covered in dense, spreading hairs. The leaves are nearly stalkless or have very short petioles only 1.5 to 2 millimeters long. Most leaves are arranged oppositely in pairs, but the uppermost leaves often grow in whorls of three. The leaf blades are thick and leathery, strongly concave or cup-shaped, and pale green on the underside. They are lance-shaped or narrowly elliptic, with a blunt tip, measuring 15 to 26 millimeters long and 4 to 8 millimeters wide, while the lower leaves are shorter. The leaves are covered abundantly with resinous spots and are mostly hairless, except near the edges where there are tiny, flattened, pressed-in hairs. The leaf margins are curved inward. The flower spikes are erect, solitary, and grow at the tips of the stems. They are pale green, up to 10 centimeters long, and 2 millimeters in diameter. The peduncle, is pale green and 1.5 to 2 centimeters long. The central spike axis is hairless. The floral bracts are nearly round, pressed flat against the spike, abundantly covered with resinous spots, and hairless. The stigma is located at the tip and is stalkless.

This species is related to P. ocmarana and P. rhombea. From P. ocmarana, it differs by having tufted stems with spreading hairs, strongly curved-in and concave leaves that are not notched at the tip, and a short flower stalk. From P. rhombea, it differs by having a more rounded leaf tip, narrower leaves, a densely tufted growth habit, and shorter spaces between leaves with noticeably spreading hairs.

== Taxonomy and naming ==
It was described in 1984 by Julian Alfred Steyermark in Acta Botanica Venezuelica, from the specimen collected by Jan Gerard Wessels Boer. The epithet croizatiana honors Léon Croizat, a botanist and biogeographer.

== Distribution and habitat ==
It is endemic in Venezuela. It grows on a epiphyte environment and is a herb. It grows on wet tropical biomes.

== Conservation ==
This species is assessed as Threatened.
