= Gymnodactylus amarali =

Conservation status
- Least Concern (IUCN 3.1)

Scientific classification
- Kingdom: Animalia
- Phylum: Chordata
- Class: Reptilia
- Order: Squamata
- Suborder: Gekkota
- Family: Phyllodactylidae
- Genus: Gymnodactylus
- Species: G. amarali

Binomial name
- Gymnodactylus amarali Barbour, 1925

Synonyms
- Gymnodactylus amarali Barbour, 1925; Gymnodactylus geckoides amarali — Vanzolini, 1953; Gymnodactylus carvalhoi Vanzolini, 2005; Gymnodactylus amarali — Cassimiro & Rodrigues, 2009

Species of lizard

Gymnodactylus amarali is a species of gecko in the family Phyllodactylidae. The species is endemic to Brazil. Their main consumption comes from termites that are found in their environment.

== Etymology ==
The specific name, amarali, is in honor of Brazilian herpetologist Afrânio Pompílio Gastos do Amaral.

== Habitat ==
The preferred natural habitat of G. amarali is savanna. Most commonly, the amarali habitats the Cerrado, a tropical savanna in Brazil.

== Reproduction ==
G. amarali is oviparous.
