= Anotosaura collaris =

Scientific classification
- Kingdom: Animalia
- Phylum: Chordata
- Class: Reptilia
- Order: Squamata
- Family: Gymnophthalmidae
- Genus: Anotosaura
- Species: A. collaris

Binomial name
- Anotosaura collaris Amaral, 1933

Species of lizard

Anotosaura collaris, the collared anotosaura, is a species of lizard in the family Gymnophthalmidae. It is endemic to Brazil.
