= Panopa carvalhoi =

Conservation status
- Least Concern (IUCN 3.1)

Scientific classification
- Kingdom: Animalia
- Phylum: Chordata
- Class: Reptilia
- Order: Squamata
- Family: Scincidae
- Genus: Panopa
- Species: P. carvalhoi

Binomial name
- Panopa carvalhoi (Rebouças-Spieker & Vanzolini, 1990)
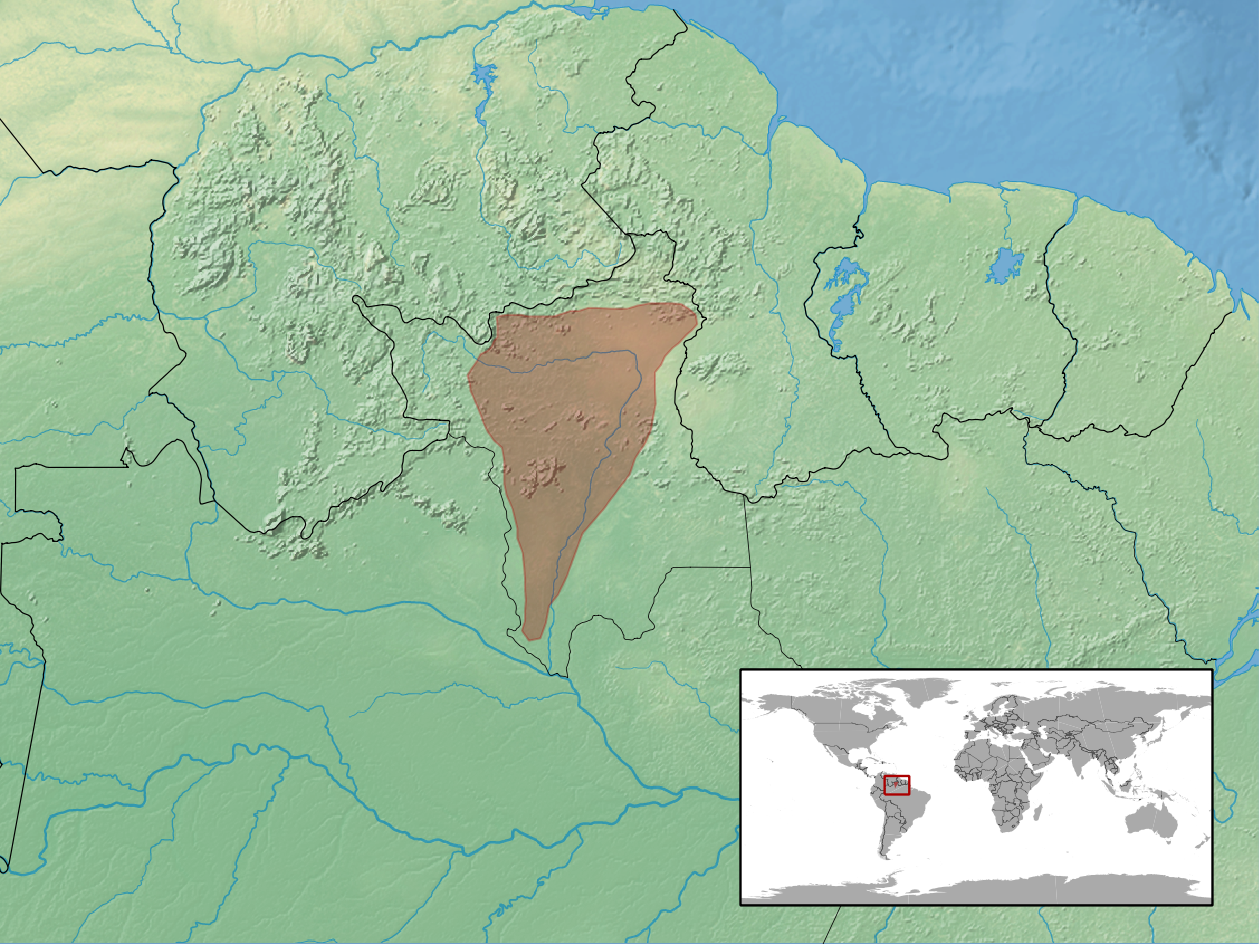

Synonyms
- Mabuya carvalhoi Rebouças-Spieker & Vanzolini, 1990; Panopa carvalhoi — Hedges & Conn, 2012

Species of lizard

Carvalho's mabuya (Panopa carvalhoi) is a species of skink, a lizard in the family Scincidae. The species is native to northern South America.

== Etymology ==
The specific name, carvalhoi, is in honor of Brazilian herpetologist Antenor Leitão de Carvalho.

== Geographic range ==
P. carvalhoi is found in the Brazilian state of Roraima, and in Venezuela.

== Habitat ==
The preferred natural habitats of P. carvalhoi are forest and savanna.

== Reproduction ==
P. carvalhoi is viviparous.
