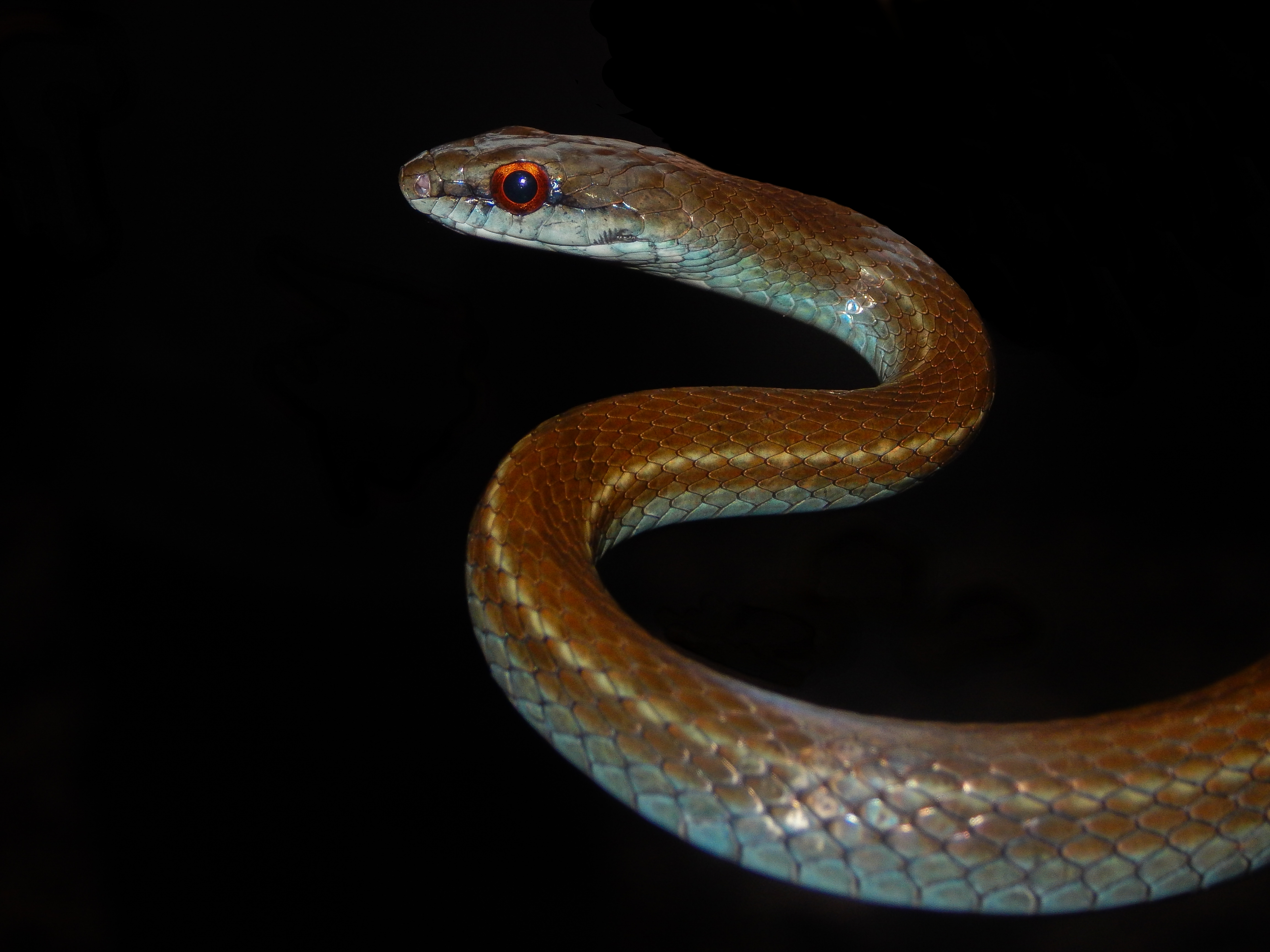

Conservation status
- Least Concern (IUCN 3.1)

Scientific classification
- Kingdom: Animalia
- Phylum: Chordata
- Class: Reptilia
- Order: Squamata
- Suborder: Serpentes
- Family: Colubridae
- Genus: Mastigodryas
- Species: M. danieli

Binomial name
- Mastigodryas danieli Amaral, 1935

Synonyms
- Mastigodryas unicolor Amaral, 1935 (lapsus)

= Mastigodryas danieli =

Species of snake

Mastigodryas danieli, also known commonly as Daniel's tropical racer and guardacamino de Daniel in South American Spanish, is a species of snake in the subfamily Colubrinae of the family Colubridae. The species is endemic to Colombia.

== Etymology ==
The specific name, danieli, is in honor of Colombian monk Brother Daniel Gonzalez Patiño (1909–1988), who was Director of the Museo de Storia Natural, Instituto de La Salle in Bogotá.

== Description ==
A medium-sized species of snake, Mastigodryas danieli may attain a total length (tail included) of 1.6 m (5.2 ft). Dorsally, adults are uniformly brown, with a faint light-colored lateral stripe on each side of the anterior part of the body. The juvenile pattern consists of dark brown blotches on a lighter background, and this pattern gradually disappears as the snake ages.

== Habitat ==
The preferred natural habitat of Mastigodryas danieli is forest, at elevations of 250–2,000 m (820–6,560 ft).

== Behavior ==
Mastigodryas danieli is terrestrial, semi-arboreal, and diurnal.

== Reproduction ==
Mastigodryas danieli is oviparous.
