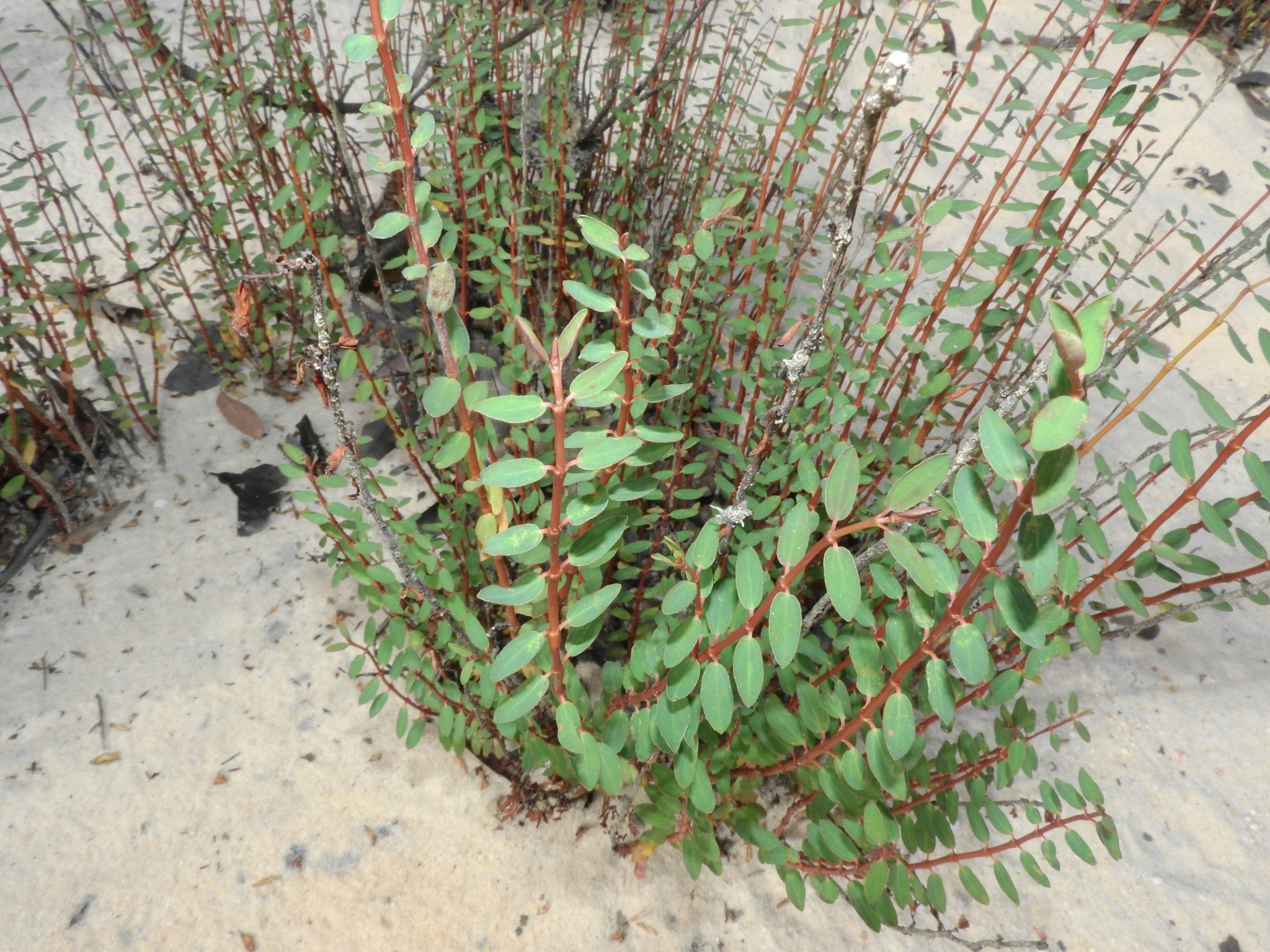

Scientific classification
- Kingdom: Plantae
- Clade: Tracheophytes
- Clade: Angiosperms
- Clade: Eudicots
- Clade: Rosids
- Order: Malpighiales
- Family: Euphorbiaceae
- Genus: Euphorbia
- Species: E. duckei

Binomial name
- Euphorbia duckei (Croizat) Oudejans, 1989

Synonyms
- Chamaesyce duckei Croizat

= Euphorbia duckei =

Species of plant

Euphorbia duckei is a species of plant in the family Euphorbiaceae. This species was first described by Léon Croizat as Chamaesyce duckei, and received its current name from Robertus Cornelis Hilarius Maria Oudejans in 1989. It is found in northern Brazil. The holotype specimen was collected by Adolpho Ducke and is held at the Harvard University Herbarium.
