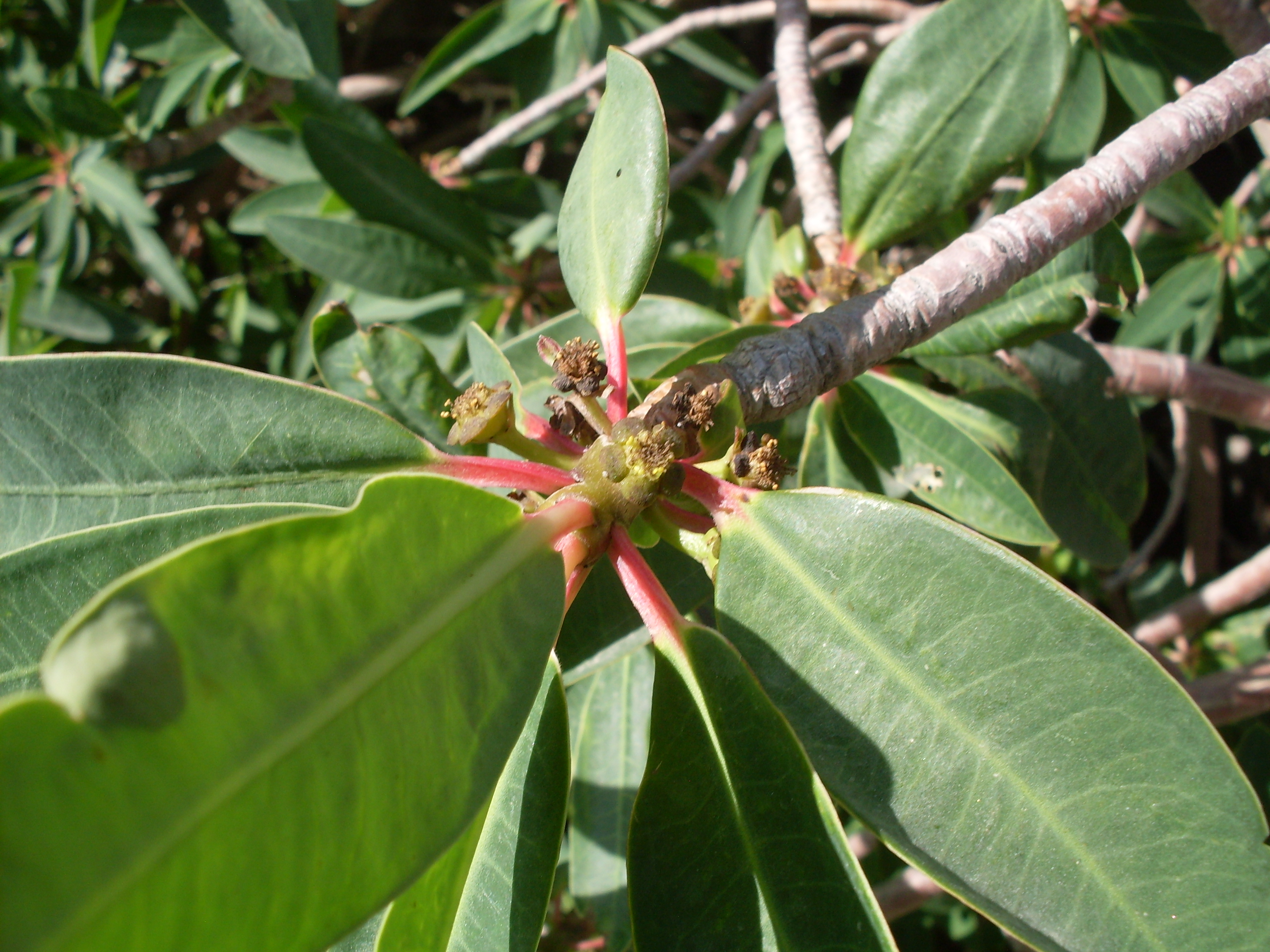

Conservation status
- Vulnerable (IUCN 2.3)

Scientific classification
- Kingdom: Plantae
- Clade: Tracheophytes
- Clade: Angiosperms
- Clade: Eudicots
- Clade: Rosids
- Order: Malpighiales
- Family: Euphorbiaceae
- Genus: Euphorbia
- Species: E. apurimacensis

Binomial name
- Euphorbia apurimacensis Croizat

= Euphorbia apurimacensis =

Species of plant

Euphorbia apurimacensis is a species of plant in the family Euphorbiaceae. It is endemic to Peru.
