= Panopa =

Scientific classification
- Kingdom: Animalia
- Phylum: Chordata
- Class: Reptilia
- Order: Squamata
- Family: Scincidae
- Subfamily: Mabuyinae
- Genus: Panopa; Hedges & Conn, 2012

Species
- Two species, see text

Genus of lizards

Panopa is a genus of skinks, lizards in the family Scincidae. Member species are found in Brazil and Venezuela.

== Species ==
The following two species, listed alphabetically by specific name, are recognized as being valid:

- Panopa carvalhoi (Rebouças-Spieker & Vanzolini, 1990) – Carvalho's mabuya
- Panopa croizati (Horton, 1973) – Horton's mabuya

Nota bene: A binomial authority in parentheses indicates that the species was originally described in a genus other than Panopa.
