= Mastigodryas dorsalis =

Conservation status
- Least Concern (IUCN 3.1)

Scientific classification
- Kingdom: Animalia
- Phylum: Chordata
- Class: Reptilia
- Order: Squamata
- Suborder: Serpentes
- Family: Colubridae
- Genus: Mastigodryas
- Species: M. dorsalis

Binomial name
- Mastigodryas dorsalis (Bocourt, 1890)

Species of snake

Mastigodryas dorsalis, the striped lizard eater, is a species of snake found in Guatemala, Nicaragua, Honduras, El Salvador, and Mexico.
