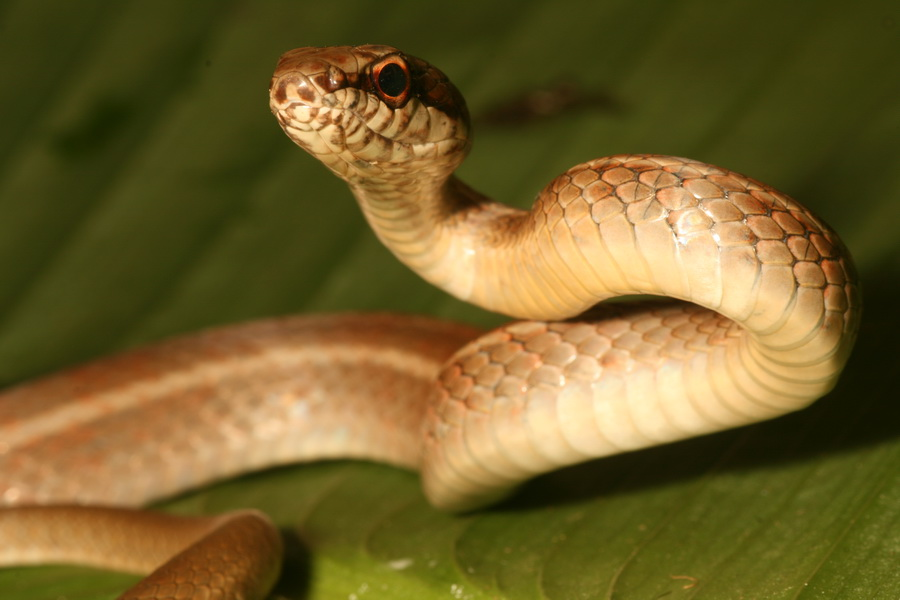
- Mastigodryas boddaerti

Scientific classification
- Kingdom: Animalia
- Phylum: Chordata
- Class: Reptilia
- Order: Squamata
- Suborder: Serpentes
- Family: Colubridae
- Subfamily: Colubrinae
- Genus: Mastigodryas; Amaral, 1934

Species
- see text

= Mastigodryas =

Genus of snakes

Mastigodryas is a genus of snakes in the subfamily Colubrinae of the family Colubridae. Like some other colubrids, Mastigodryas species are commonly called racers. A neotropical genus, members are distributed from Mexico to Argentina and several islands in the Caribbean. Some authorities use the older generic name, Dryadophis, for these species.

== Description ==
Snakes of the genus Mastigodryas are cylindrical or somewhat laterally compressed in shape. The head is distinct from the rest of the body, as in many other colubrids. They have large eyes. They have Duvernoy's glands. The morphology of the hemipenis in various species has been helpful in elucidating their relationships, as little is known about the evolutionary origins of the genus.

== Behavior ==
Mastigodryas species are diurnal and actively forage for their prey.

== Diet ==
The diet of Mastigodryas species is varied. For example, Mastigodryas bifossatus is euryphagic, consuming a wide variety of prey items. A large part of its diet is made up of frogs, and it will also take various mammals, birds, lizards, and other snakes.

== Species ==
There are 13 species that are recognized as being valid. There may be as many as 18 if certain subspecies are elevated to species status, as has been suggested.

Species include:

- Mastigodryas alternatus (Bocourt, 1884)
- Mastigodryas amarali (L.C. Stuart, 1938) – Amaral's tropical racer
- Mastigodryas boddaerti (Sentzen, 1796) – Boddaert's tropical racer
- Mastigodryas bruesi Barbour, 1914 – Barbour's tropical racer
- Mastigodryas cliftoni (Hardy, 1964) – Clifton’s lizard eater
- Mastigodryas danieli Amaral, 1935 – Daniel's tropical racer
- Mastigodryas dorsalis (Bocourt, 1890) – striped lizard eater
- Mastigodryas heathii (Cope, 1876) – Heath's tropical racer
- Mastigodryas melanolomus (Cope, 1868) – salmon-bellied racer
- Mastigodryas moratoi Montingelli & Zaher, 2011
- Mastigodryas pleii (A.M.C. Duméril, Bibron & A.H.A. Duméril, 1854) – Plee's tropical racer
- Mastigodryas pulchriceps (Cope, 1868) – Cope's tropical racer
- Mastigodryas reticulatus (W. Peters, 1863)

Nota bene: A binomial authority in parentheses indicates that the species was originally described in a genus other than Mastigodryas.
