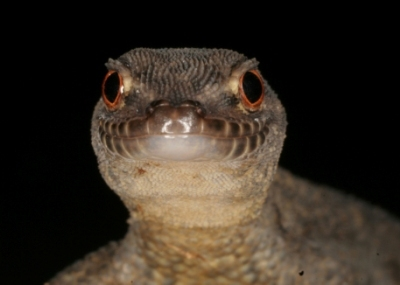

Conservation status
- Least Concern (IUCN 3.1)

Scientific classification
- Kingdom: Animalia
- Phylum: Chordata
- Class: Reptilia
- Order: Squamata
- Suborder: Gekkota
- Family: Phyllodactylidae
- Genus: Gymnodactylus
- Species: G. darwinii

Binomial name
- Gymnodactylus darwinii (Gray, 1845)

Synonyms
- Cubinia darwinii Gray, 1845; Gymnodactylus girardi Steindachner, 1869; Gonatodes helgae Amaral, 1950; Gymnodactylus geckoides darwinii — Vanzolini, 1953; Gymnodactylus darwinii — Vanzolini, 1982

= Gymnodactylus darwinii =

Species of lizard

Gymnodactylus darwinii is a species of gecko in the family Phyllodactylidae. The species is endemic to Brazil.

== Etymology ==
The specific name, darwinii, is in honor of English naturalist Charles Darwin.

== Geographic range ==
G. darwinii is found in eastern Brazil.

== Habitat ==
The preferred natural habitats of G. darwinii are forest and shrubland.

== Description ==
Adults of G. darwinii have a snout-to-vent length of about 3.5 cm (1.4 in).

== Diet ==
G. darwinii preys upon isopods, orthopterans, and other small arthropods.

== Reproduction ==
G. darwinii is oviparous. Communal nesting has been observed.
