= G. darwini =

G. darwini may refer to:

- Gabaza darwini
- Galapagoleon darwini
- Gibbosaverruca darwini
- Gonatocerus darwini
- Gryllus darwini, Otte & Peck, 1997, a cricket species in the genus Gryllus
- Grypotherium darwini, a synonym for Mylodon darwini, an extinct giant ground sloth species

== See also ==
- G. darwinii (disambiguation)
- Darwini (disambiguation)
