= Mastigodryas reticulatus =

Conservation status
- Near Threatened (IUCN 3.1)

Scientific classification
- Kingdom: Animalia
- Phylum: Chordata
- Class: Reptilia
- Order: Squamata
- Suborder: Serpentes
- Family: Colubridae
- Genus: Mastigodryas
- Species: M. reticulatus

Binomial name
- Mastigodryas reticulatus (W. Peters, 1863)

Species of correct

Mastigodryas reticulatus is a species of snake found in Ecuador and Peru.
