= Mastigodryas amarali =

Conservation status
- Vulnerable (IUCN 3.1)

Scientific classification
- Kingdom: Animalia
- Phylum: Chordata
- Class: Reptilia
- Order: Squamata
- Suborder: Serpentes
- Family: Colubridae
- Genus: Mastigodryas
- Species: M. amarali

Binomial name
- Mastigodryas amarali (L.C. Stuart, 1938)

Species of snake

Mastigodryas amarali, Amaral's tropical racer, is a species of snake found in Trinidad and Tobago and Venezuela.
