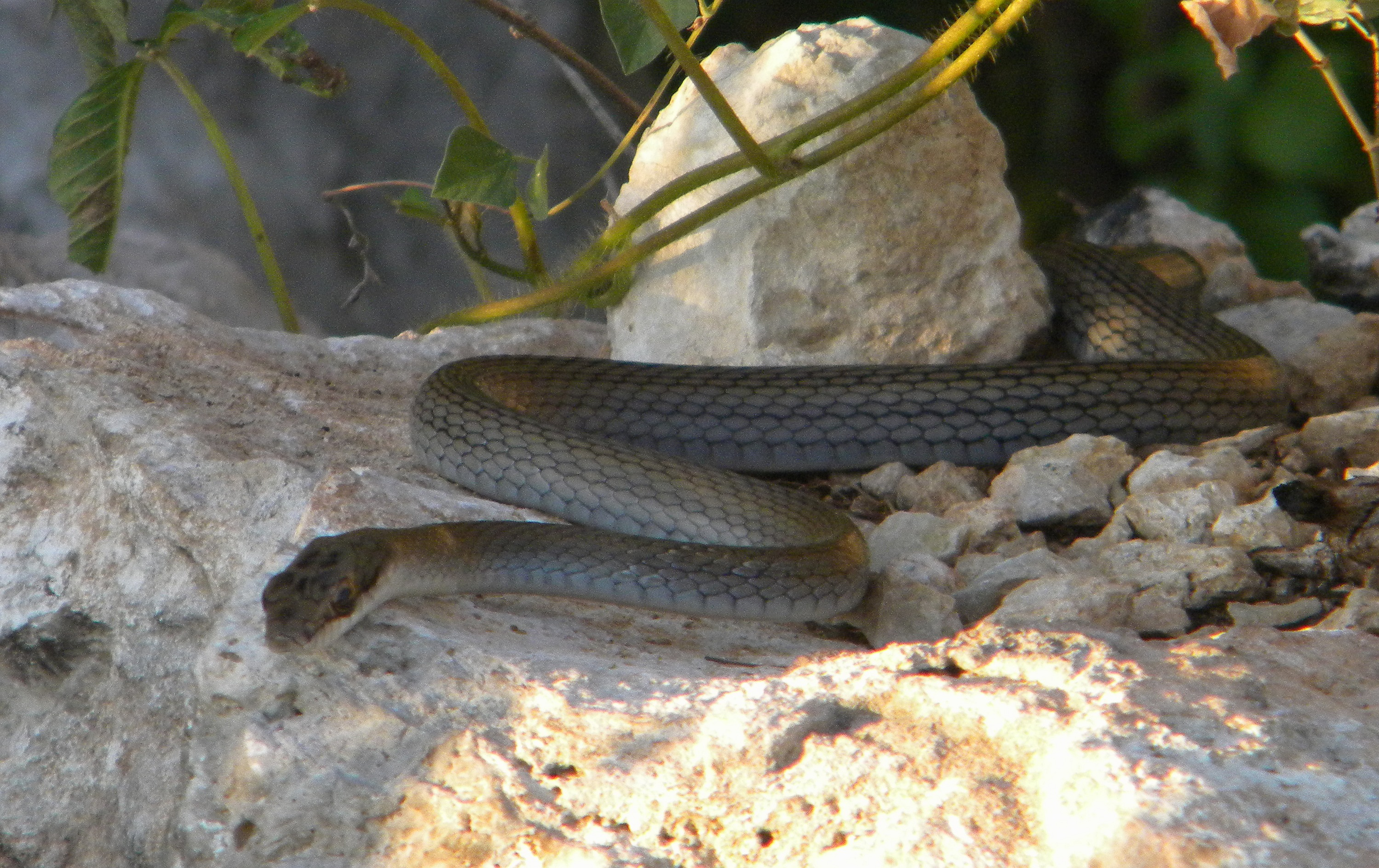

Conservation status
- Least Concern (IUCN 3.1)

Scientific classification
- Kingdom: Animalia
- Phylum: Chordata
- Class: Reptilia
- Order: Squamata
- Suborder: Serpentes
- Family: Colubridae
- Genus: Mastigodryas
- Species: M. melanolomus

Binomial name
- Mastigodryas melanolomus (Cope, 1868)

= Mastigodryas melanolomus =

Species of snake

Mastigodryas melanolomus, the salmon-bellied racer, is a species of snake found in Mexico, Guatemala, Honduras, Belize, El Salvador, Nicaragua, and Costa Rica.
