= Marcus Pereira =

Brazilian popular music researcher

Marcus Pereira (April 4, 1930 – February 20, 1981) was a Brazilian lawyer, publicist, record producer, and popular music researcher. He became well-known for founding the independent label Discos Marcus Pereira (pt), which released the series Música Popular, containing collections of folk songs that Pereira compiled during his travels across Brazil.

== Biography ==
Pereira created an advertising agency in the 1960s, but later abandoned it to pursue his personal dream of ''rediscovering Brazil through its popular music''. In 1973, he founded his label Marcus Pereira, dedicated to recording names who at the time were overlooked by mainstream record companies, including Cartola, Elomar, and Paulo Vanzolini, as well as to registering regional folk songs. His projects counted on the support of artists like Nara Leão, the group Quinteto Armorial, and the singer Elis Regina. The four-disc collection Música Popular do Nordeste earned him the Estácio de Sá prize, awarded by the Rio de Janeiro Museum of Image and Sound.

Pereira died by suicide in 1981, at age 50.
