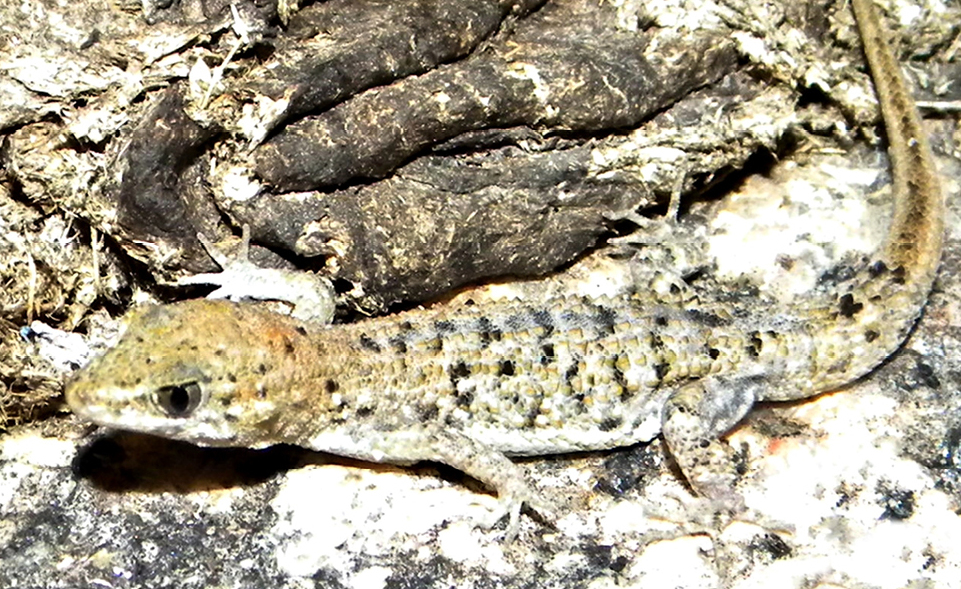

Conservation status
- Least Concern (IUCN 3.1)

Scientific classification
- Kingdom: Animalia
- Phylum: Chordata
- Class: Reptilia
- Order: Squamata
- Suborder: Gekkota
- Family: Phyllodactylidae
- Genus: Gymnodactylus
- Species: G. geckoides

Binomial name
- Gymnodactylus geckoides Spix, 1825

Synonyms
- Ascalabotes geckoides; Stenodactylus geckoides

= Gymnodactylus geckoides =

Species of lizard

Gymnodactylus geckoides is a species of gecko in the family Phyllodactylidae. It is endemic to Brazil.
