= Mastigodryas heathii =

Conservation status
- Least Concern (IUCN 3.1)

Scientific classification
- Kingdom: Animalia
- Phylum: Chordata
- Class: Reptilia
- Order: Squamata
- Suborder: Serpentes
- Family: Colubridae
- Genus: Mastigodryas
- Species: M. heathii

Binomial name
- Mastigodryas heathii (Cope, 1875)

Synonyms
- Drymobius heathii Cope, 1875; Dryadophis heathii — Stuart, 1939; Dryadophis boddaertii heathii — Schmidt & W. Walker, 1943; Mastigodryas heathii — Lehr, G. Köhler & B. Streit, 2002

Species of snake

Mastigodryas heathii, also known commonly as Heath's tropical racer, is a species of snake in the subfamily Colubrinae of the family Colubridae. The species is native to northwestern South America.

== Etymology ==
The specific name, heathii, is in honor of American physician Edwin Ruthven Heath (1839–1932), who collected herpetological specimens in South America.

== Geographic range ==
M. heathii is found in Ecuador and Peru

== Habitat ==
The preferred natural habitats of M. heathii are desert and forest, at altitudes from sea level to 2,620 m (8,600 ft), and it is also found in cultivated areas.

== Diet ==
M. heathii preys upon frogs, lizards, and rodents.

== Reproduction ==
M. heathi is oviparous.
