= Peugeot-Croizat =

The Peugeot-Croizat was an Italian automobile manufactured from 1906 until 1908.

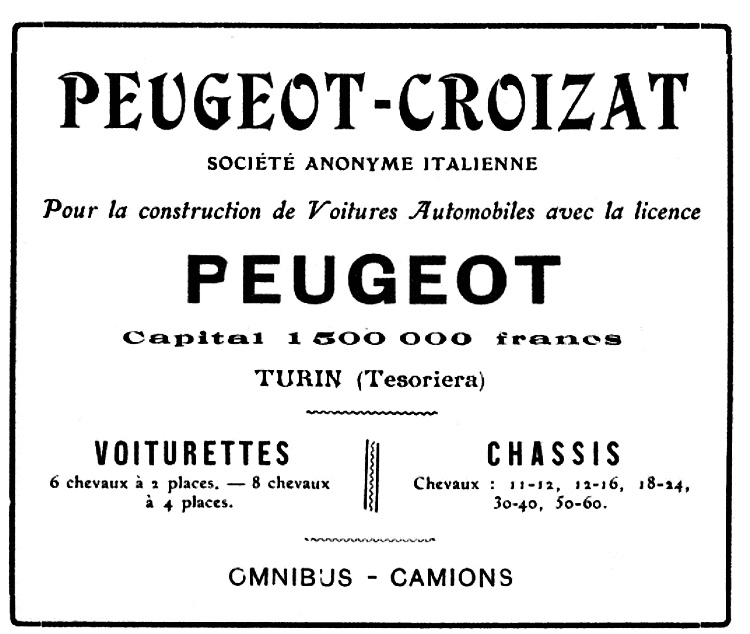
Peugeot-Croizat (1907).

The automobiles were produced by Vittorio Croizat in Turin. Croizat was an engineer and sold Rambler bicycles. On December 27, 1905, he founded the company Automobili Peugeot SA Brevetti for the production of automobiles with the brand name Peugeot Croizat. Three months later the company was renamed SA Italiana per la fabbricazione di Automobili Peugeot Croizat. The president of the corporation was Giovanni Goria Gatti. In November 1907, the company was liquidated and Officine Meccaniche Torinese took over the production.

The company licensed vehicle designs from Peugeot, implementing their own modifications. The smallest model was the 6 hp, which corresponded to the Peugeot Type 69. However, the displacement of the single-cylinder engine was increased to 695 cc. There was also the 12/16 hp, which was based on the Peugeot Type 71. The four-cylinder engine had 2205 cc.
