= Anotosaura =

Scientific classification
- Kingdom: Animalia
- Phylum: Chordata
- Class: Reptilia
- Order: Squamata
- Family: Gymnophthalmidae
- Subfamily: Ecpleopinae
- Genus: Anotosaura; Amaral, 1933

Genus of lizards

Anotosaura is a genus of South American lizards in the family Gymnophthalmidae.

== Geographic range ==
The genus Anotosaura is endemic to Brazil.

== Species ==
The genus Anotosaura contains two valid species.

- Anotosaura collaris Amaral, 1933 - collared anotosaura
- Anotosaura vanzolinia Dixon, 1974 - Vanzolini's anotosaura
