= Mastigodryas moratoi =

Conservation status
- Least Concern (IUCN 3.1)

Scientific classification
- Kingdom: Animalia
- Phylum: Chordata
- Class: Reptilia
- Order: Squamata
- Suborder: Serpentes
- Family: Colubridae
- Genus: Mastigodryas
- Species: M. moratoi

Binomial name
- Mastigodryas moratoi Montingelli & Zaher, 2011

Species of snake

Mastigodryas moratoi is a species of snake found in Brazil and Guyana.
