= Noite Ilustrada =

- Born: Mário de Souza Marques Filho; April 10, 1928
- Origin: Pirapetinga, Minas Gerais, Brazil
- Died: July 28, 2003 (aged 75) Atibaia, São Paulo
- Genres: Samba
- Occupations: Singer, guitarist
- Instrument: Classical guitar
- Formerly of: GRES Portela

Mário Sousa Marques Filho, better known as Noite Ilustrada (April 10, 1928 – July 28, 2003) was a Brazilian singer-songwriter and guitarist.

The nickname was given by Zé Trindade, who commanded the musical revue Noite Ilustrada in Além Paraíba, Minas Gerais, where the young Mario began his career as a guitarist.

== Life and work ==
He was born in Minas Gerais (Pirapetinga) and moved to Rio de Janeiro where he joined the GRES Portela. In 1955, along with samba school GRES Portela, was performing in São Paulo and settled there.

In 1958, hired by the Rádio Nacional São Paulo and TV Paulista, recorded his first album that included the song "Cara de Boboca". Then came:

- O Ilustre' (1962)
- Noite Ilustrada (1963), with "Volta por Cima", song by Paulo Vanzolini that would become his biggest hit
- Noite no Rio (1964), that included another hit record, "A Flor e o Espinho" by Nelson Cavaquinho, Guilherme de Brito and Carlos Zéfiro
- Caminhando (1965)
- Depois do Carnaval (1966)
- Noite Ilustrada (1969)
- Samba sem Problemas (1970)
- Noite Ilustrada (1971), with "Balada Número 7", another hit later recorded by Moacyr Franco
- Noite Interpreta Marques Filho
- O Irmão do Samba (1973)
- Samba sem Hora Marcada (1974)
- Não Me Deixe Só (1978)
- O Fino do Samba (1981)
- Eu Sou o Samba (1997) – CD

In 1984 he moved to Recife. In 1994, moved to Atibaia, São Paulo, where he lived til his death in 2003, from lung cancer.

He left two unpublished tribute albums, one in honor of Ataulfo Alves and other of Lupicínio Rodrigues.

== Bibliography ==
- HOMEM DE MELO, Zuza; MARCONDES, Marcos. Enciclopédia da Música Popular Brasileira. São Paulo: Publifolha, 2000.
