= Mastigodryas cliftoni =

Conservation status
- Data Deficient (IUCN 3.1)

Scientific classification
- Kingdom: Animalia
- Phylum: Chordata
- Class: Reptilia
- Order: Squamata
- Suborder: Serpentes
- Family: Colubridae
- Genus: Mastigodryas
- Species: M. cliftoni

Binomial name
- Mastigodryas cliftoni (Hardy, 1964)

Species of snake

Mastigodryas cliftoni, Clifton's lizard eater, is a species of snake found in Mexico.
