= Mastigodryas alternatus =

Conservation status
- Least Concern (IUCN 3.1)

Scientific classification
- Kingdom: Animalia
- Phylum: Chordata
- Class: Reptilia
- Order: Squamata
- Suborder: Serpentes
- Family: Colubridae
- Genus: Mastigodryas
- Species: M. alternatus

Binomial name
- Mastigodryas alternatus (Bocourt, 1884)

Species of snake

Mastigodryas alternatus is a species of snake found in Nicaragua, Honduras, Costa Rica, Panama, and Colombia.
