= Samba-canção =

Brazilian music genre

- Stylistic origins: Samba
- Cultural origins: Late 1920s, Brazil

Samba-canção (Portuguese pronunciation: [ˈsɐ̃bɐ kɐ̃ˈsɐ̃w]; literally 'song samba') is, in its most common interpretation, a kind of Brazilian popular song with a slow-paced samba rhythm.

== History ==
It appeared after the World War II, at the end of the 1940s, and practically disappeared in the middle of the 1960s when majority of composers began to present their songs without category denomination. The name is somewhat arbitrary, adopted by the music industry, that is, publishers and record companies, and some composers. Like many popular songs of the world, Samba-canção (plural 'sambas-canções')'s principal theme is the love relationship, typically moaning for a lost love. Tempo is moderate or a little slower. The denomination suggests that the song is more sophisticated, less earthy, than ordinary samba songs.

== Composition ==
It has, in most cases, two parts. They are repeated totally. It almost always has a small instrumental introduction, and sometimes a short additional ending (coda). Frequently in the repetition, the first part is played by musicians and the second sung. The musical accompaniment can be anything, from piano solo or guitar duet to jazz-style big band or philharmonic orchestra. In these cases, samba rhythm was provided mainly by a drum player.

It maintains a Brazilian flavor, more or less, but is strongly influenced by American popular songs in every way. Some were influenced by Argentine-Uruguayan tango and Cuban-Mexican bolero.

Under the denomination 'Samba-canção' there have been many hit tunes. Several have the 'classic' or 'standard' status in the history of Brazilian popular music. The name has become obsolete because the public prefers to call them sambas. Today they are a part of MPB.

== Popular songs ==
The most renowned tunes published officially with the denomination 'samba-canção' are as follows.

- Year 1945 - Dora (Lyrics and music by Dorival Caymmi/First public performance or recording by himself)
- 46 - Saia do caminho (Custódio Mesquita & Eduardo Rui/Aracy de Almeida) - Copacabana (João de Barro & Albero Ribeiro/Dick Farney)
- 47 - Marina (Dorival Caymmi/himself) / Nervos do aço (Lupicínio Rodrigues/Francisco Alves)
- 48 - Caminhemos (Herivelto Martins/Francisco Alves) Also well known afterward by a Spanish-language version with the rhythm of bolero.
- 50 - Errei sim (Ataulfo Alves/Dalva de Oliveira)
- 51 - Vingança (Lupicínio Rodrigues/Linda Batista) Also well known afterward by a Spanish-language version with the rhythm of tango.
- 52 - Ninguém me ama (Antônio Maria & Fernando Lobo/Nora Ney) - Risque (Ary Barroso/Hermínia Silva) Originally performed as 'fado'. Also well known afterward by a Spanish-language version with the rhythm of bolero.
- 53 - Ronda (Paulo Vanzolini)
- 55 - Folha morta (Ary Barroso/Jamelão) / Duas contas (Garoto/Garoto-Fafá Lemos-Chiquinho do Accordion)
- 56 - Só louco (Dorival Caymmi/himself) / Resposta (Maysa/herself) /
- 57 - Ouça (Maysa/herself) / Por causa de você (Dolores Duran & Tom Jobim/Roberto Luna?) / Se todos fossem iguais a você (Tom Jobim & Vinicius de Moraes/Tito Madi or Sylvia Telles)
- 58 - Estrada do sol (Dolores Duran & Tom Jobim/Agostinho dos Santos) / Meu mundo caiu (Maysa/herself)
- 59 - A noite do meu bem (Dolores Duran/herself) / Dindi (Tom Jobim & Aloysio de Oliveira/Sylvia Telles) / Eu sei que vou te amar (Tom Jobim & Vinicius de Moraes/Albertinho Fortuna)

== Other forms ==
There had been another kind of Samba-canção. In the 1930s, 'samba-canção' was the denomination applied to some sentimental tunes written for musical reviews. They were not many. Some representative sambas-canções of this kind are: No rancho fundo (1931, lyrics and music by Ary Barroso and Lamartine Babo), Na batucada da vida (1934, Ary Barroso and Luiz Peixoto") and Serra da Boa Esperança (1937, Lamartine Babo).
Referring to the "first" samba-canção of this kind, Paulo Tapajós wrote in an LP jacket:

The old modinha has gotten out of fashion. In its place, a new type of Brazilian song appeared telling the misfortunes of love. That led Henrique Vogeler to compose, in 1928, a new musical expression, using the rhythm of samba, but in much slower and much more relaxed tempo. The tune was called Iaiá, but becoming better known as Ai, Ioiô or also Linda Flor. In the piano sheet music the author classified it as "Samba Canção Brasileira" (Samba Brazilian song), fusing the samba with traditional Brazilian song. Afterward the word "Brasileira" disappeared.

Henrique Vogeler (Rio de Janeiro 1888–1944) was a composer-pianist with solid musical education, studied at the National Conservatory, but best known as the composer of popular tunes, and wrote this "first" Samba-canção as an opening number of a review.

The above-mentioned LP contains some oldies, one Cartola composition and contemporary songs usually associated with bossa nova style.
