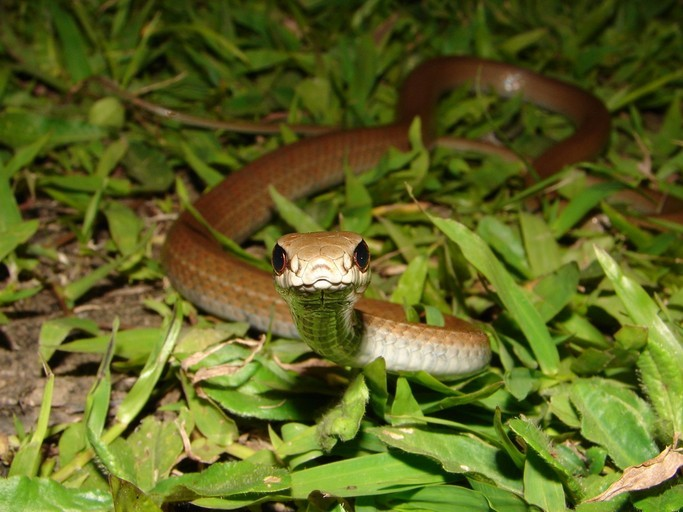

Conservation status
- Least Concern (IUCN 3.1)

Scientific classification
- Kingdom: Animalia
- Phylum: Chordata
- Class: Reptilia
- Order: Squamata
- Suborder: Serpentes
- Family: Colubridae
- Genus: Mastigodryas
- Species: M. boddaerti

Binomial name
- Mastigodryas boddaerti (Sentzen, 1796)

Synonyms
- Coluber boddaertii Sentzen, 1796; Herpetodryas boddaertii — Schlegel, 1837; Drymobius boddaertii — Cope, 1860; Eudryas boddaertii — Stuart, 1933; Dryadophis boddaerti — Stuart, 1939; Mastigodryas boddaerti — Gorzula & Señaris, 1999

= Mastigodryas boddaerti =

Species of snake

Mastigodryas boddaerti, commonly known as Boddaert's tropical racer, is a species of snake in the family Colubridae. The species is native to tropical South America including Trinidad and Tobago.

== Distribution ==
M. boddaerti occurs in Bolivia, Brazil, Colombia, Ecuador, French Guiana, Guyana, Peru, Trinidad and Tobago, and Venezuela.

== Habitat ==
The preferred natural habitat of M. boddaerti is forest, at altitudes of 24–2,600 m (79–8,530 ft).

== Description ==
M. boddaerti changes coloration ontogenetically. Juveniles from Guyana have a brown dorsum with grayish tan bands, with white spots ventrolaterally on anterior ends of the tan bands. The chin and throat are white, with dark brown irregular spots. The venter is tan-colored. Adults are nearly uniform brown dorsally, with traces of bands anteriorly. There is a lateral light tan stripe on the anterior half of the body. The venter is light gray with darker gray smudges on the throat. Individuals from Brazilian Amazonas measured up to 109 centimetres (3 ft 7 in) in snout–vent length.

== Behavior ==
M. boddaerti is diurnal and mainly terrestrial, but it will occasionally climb low vegetation.

== Diet ==
M. boddaerti feeds on young birds, lizards, and mice. Specimens from Brazilian Amazonas fed mostly on lizards, followed by mammals and frogs.

== Reproduction ==
M. boddaerti is oviparous.

== Subspecies ==
Three subspecies are recognized, including the nominotypical subspecies.

- Mastigodryas boddaerti boddaerti (Sentzen, 1796)
- Mastigodryas boddaerti dunni (Stuart, 1933)
- Mastigodryas boddaerti ruthveni (Stuart, 1933)

== Etymology ==
The specific name, boddaerti, is in honor of Dutch naturalist Pieter Boddaert. The subspecific names, dunni and ruthveni, are in honor of American herpetologists Emmett Reid Dunn and Alexander G. Ruthven, respectively.
