= Mastigodryas pleii =

Conservation status
- Least Concern (IUCN 3.1)

Scientific classification
- Kingdom: Animalia
- Phylum: Chordata
- Class: Reptilia
- Order: Squamata
- Suborder: Serpentes
- Family: Colubridae
- Genus: Mastigodryas
- Species: M. pleii

Binomial name
- Mastigodryas pleii (A.M.C. Duméril, Bibron & A.H.A. Duméril, 1854)

Species of snake

Mastigodryas pleii, the Plee's tropical racer, is a species of snake found in Panama, Colombia, and Venezuela.
