= Vittorio Croizat =

Engineer inventor

Victor (Vittorio) Croizat (1856–1915) was an engineer and industrial entrepreneur who figured prominently in the early development of public lighting and the Italian automotive industry in Turin (Torino).

== Early life ==
Croizat was born in Chambéry, France, to Joeseph Croizat and Clémence Vautaret. In December 1889, he married Marie Chaley in Ceyzérieu, France. French engineer Joseph Chaley was a great uncle to both Marie and Victor. Soon after their marriage, Victor and Marie emigrated to Turin, where Victor was employed by the city to develop and implement a street/city lighting plan.

== Career ==
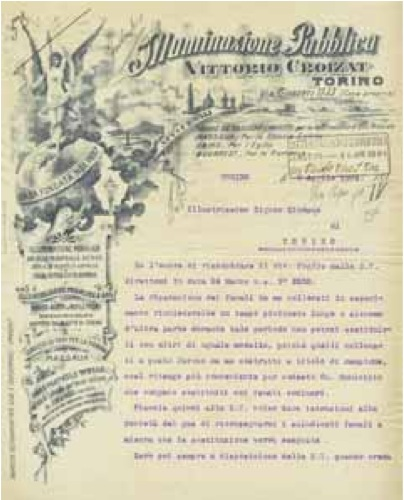
Letterhead for Vittorio Croizat, Turin engineer

=== Lighting ===
Croizat worked as an engineer in Turin, specializing in electric and gas lighting. He obtained multiple patents (in Germany and the United States, at a minimum) for gas lighting and heat exchange apparatuses. He published articles regarding industrial uses of acetylene, Scattered evidence of his work in public lighting indicates that he worked in Constanta, Romania, and on a design for a lighthouse oil lamp at Cape Guardafui in Somalia.

== Transport ==
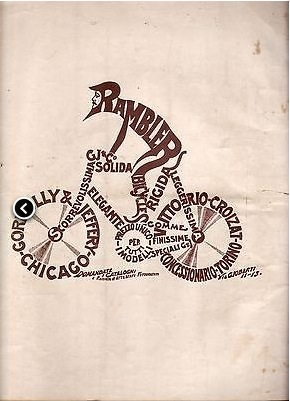
Advertisement for Rambler bicycles; Vittorio Croizat, dealer

Croizat was a pioneer in the automobile industry of northern Italy; after licensing motor designs from Peugeot, he founded Automobili Peugeot SA Brevetti to produce new automobiles under the brand Peugeot-Croizat. The company used modified versions of the Peugeot designs, and operated from 1905 to 1907. Croizat was also a dealer for Rambler bicycles.

Croizat also was an investor in early oil refining efforts in Italy, and owned the Piano d'Orta oil refinery.

== Personal life ==
Victor and Marie had several children; one, Léon Croizat, became a pioneer in botany and evolutionary theory.
