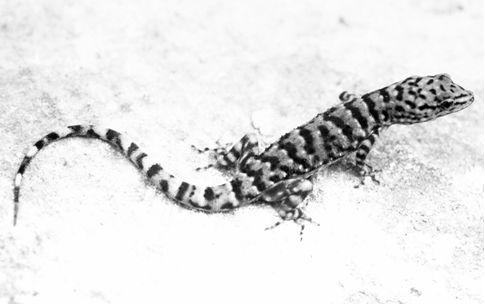
- Gymnodactylus vanzolinii

Scientific classification
- Kingdom: Animalia
- Phylum: Chordata
- Class: Reptilia
- Order: Squamata
- Suborder: Gekkota
- Family: Phyllodactylidae
- Genus: Gymnodactylus; Spix, 1825

= Gymnodactylus =

Genus of lizards

Gymnodactylus is a genus of Brazilian geckos, commonly known as naked-toed geckos, in the family Phyllodactylidae.

== Species ==
The following five species are recognized as being valid.

- Gymnodactylus amarali Barbour, 1925
- Gymnodactylus darwinii (Gray, 1845)
- Gymnodactylus geckoides Spix, 1825
- Gymnodactylus guttulatus Vanzolini, 1982
- Gymnodactylus vanzolinii Cassimiro & Rodrigues, 2009

Nota bene: A binomial authority in parentheses indicates that the species was originally described in a genus other than Gymnodactylus.
