= Mastigodryas pulchriceps =

Conservation status
- Least Concern (IUCN 3.1)

Scientific classification
- Kingdom: Animalia
- Phylum: Chordata
- Class: Reptilia
- Order: Squamata
- Suborder: Serpentes
- Family: Colubridae
- Genus: Mastigodryas
- Species: M. pulchriceps

Binomial name
- Mastigodryas pulchriceps (Cope, 1868)

Species of snake

Mastigodryas pulchriceps , Cope's tropical racer , is a species of snake found in Ecuador, Colombia, and Peru.
