= Panbiogeography =

Cartographical approach to biogeography

Panbiogeography, originally proposed by the French-Italian scholar Léon Croizat (1894–1982) in 1958, is a cartographical approach to biogeography that plots distributions of a particular taxon or group of taxa on maps, and connects the disjunct distribution areas or collection localities together with lines called tracks , regarding vicariance as the primary mechanism for the distribution of organisms rather than dispersal. While Panbiogeography influenced development of modern biogeography, the ideas in their original form are not considered mainstream biogeographical theory, and the theory was described in 2007 as "almost moribund".

== Tracks ==
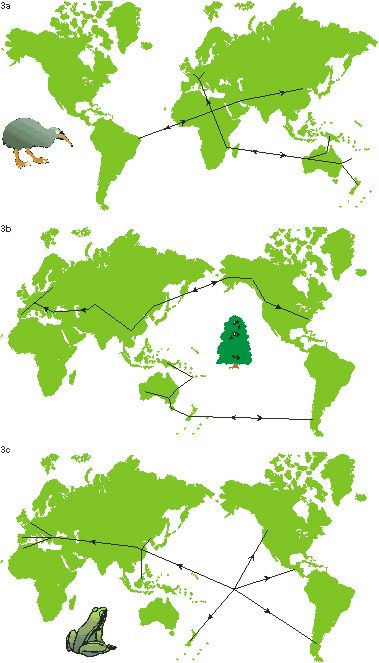
Panbiogeographic tracks of the ratite birds, the southern beech Nothofagus, and the New Zealand frog Leiopelma

A track is a representation of the spatial form of a species distribution and can give insights into the spatial processes that generated that distribution. Crossing of an ocean or sea basin or any other major tectonic structure (e.g. a fault zone) by an individual track constitutes a baseline.

Individual tracks are superimposed, and if they coincide according to a specified criterion (e.g. shared baselines or compatible track geometries), the resulting summary lines are considered generalized (or standard) tracks. Generalized tracks suggest the pre-existence of ancestral biotas, which subsequently become fragmented by tectonic and/or climate change. The area where two or more generalized tracks intersect is called node. It means that different ancestral biotic and geological fragments interrelate in space/time, as a consequence of terrain collision, docking, or suturing, thus constituting a composite area. A concentration of numerical, genetical or morphological diversity within a taxon in a given area constitutes a main massing.

Panbiogeography was first conceived by Croizat and further applied by researchers in New Zealand and Latin America. Panbiogeography provides a method for analyzing the geographic (spatial) structure of distributions in order to generate predictions about the evolution of species and other taxa in space and time.

Panbiogeographic key concepts of track, node, baseline, and main massing have shown to be powerful analytical tools, especially following the mathematical formalization of these concepts with the development of quantitative panbiogeography. Such developments were based on the application of concepts and methods from graph theory, for example minimum spanning trees to depict individual tracks in a more rigorous way, clique analysis to identify standard tracks, and nodal analysis to determine the precise location of panbiogeographic nodes.

Panbiogeography emphasizes the analysis of raw locality and broader distribution data for taxa, and may thus benefit from modern technological advances for the collection, storage, and analysis of such data, as are online biodiversity databases of georeferenced records, (Note: Biodiversity databases include GBIF, VertNet, iDigBio, OBIS.) the Global Positioning System (GPS) and Geographic Information Systems (GIS) technology. Furthermore, panbiogeographers have suggested their paradigm may also be useful to address the critical issue of global biodiversity conservation in a potentially fast and cost-effective way.

== Reception ==
Panbiogeography has generally been dismissed by mainstream biologists, and it has been described as "almost moribund" and as having "fallen by the wayside" in biogeography following widespread criticism. Robert H. Cowie, writing in a book review in Heredity stated "Panbiogeography seems to me at best to offer little new insight, at worst to be fundamentally flawed" criticising panbiogeographers for not placing enough emphasis on phylogenetics, which Cowie states is "the underpinning of any biogeographical analysis". Subsequent researchers have also criticised panbiogeography and argued that the approach is detrimental to biogeography as a scientific discipline.
