= Nora Ney =

Brazilian singer (1922–2003)

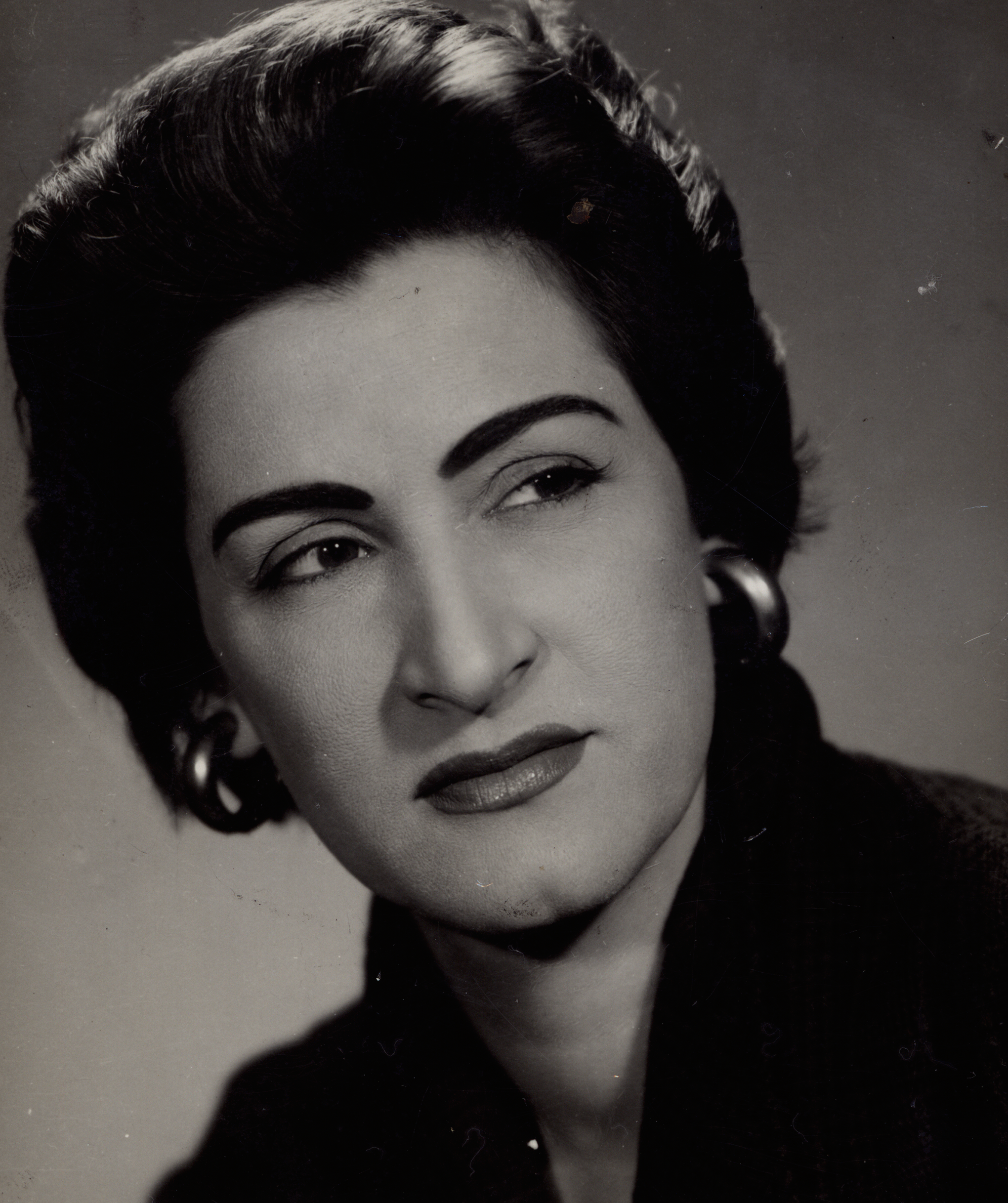
- Nora Ney in 1961

Background information
- Born: Iracema de Sousa Ferreira; March 20, 1922; Rio de Janeiro, Brazil
- Died: October 2003 (aged 81) Rio de Janeiro, Brazil
- Genres: Samba-canção, Brazilian rock

Nora Ney (born Iracema de Sousa Ferreira, Rio de Janeiro, March 20, 1922 – Rio de Janeiro, October 2003) was a Brazilian singer. She is also the most notable singer of the samba-canção music style and a pioneer of the Brazilian rock.

== Biography ==
Ney first approached music by playing guitar by herself. Her father, in order to motivate her, offered the instrument as a birthday gift.

Along with Maysa Matarazzo, Ângela Maria and Dolores Duran, Ney is considered one of the greatest samba-canção singers who became popular in the 30s. Her music was often compared to bolero for the featured exaltation and exploration of romantic love or the suffering of an unrequited love affair was also called "elbow ache" (jealousy, heart ache). Samba-canção preceded bossa nova but came from American jazz and had more refined, gentle and soft melodies and interpretations, in detriment of those resented, melancholic ones. "Nina Ney was melodramatic and yet emotionally cool at the same time," noted musicologist Bryan McCann of her style.

She began her career in 1950 and in 1953 was already one of the greatest singers of the Brazilian Radio Era, interpreting Dorival Caymmi, Noel Rosa, Ary Barroso, and Antonio Carlos Jobim. In 1952 she recorded her first LP for the record label Continental Records, titled Menino da rua. Despite being a notable samba-canção interpreter, Nora Ney became one of the pioneers of the Brazilian rock by recording the first rock LP in the country: the Brazilian version of "Rock Around the Clock" by Bill Haley & His Comets (soundtrack of Sementes da Violência movie) in October 1955. After only one week, the song became a hit, and began a trend for Brazilian singers making covers of rock songs.

Ney's second marriage was to singer Jorge Goulart; their daughter, Vera Lúcia, became Miss Brazil in 1963. Ney was forced into exile after the 1964 Brazilian coup d'état due to Goulart's political involvement with the Communist Party of Brazil.

== Discography ==
- Menino grande/Quanto tempo faz (1952) Continental 78
- Amor, meu grande amor/Ninguém me ama (1952) Continental 78
- Luzes da ribalta/Felicidade (1953) Todamérica 78
- De cigarro em cigarro/Onde anda você (1953) Continental 78
- Índia/Preconceito (1953) Continental 78
- Bar da noite/É tão gostoso seu moço (1953) Continental 78
- Deixa-me (1953) Continental 78
- Que saudade é esta/Canção de Portugal (1954) Continental 78
- Que saudade é esta/Canção de Portugal (1954) Continental 78
- Aves daninhas/O que foi que eu fiz (1954) Continental 78
- Duas lacraias/Solidão (1954) Continental 78
- Gosto, gosto de você/Não diga não (1955) Continental 78
- Vou de tamanco/Se a saudade me apertar... (1955) Continental 78
- Madrugada, três e cinco/Vamos falar de saudade (1955) Continental 78
- Doce mãezinha/Ó meu papai (1955) Continental 78
- O morro/Dois tristonhos (1955) Continental 78
- Ronda das horas/Ciuminho grande (1955) Continental 78
- Por que choras?/Meu lamento (1955) Continental 78
- Quatro motivos/Sem ninguém (1955) Todamérica 78
- Palavra de rei (1955) Todamérica 5593
- Canta Nora Ney (1955) Continental LP
- Eu ri de choar/Quando o amor vai embora (1956) Continental 78
- Só louco/Não há mais segredo (1956) Continental 78
- Rififi/Eu vivo tão só (1956) Continental 78
- Se o negócio é sofrer/Não vou chorar (1957) Continental 78
- Franqueza/Eu e Deus (1957) Continental 78
- Saudade da Bahia/Chove lá fora (1957) Continental 78
- São dois loucos/Eu sofro tanto (1957) Continental 78
- Duas notas, nada mais/Quem é ela? (1958) Continental 78
- Vai, mas vai mesmo/Castigo (1958) RCA Victor 78
- Solidão/Pra falar com meus botões (1958) RCA Victor 78
- Nora Ney (1958) RCA Victor LP
- Sorria/Muito agradecida (1959) RCA Victor 78
- Meu amor não me deixou/Canção do mal que faz bem (1959) RCA Victor 78
- Razões/Duas almas (1959) RCA Victor 78
- Você nasceu pro mal/Teleco teco nº 2 (1960) RCA Victor 78
- Mentira/Saudade mentirosa (1960) RCA Victor 78
- Ninguém me ama (1960) RCA Victor LP
- Desencontro/Pra que voltar? (1961) Continental 78
- João da Silva/E a vida continua... (1962) Mocambo 78
- Mundo diferente/Hora final (1963) Mocambo 78
- Mudando de conversa (1968) LP
- Tire seu sorriso do caminho, que eu quero passar com a minha dor (1972) Som Livre LP
- Jubileu de prata - Nora Ney e Jorge Goulart (1977) Som Livre LP
- Meu cantar é tempestade de saudade (1987) 3M LP
- As eternas cantoras do rádio (1991) CID CD
- Nora Ney (1993) BMG CD
- Mestres da MPB - Nora Ney (1994) CD
- Acervo especial - Nora Ney (1994)
- A música brasileira deste século por seus autores e intérpretes (2000) CD
- Amor, meu grande
