= Anotosaura vanzolinia =

Conservation status
- Least Concern (IUCN 3.1)

Scientific classification
- Kingdom: Animalia
- Phylum: Chordata
- Class: Reptilia
- Order: Squamata
- Family: Gymnophthalmidae
- Genus: Anotosaura
- Species: A. vanzolinia

Binomial name
- Anotosaura vanzolinia Dixon, 1974

Synonyms
- Anotosaura collaris vanzolinia Dixon, 1974; Anotosaura vanzolinia — Vanzolini, 1976

Species of lizard

Anotosaura vanzolinia, also known commonly as Vanzolini's anotosaura, is a species of lizard in the family Gymnophthalmidae. The species is endemic to Brazil.

== Etymology ==
The specific name, vanzolinia, is in honor of Brazilian herpetologist and composer Paulo Vanzolini.

== Geographic range ==
A. vanzolinia is found in extreme eastern Brazil, in the Brazilian states of Bahia, Paraíba, and Pernambuco.

== Diet ==
The diet of A. vanzolinia consists of ants, termites, and other arthropods of the edaphic microfauna. Some arthropods include members of Arachnida, Crustacea, Hexapoda, and Diploda.

== Habitat ==
The preferred natural habitat of A. vanzolinia is sparse shrubby vegetation, dense shrubby vegetation, sparse arboreal vegetation, dense arboreal vegetation, sparse shrubby-arboreal vegetation, and dense shrubby-arboreal vegetation. It dwells within leaf litter around shrubs, leaf litter among bromeliads, leaf litter around rocky outcrops, and isolated leaf litter.

== Reproduction ==
A. vanzolinia is oviparous. Clutch size is two eggs.
