= Panopa croizati =

Conservation status
- Critically Endangered (IUCN 3.1)

Scientific classification
- Kingdom: Animalia
- Phylum: Chordata
- Class: Reptilia
- Order: Squamata
- Family: Scincidae
- Genus: Panopa
- Species: P. croizati

Binomial name
- Panopa croizati (Horton, 1973)

Synonyms
- Mabuya croizati Horton, 1973; Panopa croizati — Hedges & Conn, 2012

Species of lizard

Horton's mabuya (Panopa croizati) is a species of skink, a lizard in the family Scincidae. The species is endemic to Venezuela.

== Etymology ==
The specific name, croizati, is in honor of Italian-born botanist Léon Croizat.

== Habitat ==
The preferred natural habitat of P. croizati is rocky areas in forest, at altitudes of 1,800–2,400 m (5,900–7,900 ft).

== Behavior ==
P. croizati is terrestrial and diurnal

== Reproduction ==
P. croizati is viviparous.
