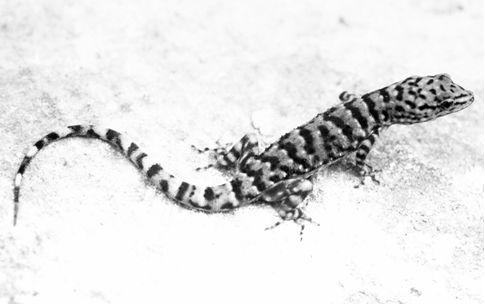

Conservation status
- Data Deficient (IUCN 3.1)

Scientific classification
- Kingdom: Animalia
- Phylum: Chordata
- Class: Reptilia
- Order: Squamata
- Suborder: Gekkota
- Family: Phyllodactylidae
- Genus: Gymnodactylus
- Species: G. vanzolinii

Binomial name
- Gymnodactylus vanzolinii Cassimiro & Rodrigues, 2009

= Gymnodactylus vanzolinii =

Species of lizard

Gymnodactylus vanzolinii is a species of gecko in the family Phyllodactylidae. The species is endemic to Brazil.

== Etymology ==
The specific name, vanzolinii, is in honor of Brazilian herpetologist and samba composer Paulo Vanzolini.

== Geographic range ==
G. vanzolinii is endemic to the Brazilian state of Bahia.

== Reproduction ==
The mode of reproduction of G. vanzolinii is unknown.
