= Zuza Homem de Mello =

Brazilian journalist (1933–2020)

José Eduardo Homem de Mello, best known as Zuza Homem de Mello (20 September 1933 – 4 October 2020) was a Brazilian musicologist and journalist, specialized in the Brazilian popular music history.

== Life and career ==
Homem de Mello was born in 1933, in São Paulo. During his youth he worked as a professional bass player in nightclubs in the city. In 1955, encouraged by his mother, he abandoned the engineering course to dedicate himself to music. The next year he started writing columns about jazz for the newspapers Folha da Noite and Folha da Manhã. In 1957, he attended Tanglewood School of Jazz, studying under Ray Brown and other musicians. From 1957 to 1958, he studied musicology at New York's Juilliard School.

From 1958 he began giving lectures and courses on Brazilian popular music and jazz in Brazil and abroad, having also been a judge on some of the country's most important music festivals.

Back in Brazil in 1959, Zuza - as he became known in the music scene - joined TV Record, where he stayed for about ten years. Throughout this period, he worked as a sound engineer in the channel's music programs and festivals, and as a booker in the hiring of international stars.

Between 1977 and 1988, he focused his activities on radio and print, producing and presenting the Programa do Zuza, on Rádio Jovem Pan AM; he also worked as a popular music critic for the newspaper O Estado de S. Paulo, wrote for the magazines Som 3, Nova and other publications in Brazil and abroad. In 1997, he coordinated the Enciclopédia da Música Brasileira (Encyclopedia of Brazilian Music), and in 1982, alongside Tárik de Souza, he planned and coordinated the third edition of the collection História da Música Popular Brasileira (History of Brazilian Popular Music), by Editora Abril.

Zuza also directed and produced music festivals and artists tours: he directed in the 1970s the series of concerts O Fino da Música, at the Anhembi Convention Center, in São Paulo, featuring artists like Canhoto, Elis Regina, Elizeth Cardoso, João Bosco, Ivan Lins, and Alcione. In the 1980s, he directed the three editions of Guarujá Summer Festival, featuring Jackson do Pandeiro, Patativa do Assaré, Luiz Gonzaga, Jorge Ben Jor, Raul Seixas, Djavan, Beto Guedes and Alceu Valença.

In 1988, he produced Milton Nascimento's Japanese tour; he also directed Milton and Gilberto Gil in the Basf Chrome Music concert series (1989).

In 2018, he was elected for the chair n.º 17 of Academia Paulista de Letras, replacing the Portuguese literature scholar Massaud Moisés. He was the subject of the 2019 documentary Zuza Homem de Jazz, directed by Janaína Dalri.

=== Death ===
Zuza died on 4 October 2020, aged 87, 2020, at his apartment in São Paulo, affected by a myocardial infarction during his sleep. The previous week he finished writing the biography of musician João Gilberto.

== Books published ==
- Música popular brasileira cantada e contada (1976)
- A canção no tempo (two volumes), co-authored with Jairo Severiano (Editora 34, 1997-98)
- João Gilberto (Publifolha, Coleção Folha Explica, 2001)
- A Era dos Festivais (Editora 34, 2003)
- Música nas veias:memórias e ensaios (Editora 34, 2007)
- Eis aqui os bossa nova (WMF Martins Fontes, 2008)
- Música com Z (Editora 34, 2014)
- Copacabana: a trajetória do samba-canção (Editora 34 and Edições Sesc, 2017)
