= Afrânio do Amaral =

Brazilian herpetologist (1894–1982)

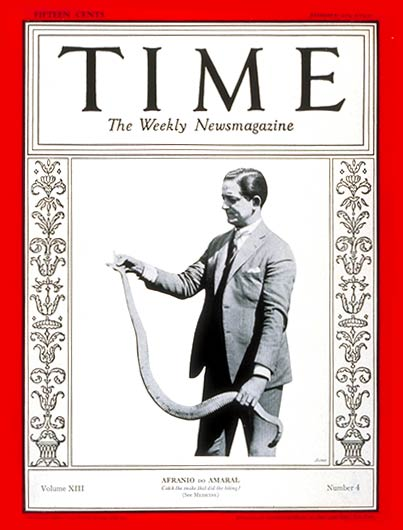
Amaral on the cover of Time, 1929

Afrânio Pompílio Bastos do Amaral (1 December 1894 in Belém – 29 November 1982 in São Paulo) was a Brazilian herpetologist.

As a youngster, he collected snakes for Augusto Emilio Goeldi (1859-1917). He studied medicine in Salvador, Bahia, later finding employment at the Instituto Butantan in São Paulo. Here, his work involved research and production of anti-venom serum. In 1921 he succeeded Vital Brazil (1865-1950) as director of the Instituto Butantan. During his career, he was the author of over 450 published works.

== Taxa ==
Amaral was the taxonomic authority of several herpetological genera (e.g., Mastigodryas, Anotosaura, Colobodactylus) and of around 40 new species (Listing of species described by Amaral at French Wikipedia).

The following species are named in his honor:

- Gymnodactylus amarali Barbour, 1925
- Caaeteboia amarali (Wettstein, 1930)
- Mastigodryas amarali (Stuart, 1938)

Also, the following subspecies is named in his honor:

- Boa constrictor amarali (Stull, 1932)

== Selected works ==
- "A general consideration of snake poisoning and observations on neotropical pit-vipers", 1925.
- "South American snakes in the collection of the United States National Museum", 1925.
- "Animaes venenosos do Brasil", 1930.
- "Animais veneniferos, venenos e antivenenos", 1945.
- "Linguagem científica", 1976.
- "Serpentes do Brasil: iconografia colorida" [Brazilian snakes: a color iconography], 1977.
