= Léon Croizat =

Italian botanist (1894–1982)

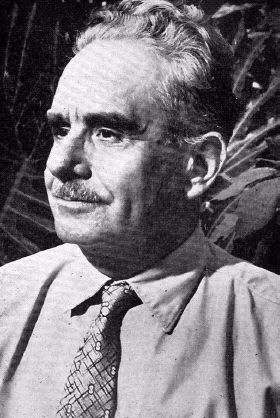
- Croizat in 1964
- Born: Leon Croizat; 16 July 1894
- Died: 30 November 1982 (aged 88)

Léon Camille Marius Croizat (16 July 1894 – 30 November 1982) was a French-Italian scholar and botanist who developed an orthogenetic synthesis of the evolution of biological form over space, in time, which he called panbiogeography.

== Life ==
Croizat was born in Torino, Italy to Vittorio Croizat (aka Victor Croizat) and Maria (Marie) Chaley, who had emigrated to Turin from Chambéry, France. Despite his great aptitude for the natural sciences, Leon studied and received a degree in law from the University of Turin.

Croizat and his family (wife Lucia and two children) emigrated to the United States in 1924; an avid artist, Leon worked selling his artwork for several years, but could not succeed economically as a working artist after the stock market crash of 1929. During the 1930s, Croizat found a job identifying plants as part of a topographic inventory performed in the public parks of New York City. During his visits to the Bronx Botanical Gardens, he became acquainted with Dr. E. D. Merrill. When Merrill was appointed director of the Arnold Arboretum of Harvard University in 1936, he hired Leon as a technical assistant (in 1937.)

Croizat became a prolific student and publisher, studying important aspects of the distribution and evolution of biological species. It was during this time that he began to formulate a novel current of thought in evolutionary theory, opposed in some respects to Darwinism, on the evolution and dispersal of biota over space, through time.

Croizat during the 1950-1951 Franco-Venezuelan Expedition to the sources of the Orinoco River

In 1947, Croizat moved to Venezuela after receiving an invitation from botanist Henri Pittier. Croizat then obtained a position in the Faculty of the Department of Agronomy at the Central University of Venezuela. In 1951 he was promoted and was awarded the title of Professor of Botany and Ecology at the University of the Andes, Venezuela. Between 1951 and 1952 he participated in the Franco-Venezuelan expedition to discover the sources of the Orinoco river. Croizat served with the expedition as a botanist with professor Jose Maria Cruxent.

During his time in Venezuela Croizat divorced his first wife. Croizat was later remarried to his second wife Catalina Krishaber, a Hungarian immigrant. In 1953 Croizat gave up all official academic positions to work full-time researching biology. Croizat and his wife Catalina lived in Caracas until 1976. In 1976 they took over as first directors of the “Jardin Botanico Xerofito” in Coro, a city approximately 400 kilometres West of Caracas. Jardin Botanico Xerofito was a botanical garden which they founded together. Croizat and Catalina worked for six years to establish Jardin Botanico Xerofito.

Croizat died at Coro on 30 November 1982, of a heart attack. During his life, Croizat has published around 300 scientific papers and seven books, amounting to more than 15,000 printed pages. He was honoured by Venezuela with the Henri Pittier Order of Merit in Conservation, and by the government of Italy with the Order of Merit. Croizat is commemorated in the scientific name of a species of lizard, Panopa croizati. Several plant and animal species (and one genus) have been named after Croizat.

== Concepts ==
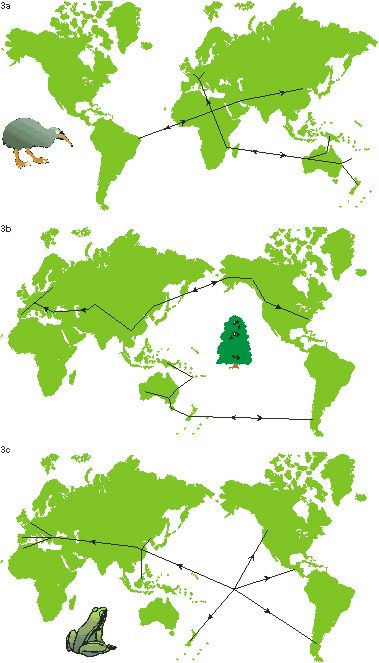
Panbiogeographic tracks of the ratite birds, the southern beech Nothofagus, and the New Zealand frog Leiopelma

Panbiogeography is a discipline based on the analysis of patterns of distribution of organisms. The method analyzes biogeographic distributions through the drawing of tracks, and derives information from the form and orientation of those tracks. A track is a line connecting collection localities or disjunct areas of a particular taxon. Several individual tracks for unrelated groups of organisms form a generalized ('standard') track, where the individual components are relict fragments of an ancestral, more widespread biota fragmented by geological and/or climatic changes. A node arises from the intersection of two or more generalized tracks

In graph theory a track is equated to a minimum spanning tree connecting all localities by the shortest path.

To explain disjunct distributions, Croizat proposed the existence of broadly distributed ancestors that established their range during a period of mobilism, followed by a form-making process over a broad front. Disjunctions are explained as extinctions in the previously continuous range. Orthogenesis is a term used by Croizat, in his words "... in a pure mechanistic sense", which refers to the fact that a variation in form is limited and constrained. Croizat considered organism evolution as a function of time, space and form. Of these three essential factors, space is the one with which biogeography is primarily concerned. However space necessarily interplays with time and form, therefore the three factors are one of biogeographic concern. Put another way, when evolution is considered to be guided by developmental constraints or by phylogenetic constraints, it is orthogenetic.

Some researchers consider Croizat as one of the most original thinkers of modern comparative biology, whose contributions provided the foundation of a new synthesis between earth and life sciences.

While some biologists have continued to apply panbiogeographic approaches, the theory has been highly criticised and has been dismissed by mainstream biologists. The theory was described as "almost moribund" in 2007, and as having "fallen by the wayside" in 2023. Robert H. Cowie, writing in a book review in Heredity stated "Panbiogeography seems to me at best to offer little new insight, at worst to be fundamentally flawed" criticising panbiogeographers for not placing enough emphasis on phylogenetics, which Cowie states is "the underpinning of any biogeographical analysis".

== Selected works ==
- Manual of Phytogeography or An Account of Plant Dispersal Throughout the World. Junk, The Hague, 1952. 696 pp.
- Panbiogeography or An Introductory Synthesis of Zoogeography, Phytogeography, Geology; with notes on evolution, systematics, ecology, anthropology, etc.. Published by the author, Caracas, 1958. 2755 pp.
- Principia Botanica or Beginnings of Botany. Published by the author, Caracas, 1961. 1821 pp.
- Space, Time, Form: The Biological Synthesis. Published by the author, Caracas, 1964. 881 pp
- Croizat, L (1982). "Vicariance/vicariism, panbiogeography, "vicariance Biogeography," etc.: a clarification". Systematic Zoology. 31 (3): 291–304. doi:10.2307/2413236. JSTOR 2413236.
