= Paulo Vanzolini =

Brazilian composer and herpetologist (1924–2013)

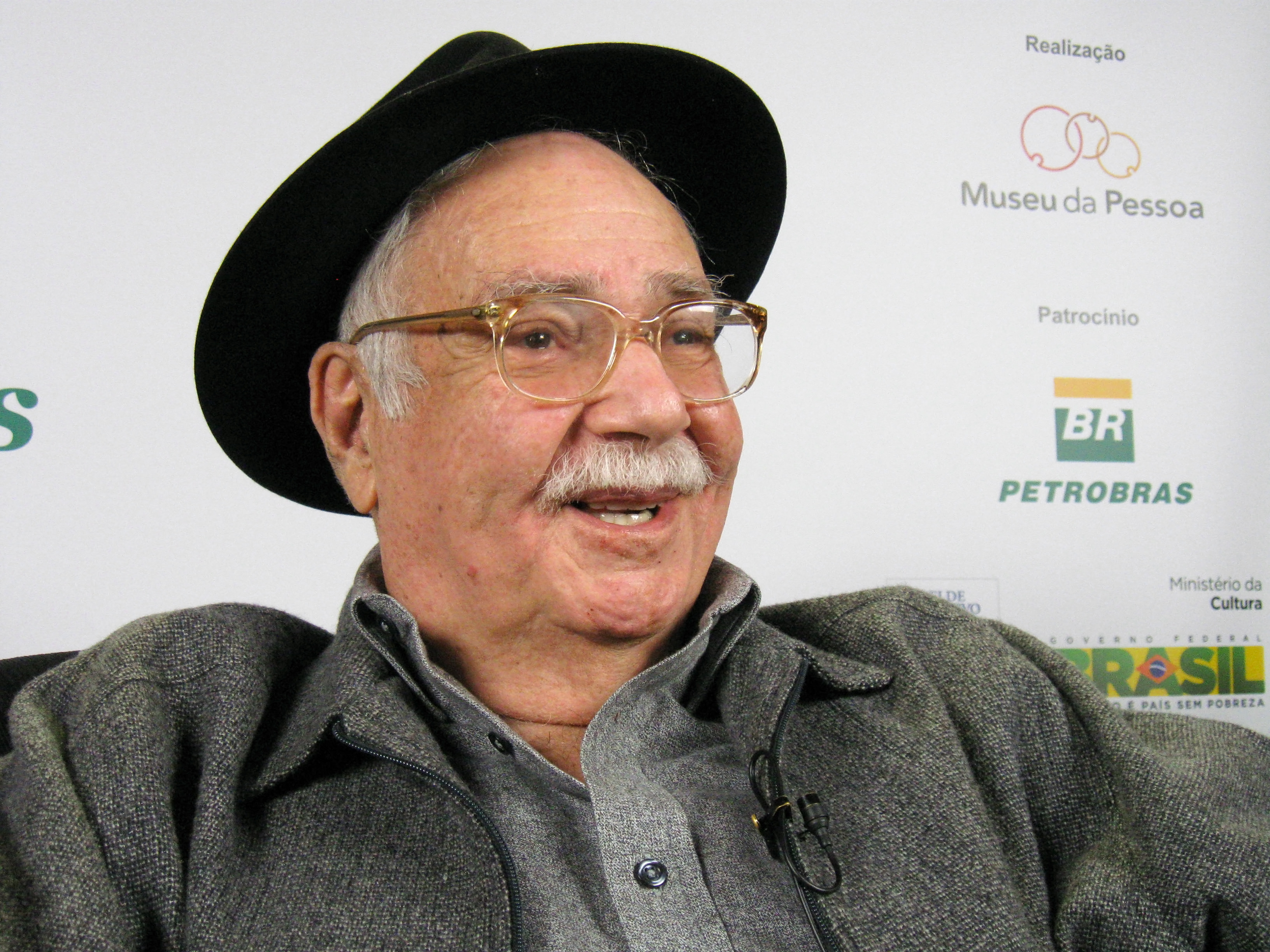
- Vanzolini in 2011.

Background information
- Born: Paulo Emilio Vanzolini; April 25, 1924
- Origin: São Paulo, Brazil
- Died: April 28, 2013 (aged 89)
- Genres: samba
- Occupations: Singer, songwriter, zoologist
- Instrument: Voice
- Years active: 1942–2013
- Website: http://www.paulovanzolini.com.br

Paulo Emilio Vanzolini (Portuguese pronunciation: [ˈpawlu eˈmiliu vɐ̃zoˈlini]; April 25, 1924 – April 28, 2013) was a Brazilian scientist and music composer. He was best known for his samba compositions, including the famous "Ronda", "Volta por Cima", and "Boca da Noite", and for his scientific works in herpetology. With Carl Gans he was one of the two leading authorities in worm lizards (Amphisbaenia).He is considered one of the greatest samba composers from São Paulo. Until his death, he still conducted research at the University of São Paulo (USP).

== Personal life and academic career ==
Paulo Vanzolini was born in São Paulo. When he was four years old, his family moved to Rio de Janeiro where he lived for two years. In 1930, he came back to São Paulo where he studied all his life. In 1942, Vanzolini started studying medicine. At this period, he used to go out with friends whole nights and during these nights he composed his first songs.

In 1944, he worked at Rádio América, with his cousin. However, when Vanzolini was drafted into the army, he had to stop his work and studies. Two years later, he restarted the medicine course and became a school teacher and a researcher for the Museu de Zoologia, of the University of São Paulo. In 1947, he graduated in medicine. One year later, he married, and went to the USA where he received his PhD in zoology at Harvard University.

Between 1963 and 1993, Vanzolini served as director of the Museu de Zoologia, becoming a famous zoologist. He was responsible for assembling one of the largest collections of reptiles and a large library about these kinds of animals. Although retired since 1993, the zoologist and musician still had a research affiliation with the Museu de Zoologia of the University of São Paulo until his death.

== Music career ==
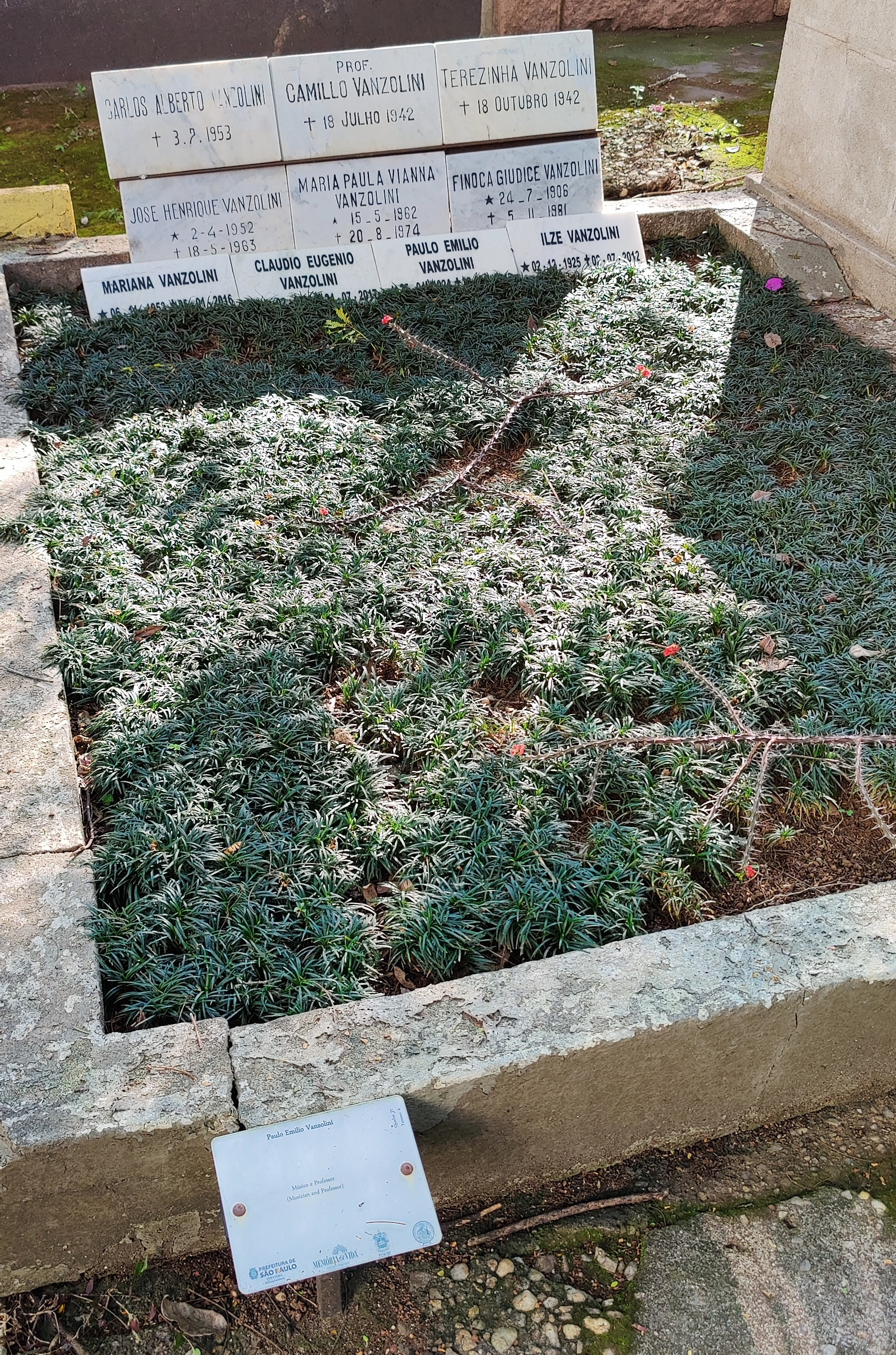
Vanzolini family tomb at Cemitério da Consolação in São Paulo (2022)

Paulo Vanzolini composed his first sambas during the years he studied medicine. However, his greatest hits were composed in the 1950s. In 1951, after obtaining his PhD and returning to Brazil, he composed "Ronda", and in 1959 he composed "Volta por cima". These songs were recorded by many Brazilian artists.

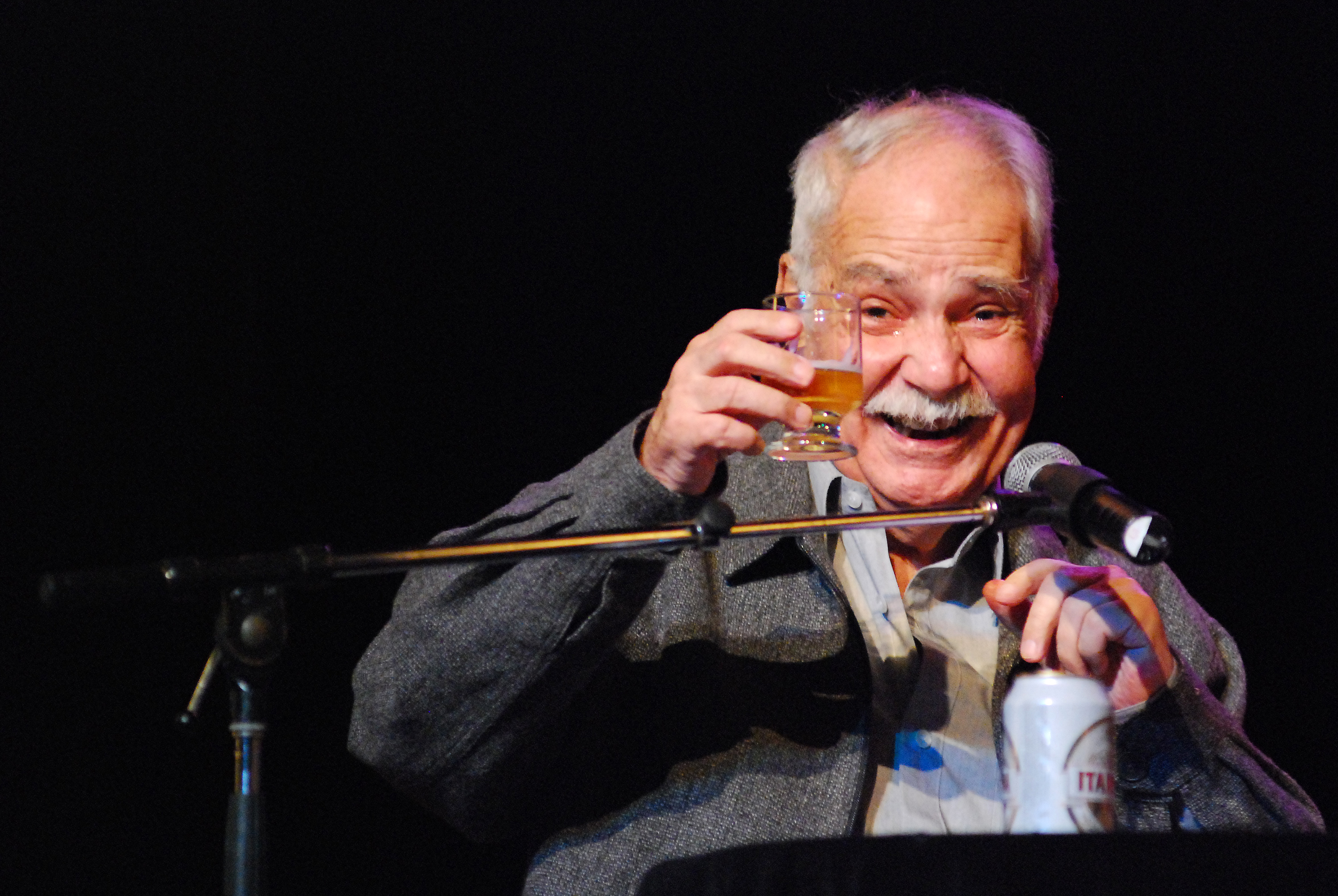
Paulo Vanzolini in 2008.

For years, despite the success of his songs, Vanzolini never recorded an album. However, in 1967, his friends Luís Carlos Paraná and Marcus Pereira produced an album containing Vanzolini's songs. It was named Onze sambas e uma capoeira and it features the participation of famous artists such as Toquinho and Chico Buarque.

In 1969, he composed with Toquinho. The results of this partnership were released in that same year in the album Boca da Noite, by Toquinho, who was Vanzolini's only partner during his career as a musician and composer.

In 1981, Vanzolini recorded Por ele mesmo. This is the one and only LP performed by himself. Excluding this album, the only way to listen to him singing was at Boate Jogral, where he used to play.

In 2003, Vanzolini was honored with the release of the album Acerto de contas. It is a collection of his songs played by the most famous artists of Brazil.

== Distinctions ==
Vanzolini received many honors and distinctions among them

- APCA Premium (São Paulo Association of Art Critics Premium), in recognition of his musical work
- Member of the Brazilian Academy of Sciences
- Guggenheim Foundation Fellow (1949), New York City, for his contribution to science
- Honorary Foreign Member of the American Association of Ichthyologists and Herpetologists (1973)
- Great Cross of the National Scientific Merit Order, Brazil (1994)
- Merit Honor Diploma from the Brazilian Society of Zoology (2000)
- Rio Branco Order (2002)
- Commendan of the Ipiranga Order (2003)
- Rocha Lima Medal of the Biological Institute of São Paulo (2004)
- Emeritus Researcher of the National Council of Scientific Development (CNPq, 2007)
- Anchieta Medal (2009)
- Conrado Wessel Prize in the category "Culture" (2011)

== Taxa named in his honor ==
Several described species were named after Professor Vanzolini, such as:

- Alpaida vanzolinii Levi, 1988 (Arachnida, Araneidae)
- Alsodes vanzolinii (Donoso-Barros, 1974) (Amphibia, Cycloramphidae)
- Amphisbaena vanzolinii Gans, 1963 (Reptilia, Amphisbaenidae)
- Anolis vanzolinii (E.E. Williams, Orcés, Matheus, Bleiweiss, 1996) (Reptilia, Dactyloidae)
- Anotosaura vanzolinia Dixon, 1974 (Reptilia, Gymnophthalmidae)
- Cnemidophorus vanzoi Baskin & E.E. Williams, 1966 (Reptilia, Teiidae)
- Cochranella vanzolinii Taylor & Cochran, 1953 (Amphibia, Centrolenidae)
- Dendrobates vanzolinii Myers, 1982 (Amphibia, Dendrobatidae)
- Exallostreptus vanzolinii Hoffman, 1988 (Diplopoda, Spirostreptidae)
- Gymnodactylus vanzolinii Cassimiro & Rodrigues, 2009 (Reptilia, Phyllodactylidae)
- Gymnophthalmus vanzoi Carvalho, 1999 (Reptilia, Gymnophthalmidae)
- Hylodes vanzolinii Heyer, 1982 (Amphibia, Leptodactylidae)
- Kentropyx vanzoi Gallagher & Dixon, 1980 (Reptilia, Teiidae)
- Leporinus vanzoi Britski & Garavello, 2005 (Actinopterygii, Anostomidae)
- Lygophis vanzolinii Dixon, 1985 (Reptilia, Colubridae)
- Nausigaster vanzolinii Andretta & Carrera, 1952 (Insecta, Syrphidae)
- Phrynomedusa vanzolinii Cruz, 1991 (Amphibia, Hylidae)
- Pithecia vanzolinii Hershkovitz, 1987 (Mammalia, Primates, Cebidae)
- Psittoecus vanzolinii Guimarães, 1974 (Insecta, Philopteridae)
- Saimiri vanzolinii Ayres, 1985 (Mammalia, Primates, Cebidae)
- Vanzosaura Rodrigues, 1991 (Reptilia, Gymnophthalmidae)

== Discography ==
- 1967: Onze sambas e uma capoeira (recorded by various artists)
- 1974: A música de Paulo Vanzolini
- 1981: Por ele mesmo
- 2003: Acerto de contas
