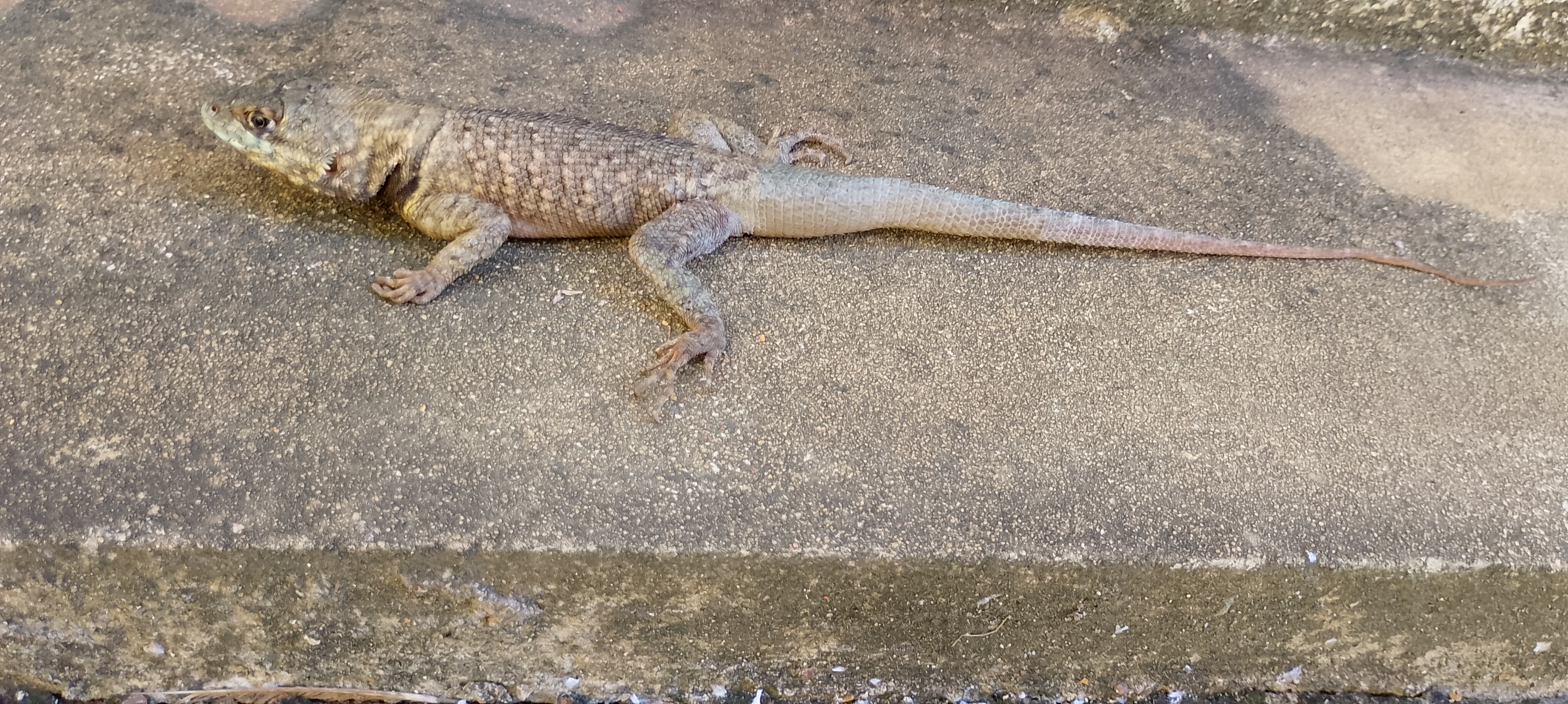
- Male caught in Brazil

Conservation status
- Least Concern (IUCN 3.1)

Scientific classification
- Kingdom: Animalia
- Phylum: Chordata
- Class: Reptilia
- Order: Squamata
- Suborder: Iguania
- Family: Tropiduridae
- Genus: Tropidurus
- Species: T. hispidus

Binomial name
- Tropidurus hispidus (Spix, 1825)

= Tropidurus hispidus =

Species of lizard

Tropidurus hispidus, Peters's lava lizard or neotropical lava lizard, is a species of lizard of the Tropiduridae family. It is found in South America.

== Etymology ==
The scientific name derives from the Greek "Tropidurus" (meaning "keel") and the Latin "hispidus" (meaning "rough" or "shaggy").

== Geographic range/habitat ==
Tropidurus hispidus is found in several countries of South America, including Venezuela, Isla Margarita, Guyana, Suriname, French Guiana and Brazil. In Brazil, Tropidurus hispidus has a generally uniform and apparently continuous distribution throughout the Caatinga biome. It also occurs in coastal sand dunes within Restinga habitats of the Atlantic Forest, at several localities in the transition zone between the Caatinga and Atlantic Forest, in the campos rupestres of the Serra do Espinhaço range within the Cerrado biome, and in enclaves of open vegetation in the Amazon biome, extending northward to areas north of the Amazon River. Tropidurus hispidus is considered a habitat generalist and can be found on a wide variety of substrates, including rocks, soil, forest edges, trees, fallen logs, sandy ground, fences and house walls. Its also considered a synanthropic species, often living in gardens and backyards. It adapts to places with extreme climatic conditions and those with an average temperature of 24 to 26 °C (75 to 79 °F).

== Description ==
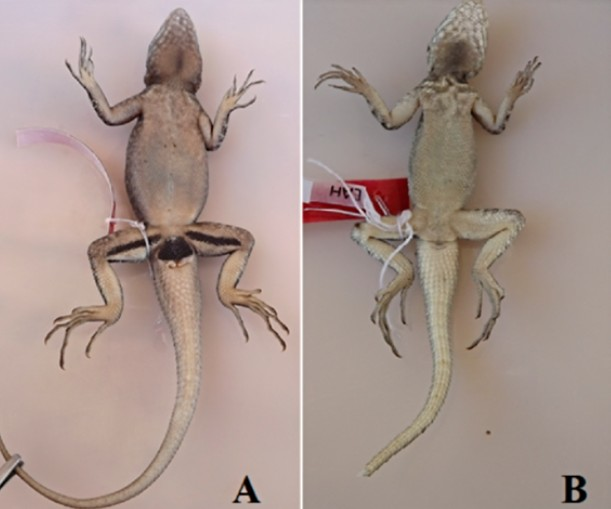
Male (A) and female (B)

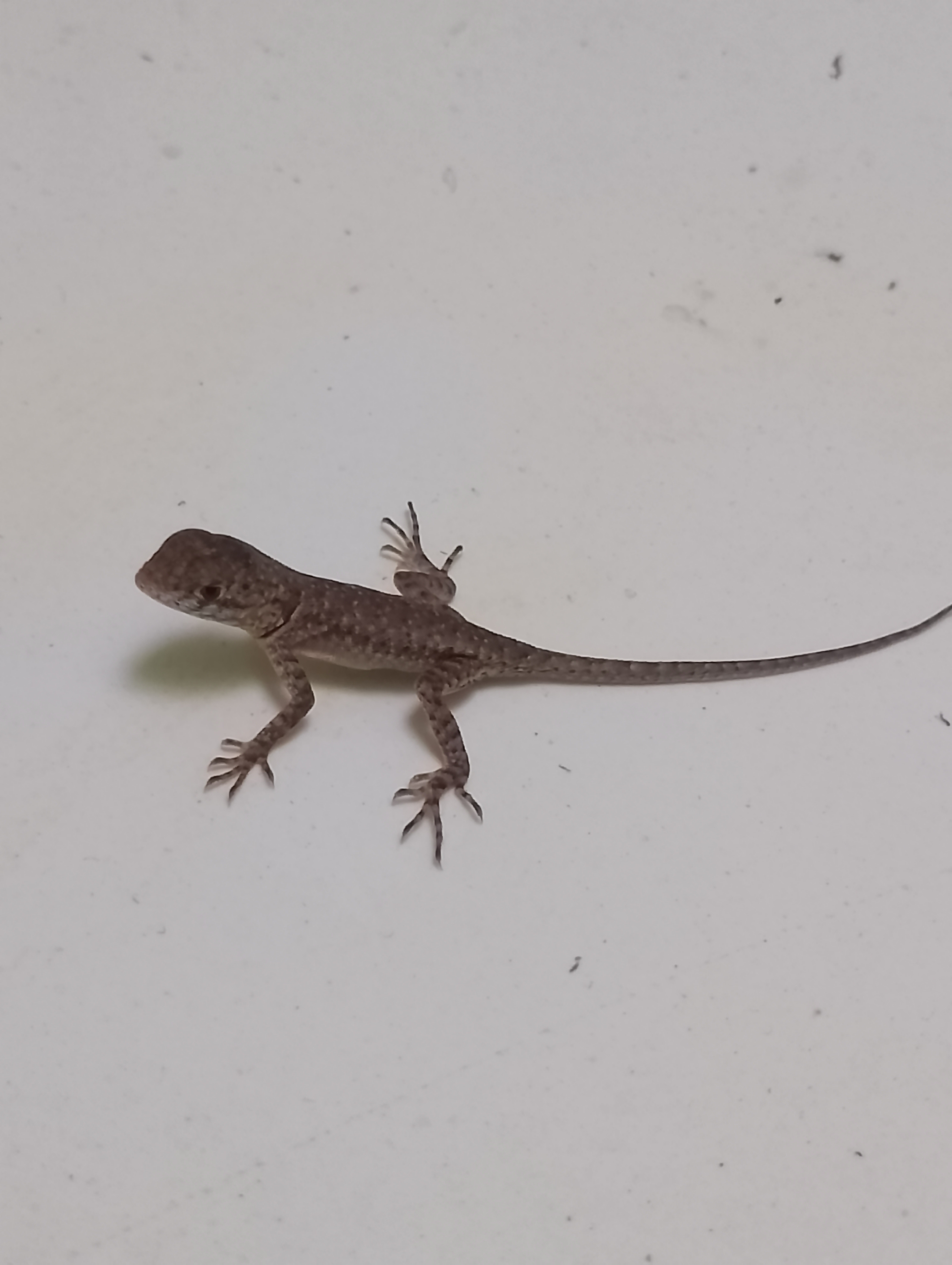
Juvenile

=== Size ===
This species is the largest of the Tropidurus genus, reaching 35 cm (14 in) in maximum total length. Dominant males range from about 10 cm to 11 cm in snout–vent length, although some individuals may reach up to 15 cm. Females are smaller, reaching a maximum snout-vent length of 11.3 cm. The minimum snout-vent length at maturity for this species is 6.5 cm for females and 6.8 cm for males. The hatchlings of Tropidurus hispidus are much smaller than adults, being around 2.7 to 2.9 cm in snout-vent length, and around 6.3 to 7.7 in total length, with an average mass of 1 gram.

=== Characteristics ===
The dorsal scales of Tropidurus hispidus are overlapping and differ from those of other species in the genus by being strongly keeled, pointed, and rough even in the neck region, which can differ it from other species such as Tropidurus torquatus and tropidurus oreadicus. It has 60 to 87 scales from the occipital region to the level of the upper edge of the thigh. It has one mite pocket in both sides of the neck. It has cryptic coloration that may vary from grey to light brown in the dorsal region, with dark or light brown spots that form irregular patterns that may appear clearly or even be absent in some specimens. The ventral part of the body has a light brown coloration.

=== Sexual dimorphism ===
The species exhibits sexual dimorphism, with males being larger, more territorial and being relatively more robust than females. Sexual dimorphism can also be identified by the lower neck coloration (which is yellowish in young males and becomes much darker in larger and older individuals), by a black stripe on the ventral aspect of each thigh and a black compact spot on the pre-cloacal flap.

== Diet ==
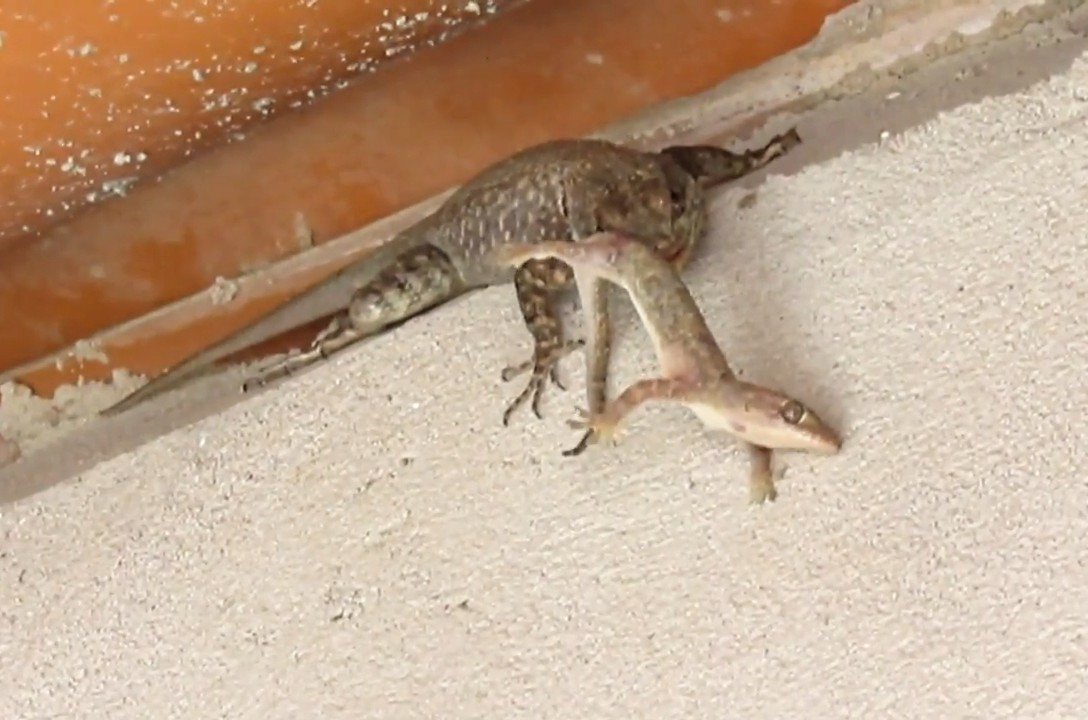
Successfully hunted Hemidactylus mabouia

=== Overall diet ===
The diet of Tropidurus hispidus indicates that it is a generalist and opportunistic forager, exploiting a wide variety of food resources available in its habitat. Its diet includes numerous arthropods, particularly insects such as Camponotus ants, as well as arachnids, plant material, and several small vertebrates. The species has also been reported to exhibit cannibalistic behavior, demonstrating its ability to exploit diverse prey items depending on availability.

=== Cannibalism ===
Cannibalism in Tropidurus hispidus generally appears to be directed toward juveniles, likely because their considerably smaller size makes them easier for adults to ingest. This may be facilitated by the coexistence of adults and juveniles during the recruitment period, particularly when territorial adult males encounter young lizards dispersing in search of suitable areas to establish their own territories. Juveniles may also be more susceptible to predation due to their limited experience in detecting predators and recognizing habitat structures, making them potential prey for various predators, including adult conspecifics. Cannibalism in natural populations may also become more frequent as population density increases.

=== Predation on vertebrates ===
Among the vertebrate prey recorded in the literature, lizards are the most frequently represented group, including Colobosaura modesta, Vanzosaura multiscutata, Tropidurus jaguaribanus, Hemidactylus mabouia, Ameiva ameiva (juveniles), Ameivula ocellifera, Gymnodactylus geckoides, Phyllopezus pollicaris, Phyllopezus lutzae and Norops auratus. Birds are represented by Todirostrum cinereum, Eupetomena macroura, and, while frogs include Elachistocleis ovalis and Scinax x-signatus. The rodent Mus musculus has also been recorded as a prey option, specially for adult males, but only in 2 observations.

== Ecology ==
=== Bite force ===
Its bite force can reach about 103 N (23 lb_{f}) in adult males around 11 cm snout-vent length, with the distribution extending to approximately 130 N in males above 11 cm SLV. Maximum bite force is strongly associated with body size, as larger males develop relatively more robust jaw musculature than smaller individuals. It has a much stronger bite force compared to its relative Tropidurus semitaeniatus, which is also much smaller in size, has a more flat skull and can be a potential prey item for large males. It is thought that its imense bite force for its size may be a result of intense territorial and/or mate disputes between males.

==== Bite force injury capacity ====
The predation of vertebrate prey by Tropidurus hispidus may result in severe physical injuries. In one documented case, an adult male measuring 11.2 cm in SLV repeatedly captured and bit an adult Tropidurus jaguaribanus measuring 7.6 cm SVL during a predatory event. The prey subsequently showed multiple injuries, including a complete mandibular fracture, fractures of the femur and fibula, dislocations of the forelimb joints, several skin perforations and lacerations, hemorrhagic areas, and a crushed skull. The predator repeatedly shook the prey while holding it in its jaws and recaptured it after temporary releases, biting different regions of the body during the attack. It was also suggested that its bite force could be an adaptation for a more regular vertebrate predation compared to other species in the genus, as larger males tend to eat larger prey items and also have much higher bite forces compared to smaller males.

==== Bite force variation ====
The relatively high variability of the lower jaw morphology of Tropidurus hispidus may be related to its broad use of microhabitats. Unlike other lizards with much lower bite forces such as Eurolophosaurus nanuzae and Tropidurus semitaeniatus, which are primarily associated with rocky and relatively undisturbed habitats, Tropidurus hispidus occurs in a wider range of microhabitats, including urban areas. Its suggested that this broader ecological range may contribute to greater dietary diversity and, consequently, greater variation in lower jaw morphology and, consequently, more variable bite forces. Its also proposed that variation in bite performance may be influenced by sexual selection associated with agonistic interactions in male territorial disputes and between females, rather than being determined solely by feeding mechanics, as several specimens are found with scratches and wounds consistent with attacks from another Tropidurus hispidus.

=== Reproduction ===
Tropidurus hispidus reproduces seasonally, with reproductive activity coinciding with the rainy season, when food availability is higher. Seasonal rainfall appears to influence several aspects of its reproductive cycle. Females generally lay a clutch of 4 to 7 eggs.

=== Basking behavior ===
Tropidurus hispidus maintains a relatively high body temperature through behavioral thermoregulation and environmental heat sources. When basking, Tropidurus hispidus prefers to use substrate temperature rather than full exposure to sun light, which is the complete opposite of Tropidurus semitaeniatus, which is commonly seen in the same habitats and locations.

== Daily activity ==
Tropidurus hispidus generally spends most of its time remaining motionless, interspersed with periods of active foraging on a variety of substrates, including wood, rocks, and even walls in urban environments. Activity levels are generally highest during the early morning, with a peak typically occurring between 7:00 and 8:00 A.M, although individuals usually remain relatively active throughout the rest of the day until the late afternoon, around 6:00 P.M. The species is also most commonly observed either in full sunlight or in complete shade, while the use of partially shaded ("mosaic") microhabitats appears to be relatively uncommon. Individuals of Tropidurus hispidus are observed primarily on sunny days. Rocks are considered favorable substrates for thermoregulation and foraging in natural environments, while walls in yards and gardens are more frequently used in urban environments, particularly for thermoregulation. In urban areas, Tropidurus hispidus, especially juveniles, tend to forage directly on the ground.

== Territorialism ==
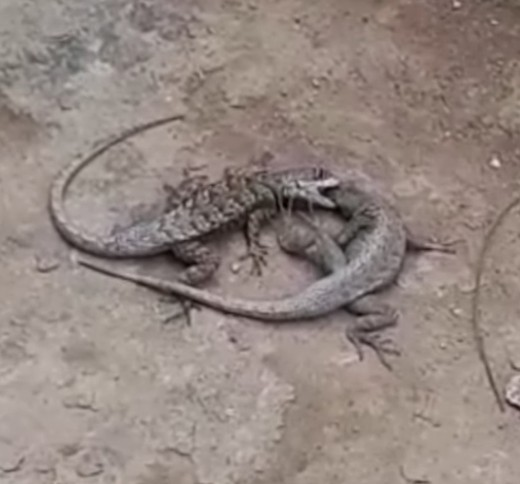
Territorial dispute between 2 adult males

Tropidurus hispidus presents evident territorial behavior, with aggressive and confrontational modes. These aggressive behaviors performed by males involve head bobbing, tail movements, chases and bites and are mainly observed when an invader male approaches a female or simply when a male enters the territory of others, indicating that territoriality is a striking characteristic of this species. In a physical confrontation, males can perform 360° circular movements on its own axis, also known as the "death roll", while biting and holding another male. Dominant males typically occupy larger territories and have access to a greater number of females than satellite males. These two male types employ different reproductive tactics: dominant males defend territories and associated females from rivals, whereas satellite males attempt to gain mating opportunities by entering the territories of dominant males.

== Invasive population ==
Until 2019, Tropidurus hispidus had not been recorded in the Fernando de Noronha Archipelago. The invasive species was first observed at the Forte de Nossa Senhora dos Remédios. It is suspected to have been introduced via cargo ships transporting construction materials. Since then, the fauna team of the Chico Mendes Institute for Biodiversity Conservation (ICMBio) in Fernando de Noronha has been monitoring the population and carrying out management measures. Between 2019 and 2025, there were 20 records, including a 2024 observation of a group of individuals of different ages, indicating a breeding population. The Tropidurus hispidus individuals are widely distributed, especially along the northern coast. The presence of Tropidurus hispidus is considered a direct threat to the local biodiversity, particularly because it may compete with or prey upon the endemic lizard Trachylepis atlantica.

== Parasites ==
The most common species of internal parasites affecting Tropidurus hispidus are the nematodes Physaloptera retusa, Strongyluris oscari, Physaloptera lutzi and Physalopteroides venancioi, as well those of the Rhabdias and Parapharyngodon genus. External parasites are mostly mites of the Eutrombicula genus.

== Gallery ==
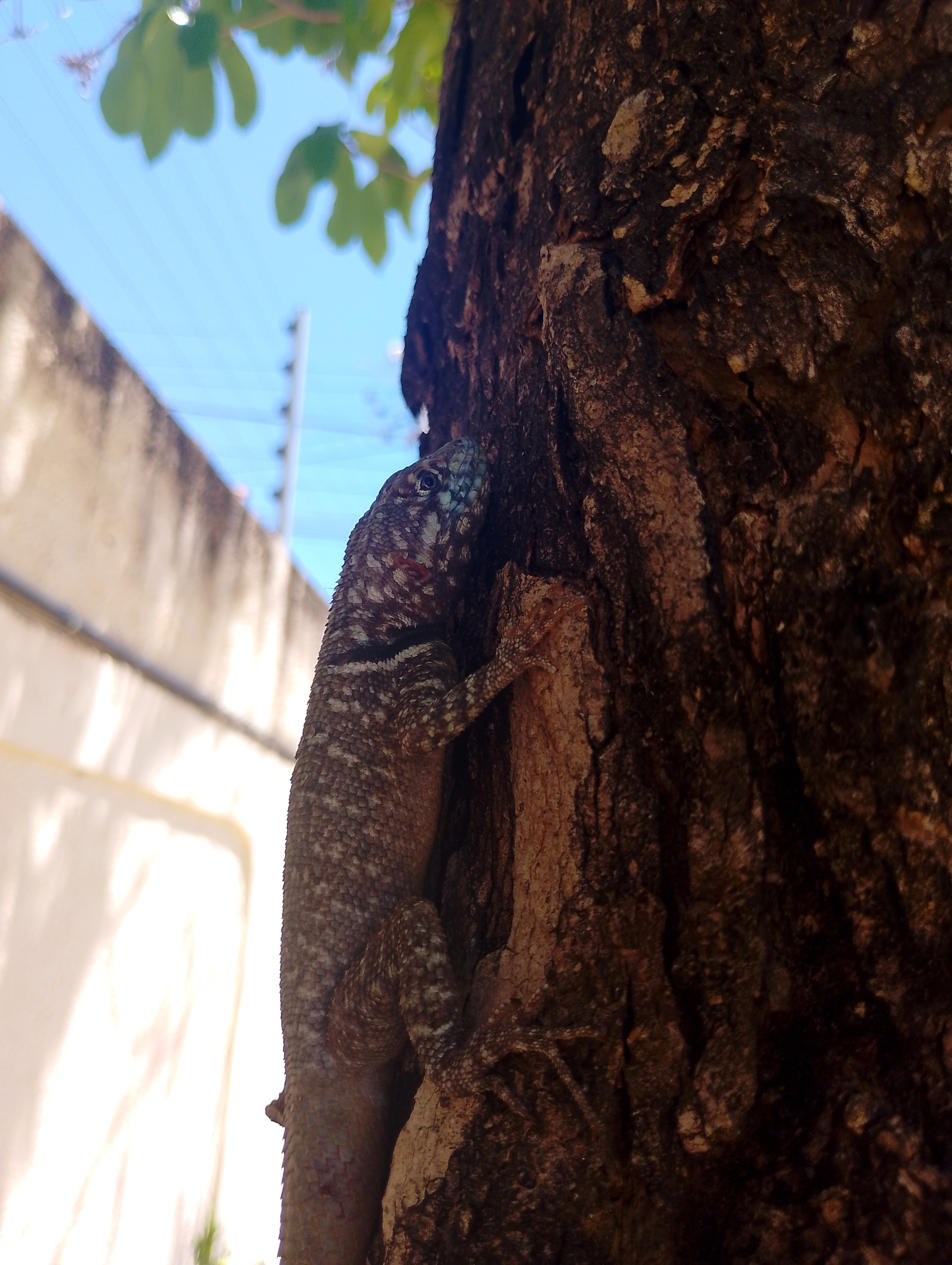
Large male standing still in a tree

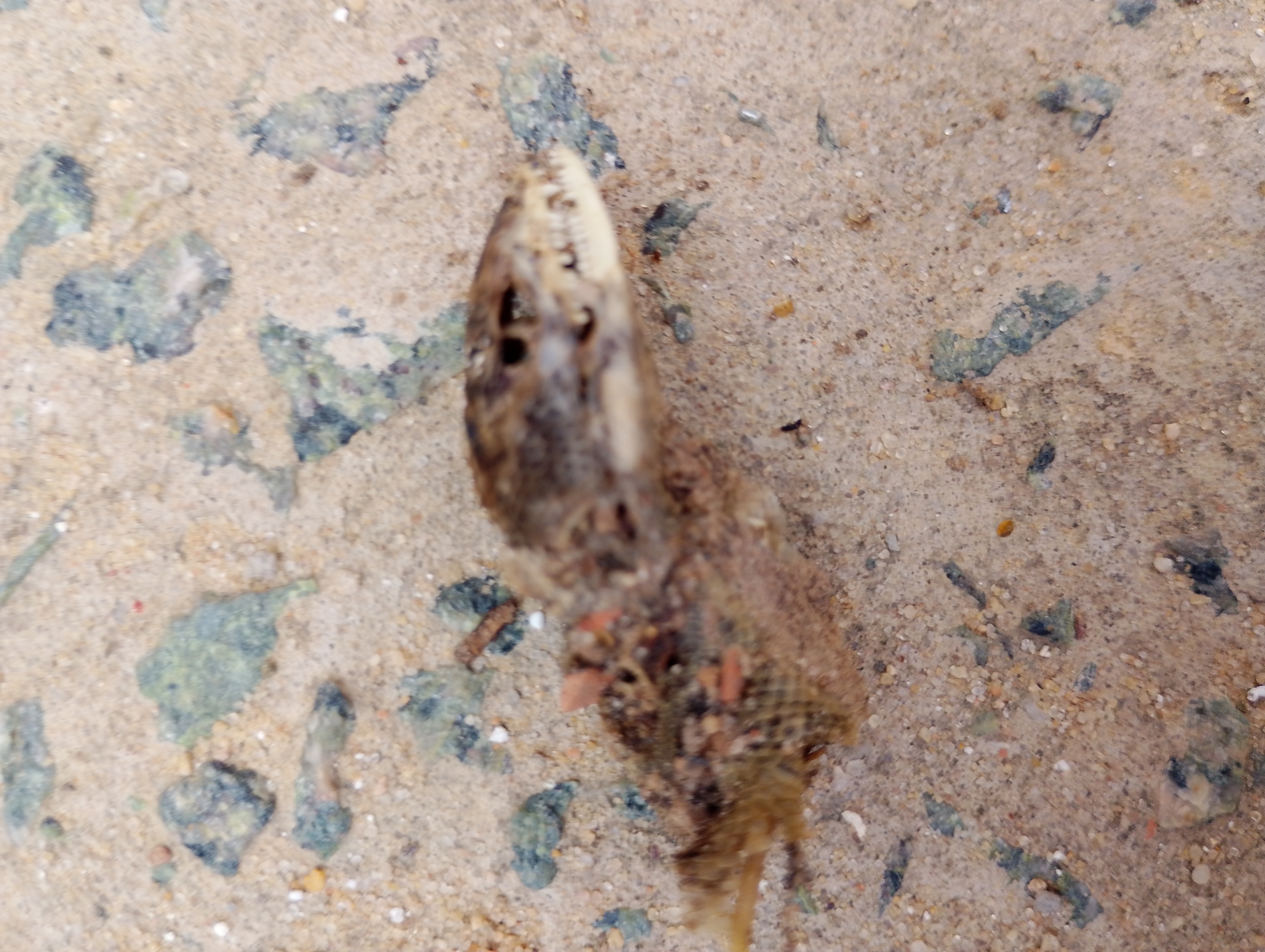
Carcass showing skull

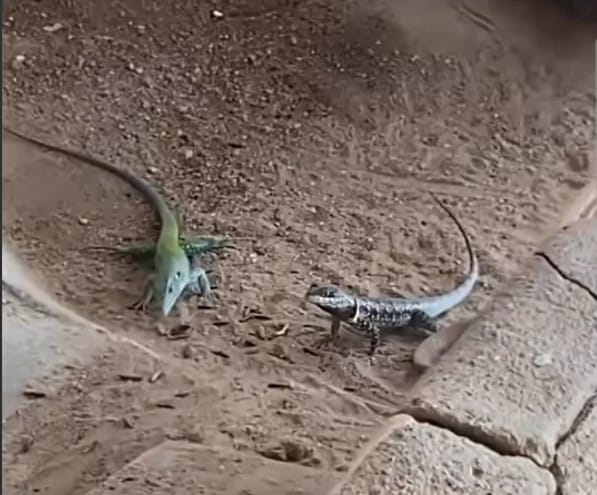
Tropidurus hispidus and Ameiva ameiva
