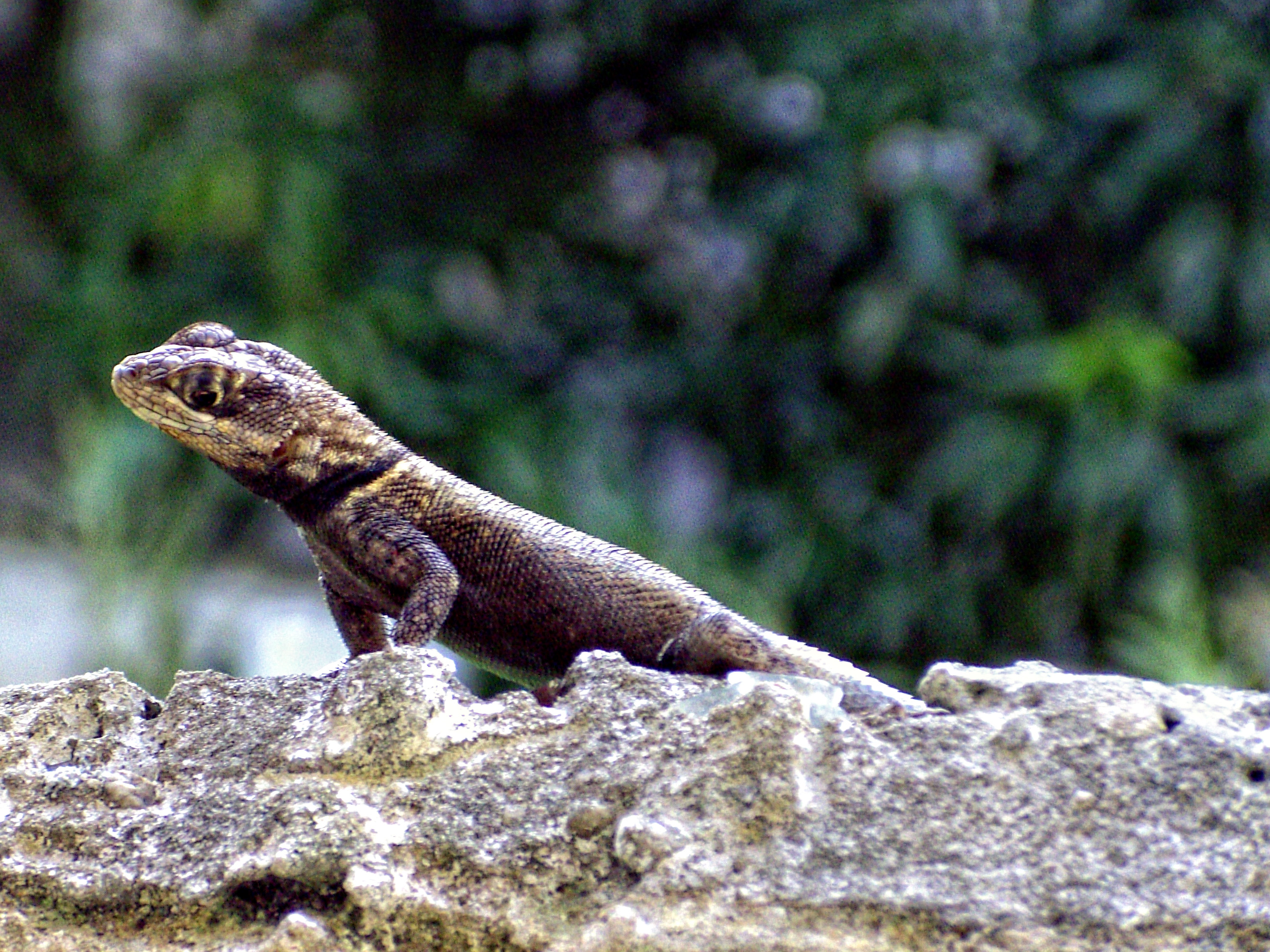
- Tropidurus oreadicus on a wall in Belém, Brazil

Scientific classification
- Kingdom: Animalia
- Phylum: Chordata
- Class: Reptilia
- Order: Squamata
- Suborder: Iguania
- Family: Tropiduridae
- Genus: Tropidurus; Wied-Neuwied, 1824

Type species
- Lacerta torquata Wied-Neuwied, 1820

Species
- 29, see text

Synonyms
- Platynotus; Strobilurus; Tapinurus; and see text

= Tropidurus =

Genus of reptiles

Tropidurus is a genus of reptiles. The genus includes many species of Neotropical ground lizards (family Tropiduridae). Tropidurus is the type genus of the family Tropiduridae.

== Geographic range and habitat ==
The genus occurs throughout open tropical and subtropical environments, primarily in the arid regions of South America, the isolated savannas within the Amazon, and along much of the Brazilian Atlantic coast. Most species of Tropidurus are closely associated with rocky habitats or areas dominated by sandy substrates.

== Common name ==
No common name is widely used solely for species of the genus Tropidurus. In their native range, they are simply called lagartixa, as are most similar animals. If anything, the Brazilian term calango is used to particularly refer to lizards of the genus Tropidurus.

== Taxonomy ==
The genus Tropidurus contains 30 described species, but new ones continue to be discovered. An additional seven species—the Galápagos lava lizards endemic to the Galápagos Islands—are sometimes placed here, too, but more commonly separated in the genus Microlophus, instead. Similarly, the green thornytail iguana and tropical thorny iguana are now often separated into the minor, but probably distinct Uracentron lineage, instead. In this article, these two genera are kept separate, while Platynotus, Strobilurus, and Tapinurus are included in Tropidurus.

== Description ==
Males and females of all Tropidurus species are marked differently. The male is usually much larger than the female, and his body is more brightly coloured and distinctly patterned. The typical size of Tropidurus lizards varies greatly from habitat to habitat as does the pattern of body markings, even among individuals of the same species. Like many lizards, they show changes of colour with mood and temperature. Tropidurus hispidus is widely considered the largest species in the genus.

== Species ==
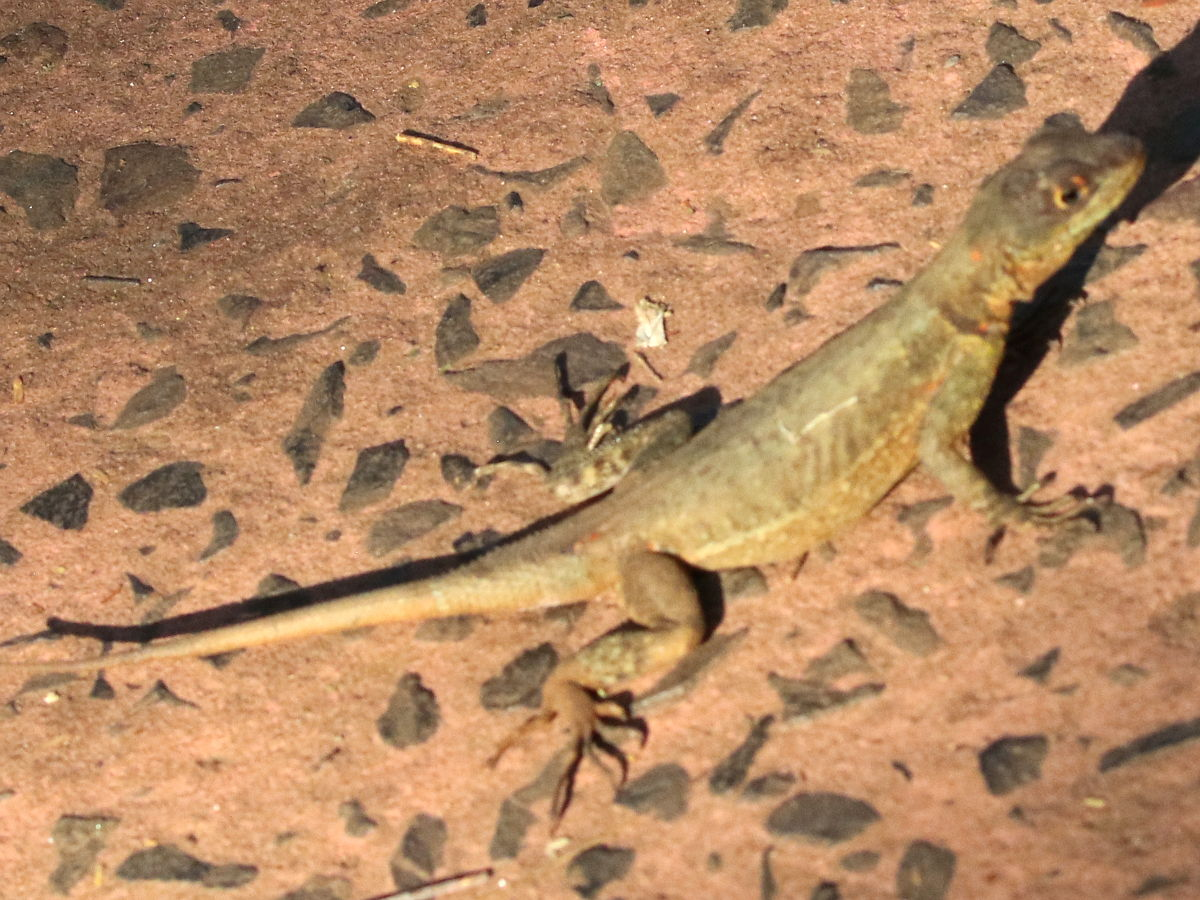
T. catalanensis basking at Iguazu Falls

These species are recognized as being valid:

- Tropidurus azurduyae A.L.G. Carvalho, L. Rivas, Céspedes & Rodrigues, 2018
- Tropidurus bogerti Roze, 1958 – keeled lava lizard
- Tropidurus callathelys M.B. Harvey & Gutberlet, 1998
- Tropidurus catalanensis Gudynas & Skuk, 1983
- Tropidurus chromatops M.B. Harvey & Gutberlet, 1998
- Tropidurus cocorobensis Rodrigues, 1987
- Tropidurus erythrocephalus Rodrigues, 1987
- Tropidurus etheridgei Cei, 1982 – Etheridge's lava lizard
- Tropidurus guarani Álvarez, Cei & Scolaro, 1994
- Tropidurus helenae (Manzani & Abe, 1990)
- Tropidurus hispidus (Spix, 1825) – Peters's lava lizard, neotropical lava lizard
- Tropidurus hygomi J.T. Reinhardt & Lütken, 1861 – Reinhardt's lava lizard
- Tropidurus imbituba Kunz & Borges-Martins, 2013
- Tropidurus insulanus Rodrigues, 1987
- Tropidurus itambere Rodrigues, 1987
- Tropidurus jaguaribanus Passos, Lima & Borges-Nojosa, 2011
- Tropidurus lagunablanca A.L.G. Carvalho, 2016
- Tropidurus melanopleurus Boulenger, 1902 – black lava lizard
- Tropidurus montanus Rodrigues, 1987
- Tropidurus mucujensis Rodrigues, 1987
- Tropidurus oreadicus Rodrigues, 1987
- Tropidurus pinima (Rodrigues, 1984)
- Tropidurus psammonastes Rodrigues, Kasahara & Yonenaga-Yasuda, 1988
- Tropidurus semitaeniatus (Spix, 1825) – striped lava lizard
- Tropidurus sertanejo A.L.G. Carvalho, et al., 2016
- Tropidurus spinulosus (Cope, 1862) – spiny lava lizard
- Tropidurus torquatus (Wied-Neuwied, 1820) – Amazon lava lizard
- Tropidurus xanthochilus M.B. Harvey & Gutberlet, 1998

Nota bene: A binomial authority in parentheses indicates that the species was originally described in a genus other than Tropidurus.
