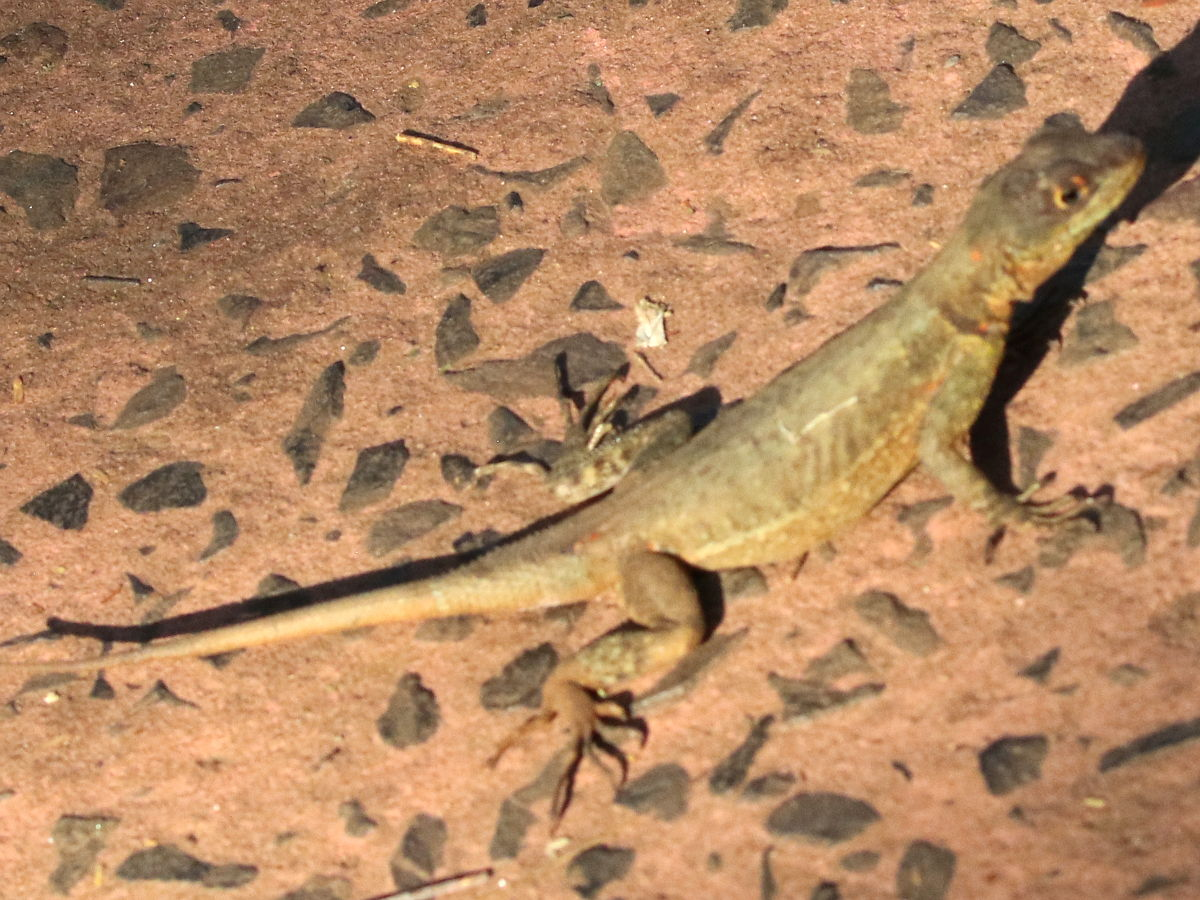

Conservation status
- Least Concern (IUCN 3.1)

Scientific classification
- Kingdom: Animalia
- Phylum: Chordata
- Class: Reptilia
- Order: Squamata
- Suborder: Iguania
- Family: Tropiduridae
- Genus: Tropidurus
- Species: T. catalanensis

Binomial name
- Tropidurus catalanensis Gudynas & Skuk, 1983

= Tropidurus catalanensis =

Species of lizard

Tropidurus catalanensis is a species of lizard in the family Tropiduridae, the neotropical ground lizards.

== Geographic range ==
It is native to South America, where it can be found in Argentina, Paraguay, Uruguay, and Brazil.
