= Acarodomatia =

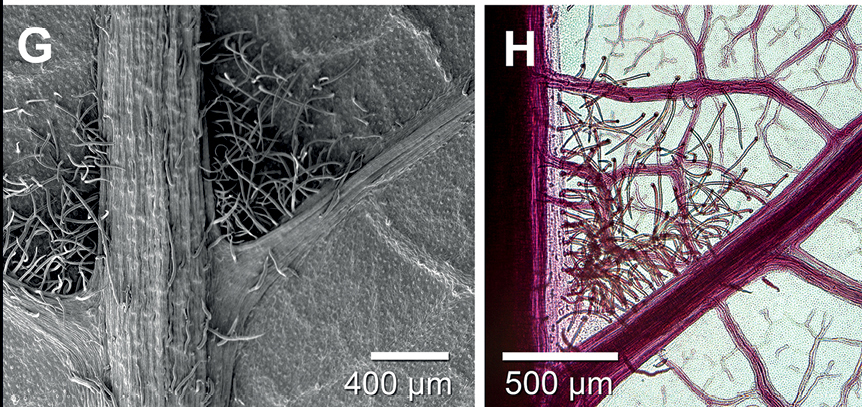
Acarodomatia in Bahiana occidentalis

Acarodomatia (singular Acarodomatium) (Latin: Acari - mites, domus - dwelling), are tussocks of hairs or nonglandular trichomes located in pits situated in major leaf vein axes of many plant species, occupied and caused by predatory and mycophagous mites.

Acarodomatia have also been described from lizards where they are commonly called "mite pockets". These cavities or skin folds are usually located around the neck or behind the legs and occupied by chiggers. Their function is debated, but they are thought to distract mites from damaging or blocking important skin surfaces such as the tympans.

== See also ==
- Domatium
