= Tropidurus spinulosus =

Conservation status
- Least Concern (IUCN 3.1)

Scientific classification
- Kingdom: Animalia
- Phylum: Chordata
- Class: Reptilia
- Order: Squamata
- Suborder: Iguania
- Family: Tropiduridae
- Genus: Tropidurus
- Species: T. spinulosus

Binomial name
- Tropidurus spinulosus (Cope, 1862)

Species of lizard

Tropidurus spinulosus, the spiny lava lizard, is a species of lizard of the Tropiduridae family. It is found in Brazil, Bolivia, Paraguay, and Argentina.
