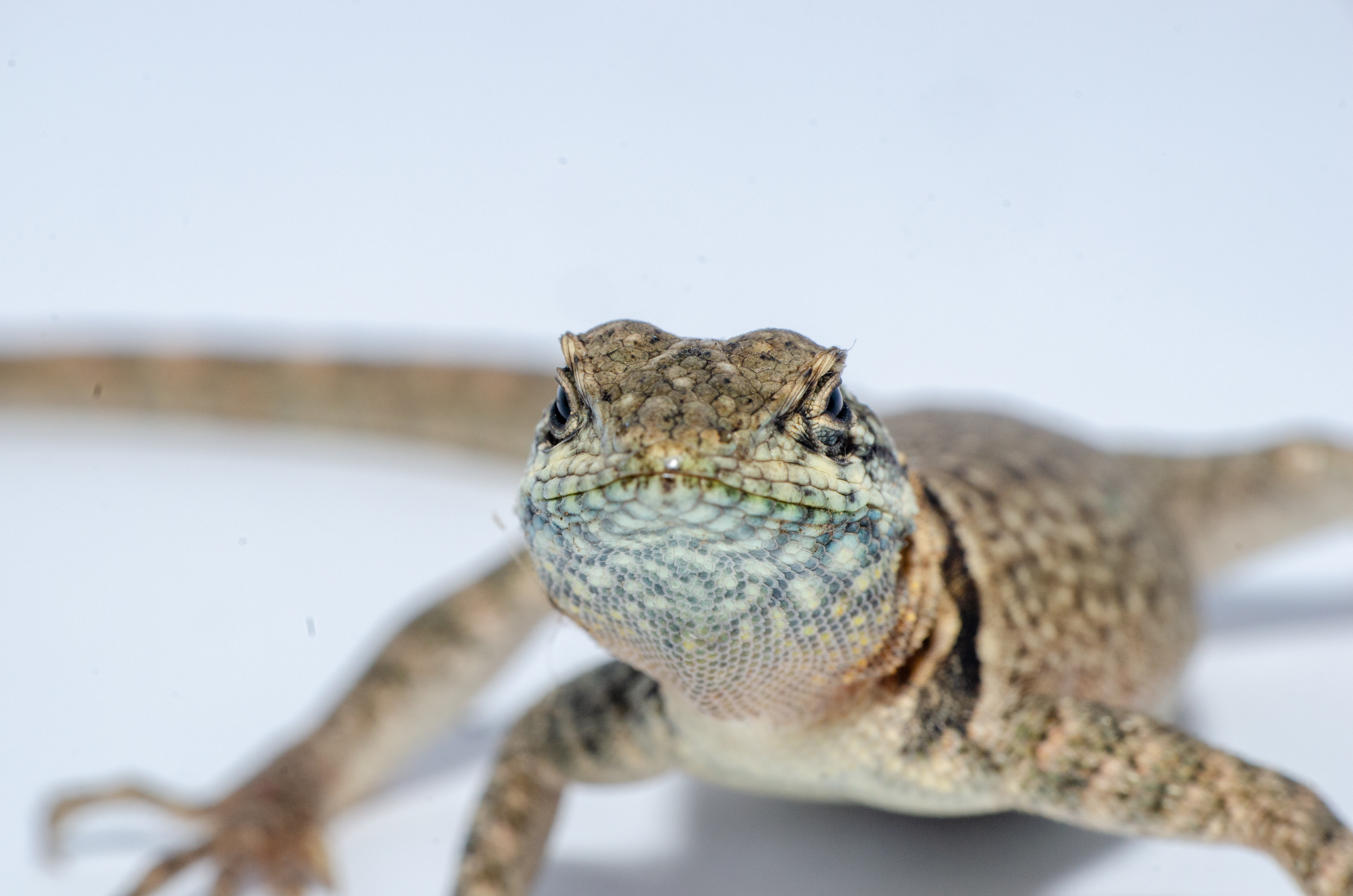

Scientific classification
- Kingdom: Animalia
- Phylum: Chordata
- Class: Reptilia
- Order: Squamata
- Suborder: Iguania
- Family: Tropiduridae
- Genus: Tropidurus
- Species: T. azurduyae

Binomial name
- Tropidurus azurduyae A.L.G. Carvalho, Rivas, Céspedes, & Rodrigues, 2018

= Tropidurus azurduyae =

Species of lizard

Tropidurus azurduyae is a species of lizard of the Tropiduridae family. It is found in Bolivia.
