= Tropidurus melanopleurus =

Conservation status
- Least Concern (IUCN 3.1)

Scientific classification
- Kingdom: Animalia
- Phylum: Chordata
- Class: Reptilia
- Order: Squamata
- Suborder: Iguania
- Family: Tropiduridae
- Genus: Tropidurus
- Species: T. melanopleurus

Binomial name
- Tropidurus melanopleurus Boulenger, 1902

Species of lizard

Tropidurus melanopleurus, the black lava lizard, is a species of lizard from the Andean region of western South America, ranging between the three different countries of Peru, Bolivia, and Argentina. It was described in 1902 by zoologist George Boulenger. It is fairly small in size, but is known for its different appearance and differing size between the males and females. However, while the patterns of color may be different between the sexes, both males and females have a very distinct physical color array with a patterned mix of green, orange, cream, black and or brown. This species of lizard lives in a generally warm to hot climate all year round and spends most of its day on the side of vertical rock structures in the mountains, feeding on various types of insects, with an emphasis on ants.

== Description ==
Female individuals of this species have a black to brown head with a prominent cream stripe across the temporal region of the head and back. The females have a black dorsum with a series of 4-6 red, cream, and green bands/large spots. The adult female SVL (Snout-Vent Length) is about 64.2 +/- 4.2 mm.

Male individuals of this species have a vertebral and dorsal crest that are the same color. The adult males have some small cream spots on the dorsal side, as well as a bright green dorsum with a bright orange color gradient leading to the head. The orange coloration of the neck and head is interwoven with a charcoal-colored reticulated pattern. The adult male SVL (Snout-Vent Length) is about 97.1 +/- 9.7 mm.

=== Sexual dimorphism ===
The Black Lava Lizard shows clear signs of sexual dimorphism. The males of this species have a longer, as well as wider, head than the females. The males are also larger than the females and show much different coloration patterns. The larger size and the larger size of the head can be explained by both the mating competition between the males and the differing prey size between males and females. More than just coloration and size, this species shows sexual dimorphism in the relative size between their bodies and hind legs. The males show negative allometric growth in their hind legs, meaning that the hind legs grow at a slower rate relative to the rest of the body. This results in the hind legs being relatively smaller to the rest of the body in adulthood than during adolescence. The females show isometric growth in hind legs, so the hind legs will be proportionally the same size to the rest of the body when they are adults as when they were younger.

== Distribution ==
The Black Lava Lizard can be found on the eastern slopes of the Andes from southeastern Peru to the northwestern region of Argentina, passing through parts of Bolivia, such as La Paz.

== Habitat and ecology ==
The species lives on vertical clifflike areas of tertiary sedimentary rocks with gravel patches and very scarce vegetation. The males are usually found at higher elevations than the females on these rocky habitats. The average climate for a region of Bolivia (Santa Cruz de La Sierra) that Tropidurus melanopleurus has had many sightings at is an average high in the summer of 78.8 degrees Fahrenheit (26 degrees Celsius) and an average low in the winter of 68.0 degrees Fahrenheit (20 degrees Celsius). When dealing with the ambient temperatures, the males of this species are thermoregulators, while the females are thermoconformers. This is shown as the females are usually active over a broader range of body temperatures.

=== Diet ===
Black lava lizards are mainly insectivorous and show sexual differences in food habits as well. The adult females essentially exclusively eat ants. While many males eat ants as well, the males eat a variety of other insect prey items. These prey items include different species of beetles and arthropods. Generally, the prey for both males and females are 2–6 mm in length, with males eating the prey on the larger end of this average range, which explains the wider head of the males since there is a head width to prey size correlation. These food habits suggest that Tropidurus melanopleurus have a selective foraging behavior. Since the males and the females live in the same habitat, the difference in their feeding habits suggests that they are feeding specialists, not generalists. The individuals show preference towards prey items, rather than just preying on whatever is directly available.
