= Tropidurus lagunablanca =

Scientific classification
- Kingdom: Animalia
- Phylum: Chordata
- Class: Reptilia
- Order: Squamata
- Suborder: Iguania
- Family: Tropiduridae
- Genus: Tropidurus
- Species: T. lagunablanca

Binomial name
- Tropidurus lagunablanca Carvalho, 2016

Species of lizard

Tropidurus lagunablanca is a species of lizard of the Tropiduridae family. It is found in Paraguay and Brazil.
