= Tropidurus bogerti =

Conservation status
- Least Concern (IUCN 3.1)

Scientific classification
- Kingdom: Animalia
- Phylum: Chordata
- Class: Reptilia
- Order: Squamata
- Suborder: Iguania
- Family: Tropiduridae
- Genus: Tropidurus
- Species: T. bogerti

Binomial name
- Tropidurus bogerti Roze, 1958

Species of lizard

Tropidurus bogerti, the keeled lava lizard, is a species of lizard of the Tropiduridae family. It is found in Venezuela.
