= Tropidurus sertanejo =

Scientific classification
- Kingdom: Animalia
- Phylum: Chordata
- Class: Reptilia
- Order: Squamata
- Suborder: Iguania
- Family: Tropiduridae
- Genus: Tropidurus
- Species: T. sertanejo

Binomial name
- Tropidurus sertanejo Carvalho. Sena, Peloso, Machado, Montesinos, Silva, Campbell, & Rodrigues, 2016

Species of lizard

Tropidurus sertanejos is a species of lizard of the Tropiduridae family. It is found in Brazil.
