= Tropidurus guarani =

Conservation status
- Least Concern (IUCN 3.1)

Scientific classification
- Kingdom: Animalia
- Phylum: Chordata
- Class: Reptilia
- Order: Squamata
- Suborder: Iguania
- Family: Tropiduridae
- Genus: Tropidurus
- Species: T. guarani

Binomial name
- Tropidurus guarani B. Álvarez, Cei & Scolaro, 1994

Synonyms
- Tropidurus spinulosus guarani B. Álvarez, Cei & Scolaro, 1994; Tropidurus guarani — M. Harvey & Gutberlet, 1998

Species of lizard

Tropidurus guarani is a species of lizard in the family Tropiduridae. The species is native to central South America.

== Etymology ==
The specific name, guarani, refers to the Guarani language and culture of Paraguay.

== Geographic range ==
T. guarani is found in Paraguay and Brazil.

== Habitat ==
The preferred natural habitat of T. guarani is rocky outcrops in dry forest.

== Reproduction ==
T. guarani is oviparous.
