= Uracentron azureum =

Conservation status
- Least Concern (IUCN 3.1)

Scientific classification
- Kingdom: Animalia
- Phylum: Chordata
- Class: Reptilia
- Order: Squamata
- Suborder: Iguania
- Family: Tropiduridae
- Genus: Uracentron
- Species: U. azureum

Binomial name
- Uracentron azureum (Linnaeus, 1758)

Synonyms
- Lacerta azurea Linnaeus, 1758; Stellio brevicaudatus Latreille, 1802; Stellio azureus – Latreille, 1802; Uromastyx azurea – Merrem, 1820; Uracentron azureum – Kaup, 1826; Doryphorus [sp. ?] – Cuvier, 1829; Urocentron azurea – Wagler, 1830; Uranocentron [sp. ?] – Gray, 1831; Doryphorus azureus – Duméril & Bibron, 1837; Uranocentrum [sp. ?] – O'Shaugnessy, 1881; Uracentron azureum – Boulenger, 1885; Hoplurus azureus – Schlegel, 1858; Tropidurus azureum – Frost 1992; Uracentron azureum guentheri Boulenger 1894; Uracentron guentheri Boulenger, 1894; Uracentron azureum werneri Mertens, 1925; Uracentron werneri Mertens, 1925

Species of lizard

The green thornytail iguana (Uracentron azureum) is an arboreal species of lizard from the Amazon rainforest and forests in the Guiana Shield. It is found in Colombia, Guyana, Suriname, French Guiana, northeastern Peru, southern Venezuela, and northern Brazil. As in U. flaviceps (the only other species in the genus), U. azureum primarily feeds on ants.

The green thornytail iguana can reach about 9 cm (3.5 in) in snout–vent length and has a relatively short, spiny tail. It has three distinct subspecies, which sometimes have been recognized as separate species: the nominate subspecies is bright green with distinct blackish bands and is found in the northeastern part of the green thornytail iguana's range, the southwestern T. a. guentheri is duller with greyish or brownish rear body and tail, and the northwestern T. a. werneri is almost all green without distinct markings in adults.
