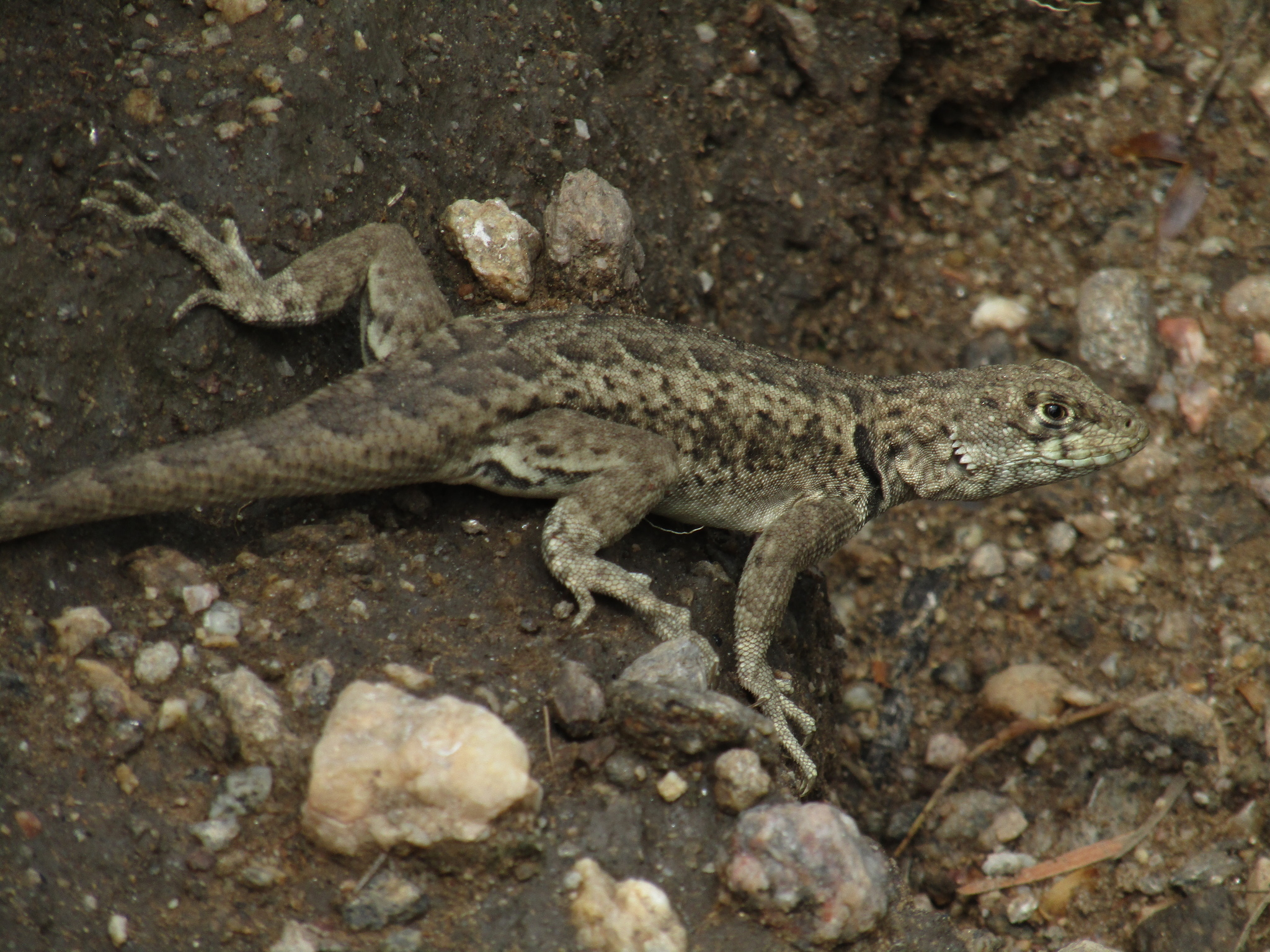

Conservation status
- Least Concern (IUCN 3.1)

Scientific classification
- Kingdom: Animalia
- Phylum: Chordata
- Class: Reptilia
- Order: Squamata
- Suborder: Iguania
- Family: Tropiduridae
- Genus: Tropidurus
- Species: T. etheridgei

Binomial name
- Tropidurus etheridgei Cei, 1982

= Tropidurus etheridgei =

Species of lizard

Tropidurus etheridgei, also known commonly as Etheridge's lava lizard, is a species of lizard of the family Tropiduridae. The species is endemic to South America.

== Etymology ==
The specific name, etheridgei, is in honor of American herpetologist Richard Emmett Etheridge.

== Geographic range ==
T. etheridgei is found in Argentina, Bolivia, Brazil, and Paraguay.

== Habitat ==
The preferred natural habitats of T. etheridgei are forest and savanna.

== Reproduction ==
T. etheridgei is oviparous.
