= Tropidurus insulanus =

Conservation status
- Least Concern (IUCN 3.1)

Scientific classification
- Kingdom: Animalia
- Phylum: Chordata
- Class: Reptilia
- Order: Squamata
- Suborder: Iguania
- Family: Tropiduridae
- Genus: Tropidurus
- Species: T. insulanus

Binomial name
- Tropidurus insulanus Rodrigues, 1987

Species of lizard

Tropidurus insulanus is a species of lizard of the Tropiduridae family. It is endemic to Brazil and is known from pockets of savanna within the Amazon rainforest of Pará and Mato Grosso states.

Males grow to 86 mm (3.4 in) and females to 75 mm (3.0 in) in snout–vent length (SVL). The tail is 1.4–1.5 times SVL. It is oviparous.
