= Tropidurus itambere =

Conservation status
- Least Concern (IUCN 3.1)

Scientific classification
- Kingdom: Animalia
- Phylum: Chordata
- Class: Reptilia
- Order: Squamata
- Suborder: Iguania
- Family: Tropiduridae
- Genus: Tropidurus
- Species: T. itambere

Binomial name
- Tropidurus itambere Rodrigues, 1987

Species of lizard

Tropidurus itambere is a species of lizard of the Tropiduridae family. It is found in Brazil.
