= Tropidurus hygomi =

Conservation status
- Least Concern (IUCN 3.1)

Scientific classification
- Kingdom: Animalia
- Phylum: Chordata
- Class: Reptilia
- Order: Squamata
- Suborder: Iguania
- Family: Tropiduridae
- Genus: Tropidurus
- Species: T. hygomi

Binomial name
- Tropidurus hygomi J.T. Reinhardt & Lütken, 1862

Species of lizard

Tropidurus hygomi, also known commonly as Reinhardt's lava lizard, is a species of lizard in the family Tropiduridae. The species is native to the Northeast Region of Brazil.

== Etymology ==
The specific name, hygomi, is in honor of Danish merchant seaman Vilhelm Johannes Willaius Hygom (born 1818), who collected natural history specimens, both land and marine.

== Geographic range ==
T. hygomi is found in the Brazilian states of Bahia and Sergipe.

== Habitat ==
The preferred natural habitat of T. hygomi is sandy areas, in forest and shrubland.

== Description ==
T. hygomi has an average snout-to-vent length (SVL) of 3.43 cm (1.35 in).

== Behavior ==
T. hygomi is terrestrial and diurnal.

== Diet ==
T. hygomi preys predominately upon ants, beetles, and termites, but also eats larvae and adults of other insects, spiders, wood lice, centipedes, and millipedes.

== Reproduction ==
T. hygomi is oviparous.
