= Tropidurus helenae =

Conservation status
- Least Concern (IUCN 3.1)

Scientific classification
- Kingdom: Animalia
- Phylum: Chordata
- Class: Reptilia
- Order: Squamata
- Suborder: Iguania
- Family: Tropiduridae
- Genus: Tropidurus
- Species: T. helenae

Binomial name
- Tropidurus helenae (Manzani & Abe, 1990)

Synonyms
- Tapinurus helenae Manzani & Abe, 1990; Tropidurus helenae — Frost, 1992

Species of lizard

Tropidurus helenae is a species of lizard in the family Tropiduridae. The species is native to northeastern Brazil.

== Etymology ==
The specific name, helenae, is in honor of Brazilian herpetologist Helena Ribas Lopes.

== Geographic range ==
T. helenae is endemic to the Brazilian state of Piauí.

== Habitat ==
The preferred natural habitat of T. helenae is savanna.

== Description ==
The holotype of T. helenae has a snout-to-vent length (SVL) of 7.0 cm (2.8 in), plus a tail length of 12.2 cm (4.8 in).

== Behavior ==
T. helenae is terrestrial, diurnal, and saxicolous (rock-dwelling).

== Diet ==
T. helenae preys upon termites.

== Reproduction ==
T. helenae is oviparous.
