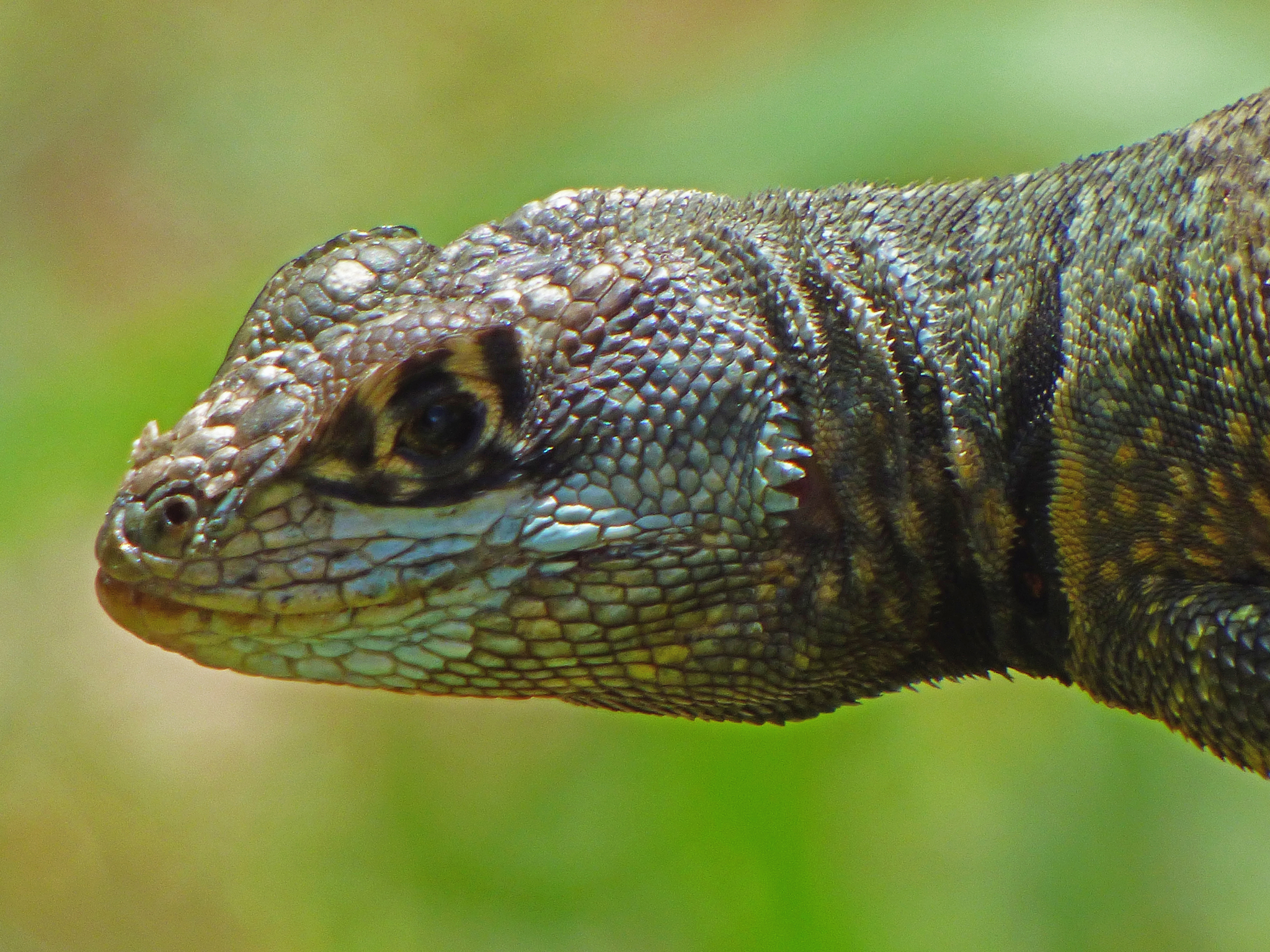

Conservation status
- Critically Endangered (IUCN 3.1)

Scientific classification
- Kingdom: Animalia
- Phylum: Chordata
- Class: Reptilia
- Order: Squamata
- Suborder: Iguania
- Family: Tropiduridae
- Genus: Tropidurus
- Species: T. imbituba

Binomial name
- Tropidurus imbituba Kunz & Borges-Martins, 2013

= Tropidurus imbituba =

Species of lizard

Tropidurus imbituba is a species of lizard of the Tropiduridae family. It is found in Imbituba, Santa Catarina - Brazil.
