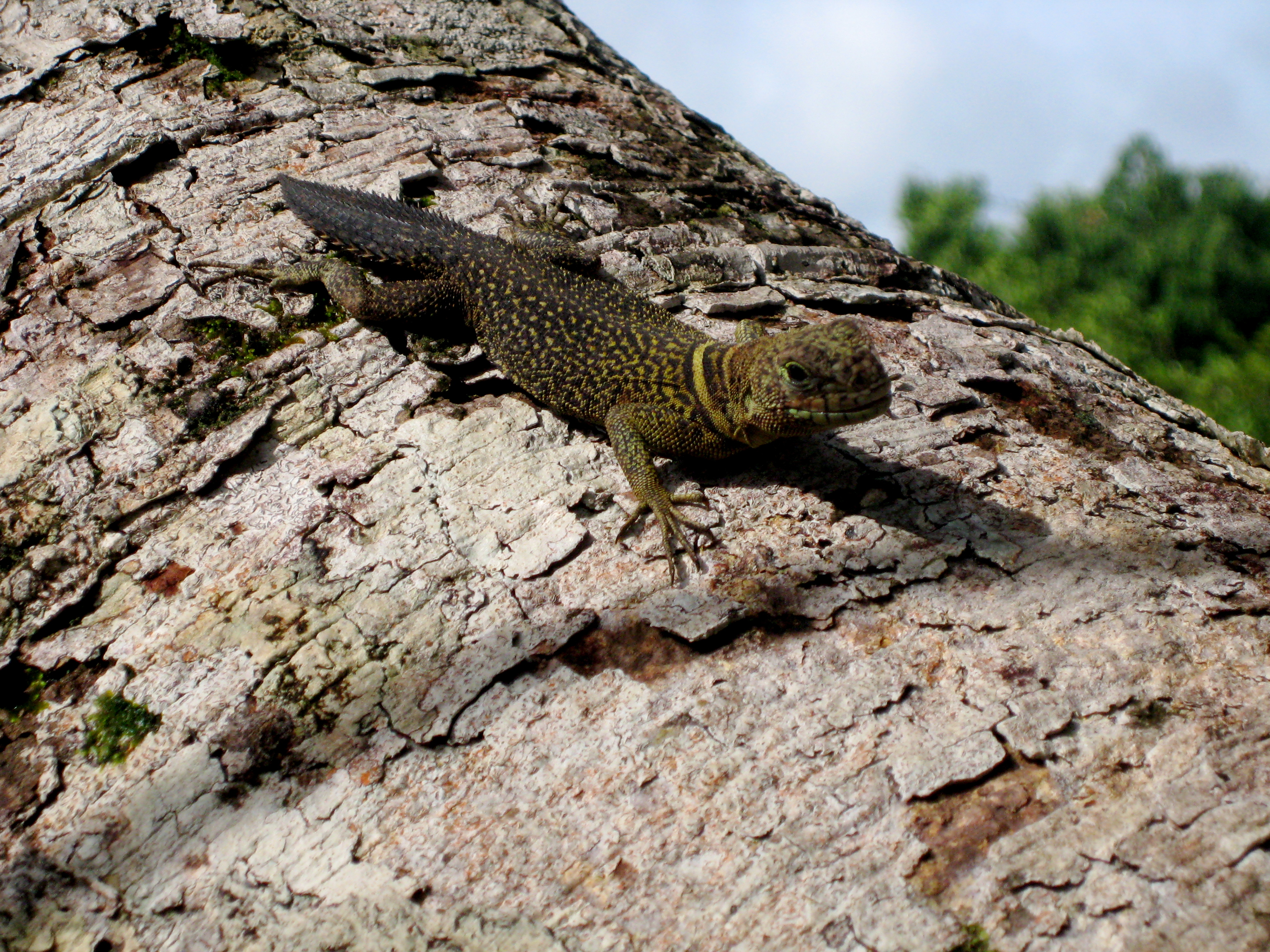

Conservation status
- Least Concern (IUCN 3.1)

Scientific classification
- Kingdom: Animalia
- Phylum: Chordata
- Class: Reptilia
- Order: Squamata
- Suborder: Iguania
- Family: Tropiduridae
- Genus: Uracentron
- Species: U. flaviceps

Binomial name
- Uracentron flaviceps (Guichenot, 1855)
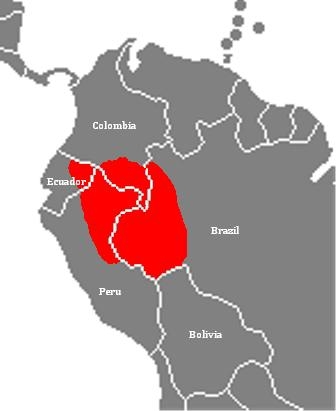
- Approximate distribution of the Tropical Thornytail Iguana (in Brazil, its distribution extends as far east as the lower Madeira River)

Synonyms
- Doryphorus flaviceps - Guichenot, 1855; Doryphorus castor Cope, 1871; Uranocentrum flaviceps - O'Shaughnessy, 1881; Urocentron castor - Boulenger, 1885; Tropidurus flaviceps - Frost, 1992

= Uracentron flaviceps =

Species of lizard

Uracentron flaviceps, the tropical thornytail iguana or Amazon thornytail iguana is an elusive species of medium-sized arboreal lizard found in the tropical lowlands of the Amazon rainforest. The species was described by French zoologist Alphonse Guichenot in 1855. They are considered to be ant specialists and exhibit communal nesting and a harem-style breeding system in which one male mates with and attends to multiple females. Study of this species has been impeded by difficulties collecting and observing them.

== Taxonomy ==
The species was originally named Doryphorus flaviceps by Guichenot in 1855. Since its original identification, the species has undergone a number of taxonomic changes. In 1881, it was renamed Uranocentrum flaviceps by O'Shaughnessy. This change did not last very long and the name was changed to Urocentron castor in 1885. Only minor taxonomic changes were made after 1885, until a change to U. flaviceps in 1925. This name lasted until 1992, when Darrel R. Frost renamed the species Tropidurus flaviceps. The name switched between T. flaviceps and U. flaviceps until 2003, when the genus Tropidurus was split into several genera and the tropical thornytail iguana was assigned to Uracentron.

== Distribution ==
The species has been noted in the lowlands of eastern Ecuador, eastern Peru, northwestern Brazil, and the extreme southern regions of Colombia; they may be found in Bolivia, as well.

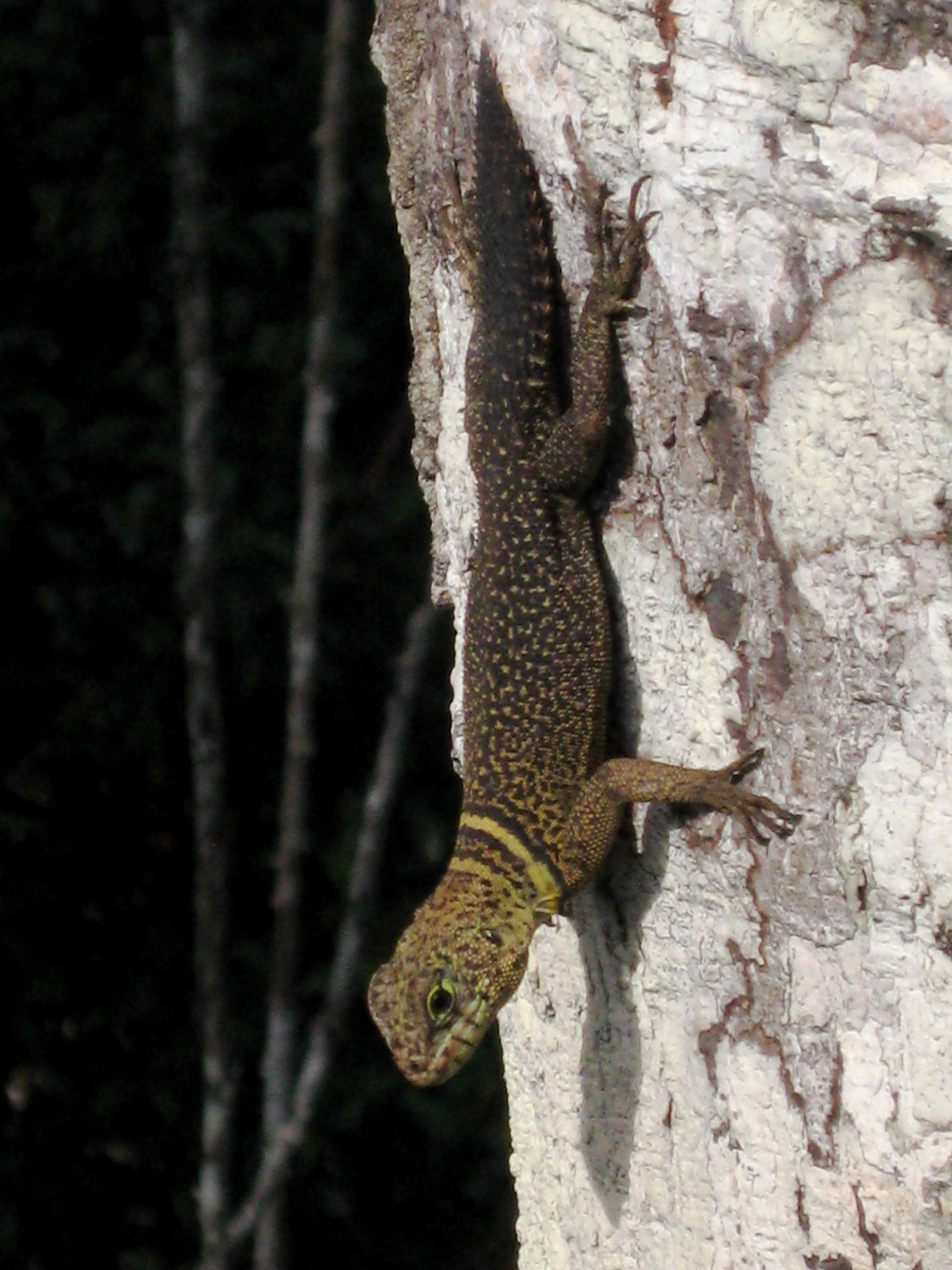
Female or juvenile

== Habitat ==
Tropical thornytail iguanas are only found in the Amazon Rainforest, and within it are generally found in lowland tropical rainforest; usually areas with lagoons, rivers, streams, and palm swamps. They are an arboreal species, spending the majority of their lives in high treetops. They prefer trees with high horizontal branches that allow for basking in the sun during the morning hours, and are almost only found in trees that contain hollow areas accessible through entrances in the tree branches and trunks. No specific species of tree has been found to be favored by the lizards; apparently the tree structure, rather than the species, determines what the lizards prefer.

== Physical description ==
Males can reach up to 13 cm (5.1 in) in snout–vent length, while the smaller females only reach 9.5 cm (3.7 in). They have a large, flat tail covered in scales that ends in a point; the function of these scales is currently unclear. The body is brown in color, speckled with yellow or gold spots. Some specimens found in Ecuador and Peru were noted as having a black collar around their necks. This collar is bordered by narrow, light-colored edges.

=== Sexual dimorphism ===
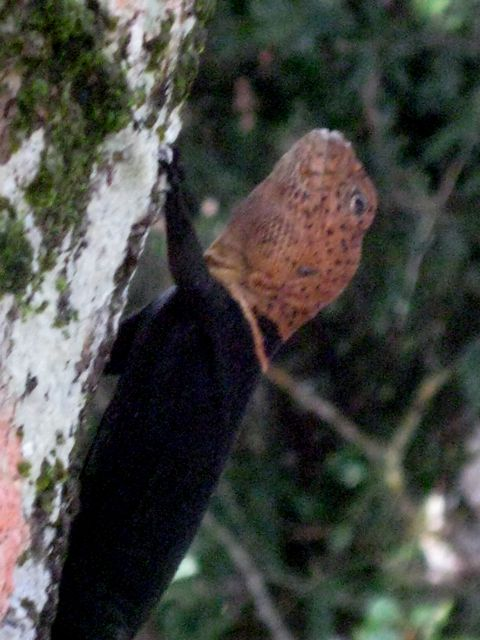
Example of a sexually mature male

Sexually mature males differ from females and juveniles in appearance, and this may be the result of sexual selection. The males have longer and deeper heads, and longer limbs when compared to females. Females are also generally a little bit shorter in length than males. Sexually mature males also display different coloration from females or juveniles. They have orange heads and black bodies, in contrast to the much more subdued coloring and yellow heads of females, juveniles, and immature males. Males that reach sexual maturity also have enlarged testes when compared to those of males that have not done so.

== Feeding and diet ==
Tropical thornytail iguanas are considered a sit-and-wait, or ambush predator. They are considered ant specialists, and various species of ants that wander the limbs and trunks of the trees inhabited by tropical thornytail iguanas make up a large percentage of their diet. Larger lizards eat slightly larger prey, such as stingless bees, true bugs, and beetles. Alates, which have been established as a prey item of the tropical thornytail iguana are not usually present on the limbs and trunks of trees. The lizards possibly break into the alate nests in the trees, or they may only eat the species when releases occur. Breaking into the nests a highly unusual behavior, as rarely does an ambush predator actively seek its prey. In studies investigating the eating behaviors of this species, no difference was found in the amount of prey consumed between male and female specimens. This indicates that resource partitioning is not the reason for the difference in head size between and male and female tropical thornytail iguanas.

== Behavior ==
The species is diurnal, active during the daytime. The level of activity exhibited is at least partially dependent on the presence of sunlight. Individuals emerge once the sun comes out, and remain active unless cloud cover reduces sunlight. The rough times of activity are from 8:30 am until 5:00 pm, and males appear to emerge from holes in trees earlier than females and juveniles. Upon emerging from the trees, lizards bask in the sun to raise their body temperature until sufficient heat is absorbed. When approached by humans or startled, the lizards either run into their holes to hide or run out on limbs of the tree to avoid danger.

== Social structure ==
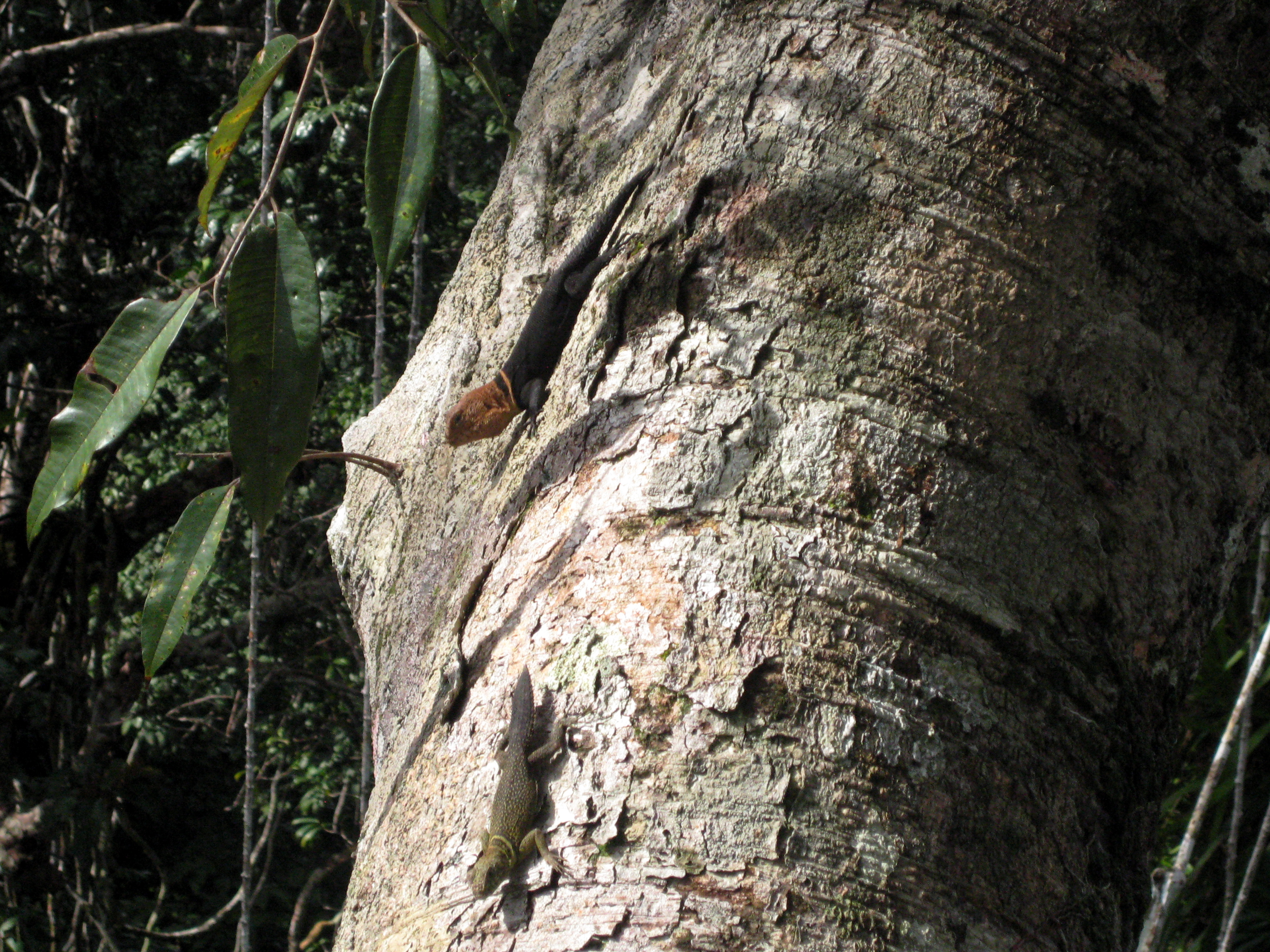
Sexually mature male and a female or juvenile

The tropical thornytail iguana has a resource-defense polygyny social structure with one sexually mature male to a group of females and juveniles of varied stages. Resource-defense polygyny means the females do not necessarily live in extremely close quarters, but the resources the females need are clustered together. This creates a group of females, and the resources they need, that a male can claim as his territory. This allows the male to be polygynous with minimal effort defending a resource-based territory. In the case of tropical thornytail iguanas, usually one group of lizards occurs per tree with one dominant male. In the few cases where two large adult males are found per tree, the older male took the dominant role and displayed the orange head and black body of a sexually mature male, whereas the other male displayed the coloration patterns of an adult female. The lack of coloration shown by the younger male may be because the presence of a large old male suppresses the reproductive receptivity of the younger male. In cases where only one lizard is in a tree, it is generally a male.

== Reproduction ==
The breeding season for this species appears to be extended, based on observations of juveniles of different sizes in a single tree. During the breeding season, males become more territorial and engage in displays of head bobbing and body movements to warn away other males that may try to infringe on their territories. These displays are also used to attract potential mates. Like most reptiles, tropical thornytail iguanas are oviparous and lay clutches of eggs. For this species, clutches are usually two eggs per female, and clutches of one egg are very rare. The eggs are laid in nests deep within the holes of trees inhabited by a group of tropical thornytail iguanas.

== Conservation ==
The conservation status of the tropical thornytail iguana is currently uncertain, but the loss of the species' preferred habitat to deforestation could be the main threat to the species.
