= Tropidurus jaguaribanus =

Conservation status
- Data Deficient (IUCN 3.1)

Scientific classification
- Kingdom: Animalia
- Phylum: Chordata
- Class: Reptilia
- Order: Squamata
- Suborder: Iguania
- Family: Tropiduridae
- Genus: Tropidurus
- Species: T. jaguaribanus

Binomial name
- Tropidurus jaguaribanus Passos, Lima, & Borges-Nojosa, 2011

Species of lizard

Tropidurus jaguaribanus is a species of lizard of the Tropiduridae family. It is found in Ceará, Brazil.
