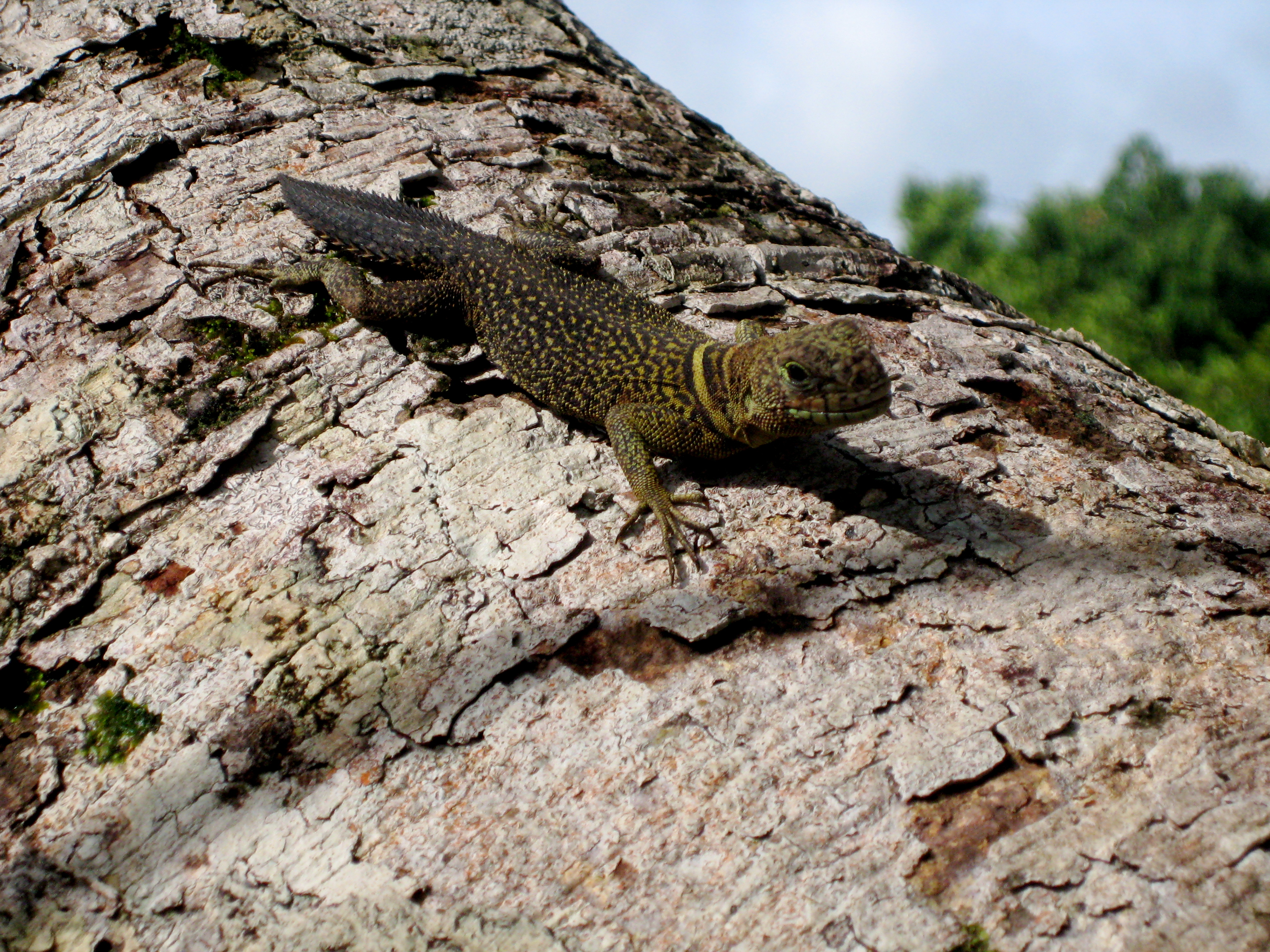
- Tropical thornytail iguana (Uracentron flaviceps)

Scientific classification
- Kingdom: Animalia
- Phylum: Chordata
- Class: Reptilia
- Order: Squamata
- Suborder: Iguania
- Family: Tropiduridae
- Genus: Uracentron; Kaup, 1826

Species
- 2 spp., see text

= Uracentron =

Genus of lizards

Uracentron is a genus of tropidurid lizards found in forests in northern South America. It contains only two species, which are both arboreal, have a relatively short spiny tail, and mainly feed on ants.

== Species ==
- Uracentron azureum (Linnaeus, 1758) – green thornytail iguana
- Uracentron flaviceps (Guichenot, 1855) – tropical thornytail iguana
