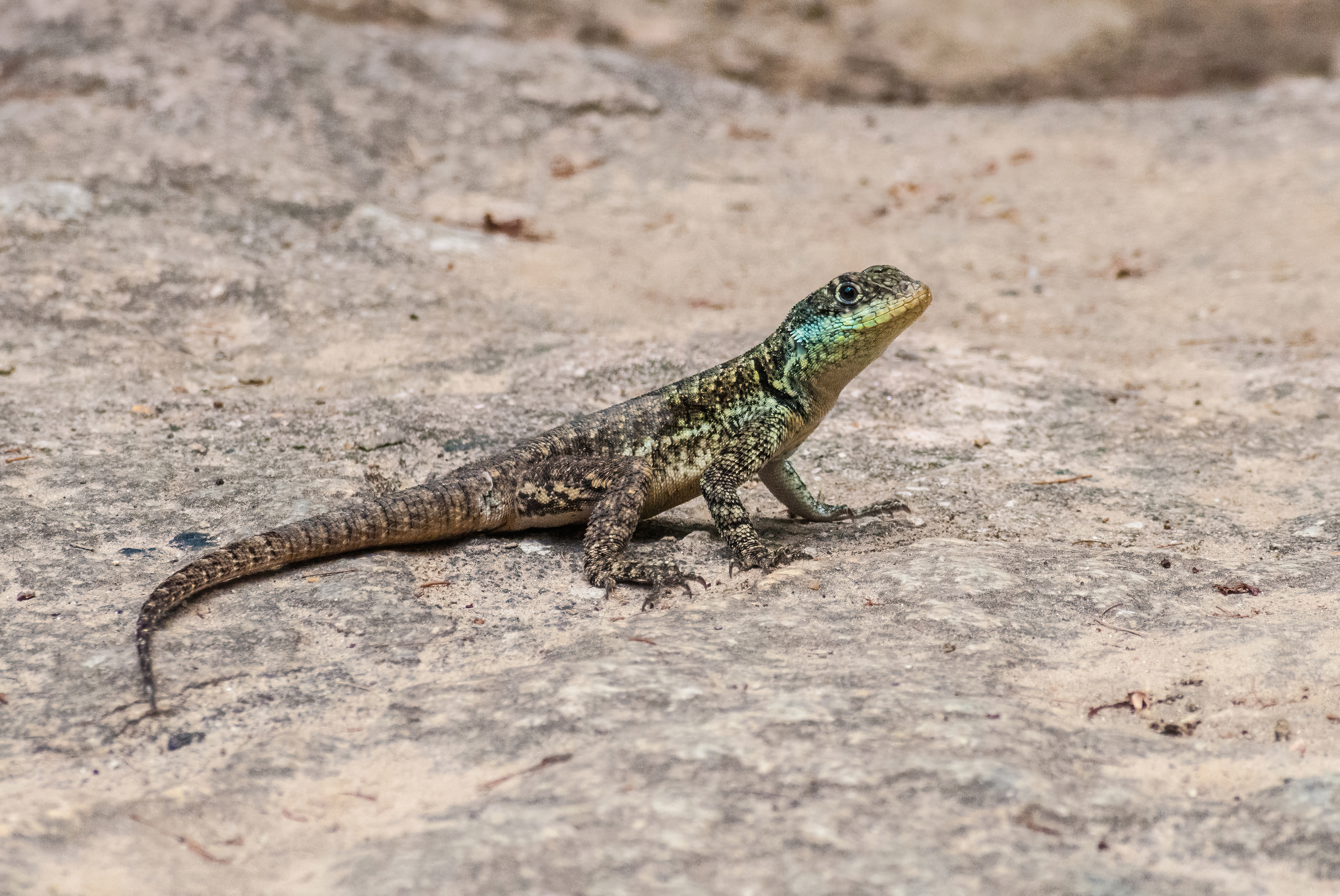

Conservation status
- Least Concern (IUCN 3.1)

Scientific classification
- Kingdom: Animalia
- Phylum: Chordata
- Class: Reptilia
- Order: Squamata
- Suborder: Iguania
- Family: Tropiduridae
- Genus: Tropidurus
- Species: T. torquatus

Binomial name
- Tropidurus torquatus (Wied-Neuwied, 1820)

Synonyms
- Stellio torquatus Wied-Neuwied, 1820; Agama operculata Lichtenstein, 1822; Agama brasiliensis Raddi, 1823; Agama tuberculata Spix, 1825; Tropidurus torquatus — Wied-Neuwied, 1825; Taraguira torquata — Gray, 1845; Taraguira darwinii Gray, 1845; Tropidurus torquatus — Boulenger, 1885

= Tropidurus torquatus =

Species of lizard

Tropidurus torquatus is a species of lizard in the family Tropiduridae, the Neotropical ground lizards. Its common name is Amazon lava lizard. The species is endemic to South America. There are no subspecies.

== Etymology ==
The specific name, torquatus, is Latin meaning "adorned with a neck chain or collar".

== Geographic range ==
Native to South America, Tropidurus torquatus is found in Argentina, Bolivia, Brazil, Colombia, French Guiana, Guyana, and Suriname. It is one of the most widely distributed species of the genus Tropidurus.

== Description ==
Tropidurus torquatus is a medium-sized lizard with a relatively large head. Its scales are overlapping. The reproductively mature female ranges from 7 to 10 cm (2.8 to 3.9 in) snout-to-vent length (SVL). One sample of adult males had a mean SVL of 8.68 cm (3.42 in), while another found a mean SVL of 11 to 12 cm (4.3 to 4.7 in).

== Habitat ==
Tropidurus torquatus lives mainly in open habitat types, especially restinga, part of the Atlantic Forest biome. It may occupy disturbed and degraded restinga. It is also known from the Abrolhos Archipelago, indicating that it can colonize offshore islands. It lives in the Cerrado. It may be found in residential areas, where it is adept at climbing the walls of houses. It is mostly ground-dwelling, living in termite nests and on or under rocks and logs. It is associated with many other animals, including giant ameiva, coati, brown capuchin, guira cuckoo, and false coral snake.

== Diet ==
The species Tropidurus torquatus is omnivorous, eating invertebrates and plant material. It favors ants, and it prefers the fruits and flowers of plants. It commonly eats the fruits of Chomelia obtusa, Ficus luschnathiana (called higuerón), and smilaxes. It especially favors the fruit of Erythroxylum ovalifolium (little coca) during the summer.

== Territoriality ==
The male of the species Tropidurus torquatus is territorial. The male performs signalling behaviors such as head-bobbing and tail-whipping and exhibits aggressive behaviors such as chasing and fighting with other males. Larger, faster males tend to dominate higher-quality territories, such as those with many hiding places and abundant sunlight. Females prefer higher-quality territories and accept the males guarding them; a male may have access to a harem of several females in a good habitat.

== Reproduction ==
The female Tropidurus torquatus may lay several eggs at a time, but a clutch of two is common, particularly in coastal areas. Clutch sizes may be larger in other geographical ranges.

== Bipedalism ==
Another notable behavior of Tropidurus torquatus is occasional bipedal locomotion. It can run relatively quickly on its hind feet for a limited distance. It carries its body in an oblique position, lifting its hindlimbs high. It swings its forelimbs in phase with its hindlimbs, i.e., swinging its right forelimb as its right hindlimb comes up, and its left with its left.

== Biology ==
Other aspects of the biology of Tropidurus torquatus have been well-studied, from the production and morphology of its spermatozoa, to the histology of its liver, kidneys, and red blood cells. An inventory of the parasites inside the bodies of a number of lizards found three nematode species, Physaloptera lutzi, Parapharyngodon bainae, and Oswaldofilaria chabaudi, as well as an unidentified tapeworm and an acanthocephalan.
