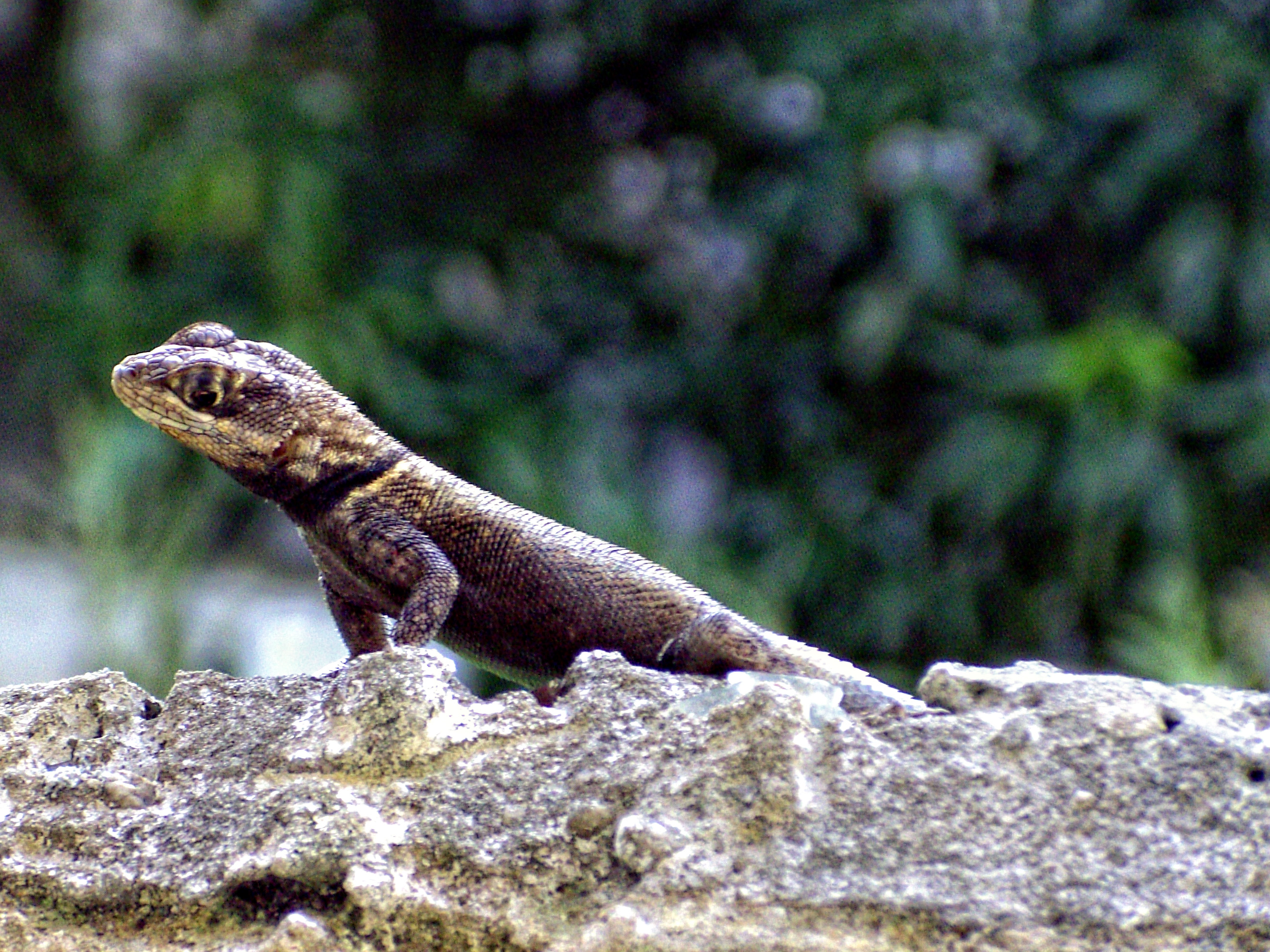

Conservation status
- Least Concern (IUCN 3.1)

Scientific classification
- Kingdom: Animalia
- Phylum: Chordata
- Class: Reptilia
- Order: Squamata
- Suborder: Iguania
- Family: Tropiduridae
- Genus: Tropidurus
- Species: T. oreadicus

Binomial name
- Tropidurus oreadicus Rodrigues, 1987

= Tropidurus oreadicus =

Species of lizard

Tropidurus oreadicus or better known in Brazil as calango is a species of lizard of the Tropiduridae family. It is endemic to Brazil and widely distributed in the biomes of Cerrado. and Caatinga.

Males grow to 104 mm (4.1 in) and females to 85 mm (3.3 in) in snout–vent length (SVL). The tail is 1.2–1.8 times SVL. It is oviparous. It has a reproductive period aligning with the rainy season in the biomes of Cerrado and Caatinga, it can also be found in urban environments. Examples being Belo Horizonte, Rio de Janeiro and others. The juveniles are slimmer meanwhile the adults are more robust, they have a detachable tail to distract predators.
