= Mite pocket =

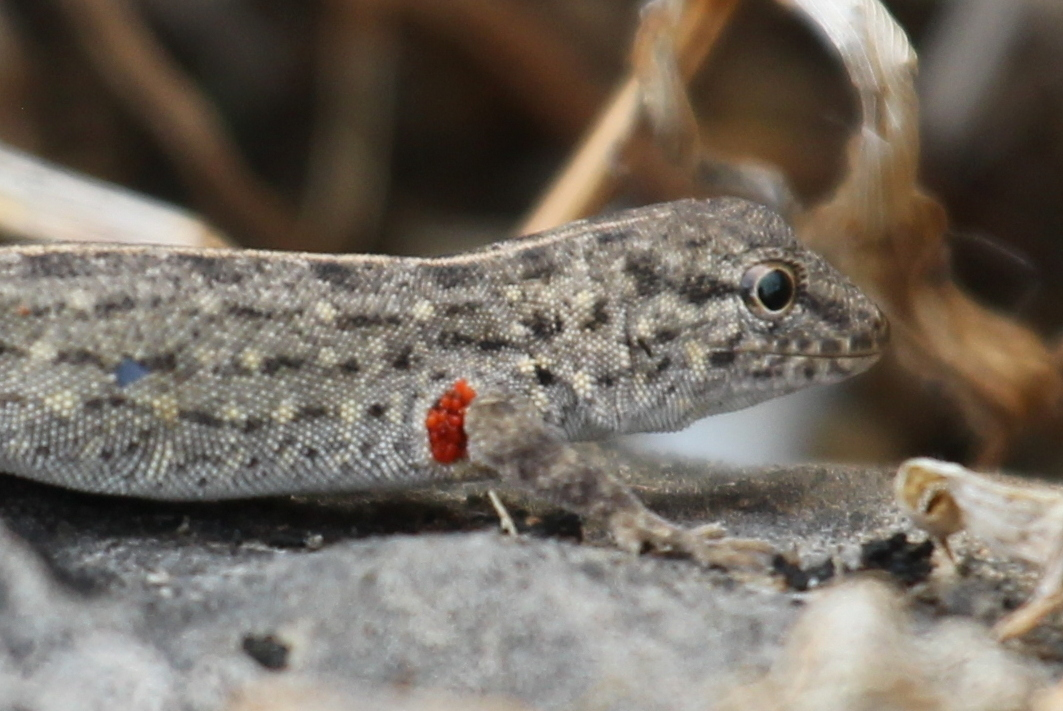
Mite pocket of Pristurus guweirensis

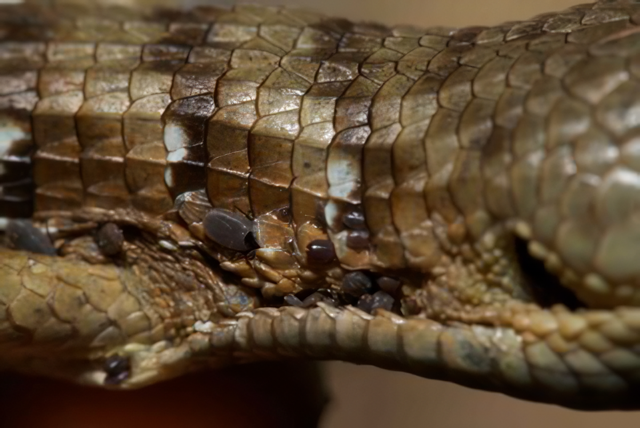
Ticks in the mite pocket on the neck of a northern alligator lizard

A mite pocket is an area on the body of a lizard that where biting mites congregate such as chiggers and ticks. They are slight depressions on the body, usually behind other appendages such as the legs and neck. These areas have smaller scales and increased blood vessels to entice the parasites to move there, while also being able to regenerate itself quickly, thus localizing the damage to only one part of the lizard's body.

This feature has evolved independently in five families of lizard and over 150 species of lizards, and are in particular most common in places that are warm and moist. For example, in western North America, Sceloporous species from the lowlands have evolved mite pockets due to the abundance of ticks in those habitats, while Callisaurus and Uta species that live in arid deserts do not need them. While herpetologist Edwin N. Arnold argued that the structures were evolutionary adaptations to concentrate mite activity to certain regions of the body to reduce overall tissue damage, other authors have argued that the structures are not adaptations but merely the result of the way skin develops and folds, in combination with adaptation to locomotion and crypsis, and that mites are simply drawn to these relatively vulnerable positions.
