= Eduardo Gudynas =

Uruguayan biologist and author

- Born: Eduardo Gudynas Silinskas; 1960; Montevideo, Uruguay
- Scientific career
- Fields: Environment, Zoology
- Author abbrev. (zoology): Gudynas

Eduardo Gudynas Silinskas (born 1960 in Montevideo) is a Uruguayan biologist and author specializing in environmental issues.

He is a member of the Latin American Center for Social Ecology (CLAES). He works as an associate researcher at the University of California, Davis. In 2016 he was the first Latin American person to obtain the Arne Næss Chair in Global Justice and the Environment from the University of Oslo; previous holders of the chair include James Lovelock, David Sloan Wilson and Ramachandra Guha.

== Selected works ==
- Muy lejos está cerca. Lima: RedGE, 2022.
- Extractivisms: Politics, Economy and Ecology'. Fernwood Publishing, 2021. ISBN 978-1773631769.
- Derechos y violencia en los extractivismos. Extrahecciones en Bolivia y América Latina (with O. Campanini and M. Gandarillas). Cochabamba: La Libre, 2020.
- Ciudadanía en movimiento: participación en conflictos ambientales (with Alain Santandreu). Montevideo: Ediciones trilce, 1998. ISBN 978-9974321991.
