= List of Eriocaulon species =

Eriocaulon is a large genus of flowering plants in the family Eriocaulaceae. As of May 2026 Plants of the World Online accepts 496 species in the genus.

== A ==
- Eriocaulon abyssinicum Hochst.
- Eriocaulon achiton Körn.
- Eriocaulon acutibracteatum W.L.Ma
- Eriocaulon acutifolium S.M.Phillips
- Eriocaulon adamesii Meikle
- Eriocaulon aethiopicum S.M.Phillips
- Eriocaulon africanum Hochst.
- Eriocaulon afzelianum Wikstr. ex Körn.
- Eriocaulon albocapitatum Kimp.
- Eriocaulon albosetaceum A.L.R.Oliveira
- Eriocaulon albotetrandra P.Biju, Josekutty & Augustine
- Eriocaulon alleizettei Moldenke
- Eriocaulon aloifolium R.J.Davies
- Eriocaulon alpestre Hook.f. & Thomson ex Körn.
- Eriocaulon alpinum P.Royen
- Eriocaulon altogibbosum Ruhland ex Pilg.
- Eriocaulon angustibracteum Kimp.
- Eriocaulon angustifolium Körn.
- Eriocaulon annamense Lecomte
- Eriocaulon ansarii Pradeep & Sunil
- Eriocaulon anshiense Punekar, Malpure & Lakshmin.
- Eriocaulon apetalum Punekar, Malpure & Lakshmin.
- Eriocaulon apiculatum Lecomte
- Eriocaulon aquaticum (Hill) Druce
- Eriocaulon aquatile Körn.
- Eriocaulon araguaiense A.L.R.Oliveira & C.P.Bove
- Eriocaulon arechavaletae Herter
- Eriocaulon arenicola Britton & Small
- Eriocaulon arupense P.Royen
- Eriocaulon asteroides S.M.Phillips
- Eriocaulon athertonense G.J.Leach
- Eriocaulon atratum Körn.
- Eriocaulon atrum Nakai
- Eriocaulon australasicum (F.Muell.) Körn.
- Eriocaulon australe R.Br.

== B ==
- Eriocaulon balakrishnanii Punekar, Lakshmin. & Vasudeva Rao
- Eriocaulon bamendae S.M.Phillips
- Eriocaulon barba-caprae Fyson
- Eriocaulon barbeyanum Ruhland
- Eriocaulon bassacense Moldenke
- Eriocaulon bastarense K.K.Khanna
- Eriocaulon batholithicola P.Royen
- Eriocaulon beauverdii Moldenke
- Eriocaulon belgaumensis Shimpale & S.R.Yadav
- Eriocaulon benedictum A.L.R.Oliveira
- Eriocaulon benthamii Kunth
- Eriocaulon bhutanicum Noltie
- Eriocaulon biappendiculatum Manudev, Robi & Nampy
- Eriocaulon bicolor Kimp.
- Eriocaulon bilobatum Morong
- Eriocaulon bolei Bole & M.R.Almeida
- Eriocaulon bongense Engl. & Ruhland
- Eriocaulon boni Lecomte
- Eriocaulon botocudo E.C.O.Chagas & Giul.
- Eriocaulon brachypeplon Körn.
- Eriocaulon brevipedunculatum Merr.
- Eriocaulon breviscapum Körn.
- Eriocaulon bromelioideum Lecomte
- Eriocaulon brownianum Mart.
- Eriocaulon brunonis Britten
- Eriocaulon buchananii Ruhland
- Eriocaulon buergerianum Körn.
- Eriocaulon burttii S.M.Phillips

== C ==
- Eriocaulon caaguazuense Ruhland
- Eriocaulon cabralense Silveira
- Eriocaulon caesium Griseb.
- Eriocaulon candango E.C.O.Chagas
- Eriocaulon capitulatum Moldenke
- Eriocaulon carajense Moldenke
- Eriocaulon carpentariae G.J.Leach
- Eriocaulon carsonii F.Muell.
- Eriocaulon catopsioides S.M.Phillips
- Eriocaulon celebicum P.Royen
- Eriocaulon ceylanicum Körn.
- Eriocaulon chandrae K.K.Khanna
- Eriocaulon chantaranothaii Praj. & J.Parn.
- Eriocaulon cheemenianum P.Biju, K.S.Prasad, Augustine & R.Ansari
- Eriocaulon cherrapunjianum R.Ansari & N.P.Balakr.
- Eriocaulon chiangmaiense Praj. & J.Parn.
- Eriocaulon chinorossicum Kom.
- Eriocaulon chloanthe S.M.Phillips
- Eriocaulon cinereum R.Br.
- Eriocaulon cipoense Silveira
- Eriocaulon clarksonii G.J.Leach
- Eriocaulon collettii Hook.f.
- Eriocaulon compressum Lam.
- Eriocaulon comptonii Rendle
- Eriocaulon concretum F.Muell.
- Eriocaulon congolense Moldenke
- Eriocaulon conicum (Fyson) C.E.C.Fisch.
- Eriocaulon coniferum Herzog
- Eriocaulon cookei Punekar, Malpure & Lakshmin.
- Eriocaulon cormosum Soulad., Praj. & Tagane
- Eriocaulon crassiscapum Bong.
- Eriocaulon crassiusculum Lye
- Eriocaulon cristatum Mart.
- Eriocaulon cryptocephalum S.M.Phillips & Mesterházy
- Eriocaulon cubense Ruhland
- Eriocaulon cuspidatum Dalzell
- Eriocaulon cylindratum A.L.R.Oliveira & C.P.Bove

== D ==
- Eriocaulon dalzellii Körn.
- Eriocaulon damazianum Beauverd
- Eriocaulon decangulare L.
- Eriocaulon decemflorum Maxim.
- Eriocaulon deightonii Meikle
- Eriocaulon densum Mart. ex Colla
- Eriocaulon denticulum Kimp.
- Eriocaulon depauperatum Merr.
- Eriocaulon depressum R.Br. ex Sm.
- Eriocaulon desulavii Tzvelev
- Eriocaulon devendranii Vijaya Sankar, K.Ravik. & Ganesh Babu
- Eriocaulon dictyophyllum Körn.
- Eriocaulon diloloense Kimp.
- Eriocaulon dimerum (Giul. & E.B.Miranda) A.L.R.Oliveira
- Eriocaulon dimorphopetalum Moldenke
- Eriocaulon disepalum Ridl.
- Eriocaulon distichoides Mangen
- Eriocaulon dregei Hochst.
- Eriocaulon duthiei Hook.f.

== E ==
- Eriocaulon eberhardtii Lecomte
- Eriocaulon echinaceum P.Royen
- Eriocaulon echinospermoideum Ruhland
- Eriocaulon echinospermum C.Wright
- Eriocaulon echinulatum Mart.
- Eriocaulon edwardii Fyson
- Eriocaulon ehrenbergianum Klotzsch ex Körn.
- Eriocaulon ekmannii Ruhland
- Eriocaulon elegantulum Engl.
- Eriocaulon elenorae Fyson
- Eriocaulon elichrysoides Bong.
- Eriocaulon embatense Pramod, Haritha
- Eriocaulon ensiforme C.E.C.Fisch.
- Eriocaulon epapillosum Ruhland
- Eriocaulon epedunculatum Potdar, Anil Kumar bis, Otaghvari & Sonkar
- Eriocaulon ermeiense W.L.Ma ex Z.X.Zhang
- Eriocaulon escape B.F.Hansen
- Eriocaulon eurypeplon Körn.
- Eriocaulon exsertum Satake

== F ==
- Eriocaulon faberi Ruhland
- Eriocaulon fenestratum Bojer ex Körn.
- Eriocaulon fenshamii G.J.Leach
- Eriocaulon fistulosum R.Br. ex Sm.
- Eriocaulon flumineum Moldenke
- Eriocaulon fluviatile Trimen
- Eriocaulon fuliginosum Griseb.
- Eriocaulon fulvum N.E.Br.
- Eriocaulon fuscum S.M.Phillips
- Eriocaulon fysonii R.Ansari & N.P.Balakr.

== G ==
- Eriocaulon gardnerianum A.L.R.Oliveira
- Eriocaulon gibbosum Körn.
- Eriocaulon giganticum R.J.Davies
- Eriocaulon giluwense P.Royen
- Eriocaulon glabripetalum W.L.Ma
- Eriocaulon glandulosum Kimp.
- Eriocaulon glaucum Griff.
- Eriocaulon goaense Kolte, I.Yadav & Janarth.
- Eriocaulon gomphrenoides Kunth
- Eriocaulon gopalakrishnanum K.Rashmi & G.Krishnak.
- Eriocaulon graphitinum F.Muell. & Tate ex Ewart & Cookson
- Eriocaulon gregatum Körn.
- Eriocaulon griseum Körn.
- Eriocaulon guyanense Körn. ex D.Dietr.

== H ==
- Eriocaulon hamiltonianum Mart.
- Eriocaulon hayatanum T.Koyama
- Eriocaulon heleocharioides Satake
- Eriocaulon helferi Hook.f.
- Eriocaulon henryanum Ruhland
- Eriocaulon herzogii Moldenke
- Eriocaulon heterochiton Körn.
- Eriocaulon heterodoxum Moldenke
- Eriocaulon heterolepis Steud.
- Eriocaulon heteromallum Bong.
- Eriocaulon heteropeplon Silveira
- Eriocaulon hildebrandtii Körn. ex Ruhland
- Eriocaulon homotepalum T.Koyama
- Eriocaulon hookerianum Stapf
- Eriocaulon hooperae Moldenke
- Eriocaulon huanchacanum Hensold
- Eriocaulon huianum Ruhland
- Eriocaulon humboldtii Kunth
- Eriocaulon hydrophilum Markötter

== I ==
- Eriocaulon ibeji E.C.O.Chagas
- Eriocaulon inapertum G.J.Leach
- Eriocaulon infaustum N.E.Br.
- Eriocaulon infirmum Steud.
- Eriocaulon insectum Baleeiro & R.W.Jobson
- Eriocaulon inundatum Moldenke
- Eriocaulon inyangense Arw.
- Eriocaulon iringense S.M.Phillips
- Eriocaulon irregulare Meikle
- Eriocaulon itapevense Alff & Stützel

== J ==
- Eriocaulon jaliscanum S.Watson
- Eriocaulon japonicum Körn.
- Eriocaulon jauense Moldenke
- Eriocaulon johnstonii Ruhland
- Eriocaulon jordanii (Moldenke) Meikle

== K ==
- Eriocaulon kainantense Masam.
- Eriocaulon kanarense Punekar, Watve & Lakshmin.
- Eriocaulon karaavalense Darsh., R.K.Choudhary, Datar & G.R.Rao
- Eriocaulon karnatakense S.P.Gaikwad, Sardesai, U.S.Yadav & S.R.Yadav
- Eriocaulon kinabaluense P.Royen
- Eriocaulon kinlochii Moldenke
- Eriocaulon kiusianum Maxim.
- Eriocaulon koernickei Britton
- Eriocaulon koernickianum Van Heurck & Müll.Arg.
- Eriocaulon kolhapurense S.P.Gaikwad, Sardesai & S.R.Yadav
- Eriocaulon komarovii Tzvelev
- Eriocaulon koynense Punekar, Mungikar & Lakshmin.
- Eriocaulon kulumi E.C.O.Chagas & Giul.
- Eriocaulon kunmingense Z.X.Zhang

== L ==
- Eriocaulon lanatum H.E.Hess
- Eriocaulon lanceolatum Miq. ex Körn.
- Eriocaulon laniceps S.M.Phillips
- Eriocaulon lanigerum Lecomte
- Eriocaulon laosense Moldenke
- Eriocaulon lasiolepis Ruhland
- Eriocaulon latifolium Sm.
- Eriocaulon laxifolium Körn.
- Eriocaulon leianthum W.L.Ma
- Eriocaulon leptophyllum Kunth
- Eriocaulon leucogenes Ridl.
- Eriocaulon leucomelas Steud.
- Eriocaulon liberisepalum Z.X.Zhang
- Eriocaulon ligulatum (Vell.) L.B.Sm.
- Eriocaulon lineare Small
- Eriocaulon linearifolium Körn.
- Eriocaulon linearitepalum Kimp.
- Eriocaulon lividum F.Muell.
- Eriocaulon longibracteatum Khorngton, Soulad. & Praj.
- Eriocaulon longicuspe Hook.f.
- Eriocaulon longipedunculatum Lecomte
- Eriocaulon longipetalum Rendle
- Eriocaulon longirostrum Silveira & Ruhland
- Eriocaulon lustratum P.Royen

== M ==
- Eriocaulon macrobolax Körn.
- Eriocaulon maculatum Schinz
- Eriocaulon madagascariense Moldenke
- Eriocaulon madayiparense Swapna, K.P.Rajesh, Manju & Prakashk.
- Eriocaulon magnificum Ruhland
- Eriocaulon magnum Abbiatti
- Eriocaulon majusculum Ruhland
- Eriocaulon malabaricum Pradeep & Nampy
- Eriocaulon mamfeense Meikle
- Eriocaulon mangshanense W.L.Ma
- Eriocaulon manilalianum Chandore, Borude, Madhav & Gosavi
- Eriocaulon mannii N.E.Br.
- Eriocaulon margaretae Fyson
- Eriocaulon maronderanum S.M.Phillips
- Eriocaulon martianum (Wall. ex Fyson) Wall. ex R.Ansari & N.P.Balakr.
- Eriocaulon matopense Rendle
- Eriocaulon mbalensis S.M.Phillips
- Eriocaulon meeboldii R.Ansari & N.P.Balakr.
- Eriocaulon meenachilense Balan & Robi
- Eriocaulon megapotamicum Malme
- Eriocaulon meiklei Moldenke
- Eriocaulon melanocephalum Kunth
- Eriocaulon mesanthemoides Ruhland
- Eriocaulon microcephalum Kunth
- Eriocaulon mikawanum Satake & T.Koyama
- Eriocaulon milhoense Herzog
- Eriocaulon minimum Lam.
- Eriocaulon minusculum Moldenke
- Eriocaulon minutissimum Ruhland
- Eriocaulon minutum Hook.f.
- Eriocaulon miquelianum Körn.
- Eriocaulon mirzapurense K.K.Khanna & An.Kumar
- Eriocaulon miserrimum Ruhland
- Eriocaulon miserum Körn.
- Eriocaulon misionum A.Cast.
- Eriocaulon mitophylum Hook.f.
- Eriocaulon modestum Kunth
- Eriocaulon modicum S.M.Phillips
- Eriocaulon mokalense Moldenke
- Eriocaulon molinae L.O.Williams
- Eriocaulon monococcon Nakai
- Eriocaulon monoscapum F.Muell.
- Eriocaulon montanum P.Royen
- Eriocaulon mulanjeanum S.M.Phillips
- Eriocaulon multiscapum A.L.R.Oliveira
- Eriocaulon mutatum N.E.Br.

== N ==
- Eriocaulon nadjae S.M.Phillips
- Eriocaulon nairii Chandrab. & V.Chandras.
- Eriocaulon nantoense Hayata
- Eriocaulon nanum R.Br.
- Eriocaulon nautiliforme Lecomte
- Eriocaulon nautiliformoides Praj. & J.Parn.
- Eriocaulon naviculum A.L.R.Oliveira
- Eriocaulon neglectum Ruhland
- Eriocaulon nematophyllum G.J.Leach
- Eriocaulon neocaledonicum Schltr.
- Eriocaulon nepalense J.D.Prescott ex Bong.
- Eriocaulon nigericum Meikle
- Eriocaulon nigriceps Merr.
- Eriocaulon nigrobracteatum E.L.Bridges & Orzell
- Eriocaulon nigrocapitatum Kimp.
- Eriocaulon nigrum Lecomte
- Eriocaulon novoguineense P.Royen
- Eriocaulon nudicuspe Maxim.

== O ==
- Eriocaulon obclavatum Satake
- Eriocaulon obtriangulare Kimp.
- Eriocaulon obtusum Ruhland
- Eriocaulon odashimai Masam.
- Eriocaulon odontospermum G.J.Leach
- Eriocaulon odoratum Dalzell
- Eriocaulon officinale Körn.
- Eriocaulon oreadum P.Royen
- Eriocaulon oryzetorum Mart.
- Eriocaulon ovoideum Britton & Small
- Eriocaulon ozense T.Koyama

== P – Q ==
- Eriocaulon pachystroma P.Royen
- Eriocaulon palghatense R.Ansari & N.P.Balakr.
- Eriocaulon pallescens (Nakai) Satake
- Eriocaulon pallidum R.Br.
- Eriocaulon paludicola Silveira
- Eriocaulon palustre Salm-Dyck ex Steud.
- Eriocaulon panagudianum R.Ansari & N.P.Balakr.
- Eriocaulon panamense Moldenke
- Eriocaulon pancheri Lecomte ex Guillaumin & Beauvis.
- Eriocaulon pandeyana Nampy, Harishma & M.Vishnu
- Eriocaulon papillosum Körn.
- Eriocaulon paraguayense Körn.
- Eriocaulon parkeri B.L.Rob.
- Eriocaulon parnellii Praj. & Chantar.
- Eriocaulon parvicapitulatum Moldenke
- Eriocaulon parvicephalum Darsh., R.K.Choudhary, Datar & Tamhankar
- Eriocaulon parviflorum (Fyson) R.Ansari & N.P.Balakr.
- Eriocaulon parvitepalum Kimp.
- Eriocaulon parvulum S.M.Phillips
- Eriocaulon parvum Körn.
- Eriocaulon patericola G.J.Leach
- Eriocaulon pectinatum Ruhland
- Eriocaulon peninsulare Punekar & Lakshmin.
- Eriocaulon periyarense Sunil, Naveen Kum. & Remya Kr.
- Eriocaulon perplexum Satake & H.Hara
- Eriocaulon peruvianum Ruhland
- Eriocaulon petraeum S.M.Phillips & Burgt
- Eriocaulon phatamense Praj. & Chantar.
- Eriocaulon philippo-coburgii Szyszyl. ex Wawra
- Eriocaulon phuchongense Praj. & Chantar.
- Eriocaulon phuphanense Praj. & J.Parn.
- Eriocaulon phuphanoides Praj. & J.Parn.
- Eriocaulon pictum Fritsch
- Eriocaulon pilgeri Ruhland
- Eriocaulon piliflorum Ruhland
- Eriocaulon pilosissimum P.Royen
- Eriocaulon pioraense P.Royen
- Eriocaulon plumale N.E.Br.
- Eriocaulon plumbeum Mart. ex Colla
- Eriocaulon polhillii S.M.Phillips
- Eriocaulon poluense F.T.Wang & Tang
- Eriocaulon porembskii S.M.Phillips & Mesterházy
- Eriocaulon pringlei S.Watson
- Eriocaulon psammophilum S.M.Phillips
- Eriocaulon pseudocompressum Ruhland
- Eriocaulon pseudoescape Prajaksood & Chantar.
- Eriocaulon pseudoquinquangulare Ruhland
- Eriocaulon pseudotruncatum Z.X.Zhang
- Eriocaulon pubigerum Bong.
- Eriocaulon pulchellum Körn.
- Eriocaulon pulvinatum P.Royen
- Eriocaulon pusillum R.Br.
- Eriocaulon pyatan E.C.O.Chagas & Giul.
- Eriocaulon pygmaeum Sol. ex Sm.
- Eriocaulon pykarense Nampy & Manudev
- Eriocaulon quinquangulare L.

== R ==
- Eriocaulon radiosum (Ruhland) A.L.R.Oliveira
- Eriocaulon raipurense K.K.Khanna & Mudgal & An.Kumar
- Eriocaulon rajendrababui R.Ansari & N.P.Balakr.
- Eriocaulon ramnadense R.Ansari & N.P.Balakr.
- Eriocaulon ramocaulon Kimp.
- Eriocaulon ratnagiricum S.R.Yadav, S.P.Gaikwad & Sardesai
- Eriocaulon ravenelii Chapm.
- Eriocaulon ravii Shaju, Rajendrapr., A.V.Raghu, Rijuraj & Ashi
- Eriocaulon rayatianum Chandore, Borude & S.R.Yadav
- Eriocaulon recurvibracteum Kimp.
- Eriocaulon redactum Ruhland
- Eriocaulon regnellii Moldenke
- Eriocaulon reitzii Moldenke & L.B.Sm.
- Eriocaulon remotum Lecomte
- Eriocaulon rhodae Fyson
- Eriocaulon richardianum (Fyson) R.Ansari & N.P.Balakr.
- Eriocaulon ritchieanum Ruhland
- Eriocaulon rivicola G.J.Leach, M.D.Barrett & R.L.Barrett
- Eriocaulon robustobrownianum Ruhland
- Eriocaulon robustum Steud.
- Eriocaulon rockianum Hand.-Mazz.
- Eriocaulon rosenii (Pax) Lye
- Eriocaulon roseum Fyson
- Eriocaulon rosulatum Körn.
- Eriocaulon rouxianum Steud.
- Eriocaulon rubescens Moldenke
- Eriocaulon rufum Lecomte

== S ==
- Eriocaulon saccatum P.Royen
- Eriocaulon sachalinense Miyabe & Nakai
- Eriocaulon sanjappae M.K.Akhil & Nampy
- Eriocaulon santapaui Moldenke
- Eriocaulon scariosum Sm.
- Eriocaulon schiedeanum Körn.
- Eriocaulon schimperi Körn. ex Ruhland
- Eriocaulon schippii Standl. ex Moldenke
- Eriocaulon schischkinii Tzvelev
- Eriocaulon schlechteri Ruhland
- Eriocaulon schochianum Hand.-Mazz.
- Eriocaulon schultzii Benth.
- Eriocaulon sclerocephalum Ruhland
- Eriocaulon sclerophyllum W.L.Ma
- Eriocaulon scorpionensis P.Royen
- Eriocaulon scullionii G.J.Leach
- Eriocaulon sedgwickii Fyson
- Eriocaulon seemannii Moldenke
- Eriocaulon sellowianum Kunth
- Eriocaulon selousii S.M.Phillips
- Eriocaulon senegalense N.E.Br.
- Eriocaulon sessile Meikle
- Eriocaulon setaceum L.
- Eriocaulon sexangulare L.
- Eriocaulon sharmae R.Ansari & N.P.Balakr.
- Eriocaulon shrirangii Chandore, Borude, Bhalekar, Madhav & Gosavi
- Eriocaulon siamense Moldenke
- Eriocaulon sigmoideum C.Wright
- Eriocaulon silicicola Ridl.
- Eriocaulon silveirae Moldenke
- Eriocaulon similischimperi Kimp.
- Eriocaulon similitepalum Kimp.
- Eriocaulon sinealaeum Kimp.
- Eriocaulon singulare Moldenke
- Eriocaulon sivarajanii R.Ansari & N.P.Balakr.
- Eriocaulon smitinandii Moldenke
- Eriocaulon sollyanum Royle
- Eriocaulon sonderianum Körn.
- Eriocaulon soucherei Moldenke
- Eriocaulon spectabile F.Muell.
- Eriocaulon spongiola Hensold
- Eriocaulon spongiosifolium Silveira
- riocaulon spruceanum Körn.
- Eriocaulon stellulatum Körn.
- Eriocaulon stenophyllum R.E.Fr.
- Eriocaulon steyermarkii Moldenke
- Eriocaulon stipantepalum Kimp.
- Eriocaulon striatum Lam.
- Eriocaulon strictum Milne-Redh.
- Eriocaulon subglaucum Ruhland
- Eriocaulon submersum Welw. ex Rendle
- Eriocaulon sulanum S.M.Phillips & Burgt
- Eriocaulon sumatranum Ruhland

== T ==
- Eriocaulon taeniophyllum S.M.Phillips
- Eriocaulon taishanense F.Z.Li
- Eriocaulon takae Koidz.
- Eriocaulon talbotii R.Ansari & N.P.Balakr.
- Eriocaulon tanakae Ruhland
- Eriocaulon taquetii Lecomte
- Eriocaulon tenuifolium Klotzsch ex Körn.
- Eriocaulon tepicanum Moldenke
- Eriocaulon teusczii Engl. & Ruhland
- Eriocaulon texense Körn.
- Eriocaulon thailandicum Moldenke
- Eriocaulon thouarsii Lecomte
- Eriocaulon thwaitesii Körn.
- Eriocaulon thysanocephalum S.M.Phillips
- Eriocaulon tingilomum S.M.Phillips & Mesterházy
- Eriocaulon togoense Moldenke
- Eriocaulon tonkinense Ruhland
- Eriocaulon tortuosum F.Muell.
- Eriocaulon transvaalicum N.E.Br.
- Eriocaulon tricornum G.J.Leach
- Eriocaulon trilobatum Ruhland
- Eriocaulon trisectoides Satake
- Eriocaulon truncatum Buch.-Ham. ex Mart.
- Eriocaulon tuberiferum A.R.Kulk. & Desai
- Eriocaulon tubiflorum P.Royen
- Eriocaulon tuyamae Satake

== U – V ==
- Eriocaulon ubonense Lecomte
- Eriocaulon ulaei Ruhland
- Eriocaulon ussuriense Körn. ex Regel
- Eriocaulon vamanae Dani & Nampy
- Eriocaulon vandaanamense Sunil, Ratheesh & Sivad.
- Eriocaulon varium Kimp.
- Eriocaulon vasudevanii R.Ansari & N.P.Balakr.
- Eriocaulon vaupesense Moldenke
- Eriocaulon vientianense Soulad. & Praj.
- Eriocaulon volkensii Engl.

== W ==
- Eriocaulon walkeri Hook.f.
- Eriocaulon wayanadense Vivek, Swapna & K.K.Suresh
- Eriocaulon weddellianum A.L.R.Oliveira
- Eriocaulon welwitschii Rendle
- Eriocaulon wightianum Mart.
- Eriocaulon wildii S.M.Phillips
- Eriocaulon willdenovianum Moldenke
- Eriocaulon williamsii Moldenke
- Eriocaulon wolseleyi G.J.Leach
- Eriocaulon woodsonianum Moldenke

== X, Y, Z ==
- Eriocaulon xenopodion T.Koyama
- Eriocaulon xeranthemum Mart.
- Eriocaulon yba E.C.O.Chagas & Giul.
- Eriocaulon zambesiense Ruhland
- Eriocaulon zollingerianum Körn.
- Eriocaulon zyotanii Satake
