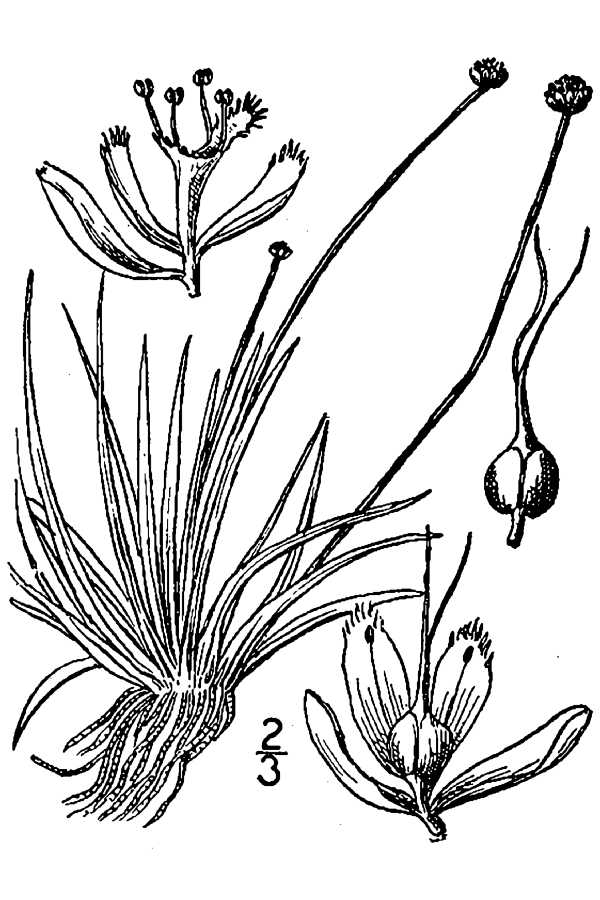
- Eriocaulon parkeri

Conservation status
- Vulnerable (NatureServe)

Scientific classification
- Kingdom: Plantae
- Clade: Tracheophytes
- Clade: Angiosperms
- Clade: Monocots
- Clade: Commelinids
- Order: Poales
- Family: Eriocaulaceae
- Genus: Eriocaulon
- Species: E. parkeri

Binomial name
- Eriocaulon parkeri B.L.Rob.

= Eriocaulon parkeri =

Species of flowering plant

Eriocaulon parkeri is a species of flowering plant in the pipewort family known by the common names Parker's pipewort and estuary pipewort. It is native to eastern North America, where its distribution spans the coast from Quebec to North Carolina. It is extirpated from New York and Pennsylvania, however.

This small aquatic monocotyledonous perennial herb produces narrow, linear, grasslike leaves up to about 9 centimeters long and flowering stems up to 30 centimeters tall, but generally reaching 1 to 20 centimeters. The flowering stem, or scape, is about a millimeter wide or less. It is topped with a grayish, buttonlike inflorescence just a few millimeters wide. This plant is similar to Eriocaulon aquaticum, but smaller. It is monoecious, with male and female flowers on the same plant. Flowering occurs in July through September.

This plant grows in coastal habitat types, such as mudflats, estuaries, and marshes, but in freshwater or slightly brackish water. It may be submerged at times. It grows in mud or cobbly gravel or sand. The substrate is often subject to scouring from water action, including tides and floods. The plant can tolerate a wide range of water chemistry. This species is associated with other plants such as Zizania aquatica, Ludwigia palustris, Isoetes riparia, Schoenoplectus pungens, Bidens eatonii, Bidens hyperborea, Persicaria punctata, Lindernia dubia var. inundata, Elatine minima, Elatine americana, Sagittaria subulata, Sagittaria latifolia, Sagittaria calycina, Acorus calamus, Limosella australis, Micranthemum micranthemoides, Pontederia cordata, Orontium aquaticum, and, in more brackish waters, Spartina alterniflora.

There are about 130 occurrences of this plant today, many of which are in Quebec and Maine. There are many known occurrences that are now believed extirpated. Threats to the species include habitat loss due to the development and alteration of coastal habitat. It may be affected by changes in hydrologic cycles, such as damming and tide gates. It depends on a cycle of sedimentation, as well; too much sediment buries plants and erosion removes the plant's substrate. Dredging directly and indirectly affects the plant's habitat. Water pollution and boat and ship activity are threats. Sea level rise could also affect the habitat.
