= L. acaulis =

L. acaulis may refer to:

- Limosella acaulis, a flowering plant species
- Lysipomia acaulis, a plant species endemic to Ecuador
