= Cleistesiopsis oricamporum =

Small Coastal Plain spreading pogonia

Scientific classification
- Kingdom: Plantae
- Clade: Tracheophytes
- Clade: Angiosperms
- Clade: Monocots
- Order: Asparagales
- Family: Orchidaceae
- Subfamily: Vanilloideae
- Genus: Cleistesiopsis
- Species: C. oricamporum

Binomial name
- Cleistesiopsis oricamporum P.M.Br.

Species of orchid

Cleistesiopsis oricamporum, called the small Coastal Plain spreading pogonia or small dragonhead pogonia, is a terrestrial species of orchid native to the southeastern United States from Louisiana to North Carolina.
