= Eriocaulon embatense =

Scientific classification
- Kingdom: Plantae
- Clade: Tracheophytes
- Clade: Angiosperms
- Clade: Monocots
- Clade: Commelinids
- Order: Poales
- Family: Eriocaulaceae
- Genus: Eriocaulon
- Species: E. embatense

Binomial name
- Eriocaulon embatense Pramod & Haritha

Species of plant

Eriocaulon embatense is a flowering herb of the family Eriocaulaceae (pipeworts).

== Description ==
Eriocaulon embatense is a herb growing up to 30–40 cm long. Roots are fibrous. The leaves are rosulate, linear and obtuse or acute glabrous; floating leaves are elongated and ribbon like. Sheaths up to 12.5 cm long, glabrous, apex split.

In male flowers, sepals are ovate, connate into a spathe. There are three short, equal or subequal petals, hoary toward the apex with a black gland. Female flowers have three free straw coloured unequal sepals, pedicels are minute. Three petals are equal or subequal. Ovary is stalked, orbicular and yellow. Seeds are yellow or yellowish orange and elliptic or ovoid. Flowering and fruiting season is September to December.

== Habitat ==
Grows in seasonal streams in low altitude laterite areas. It is endemic to southern Western Ghats and reported from Embate, Kannur and Moyolam, Periye, Kasaragod in Keralam.
