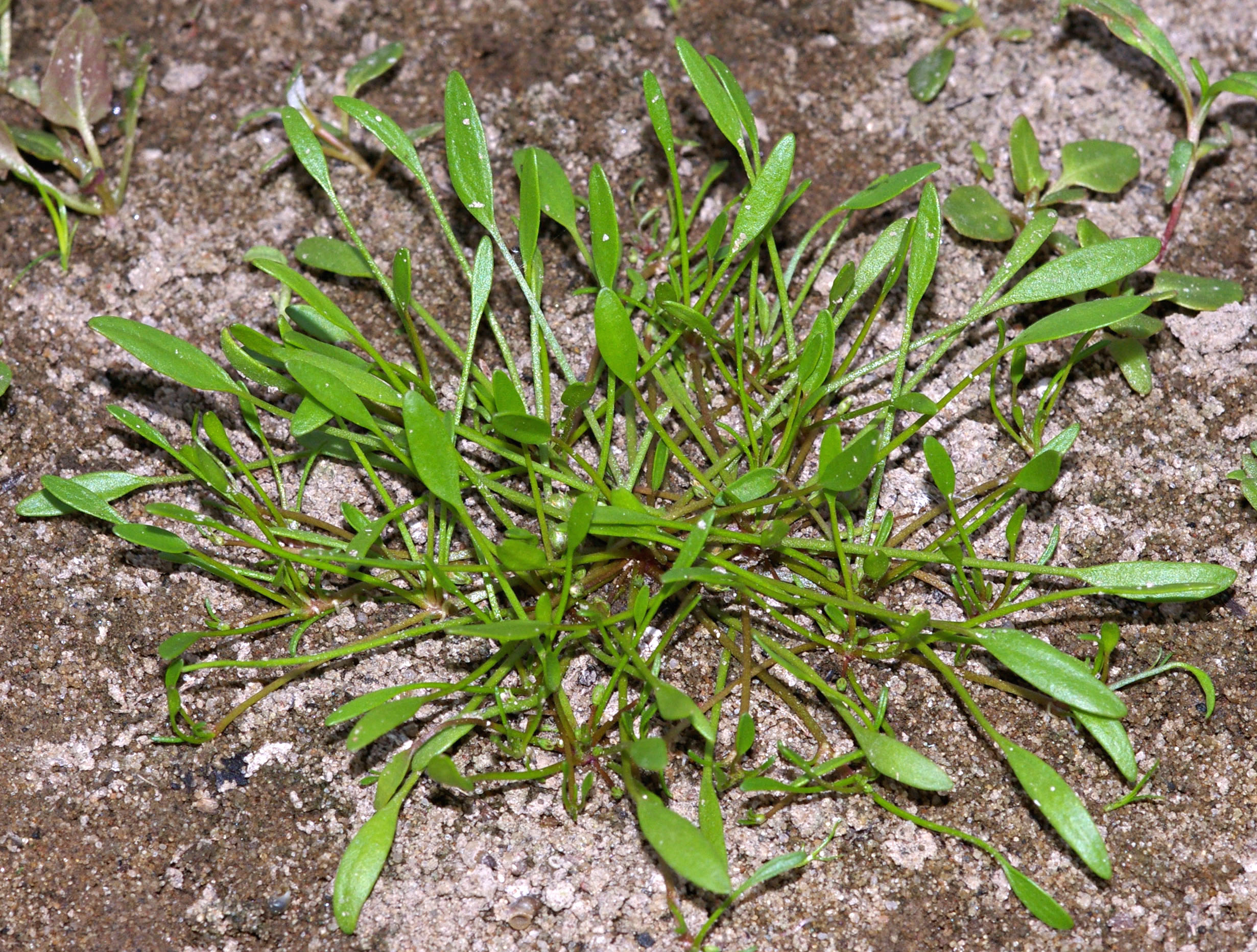
- Limosella aquatica

Scientific classification
- Kingdom: Plantae
- Clade: Tracheophytes
- Clade: Angiosperms
- Clade: Eudicots
- Clade: Asterids
- Order: Lamiales
- Family: Scrophulariaceae
- Tribe: Limoselleae
- Genus: Limosella; L. (1753)

Species
- 16; see text

Synonyms
- Danubiunculus Sailer (1845); Mutafinia Raf. (1833); Plantaginella Hill (1756); Ygramela Raf. (1833)

= Limosella =

Genus of flowering plants

Limosella is a genus of flowering plants known as mudworts. These are annual, largely aquatic plants, found in muddy areas worldwide. Its phylogeny and biogeography are inferred from molecular data.

== Species ==
16 species are accepted.

- Limosella acaulis Sessé & Moc. - Owyhee mudwort
- Limosella africana Glück
- Limosella aquatica L. - water mudwort
- Limosella australis R.Br. - Welsh mudwort
- Limosella capensis Thunb.
- Limosella curdieana F.Muell.
- Limosella grandiflora Benth.
- Limosella granitica W.R.Barker
- Limosella inflata Hilliard & B.L.Burtt
- Limosella longiflora Kuntze
- Limosella macrantha R.E.Fr.
- Limosella major Diels
- Limosella pretoriensis Suess.
- Limosella purpurea Charit.
- Limosella tenella Quézel & Contandr.
- Limosella vesiculosa Hilliard & B.L.Burtt
