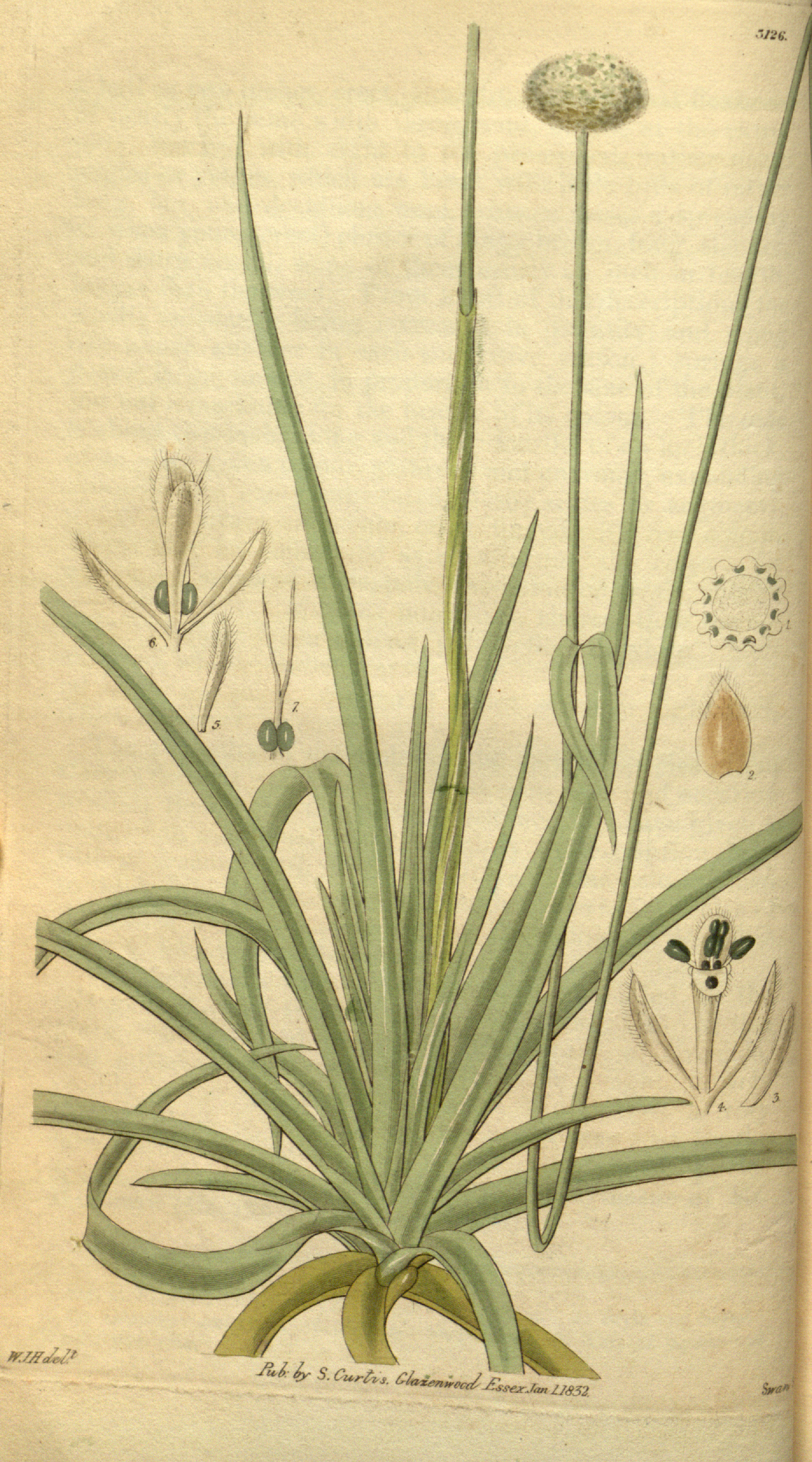
- Eriocaulon decangulare

Conservation status
- Secure (NatureServe)

Scientific classification
- Kingdom: Plantae
- Clade: Tracheophytes
- Clade: Angiosperms
- Clade: Monocots
- Clade: Commelinids
- Order: Poales
- Family: Eriocaulaceae
- Genus: Eriocaulon
- Species: E. decangulare

Binomial name
- Eriocaulon decangulare L.

= Eriocaulon decangulare =

Ten-angled pipewort

Species of flowering plant

Eriocaulon decangulare, commonly known as ten-angled pipewort, hat pin and bog button, is a monocotyledonous plant native to the eastern United States, Mexico and Nicaragua. The plant's distribution is quite irregular, with several disjunct populations and a discontinuous primary range. Most of its habitat in the United States is found on the Atlantic Coastal Plain. It is found in areas of relatively low elevation and does not occur higher than 300 metres above sea level. This plant is found in peat and sand that is moist to wet, and is associated with savannahs, bogs, pinelands, ditches and the banks of cypress domes.

There are two varieties ten-angled pipewort: E. decangulare var. decangulare, and E. decangulare var. latifolium.

== Distribution and habitat ==
Eriocaulon decangulare var. decangulare is found in the United States, Mexico and Central America. In the United States, it is distributed from New Jersey south to south Florida and west to southwest Arkansas and east Texas. It grows in bogs, seepage bogs and swamps, mafic fens and seeps, wind-tidal marshes, sea-level fens, and wet pine savannas and flatwoods.

Eriocaulon decangulare var. latifolium is restricted to Florida Panhandle, southern Alabama and Mississippi, with a disjunct population in northeast Florida. It is found in seepage bogs.

== Ecology ==
A study in North Carolina of three inland, mountainous populations found the ten-angled pipewort has a high affinity for acidic soil, ranging from a pH 4.1 to 5.2 in their samples. At all sites, 58 to 71% of all the plants it occurred with were either obligate or facultative wetland plants. Sphagnum mosses were another conspicuous element of the habitat, with 30 to 60% of the studied sites being covered with them. The results of the study suggest that Eriocaulon decangulare benefits from disturbance due to its affinity for high sunlight. The smallest population examined was in only 50% full sunlight, while the other two were in full sunlight more than 90% of the day and supported much larger populations. As such, the control of woody plant growth, either naturally or artificially, is important to maintain healthy populations of the plant. The ten-angled pipewort was found to occur with several rare or threatened wetland plants, such as Cleistes divaricata (spreading pogonia), Drosera rotundifolia (round-leaved sundew), Carex trichocarpa (hairy-fruit sedge) and Sanguisorba canadensis (Canada burnet), though these associations differed from site to site.
