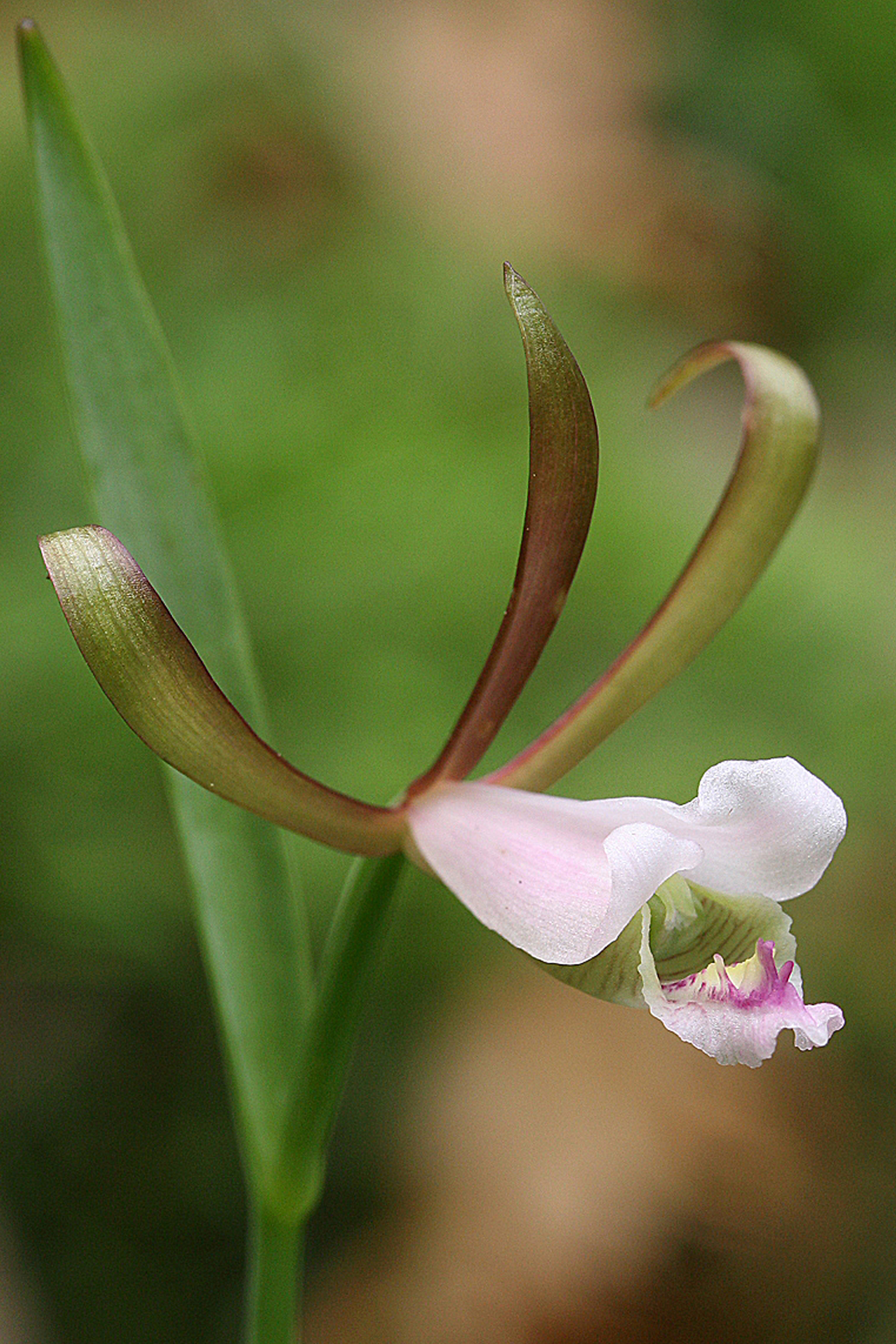

Conservation status
- Vulnerable (NatureServe)

Scientific classification
- Kingdom: Plantae
- Clade: Embryophytes
- Clade: Tracheophytes
- Clade: Spermatophytes
- Clade: Angiosperms
- Clade: Monocots
- Order: Asparagales
- Family: Orchidaceae
- Subfamily: Vanilloideae
- Genus: Cleistesiopsis
- Species: C. bifaria

Binomial name
- Cleistesiopsis bifaria (Fernald) Pansarin & F.Barros

Synonyms
- Cleistes divaricata var. bifaria Fernald; Cleistes bifaria (Fernald) Catling & Gregg; Pogonia bifaria (Fernald) P.M.Br. & Wunderlin

= Cleistesiopsis bifaria =

Species of orchid

Cleistesiopsis bifaria, the smaller spreading pogonia, is a terrestrial species of orchid native to the eastern United States, along the Appalachian Mountains from West Virginia to Alabama. It grows up to 2 feet (0.61 metres) tall. Flower petals are white or rose-pink in color with purple or pink venation. Its habitats include savannas, wet meadows, and pine or oak woodlands of ridgetops. The species is threatened by fire suppression, habitat loss, and invasive species.
