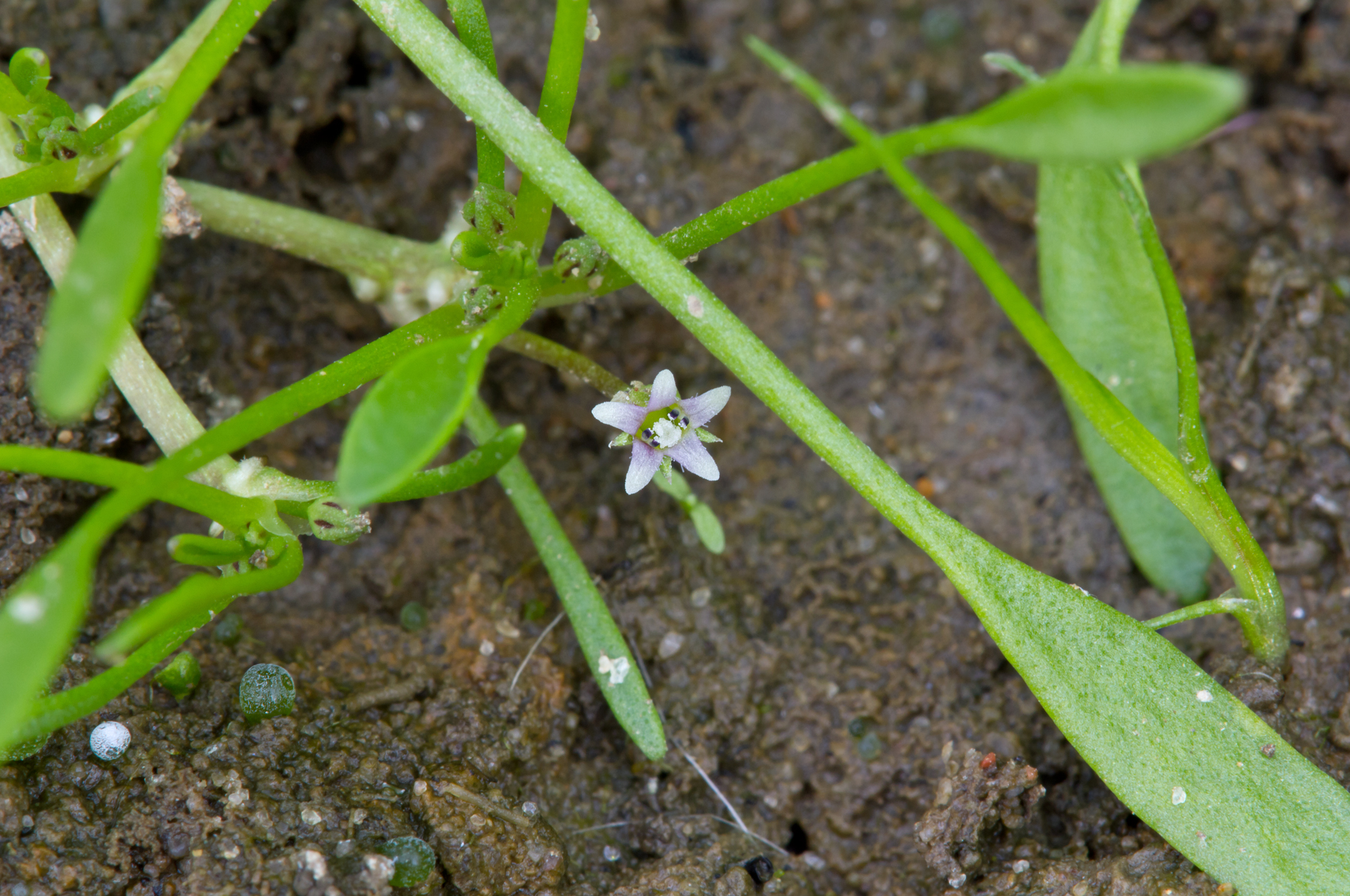

Conservation status
- Least Concern (IUCN 3.1)

Scientific classification
- Kingdom: Plantae
- Clade: Tracheophytes
- Clade: Angiosperms
- Clade: Eudicots
- Clade: Asterids
- Order: Lamiales
- Family: Scrophulariaceae
- Genus: Limosella
- Species: L. aquatica

Binomial name
- Limosella aquatica L.

Varieties
- L. a. var. alismoides Welw. ex Hiern; L. a. var. aquatica

Synonyms
- Plantaginella aquatica

= Limosella aquatica =

Plant species in the figwort family

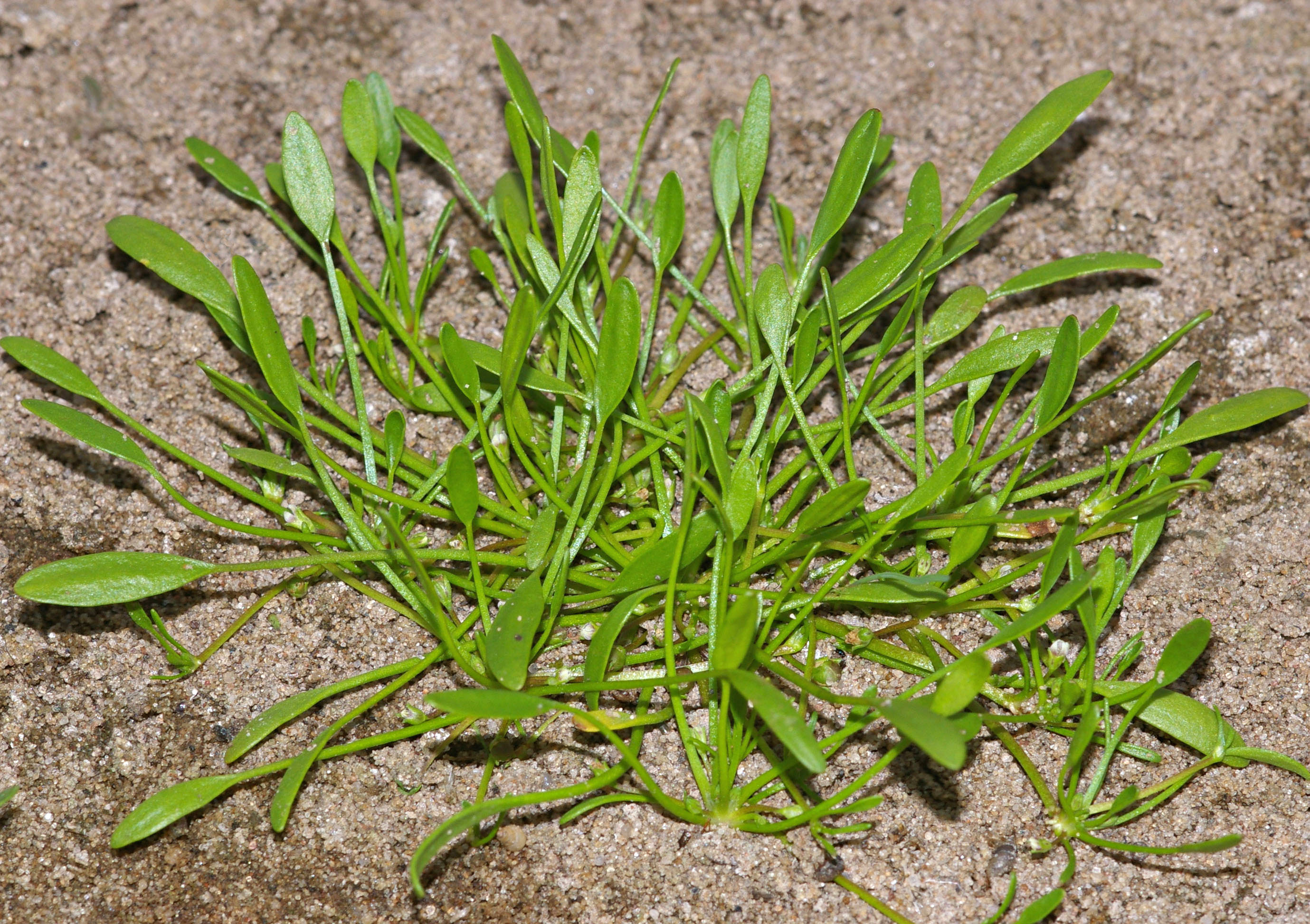
Habitus

Limosella aquatica is a widespread species of flowering plant in the figwort family known by the common name water mudwort. It is native to much of the temperate world, where it grows in many types of wet habitat. It is semiaquatic, growing in moist land habitat such as meadows, in mud and wet sand next to water, and partly submersed or floating in the water. It is a fleshy annual herb forming low tufts in muddy substrate. The leaf is made up of a petiole up to 30 centimetres (12 in) long but usually quite a bit shorter, tipped with a flat spoon-shaped blade up to 3 cm (1.2 in) long. The inflorescence is an erect stalk bearing one tiny white to pink- or blue-tinted flower about 2 millimetres (0.08 in) wide. The fruit is a capsule up to 5 mm (0.20 in) wide containing many tiny seeds.

== Taxonomy ==
Limosella aquatica was given its scientific name in 1753 by Carl Linnaeus. It is part of the genus Limosella which is classified in the Scrophulariaceae family. It has two accepted varieties.

- Limosella aquatica var. alismoides – Native to Angola
- Limosella aquatica var. aquatica – Widespread in the Northern Hemisphere and in Ecuador and Peru in South America

It has 17 synonyms, one of the species and 16 of variety aquatica.

Table of Synonyms
Name	Year	Rank	Synonym of:	Notes
Danubiunculus acaulis Sailer	1849	species	var. aquatica	= het.
Limosella americana f. submersa Glück	1934	form	var. aquatica	= het.
Limosella aquatica var. biflora Wahlenb.	1812	variety	var. aquatica	= het.
Limosella aquatica var. diandra Hartm.	1820	variety	var. aquatica	= het.
Limosella aquatica var. minor Hartm.	1832	variety	var. aquatica	= het., nom. superfl.
Limosella aquatica var. tenuifolia (Wolf ex Hoffm.) Mérat	1812	variety	var. aquatica	= het.
Limosella aquatica var. vulgaris Hartm.	1820	variety	var. aquatica	= het.
Limosella aquatica var. vulgaris Hartm.	1820	variety	var. aquatica	= het.
Limosella borealis Less. ex Ledeb.	1847	species	var. aquatica	= het.
Limosella diandra Krock.	1790	species	var. aquatica	= het., nom. illeg., homonym
Limosella natans Spreng. ex Drège	1847	species	var. aquatica	= het., nom. nud.
Limosella palustris L.	1771	species	var. aquatica	= het.
Limosella plantaginis-folia Gilib.	1782	species	var. aquatica	= het., opus utique oppr.
Limosella pubiflora Pennell	1940	species	var. aquatica	= het.
Limosella tenuifolia Wolf ex Hoffm.	1804	species	var. aquatica	= het.
Mutafinia silesiaca Raf.	1838	species	var. aquatica	= het.
Plantaginella aquatica (L.) Moench	1794	species	L. aquatica	≡ hom.
Notes: ≡ homotypic synonym; = heterotypic synonym
