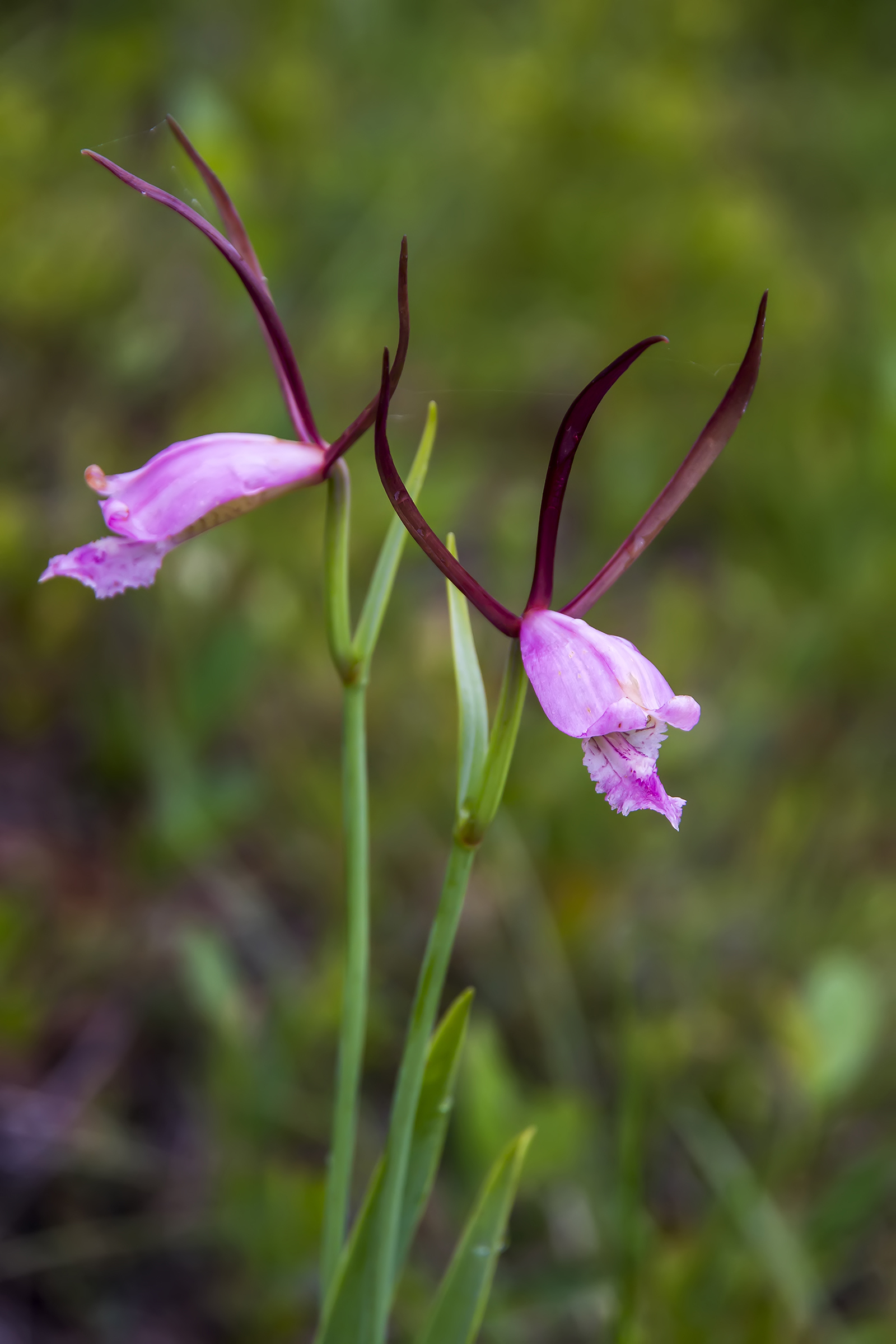
- Cleistesiopsis divaricata from North Carolina

Scientific classification
- Kingdom: Plantae
- Clade: Tracheophytes
- Clade: Angiosperms
- Clade: Monocots
- Order: Asparagales
- Family: Orchidaceae
- Subfamily: Vanilloideae
- Tribe: Pogonieae
- Genus: Cleistesiopsis; Pansarin & F.Barros

Type species
- Cleistesiopsis divaricata (L.) Pansarin & F.Barros

= Cleistesiopsis =

Genus of orchids

Cleistesiopsis is an orchid genus in the tribe Pogonieae. Its members were included in Cleistes until 2009. Cleistesiopsis is native to the eastern and southeastern United States from New Jersey south to Florida, and west to Kentucky and Louisiana. The common names are rosebud orchid and small spreading pogonia.

Cleistesiopsis is a terrestrial orchid with an underground network of spreading fibrous roots. It is found in small clusters of single flowering stems, each with a single leaf blade about halfway up the 30 – 45 cm stem. A smaller floral bract clasps around the base of the flower and appears as a second smaller leaf blade. The flower has three brown-green sepals spreading upward from the stem. Two upper petals and a lip below form the flower tube.

Cleistesiopsis flowers in the spring (April to May) along coastal plain area and around July in the mountains. It prefers savannas, meadows, openings woodlands, where the soil is acidic and moist and made up of rotting pine or other organic material, such as a boggy pine woodland. In the mountains that habitat may be xeric.

The plants are commonly up to 30 to 45 centimeters in height. The flowers are 2–3 cm across, depending on species.

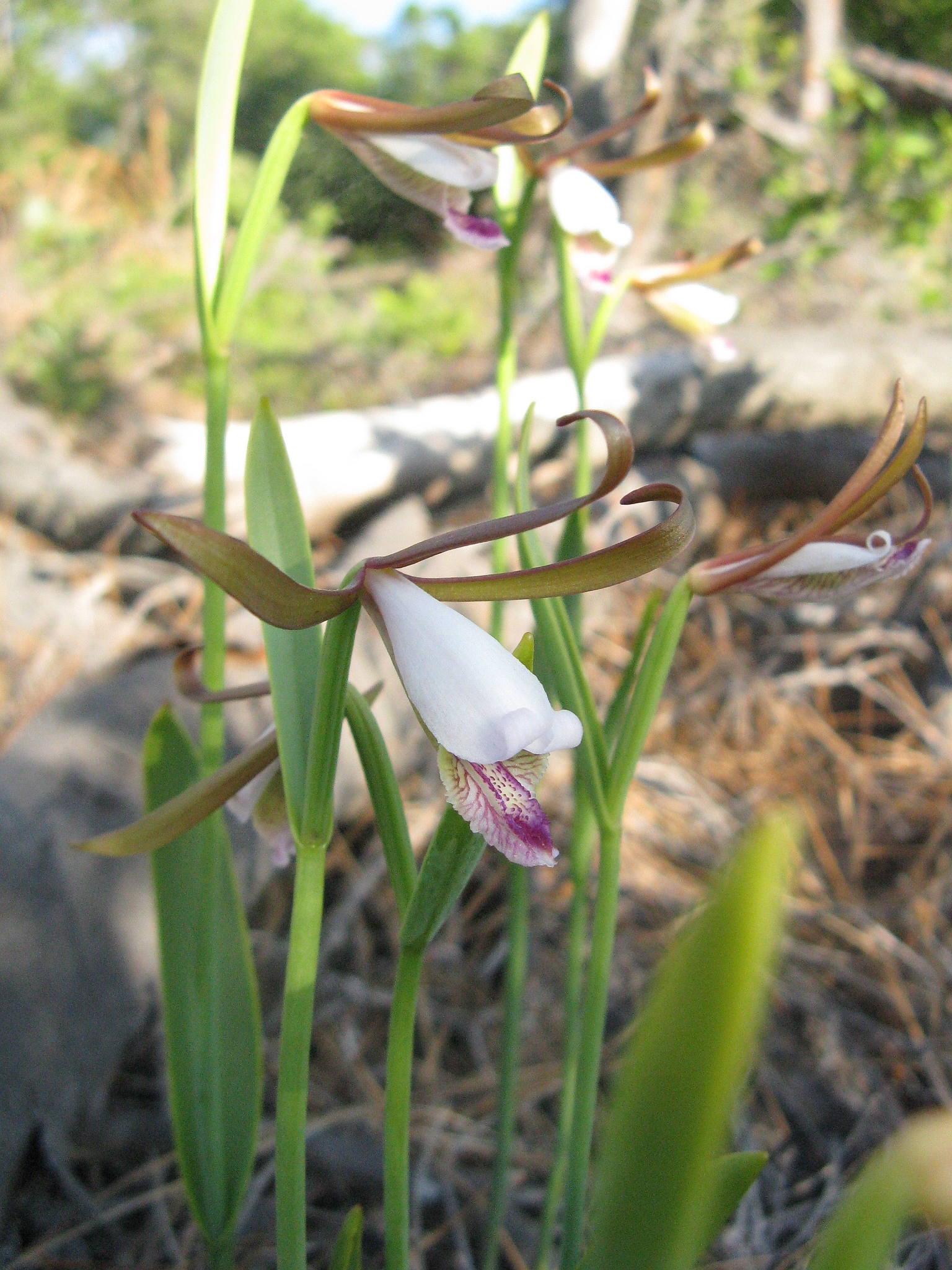
Cleistes divaricata in Carrabelle

== Species ==
Three species are recognized as of March 2023:

Image	Name	Distribution
	Cleistesiopsis bifaria (Fernald) Pansarin & F.Barros	Virginia to Florida, west to Kentucky and Louisiana
	Cleistesiopsis divaricata (L.) Pansarin & F.Barros	New Jersey to Florida
	Cleistesiopsis oricamporum P.M.Br.	from Louisiana to North Carolina
