= Eriocaulon sivarajanii =

Conservation status
- Critically Endangered (IUCN 3.1)

Scientific classification
- Kingdom: Plantae
- Clade: Tracheophytes
- Clade: Angiosperms
- Clade: Monocots
- Clade: Commelinids
- Order: Poales
- Family: Eriocaulaceae
- Genus: Eriocaulon
- Species: E. sivarajanii

Binomial name
- Eriocaulon sivarajanii R.Ansari & N.P.Balakr.

Species of flowering plant

Eriocaulon sivarajanii is a critically endangered monocotyledonous plant endemic to Kozhikode in the state of Kerala, India.
