= Eriocaulon ratnagiricum =

Conservation status
- Critically Endangered (IUCN 3.1)

Scientific classification
- Kingdom: Plantae
- Clade: Tracheophytes
- Clade: Angiosperms
- Clade: Monocots
- Clade: Commelinids
- Order: Poales
- Family: Eriocaulaceae
- Genus: Eriocaulon
- Species: E. ratnagiricum

Binomial name
- Eriocaulon ratnagiricum S.R.Yadav, S.P.Gaikwad & Sardesai

Species of flowering plant

Eriocaulon ratnagiricum is a critically endangered monocotyledonous plant only recorded near Ratnagiri in the state of Maharashtra, India. It is a small annual which grows on the edges of temporary pools on lateritic plateaus.
