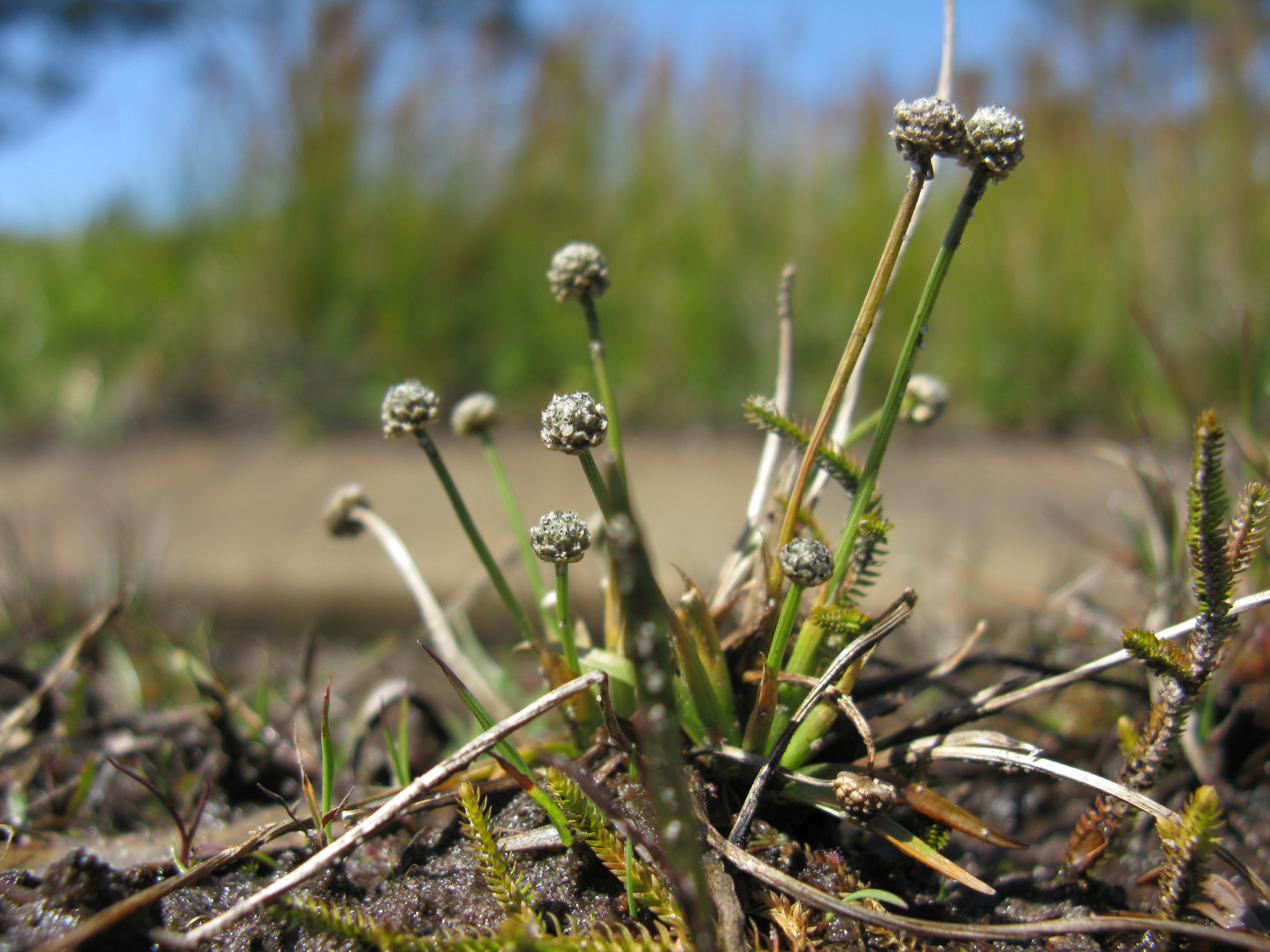
- Habit – Harry Rose, 12 Sept. 2009
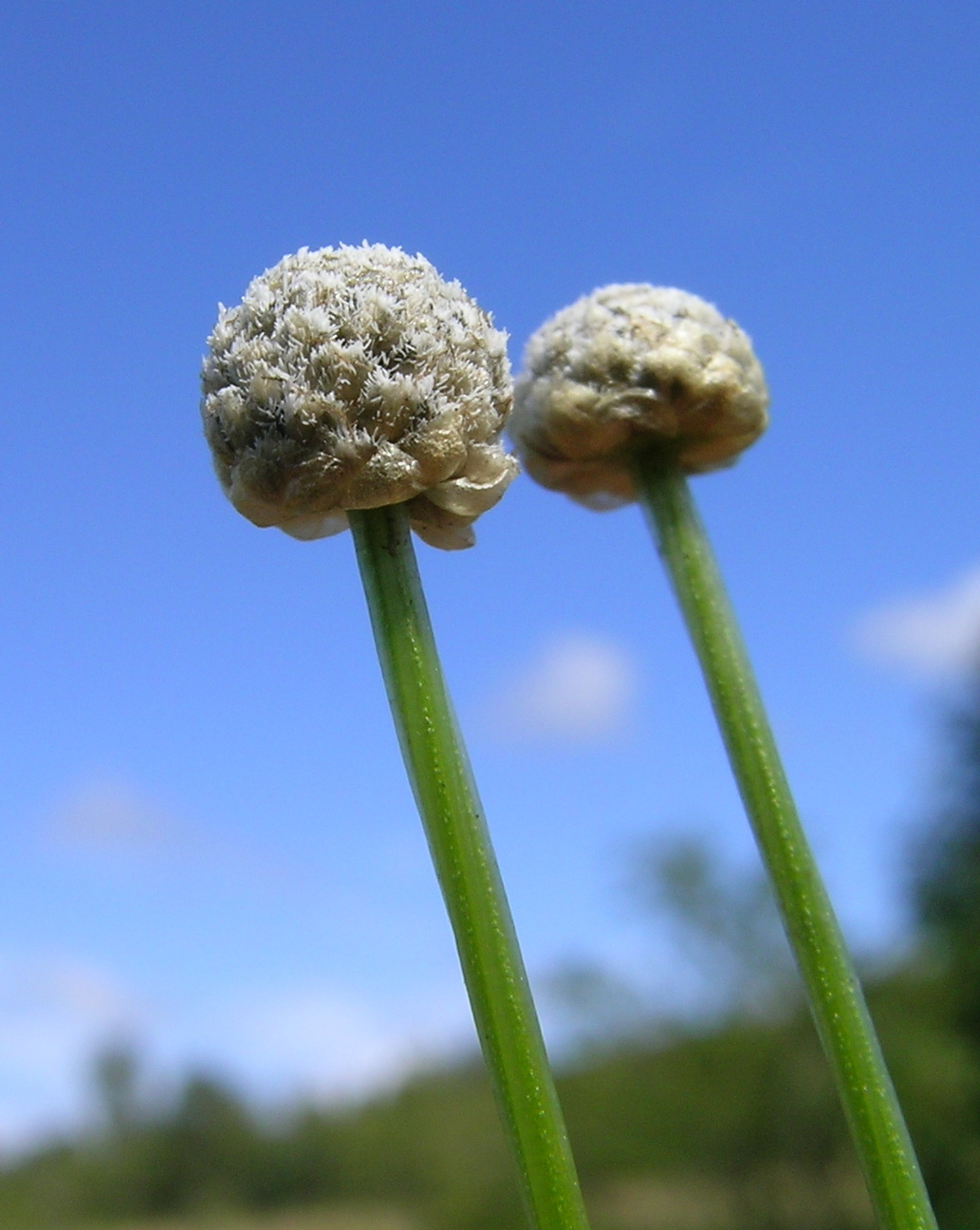
- Inflorescences – Harry Rose 18 Mar 2008

Conservation status
- Least Concern (NCA)

Scientific classification
- Kingdom: Plantae
- Clade: Tracheophytes
- Clade: Angiosperms
- Clade: Monocots
- Clade: Commelinids
- Order: Poales
- Family: Eriocaulaceae
- Genus: Eriocaulon
- Species: E. scariosum

Binomial name
- Eriocaulon scariosum Sm.

Synonyms
- Busseuillia novae-hollandiae R.Lesson (1837); Eriocaulon lhotskyi Steud. (1855); Eriocaulon smithii R.Br. (1810)

= Eriocaulon scariosum =

Species of flowering plant

Eriocaulon scariosum, commonly named common, rough or pale pipewort, is a species of tufted grass-like herbaceous plants, constituting part of the plant family Eriocaulaceae. The scientific name of Eriocaulon is derived from Ancient Greek ἔριον, erion, which means 'wool', and καυλός, caulos, which means 'stalk'. Common pipewort plants grow naturally in wetlands, bogs and drainage areas, from central and eastern Victoria, through eastern New South Wales, including the Australian Capital Territory, to eastern and north Queensland, Australia.

This species has obtained listing as "rare in Victoria" in the Victorian Department of Sustainability and Environment's current Advisory List of Rare or Threatened Plants in Victoria – 2005.

Based on specimen information "communicated from New South Wales in 1792, by John White, M. D.", this species was formally described using this name and in 1819 that was published scientifically by James E. Smith, London, in The Cyclopaedia.

== Description ==
Eriocaulon scariosum is an aquatic monocot in the Eriocaulaceae plant family.

Eriocaulon scariosum is found across Victoria, New South Wales, Queensland and the Northern Territory. It is a small plant with small, thin and flat leaves and a thin, long stem. The plant has terminal buds, tiny flowers that bunched are together in a ball-like shape and at the flower base, there are fringed bracts.

During the flowering period from January to June (NSW), the leaves of Eriocaulon scariosum can range from 15 to 80 mm long and 1.5–2 mm wide and the bracts have an inner surface glabrous that are concave and scarious. The outer surface glabrous; have inner bracts obovate to spathulate, greyish and concave. The outer surface of the plant has short white hairs on the distal abaxial surface.

The flower heads of the plant species are 3–6 mm long, 3.5–5.5 mm wide. Eriocaulon produces new leaves outwards from the central crown. The involucral bracts are straw-yellow and are an egg-shaped leaf and come in elliptic to broadly elliptic forms. The involucral bracts are 1.75–2 mm long and 0.9–1.5 mm wide, they are obtuse and at maturity they are reflexed. Floral bracts have either a translucent to black appearance of a translucent base, they are 1.5–2.5 mm long, 0.6–1.1 mm wide. At the apex of the plant, there are white hairs that are thinly distributed.

There is a mixture of male and female flowers of Eriocaulon scariosum in the environment, or it will be either predominantly male or predominantly female. Male flowers stipitate with 3 outer tepals and one tepal linear. Female flowers are with 2 or 3 irregular outer tepals, one tepal absent or linear, others oblong-spathulate, dark brown to black; inner tepals 3, narrow-oblong to spathulate, white and short hair on the surfaces.

The key features of Eriocaulon scariosum that are stated and used by biologists in order to differentiate this species of Eriocaulon from other species in Australia are that its seed epidermal cells have nearly equal diameters. The epidermal cells of the seed are approximately isodiametric. The seeds of Eriocaulon scariosum are 0.4–0.53 mm long and 0.3–0.38 mm wide and it has projections that resemble a peg on longitudinal and transverse walls. A key feature of this species is that the flowerhead has an outline that is level and smooth. It has involucral bracts situated below or close to the flowers; male sepals are formed into a spathe which are terminal; whilst female sepals are dimorphic with two different forms of laterals.

== Habitat and distribution ==
Eriocaulon scariosum is native to Australia and its occurrence is rare in Victoria as stated in The Royal Botanic Gardens Victoria. It is categorised as “rare” in Victoria's in the Advisory list of rare or threatened plants in Victoria – 2014 maintained by the Victoria Department of Environment and Primary Industries (DEPI). This Advisory List is constructed from technical and scientific information and knowledge from a variety of botanic experts.

The conservation status of Eriocaulon scariosum is deemed as to not be under threat and widespread across Australia. It is not classified in the Federal Environment Protection Biodiversity Conservation Act 1999 (EPBC Act). The plant's distribution is commonly spread in eastern and central Victoria, New South Wales, Queensland and Northern Territory. Eriocaulon scariosum grows in wet areas such as wetlands, bogs, melaleuca swamps and lakes and springs, drainage areas and soils that contain sand. In the damp areas, Eriocaulon scariosum is often overlooked and inconspicuous as it is difficult to find due to its small size.

The Castlereagh Swamp Woodland Community, an endangered ecological community, facilitates habitat for several plant species that are described as of regional importance, according to the Urban Bushland Biodiversity Survey, NPWS (1997). These include Eriocaulon scariosum.

Eriocaulon Scariosum is a part of a related Queensland complex of Eriocaulon species, which includes Eriocaulon odontospermum and as well as Eriocaulon annum. Eriocaulon scariosum is reported at three Fraser Coast localities, Tuan Forest, Talegalla Weir and Fraser Island. It is recorded in the Wilde Bay district in the Queensland Herbarium Censis and is classified as Least Concern by the Queensland Nature Conservation Act.

Bioregion	Occurrence status	Establishment means
Victorian Riverina	present	native
Gippsland Plain	present	native
Goldfields	present	native
Central Victorian Uplands	present	native
Northern Inland Slopes	present	native
East Gippsland Lowlands	present	native
Highlands-Southern Fall	present	native
Highlands-Northern Fall	present	native
Victorian Alps	present	native
Snowy Mountains	present	native

== Taxonomy ==
=== Taxonomic history ===
In the past, the only treatment and taxonomy of Eriocaulon in Australia were from the nineteenth century. Leach (2000) listed nine new species that are endemic to northern Australia.

This species was described with the name Eriocaulon scariosum, and it was published scientifically in The Cyclopedia by James E. Smith located in London.

There are regional floral treatments and publications on Eriocaulon that facilitate information on the Australian genus. The seed coat morphology can facilitate a set of characteristics that are useful in the diagnosis and identification of species and data on the relationships of the species.

Most species of Eriocaulon has a consistent seed coat pattern, as verified by research on the Australian species. Seed coat pattern can be observed through a microscope, dissecting it. The ontogenetic development of the floral features in the plant has been referenced by Phiiplis (1994) and Giulietti et al. (1987).

What is key to the taxonomy of Eriocaulon taking place on mound springs in Australia is that the seed of the Eriocaulon is with papillae and is displayed in a reticulate pattern. The plant has large female sepals, oblong spatulate leaves. and has no thick or heavy dorsal keels. This appearance is on mound springs in the Taroom district and present in different habitats.

=== Representative herbarium specimens ===
Queensland: 38 km south of Yuleba, 9 November 1958, R.W. Johnson 659 (BRI); Teewah, Lake Cootharaba, 25 July 1976, I.R. Telford 4315 (BRI, CBG, DNA); Spring Creek Station, 1 February 1995, B. Wilson s.n. (DNA).

New South Wales: Wollar to Ulan road, January, 1964, E.F. Constable s.n. (NSW64031); East Lakes, 17 August 1993, R.G. Coveny 11765 (BRI, DNA, NSW); Horse Swamp, Barrington Tops Plateau, 23 April 1994, P.G. Kodela 296 (CANB, DNA, MEL, NE, NSW).

Australian Capital Territotu: Smokers Flat, 13 March 1986, M. Gray 7117 (CANB, DNA, NSW).

Vitoria: Kiewa Valley, Mount Beauty, 30 November 1987, R. Bates 12932 (AD); NE of Perry River bridge, 18 km ESE of Stratford, 6 May 1985, A.C. Beauglehole 79587 (CANB); Beechworth township, 25 June 1950, E.J. McBarron herb. no. 4668 (MEL, NSW).

== Ecology ==
The flowering period of Eriocaulon scariosum is from January through June each year.

The Eriocaulaceae family grows the best in the Western Hemisphere, more specifically the ‘New World tropics’. The centres of diversity of Eriocaulon include Africa, the Indian subcontinent and South America.

The species in the genus is mainly made up of small perennial herbs and are situated in shallow water or damp habitats. In Eriocaulon plants, the nectar glands on the apices of petals make fluid that acts on attracting insects, which leads to insect pollination.

Within wet habitats, the abundance of Eriocaulon scariosum is determined by the occurrence of fire, water levels and other contesting plants such as grasses. Experiments found that the plant is weak in survival in comparison to other wetland plant species.

The Eriocaulon species has become a more recurrent plant because their threats and requirements to grow has been studied and more understood. In order for the plants to grow better and more easily, the substrate levels for the environment needs to be soft water with substantiating CO_{2}. They can do extremely better with higher CO_{2} levels and light. Two signs that the plant is not growing well are if the plant has a weak root arrangement and older leaves growing old at a faster rate.

If the plant has stiff instead of soft leaves and the formations of the leaves are neat and not messy or indented, it means the plant is strong.

As they grow bigger, many species of Eriocaulon can naturally produce offshoots. Sometimes, offshoots are created when the plant goes through a period of either instability or stress, for example when the plant is relocated or experiences a change in growth conditions. When multiple offshoots are grown at the same time, it then results in the deterioration of the cluster.

== Gallery ==
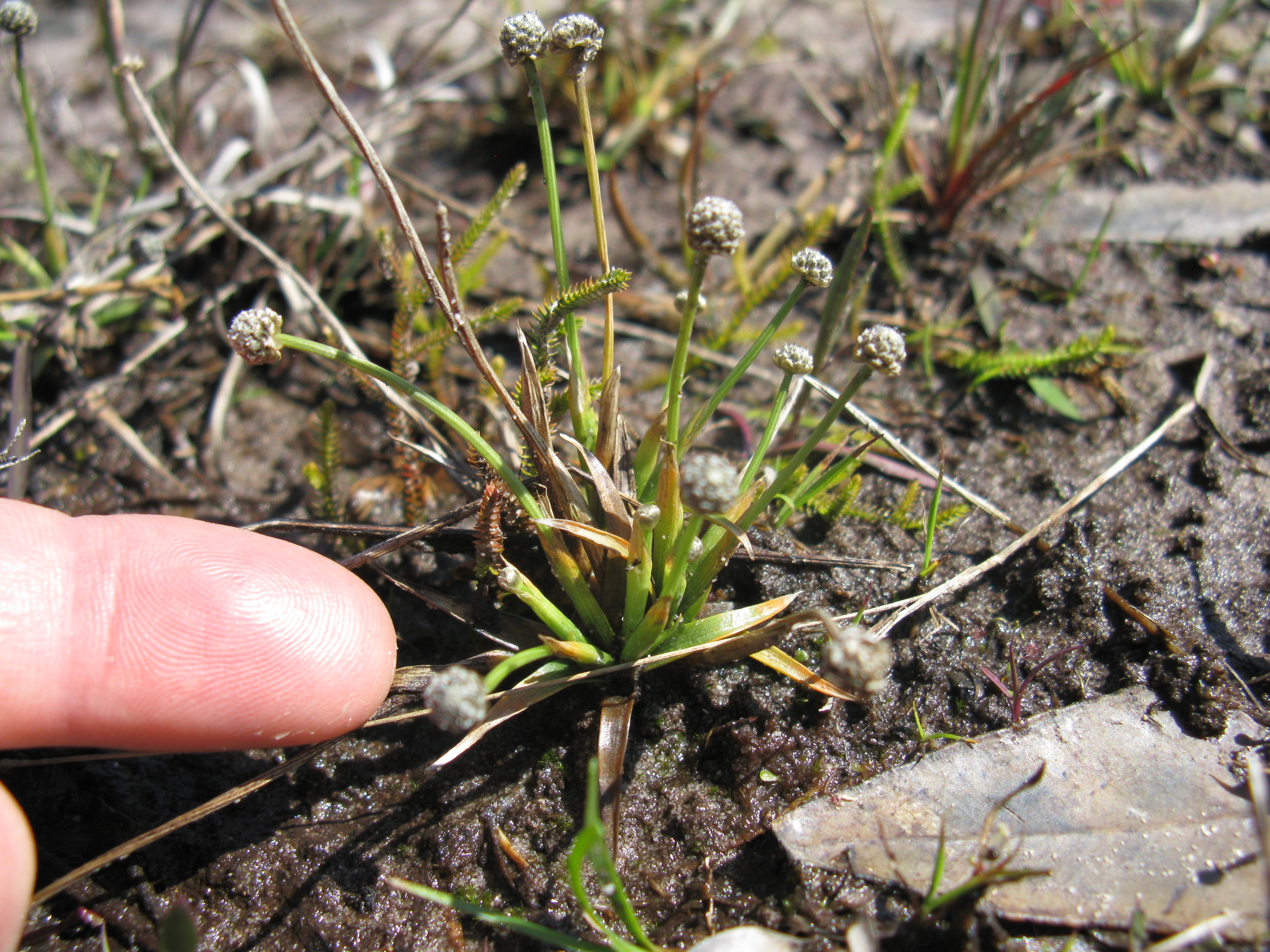

Harry Rose, 12 Sept 2009

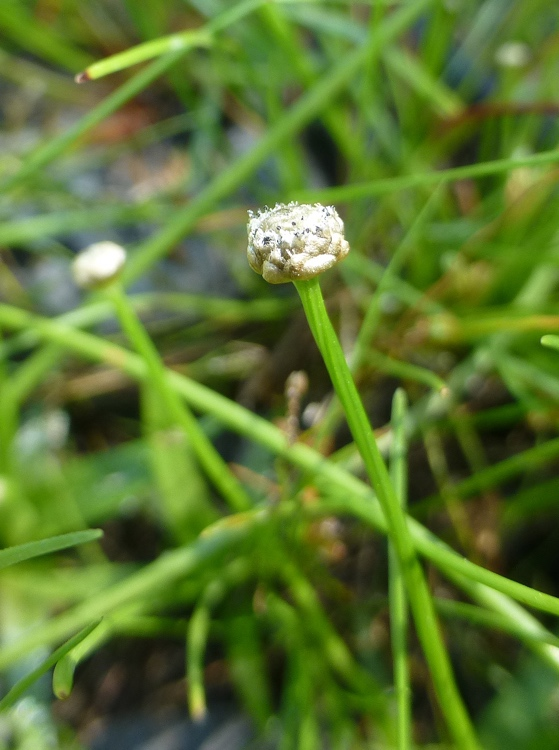
Purdie, R.W. - Eriocaulon Scariosum. 31 May 2018.
