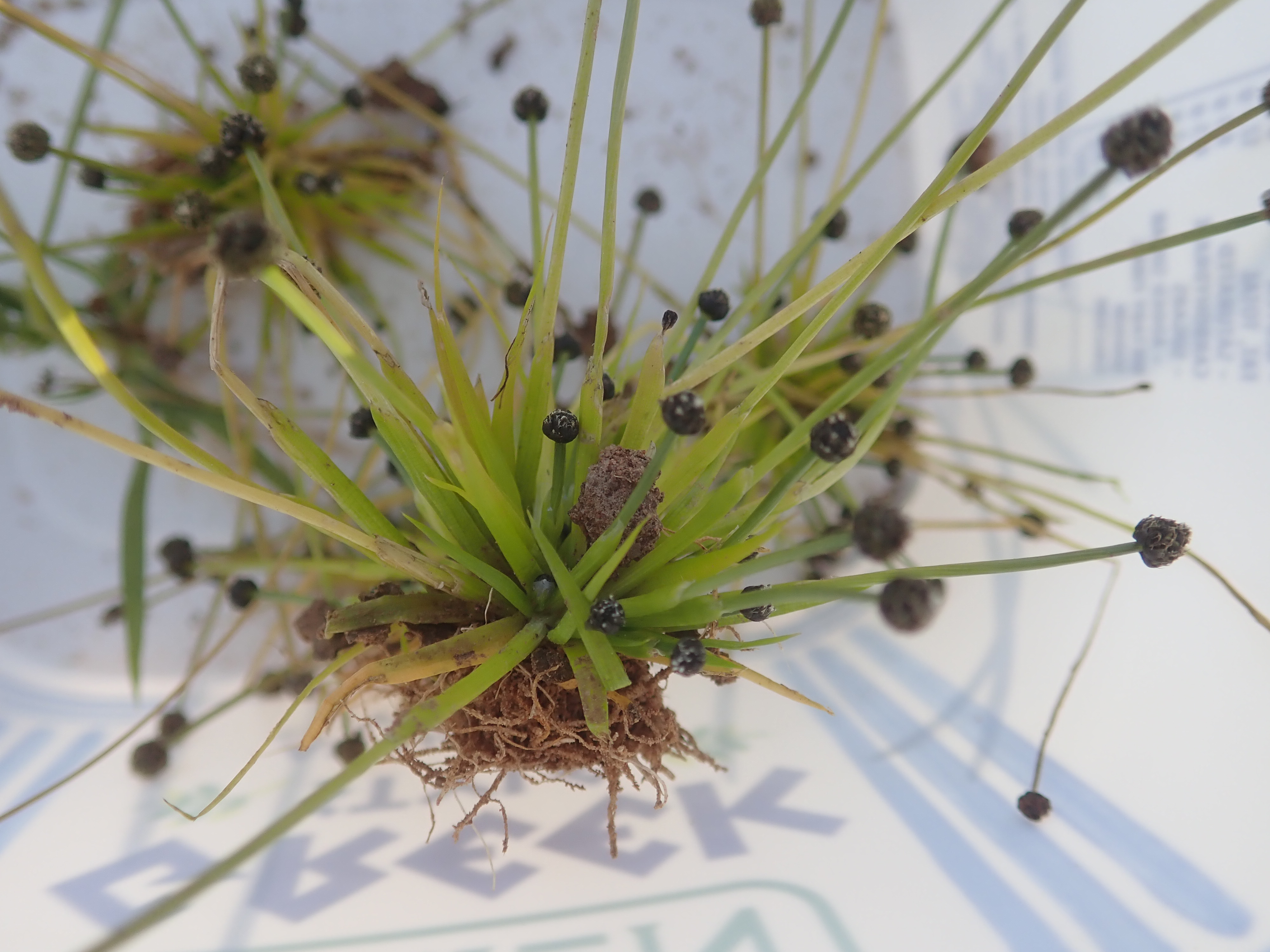

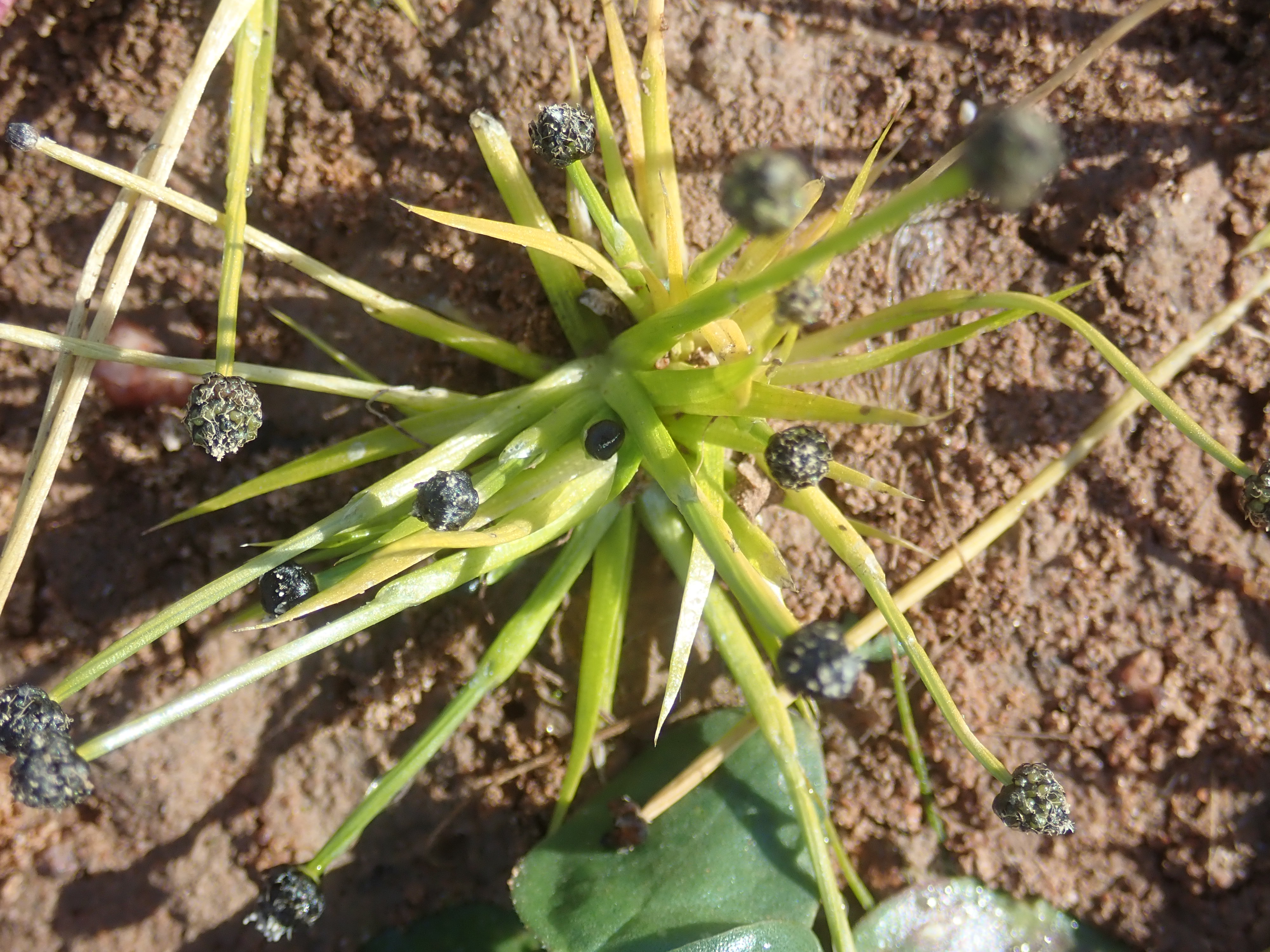

Conservation status
- Endangered (IUCN 3.1)

- Endangered (EPBC Act)

Scientific classification
- Kingdom: Plantae
- Clade: Embryophytes
- Clade: Tracheophytes
- Clade: Spermatophytes
- Clade: Angiosperms
- Clade: Monocots
- Clade: Commelinids
- Order: Poales
- Family: Eriocaulaceae
- Genus: Eriocaulon
- Species: E. australasicum

Binomial name
- Eriocaulon australasicum (F.Muell.) Körn.

Synonyms
- Electrosperma australasicum F.Muell. Eriocaulon electrospermum F.Muell.

= Eriocaulon australasicum =

Species of flowering plant

Eriocaulon australasicum (common names southern pipewort, austral pipewort) is an endangered monocotyledonous plant in the Eriocaulaceae family found in Australia, in Victoria, South Australia and New South Wales.

== Description ==
Eriocaulon australasicum is a small, annual, semi-aquatic herb with a tuft of basal linear leaves which are 20–50 mm long by 1–1.5 mm wide. The flowers occur as egg-shaped to almost globular heads 3–4 mm wide. These are enclosed in lance-shaped outer bracts and by linear inner bracts. The fruits are smooth, with three celled capsules, which each contain a single seed. It possibly requires an inundation period to enable germination from soil-stored seed. Plants start to grow in shallow water (up to 20 cm deep), particularly when the water is clear and the substrate has high organic content. Flowering and seed-set swiftly follow falling water levels and the drying-out of depressions. Little is known about seed set, seed bank accumulation and its persistence and viability. It does not appear to reproduce vegetatively.

== Habitat ==
It grows in shallow, seasonally-inundated, depressions and on the margins of swamps on clay plains.

== Taxonomy ==
It was first described as Electrosperma australasicum by Ferdinand von Mueller in 1854, who found it "on wet places along the Murray, towards the junction of the Murrumbidgee". It was transferred to the genus, Eriocaulon, in 1854 by Friedrich August Körnicke.

== Threats and recovery plan ==
Threats to the species are climate change, since Eriocaulon australasicum occurs in seasonally wet habitats, and probably requires a period of inundation to enable stored seed to germinate. With climate change, less frequent inundation of the required habitats will reduce habitat availability. A further threat is the grazing and trampling by sheep of the population in South Australia and possibly grazing by rabbits in Victoria.

Current conservation actions in Victoria include the repair of boundary fencing to remove the grazing of the Little Desert population in Victoria, and the realignment of a vehicle track to eliminate the threat of vehicle disturbance. Additionally, fuel reduction programs in Victorian parks and reserves have been modified to avoid disturbance at sites where Eriocaulon australasicum occurs.
