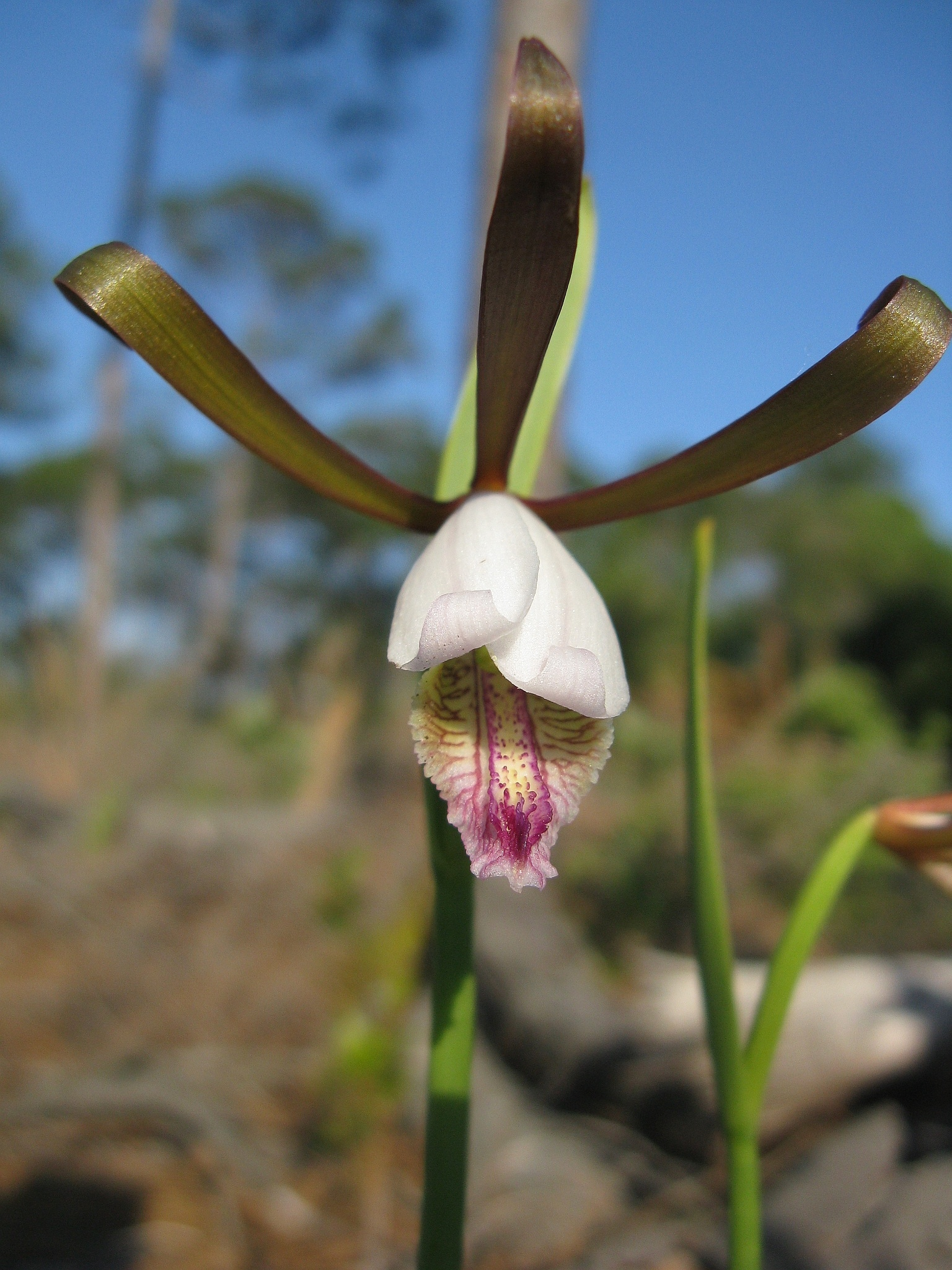
- Cleistesiopsis divaricata near Carrabelle, Florida

Scientific classification
- Kingdom: Plantae
- Clade: Tracheophytes
- Clade: Angiosperms
- Clade: Monocots
- Order: Asparagales
- Family: Orchidaceae
- Subfamily: Vanilloideae
- Genus: Cleistesiopsis
- Species: C. divaricata

Binomial name
- Cleistesiopsis divaricata (L.) Pansarin & F.Barros

Synonyms
- Arethusa divaricata L.; Pogonia divaricata (L.) R.Br. in W.T.Aiton; Cleistes divaricata (L.) Ames; Cleistes divaricata f. leucantha P.M.Br.; Cleistesiopsis divaricata f. leucantha (P.M.Br.) P.M.Br.

= Cleistesiopsis divaricata =

Species of orchid

Cleistesiopsis divaricata (commonly known as the rosebud orchid, small spreading pogonia, or the large dragonhead pogonia) is a terrestrial species of orchid native to the eastern United States from New Jersey to Florida.
