= Eriocaulon bolei =

Conservation status
- Critically Endangered (IUCN 3.1)

Scientific classification
- Kingdom: Plantae
- Clade: Tracheophytes
- Clade: Angiosperms
- Clade: Monocots
- Clade: Commelinids
- Order: Poales
- Family: Eriocaulaceae
- Genus: Eriocaulon
- Species: E. bolei

Binomial name
- Eriocaulon bolei Bole & M.R.Almeida

Species of flowering plant

Eriocaulon bolei is a critically endangered monocotyledonous plant only recorded in Satara district in the state of Maharashtra, India. It is a herb which grows up to 10–20 cm in height and seen in running water.
