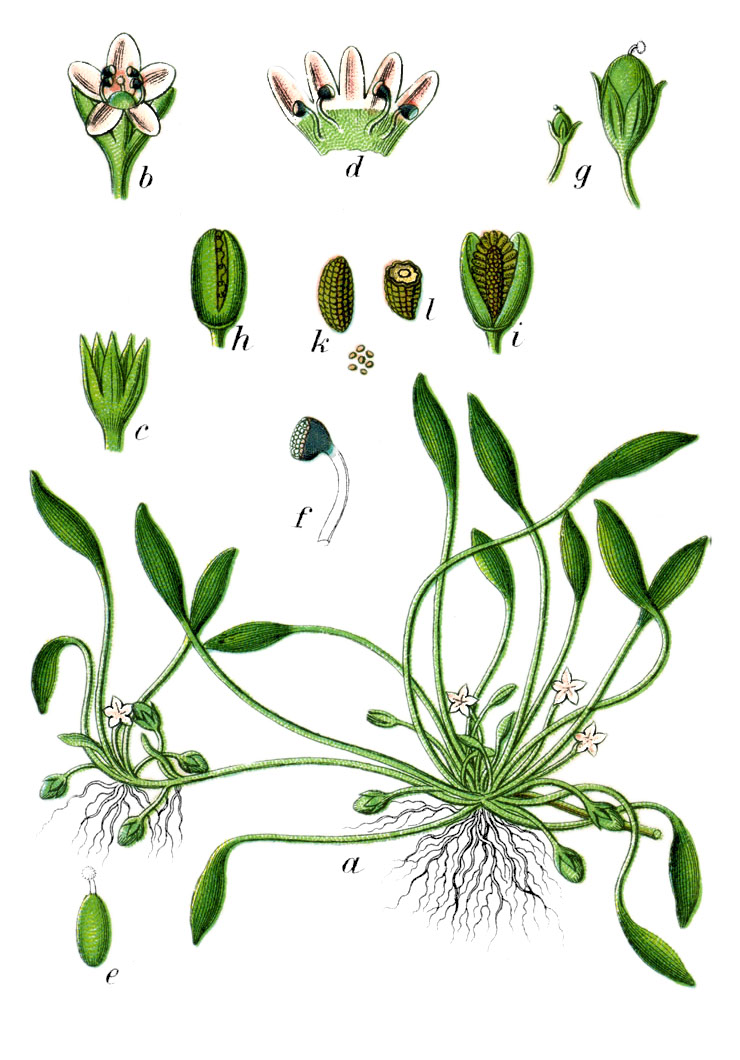
- 1796 botanical illustration.

Scientific classification
- Kingdom: Plantae
- Clade: Tracheophytes
- Clade: Angiosperms
- Clade: Eudicots
- Clade: Asterids
- Order: Lamiales
- Family: Scrophulariaceae
- Genus: Limosella
- Species: L. australis

Binomial name
- Limosella australis R.Br.

Synonyms
- Limosella aquatica, Limosella subulata

= Limosella australis =

Species of flowering plant

Limosella australis, common name Welsh mudwort, is an annual dicot plant that is indigenous to the United States and Canada. It has white flowers, and blooms between July and October. Its habitat is tidal mudflats, muddy or sandy shores It is listed as a special concern species in Connecticut.
