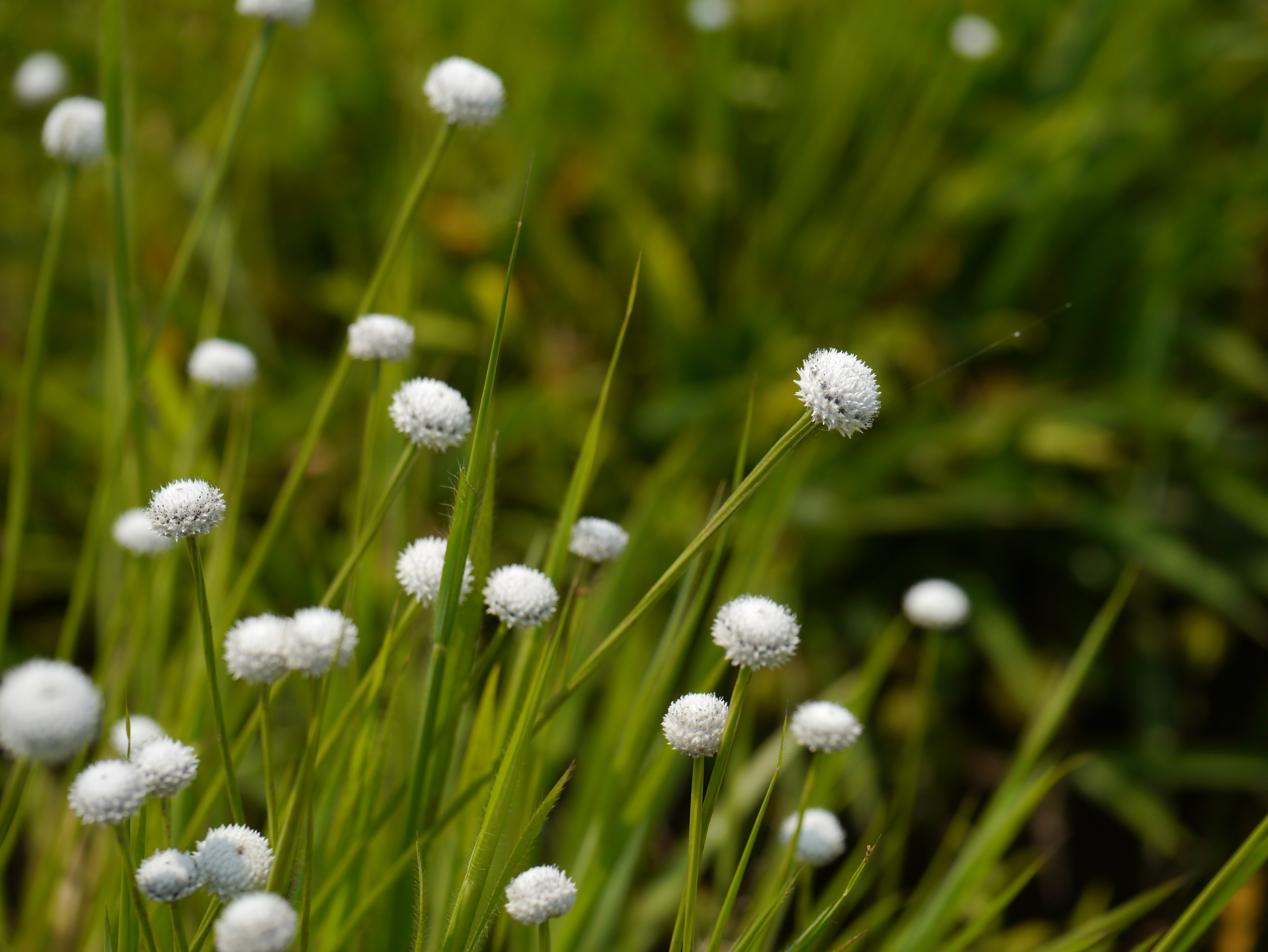

Conservation status
- Critically Endangered (IUCN 3.1)

Scientific classification
- Kingdom: Plantae
- Clade: Tracheophytes
- Clade: Angiosperms
- Clade: Monocots
- Clade: Commelinids
- Order: Poales
- Family: Eriocaulaceae
- Genus: Eriocaulon
- Species: E. sharmae

Binomial name
- Eriocaulon sharmae R.Ansari & N.P.Balakr.

= Eriocaulon sharmae =

Species of flowering plant

Eriocaulon sharmae is a critically endangered monocotyledonous plant endemic to Amboli and Sindhudurg in the state of Maharashtra, India.
