= Limosella acaulis =

Conservation status
- Least Concern (IUCN 3.1)

Scientific classification
- Kingdom: Plantae
- Clade: Embryophytes
- Clade: Tracheophytes
- Clade: Angiosperms
- Clade: Eudicots
- Clade: Asterids
- Order: Lamiales
- Family: Scrophulariaceae
- Genus: Limosella
- Species: L. acaulis

Binomial name
- Limosella acaulis Sessé & Moc.

Species of plant

Limosella acaulis is a species of flowering plant in the figwort family known by the common name Owyhee mudwort. It is native to western North America from the Pacific Northwest to northern Mexico, where it grows in many types of muddy habitat next to water, such as pond edges. It is a fleshy annual herb forming low mats in muddy substrate. The flattened leaves are linear to strap-shaped to spoon-shaped and up to 6 centimeters long. The inflorescence is an erect stalk bearing one white to pale lavender flower just a few millimeters wide. The fruit is a capsule up to 5 millimeters wide containing many tiny seeds.
