= Eriocaulon nigrobracteatum =

Black-bracted pipewort

Scientific classification
- Kingdom: Plantae
- Clade: Tracheophytes
- Clade: Angiosperms
- Clade: Monocots
- Clade: Commelinids
- Order: Poales
- Family: Eriocaulaceae
- Genus: Eriocaulon
- Species: E. nigrobracteatum

Binomial name
- Eriocaulon nigrobracteatum E.L.Bridges & Orzell

Species of flowering plant

Eriocaulon nigrobracteatum, commonly known as the black-bract pipewort or dark-headed hatpins, is a species of flowering plant in the pipewort family Eriocaulaceae. It is endemic to the Florida Panhandle in the southeastern United States and is associated with wetland seepage habitats.

== Description ==
This species is a perennial herb forming small rosettes of narrow, basal leaves. Flowering stems (scapes) are slender and four-angled, bearing compact capitula. Flower heads are white above owing to numerous hairs and dark gray or black below due to the dark involucral bracts. The basal sheath of the scape is notably longer than the longest leaves.

== Taxonomy ==
E. nigrobracteatum was first described by botanists Steve L. Orzell of the Florida Natural Areas Inventory and Edwin L. Bridges of the Florida Department of Environmental Regulation in 1993 in the journal Phytologia. The specific epithet nigrobracteatum refers to its dark-colored involucral bracts.

== Distribution and habitat ==
Eriocaulon nigrobracteatum is endemic to the Florida Panhandle, where it occurs in seepage meadows, mucky bogs, and poor fen habitats with saturated soils and sparse herbaceous cover in Bay, Calhoun, and Gulf counties. It is part of wetland plant communities characteristic of Coastal Plain seepage bogs. Seepage meadow vegetation containing this species is classified in the U.S. National Vegetation Classification system.

== Ecology ==
This species occupies nutrient-poor, water-saturated substrates and is associated with herbaceous wetland flora, including other sedges and Eriocaulon species. Its life cycle and reproductive timing are adapted to seasonal wetness and hydrological fluctuation.

== Conservation status ==
In Florida, E. nigrobracteatum is ranked G1/S1 (critically imperiled) due to its restricted range and specialized habitat, and is listed as endangered at the state level. Threats include hydrological alteration and habitat loss.
