= Eriocaulon koernickianum =

Scientific classification
- Kingdom: Plantae
- Clade: Tracheophytes
- Clade: Angiosperms
- Clade: Monocots
- Clade: Commelinids
- Order: Poales
- Family: Eriocaulaceae
- Genus: Eriocaulon
- Species: E. koernickianum

Binomial name
- Eriocaulon koernickianum Van Heurck & Muller-Argoviensis 1870

Synonyms
- Eriocaulon Kornickianum Van Heurck & Müll. Arg

Species of flowering plant

Eriocaulon koernickianum, common names dwarf pipewort or gulf pipewort, is a plant species native to Oklahoma, Arkansas, Georgia and Texas. It occurs in moist, sandy acidic soils in seeps and bogs.

Eriocaulon koernickianum is an herb up to 8 cm (3.2 inches) tall, reproducing sexually and also by means of lateral vegetative shoots. Leaves are narrow, up to 5 cm (2 inches) long. Flowers are clustered into a head at the top of a long flowering stalk. Heads are up to 4 mm in diameter, gray to olive, lacking the ciliate hairs common in many other species of the genus.
