= Eriocaulon longipetalum =

Scientific classification
- Kingdom: Plantae
- Clade: Tracheophytes
- Clade: Angiosperms
- Clade: Monocots
- Clade: Commelinids
- Order: Poales
- Family: Eriocaulaceae
- Genus: Eriocaulon
- Species: E. longipetalum

Binomial name
- Eriocaulon longipetalum Rendle

Species of plant

Eriocaulon longipetalum is a pipewort (family Eriocaulaceae) native to the environs of Benguela, Angola. It is the smallest pipewort presently known, being only 1 cm tall and wide; the smallest land-dwelling monocot. Its capitate inflorescence consists of about a dozen unisexual florets totaling 1.2 mm width. Its construction is gracile, and it may be the least massive of all land-dwelling flowering plants
