= Eriocaulon rouxianum =

Conservation status
- Critically Endangered (IUCN 3.1)

Scientific classification
- Kingdom: Plantae
- Clade: Tracheophytes
- Clade: Angiosperms
- Clade: Monocots
- Clade: Commelinids
- Order: Poales
- Family: Eriocaulaceae
- Genus: Eriocaulon
- Species: E. rouxianum

Binomial name
- Eriocaulon rouxianum Steud.

Species of flowering plant

Eriocaulon rouxianum is a critically endangered monocotyledonous plant endemic to Mumbai and Nashik in the state of Maharashtra, India. It has not been recorded since 1982.
