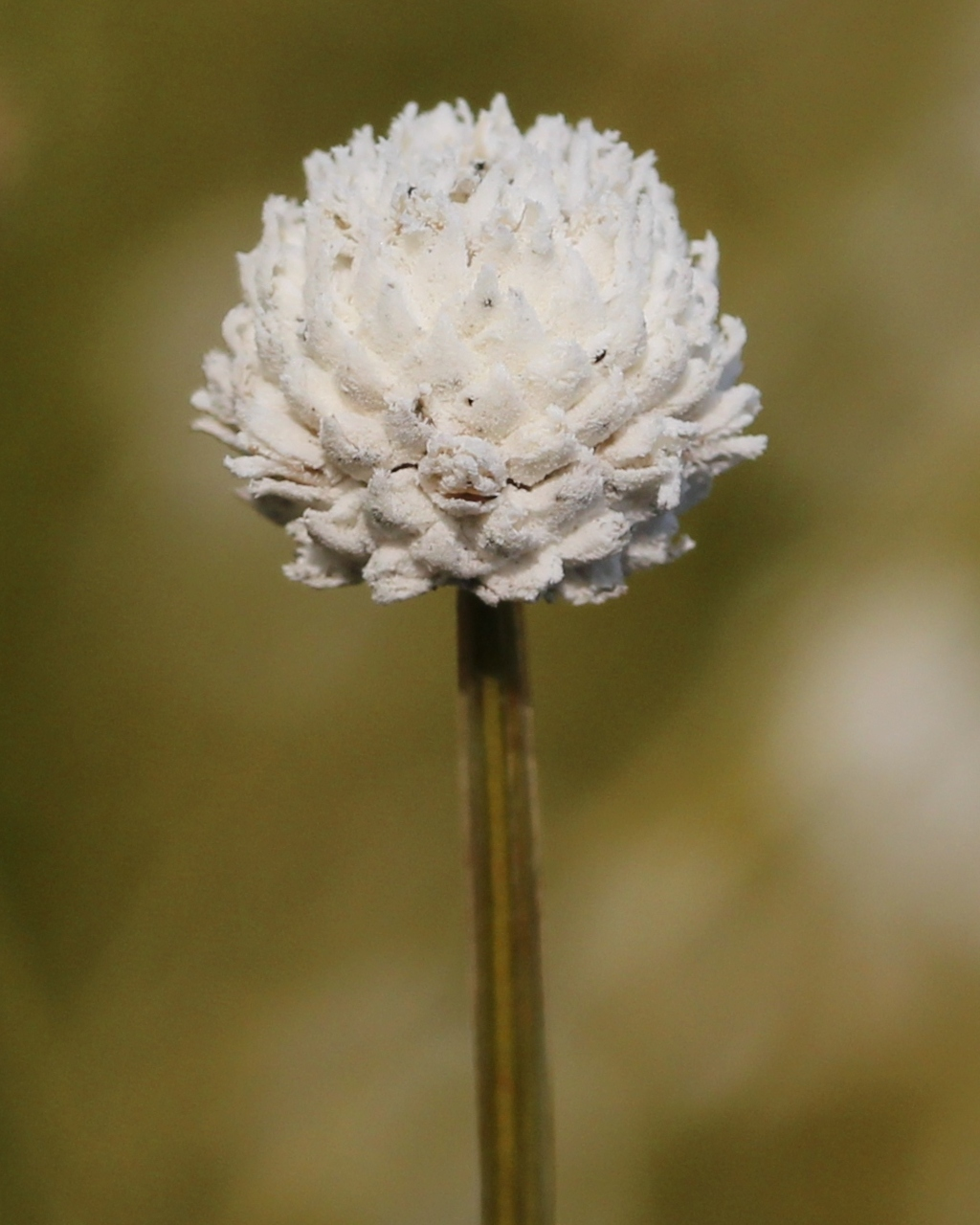
- Eriocaulon nudicuspe

Scientific classification
- Kingdom: Plantae
- Clade: Embryophytes
- Clade: Tracheophytes
- Clade: Spermatophytes
- Clade: Angiosperms
- Clade: Monocots
- Clade: Commelinids
- Order: Poales
- Family: Eriocaulaceae
- Genus: Eriocaulon; L.

Synonyms
- Busseuillia R.Lesson; Cespa Hill; Chaetodiscus Steud.; Dichrolepis Welw.; Electrosperma F.Muell.; Lasiolepis Boeckeler; Leucocephala Roxb.; Nasmythia Huds.; Randalia P.Beauv. ex Desv.; Sphaerochloa P.Beauv. ex Desv.; Symphachne P.Beauv. ex Desv.

= Eriocaulon =

Genus of flowering plants

Eriocaulon is a genus of nearly 500 species of monocotyledonous flowering plants in the family Eriocaulaceae, commonly known as pipeworts. Species of Eriocaulon have a wide distribution in the Americas, the British Isles, sub-Saharan Africa, central, east, south, and southeast Asia, Papuasia, Australia, and the Pacific.

== Etymology ==
The scientific name is derived from Ancient Greek ἔριον, erion, meaning 'wool', and καυλός, caulos, meaning 'stalk'.

== Description ==
The species are mostly herbaceous perennial plants, though some are annual plants; they resemble plants in the related families Cyperaceae (sedges) and Juncaceae (rushes), and like them, have rather small, wind-pollinated flowers.

== Distribution and habitat ==
The genus is widely distributed, with the centers of diversity for the group occurring in tropical regions, particularly southern Asia and the Americas. A few species extend to temperate regions, with approximately 10 species in the United States, mostly in the southern states from California to Florida, and only two species in Canada; China has 35 species, also mostly southern. Only one species (E. aquaticum) occurs in Europe, where it is confined to the Atlantic Ocean coasts of Scotland and Ireland; this species also occurs in eastern North America and is thought to be a relatively recent natural colonist in Europe. In the Americas, Eriocaulon is the only genus in its family that occurs north of Florida.

They tend to be associated with wet soils, many growing in shallow water, in wetlands, or in wet savannas like flatwoods. In wet soils, their abundance appears to be related to water levels, fire frequency, and competition from other plants such as grasses. Experiments have shown that they are weak competitors compared to many other wetland plant species. Some species can persist as buried seeds during unfavorable conditions.

== Selected species ==
As of May 2026, 496 species are accepted. The names below were sourced from official sources including: the Flora of North America, the Flora of China, currently accepted Australian taxa from the Australian Plant Name Index, etc..

- Eriocaulon achiton
- Eriocaulon acutibracteatum
- Eriocaulon aethiopicum
- Eriocaulon albocapitatum
- Eriocaulon aloefolium R.J.Davies – Qld, Australia
- Eriocaulon alpestre
- Eriocaulon angustulum
- Eriocaulon anshiense
- Eriocaulon apetalum
- Eriocaulon aquaticum (Hill) Druce – n. Europe & e. North America
- Eriocaulon asteroides
- Eriocaulon athertonense G.J.Leach – Qld, Australia
- Eriocaulon atrum
- Eriocaulon australasicum (F.Muell.) Korn. – SA, NSW, Vic, Australia
- Eriocaulon australe R.Br. – Cambodia, China, W Malaysia, Thailand, Vietnam, NT, Qld, NSW, Australia, Pacific Islands
- Eriocaulon balakrishnanii
- Eriocaulon bamendae
- Eriocaulon baramaticum
- Eriocaulon barbeyanum
- Eriocaulon benthamii
- Eriocaulon bifistulosum Van Heurck & Mull.Arg. – Qld, Australia
- Eriocaulon bolei
- Eriocaulon brevipedunculatum
- Eriocaulon breviscapum
- Eriocaulon brownianum
- Eriocaulon buergerianum
- Eriocaulon carpentariae G.J.Leach – NT, Qld, Australia
- Eriocaulon carsonii F.Muell. – SA, Qld, NSW, Australia
  - subsp. carsonii – SA, Qld, NSW, Australia
  - subsp. euloense R.J.Davies – Qld, Australia
  - subsp. orientale R.J.Davies – Qld, Australia
- Eriocaulon cauliferum Makino(1910) - Japan
- Eriocaulon chinorossicum
- Eriocaulon cinereum R.Br. – WA, NT, Qld, Australia
- Eriocaulon clarksonii G.J.Leach – Qld, Australia
- Eriocaulon compressum
- Eriocaulon concretum F.Muell. – WA, NT, Qld, Australia
- Eriocaulon conicum
- Eriocaulon cookei
- Eriocaulon cuspidatum
- Eriocaulon dalzellii

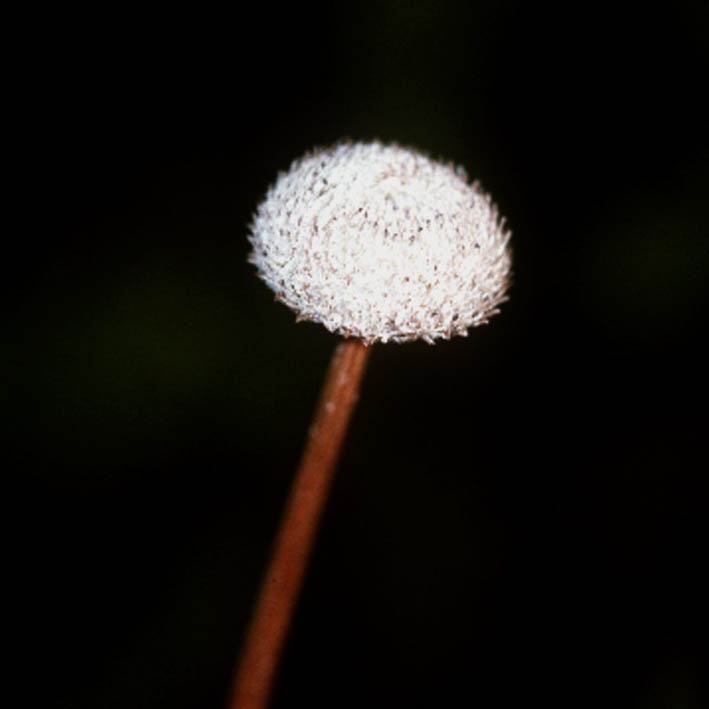
Eriocaulon decangulare

- Eriocaulon decangulare
- Eriocaulon decemflorum
- Eriocaulon depressum R.Br. ex Sm. – NT, Qld, Australia
- Eriocaulon dictyophyllum
- Eriocaulon dregei
- Eriocaulon duthiei
- Eriocaulon echinulatum
- Eriocaulon elenorae
- Eriocaulon ermeiense
- Eriocaulon eurypeplon
- Eriocaulon exsertum
- Eriocaulon faberi
- Eriocaulon fistulosum R.Br. ex Sm. – WA, NT, Qld, Australia
- Eriocaulon fluviatile
- Eriocaulon fysonii
- Eriocaulon giganticum R.J.Davies – Qld, Australia
- Eriocaulon glabripetalum
- Eriocaulon gregatum
- Eriocaulon henryanum

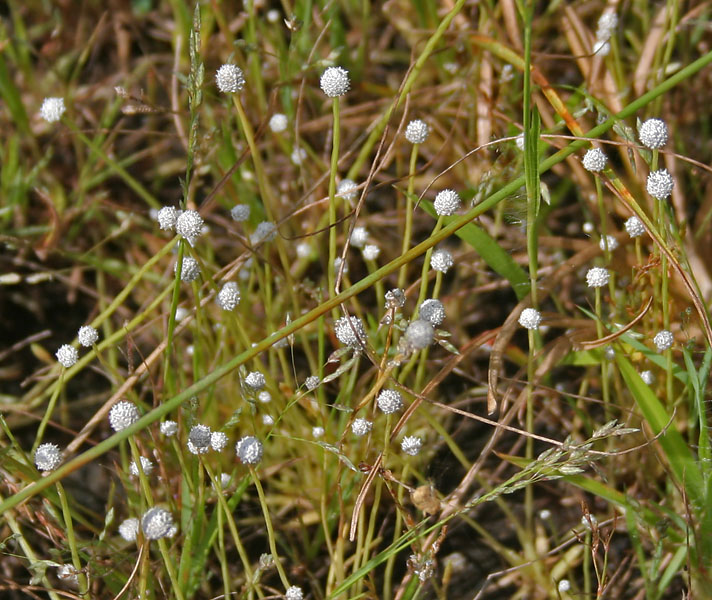
Eriocaulon heterolepis

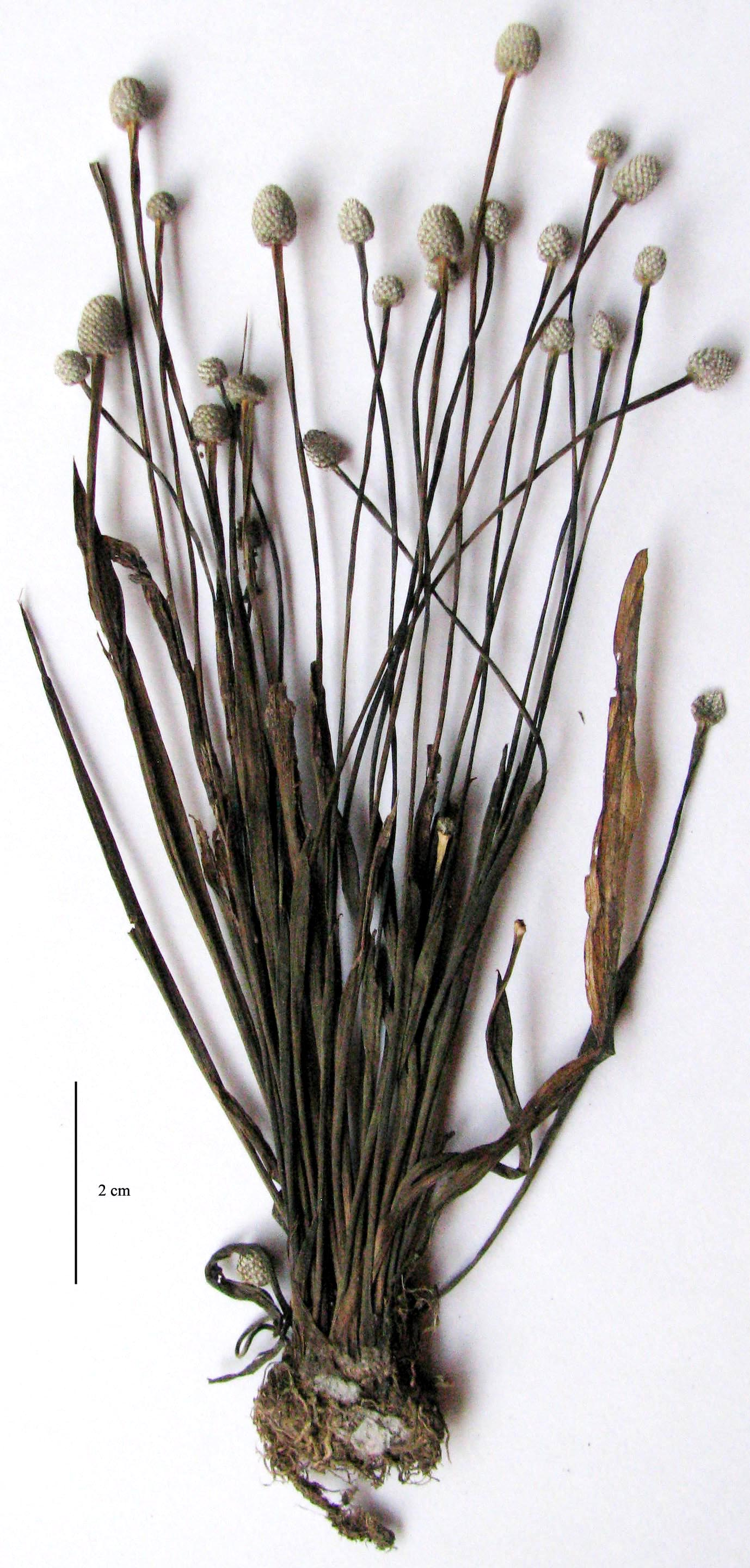
Eriocaulon madayiparense type specimen

- Eriocaulon heterolepis
- Eriocaulon hookerianum
- Eriocaulon hydrophilum
- Eriocaulon inapertum G.J.Leach – WA, NT, Australia
- Eriocaulon inyangense
- Eriocaulon kanarense
- Eriocaulon karaavalense
- Eriocaulon karnatakense
- Eriocaulon kathmanduense
- Eriocaulon koernickianum
- Eriocaulon kolhapurense
- Eriocaulon konkanense
- Eriocaulon koynense
- Eriocaulon kunmingense
- Eriocaulon lanceolatum
- Eriocaulon leianthum
- Eriocaulon leptophyllum
- Eriocaulon leucomelas
- Eriocaulon lineare
- Eriocaulon lividum F.Muell. – Australia
- Eriocaulon longicuspe
- Eriocaulon longifolium
- Eriocaulon longipetalum
- Eriocaulon luzulifolium
- Eriocaulon madayiparense
- Eriocaulon maharashtrense
- Eriocaulon mangshanense
- Eriocaulon margaretae
- Eriocaulon mbalensis
- Eriocaulon meiklei
- Eriocaulon meenachilense Anoop & Robi
- Eriocaulon microcephalum
- Eriocaulon minimum
- Eriocaulon minusculum
- Eriocaulon minutum
- Eriocaulon miquelianum
- Eriocaulon monoscapum F.Muell. – NT, Australia
- Eriocaulon nantoense
- Eriocaulon nanum R.Br. – Qld, Australia
- Eriocaulon nematophyllum G.J.Leach – NT, Qld, Australia
- Eriocaulon nepalense
- Eriocaulon nigrobracteatum
- Eriocaulon obclavatum
- Eriocaulon odontospermum G.J.Leach – WA, NT, Qld, Australia
- Eriocaulon odoratum
- Eriocaulon oryzetorum
- Eriocaulon pallidum R.Br. – Qld, Australia
- Eriocaulon parkeri
- Eriocaulon parviflorum
- Eriocaulon parvulum
- Eriocaulon parvum
- Eriocaulon patericola G.J.Leach – WA, NT, Australia
- Eriocaulon pectinatum
- Eriocaulon peninsulare
- Eriocaulon pusillum Sol. ex R.Br. – WA, NT, Qld, Australia
- Eriocaulon pygmaeum Sol. ex Sm. – WA, NT, Qld, Australia
- Eriocaulon quinquangulare
- Eriocaulon ratnagiricum
- Eriocaulon ravenelii
- Eriocaulon richardianum
- Eriocaulon ritchieanum
- Eriocaulon robustius
- Eriocaulon robustobrownianum
- Eriocaulon robustum
- Eriocaulon rockianum
- Eriocaulon rouxianum
- Eriocaulon sahyadricum
- Eriocaulon santapaui

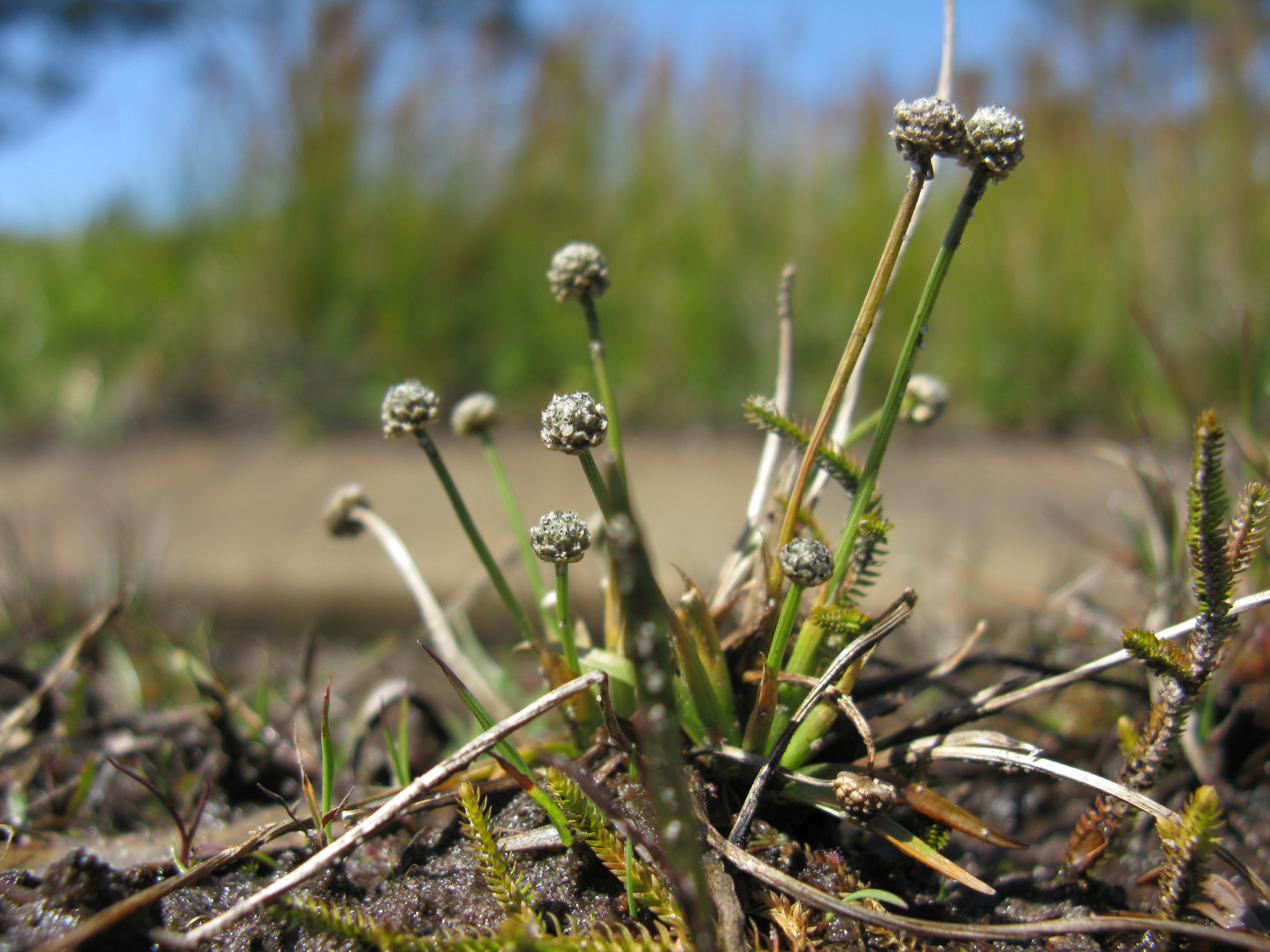
Eriocaulon scariosum

- Eriocaulon scariosum Sm. – Qld, NSW, ACT, Vic., Australia
- Eriocaulon schimperi
- Eriocaulon schlechteri
- Eriocaulon schochianum
- Eriocaulon schultzii Benth. – NT, Australia
- Eriocaulon sclerophyllum
- Eriocaulon scullionii G.J.Leach – WA, NT, Australia
- Eriocaulon sedgwickii
- Eriocaulon selousii
- Eriocaulon setaceum L. – Bangladesh, Cambodia, China, India, Indonesia, Japan, Laos, Myanmar, Sri Lanka, Thailand, Vietnam, WA, NT, Qld, Australia
- Eriocaulon sexangulare
- Eriocaulon sharmae
- Eriocaulon sivarajanii
- Eriocaulon sollyanum
- Eriocaulon spectabile F.Muell. – WA, NT, Qld, Australia
- Eriocaulon staintonii
- Eriocaulon stellulatum
- Eriocaulon stipantepalum
- Eriocaulon taishanense
- Eriocaulon talbotii
- Eriocaulon texense
- Eriocaulon thwaitesii
- Eriocaulon tonkinense
- Eriocaulon tortuosum F.Muell. – WA, NT, Qld, Australia
- Eriocaulon tricornum G.J.Leach – NT, Australia
- Eriocaulon trisectoides
- Eriocaulon truncatum Buch.-Ham. ex Mart. – Qld, Australia, Asia
- Eriocaulon tuberiferum
- Eriocaulon vandaanamensis
- Eriocaulon viride
- Eriocaulon wightianum
- Eriocaulon willdenovianum Moldenke – NT, Qld, Australia
- Eriocaulon xeranthemum
- Eriocaulon zollingerianum Koern. – China, India, Indonesia, Laos, Malaysia, New Guinea, Philippines, Thailand, Vietnam, NT, Qld, Australia

Species accepted by the authoritative Australian Plant Census, informally named, described and published awaiting formal publication

- Eriocaulon sp. C Kimberley Flora (G.J.Keighery 4610) WA Herbarium – WA, Australia
- Eriocaulon sp. E Kimberley Flora (A.S.George 12635) WA Herbarium – WA, Australia
- Eriocaulon sp. G Kimberley Flora (K.F.Kenneally 11374E) WA Herbarium – WA, Australia
- Eriocaulon sp. Harding Range (M.D.Barrett & R.L.Barrett MDB 1826) WA Herbarium – WA, Australia
- Eriocaulon sp. Theda (M.D.Barrett MDB 2063) WA Herbarium – WA, Australia
