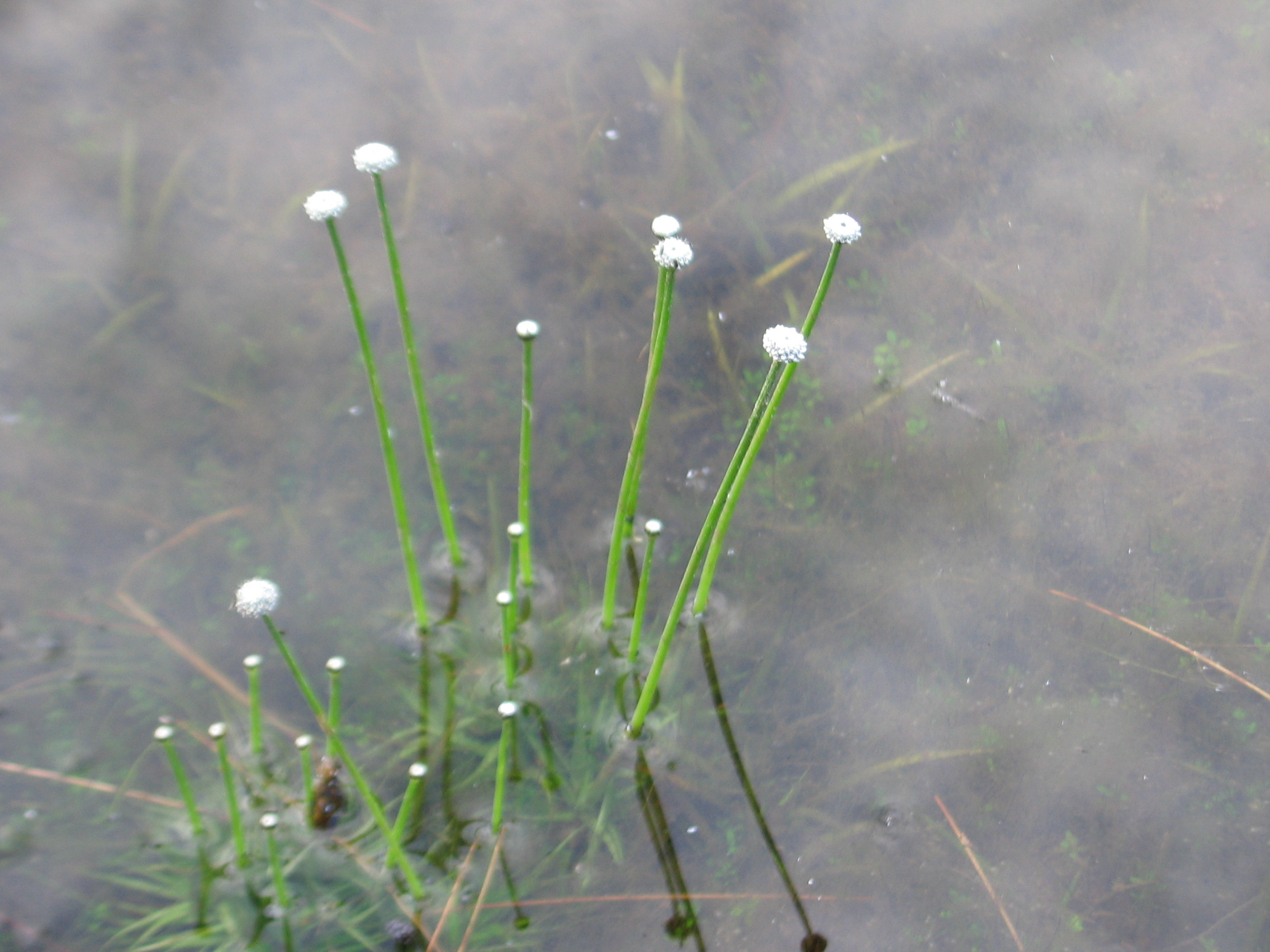

Conservation status
- Least Concern (IUCN 3.1)

- Secure (NatureServe)

Scientific classification
- Kingdom: Plantae
- Clade: Embryophytes
- Clade: Tracheophytes
- Clade: Angiosperms
- Clade: Monocots
- Clade: Commelinids
- Order: Poales
- Family: Eriocaulaceae
- Genus: Eriocaulon
- Species: E. aquaticum

Binomial name
- Eriocaulon aquaticum (Hill) Druce

Synonyms
- Cespa aquatica Hill; Eriocaulon articulatum (Huds.) Morong; Eriocaulon brevifolium Raf.; Eriocaulon pellucidum Michx.; Eriocaulon pellucidum f. clausenii Moldenke; Eriocaulon pellucidum f. pumilum (Raf.) Moldenke; Eriocaulon pumilum Raf.; Eriocaulon septangulare With.; Nasmythia articulata Huds.; Nasmythia septangularis (With.) Mart.

= Eriocaulon aquaticum =

Species of flowering plant

Eriocaulon aquaticum is a species of flowering plant within the genus Eriocaulon and family Eriocaulaceae. It is known by many common names such as the common pipewort, northern pipewort, seven-angled pipewort and hatpins.

== Description ==
Eriocaulon aquaticum is a perennial plant reaching a maximum height of 20 cm on land, however it can reach heights of several feet when submerged underwater. Grass-like, basal leaves sprout from the base of the plant. Blooms are made up of multiple tiny flowers, which are held above the waterline on long, unbranched stems. The flowers are white and possess nectar glands near the tip of each petal to attract pollinating insects. Blooms are monoecious, with male flowers at the centre of the flowerhead and female flowers surrounding them.

== Distribution and habitat ==
This species can only be found in the northern hemisphere. It is widespread throughout North America where it can be found the states of: Alabama, Connecticut, Delaware, Indiana, Maine, Maryland, Massachusetts, Michigan, Minnesota, New Hampshire, New Jersey, New York, North Carolina, Ohio, Pennsylvania, Rhode Island, South Carolina, Vermont, Virginia and Wisconsin. It is also widespread throughout Canada and can be found within the following Canadian Provinces: Labrador, New Brunswick, Newfoundland, Nova Scotia, Ontario and Québec. Within Europe E. aquaticum is only found in the United Kingdom and Ireland.

Eriocaulon aquaticum is a wetland species, which inhabits bogs, ponds, lakes, marshes and slow flowing rivers. It is generally a plant associated with temperate lowland habitats, however it has been recorded living up to 300 metres above sea level.
