= Cubitanthus =

Scientific classification
- Kingdom: Plantae
- Clade: Tracheophytes
- Clade: Angiosperms
- Clade: Eudicots
- Clade: Asterids
- Order: Lamiales
- Family: Linderniaceae
- Genus: Cubitanthus; Barringer
- Species: C. alatus

Binomial name
- Cubitanthus alatus (Cham. & Schltdl.) Barringer

Synonyms
- Species: Anetanthus alatus (Cham. & Schltdl.) Benth. & Hook.f. ex B.D.Jacks.; Russelia alata Cham. & Schltdl.

Genus of flowering plants

Cubitanthus is a monotypic genus of flowering plants belonging to the family Linderniaceae, with one species Cubitanthus alatus. It was previously placed in the Gesneriaceae, and as of April 2021, still is by some sources. Its native range is Northeastern Brazil.

== Taxonomy ==
The genus was erected by Kerry A. Barringer in 1984 for a species originally described in 1828 in Russelia (now a synonym of Vahlia) and then transferred in 1893 to Anetanthus, in the family Gesneriaceae. Molecular phylogenetic studies published from 2013 onwards have shown that it is a basal member of the family Linderniaceae, sister to Stemodiopsis.
