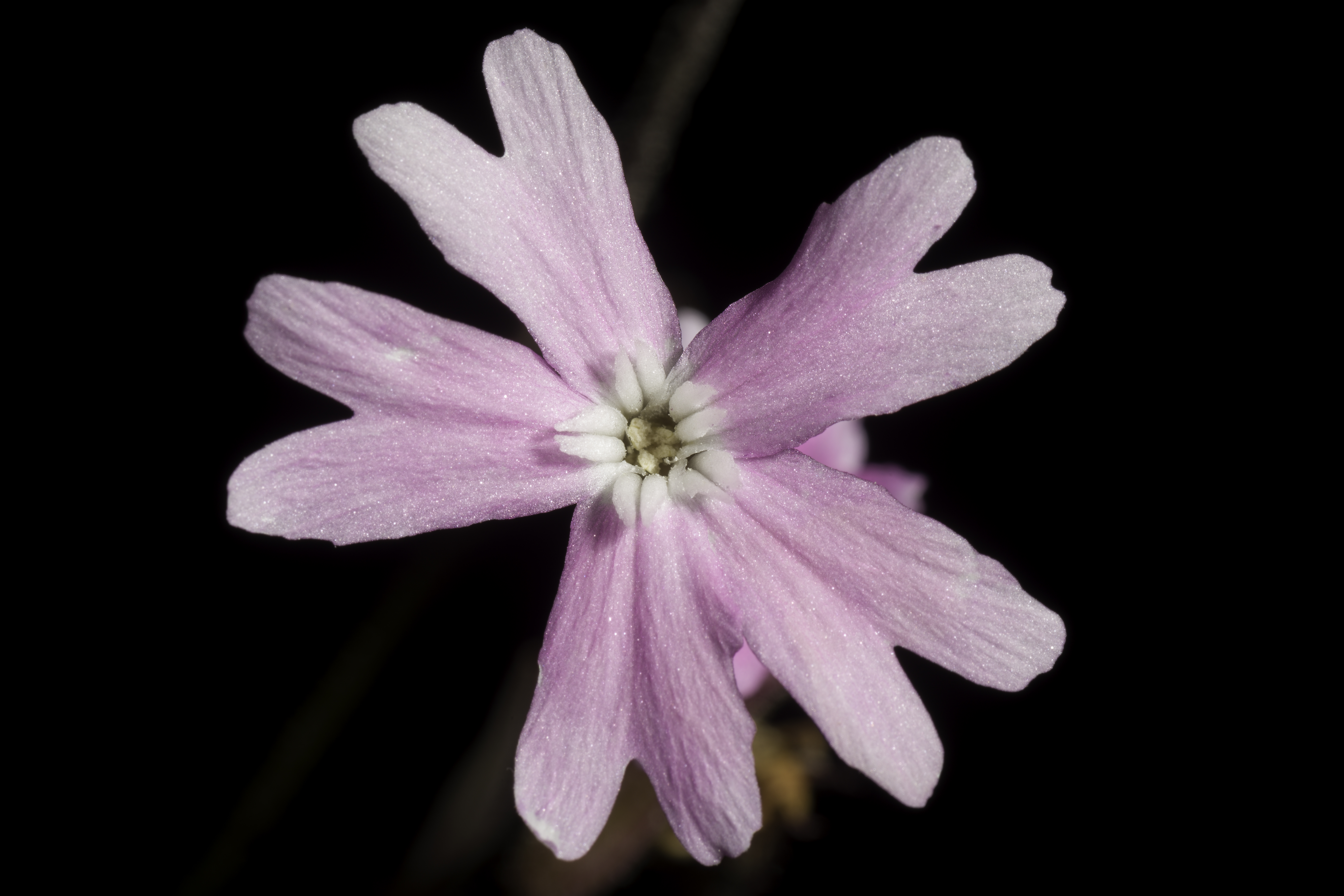

Scientific classification
- Kingdom: Plantae
- Clade: Tracheophytes
- Clade: Angiosperms
- Clade: Eudicots
- Order: Caryophyllales
- Family: Caryophyllaceae
- Genus: Silene
- Species: S. akaisialpina

Binomial name
- Silene akaisialpina T.Yamaz. (1997)

= Silene akaisialpina =

Species of plant

Silene akaisialpina is a species of plant native to the mountains of central Honshu, Japan . It has also been reported on the island of Hokkaido.

In 1955, it was recognized by Takasi Yamazaki as a variety of Silene keiskei, called Melandrium keiskei var. akaisialpinum. It was later renamed Silene keiskei var. akaisialpina and then reclassified as its own species in 1997.

== Gallery ==
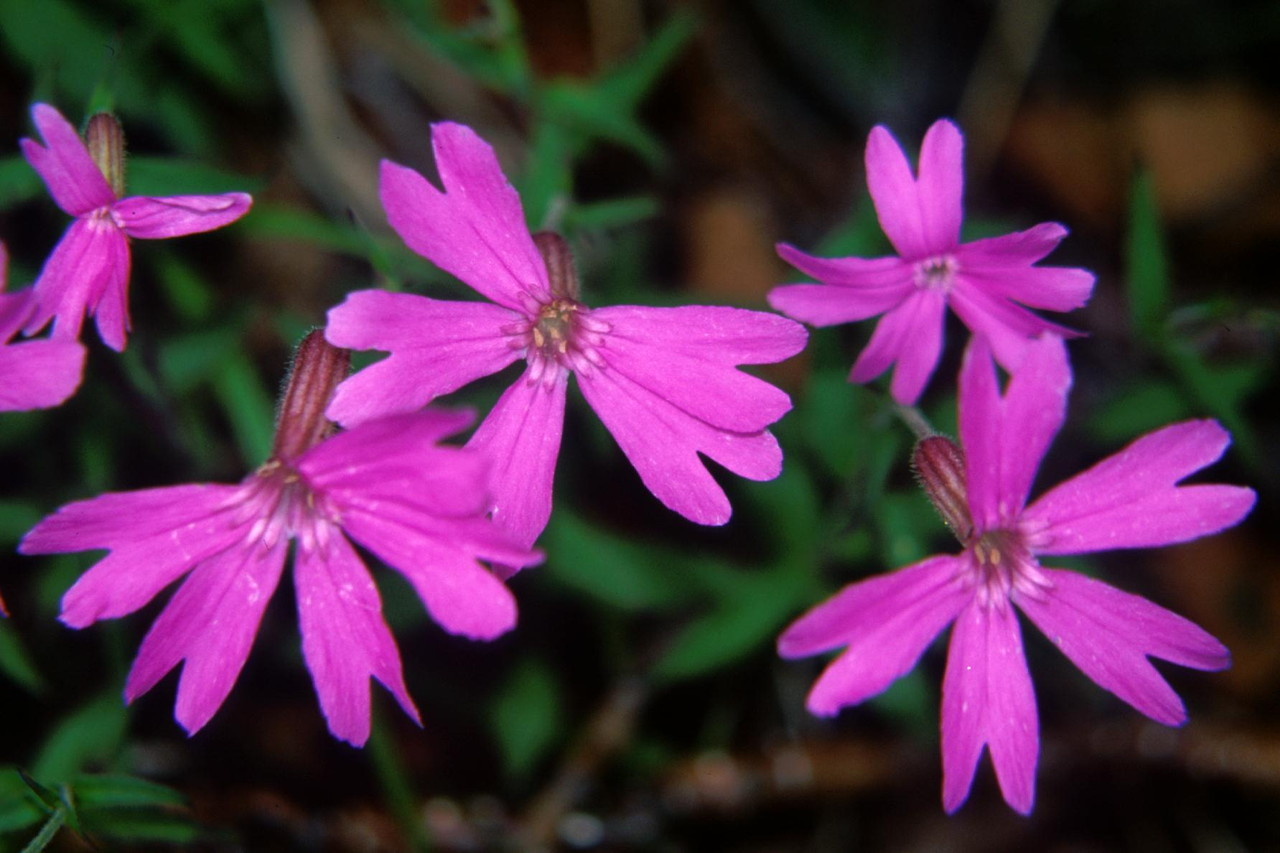
