= Lindernia intrepida =

Conservation status
- Least Concern (IUCN 3.1)

Scientific classification
- Kingdom: Plantae
- Clade: Tracheophytes
- Clade: Angiosperms
- Clade: Eudicots
- Clade: Asterids
- Order: Lamiales
- Family: Linderniaceae
- Genus: Lindernia; Dinter ex Heil
- Species: L. intrepida

Binomial name
- Lindernia intrepida (Dinter ex Heil) Oberm.

Synonyms
- Chamaegigas intrepidus Dinter ex Heil

Genus of aquatic plants

Lindernia intrepida is a species of aquatic plant that is native to central-west Namibia, growing in semi-arid and savanna regions. It grows in shallow temporary pools on granite inselbergs, surviving regular environmental extremes that include drastic daily changes in temperature and pH, along with extreme fluctuations in wetting and drying. It was previously known as Chamaegigas intrepidus, meaning "intrepid dwarf giant", referring to the tiny plant's ability to thrive even in the desert.

== Description ==
Lindernia intrepida grows in intertwined mats, with two different leaves. One is an underwater awl-shaped leaf that is 1 to 2 cm (0.39 to 0.79 in) long. Two pairs of unequal length leaves float on the water, 5 to 7 mm (0.20 to 0.28 in) and oval-shaped. The plant grows from a small 1 mm (0.039 in) rhizome growing in a combination of sand, organic debris, leaf remains, and animal dung that is 1 cm (0.39 in) deep. The flowers have two lips, and are white or pale pink with purple speckles.

Lindernia intrepida is one of approximately 330 desiccant-tolerant vascular plants, 90% of which are found growing on inselbergs. It is one of the rare desiccant-tolerant vascular plants that is not a fern or monocotyledon. The basal leaves can survive complete drying for 4.5 months, with more than 50% of them reviving after receiving moisture—so the plants simply resume growing once the pools fill again after a dry spell. New floating leaves, which do not survive drying as well as the basal leaves, can reach the water surface as soon as 2–4 days after the pool refills, with flowers appearing as early as 4 days after breaking dormancy.

== Taxonomy ==
Lindernia intrepida was discovered by German botanist Kurt Dinter in 1909. The previous binomial name translates to "intrepid dwarf giant", referring to the small plant's ability to survive the most extreme conditions. It is considered to be a resurrection plant because it quickly revives from complete dormancy.

== Habitat and distribution ==
The plant is native to central-west Namibia, growing in semi-arid conditions in very shallow (15 cm (5.9 in)) temporary pools in granitic rock. The pools can dry out and refill 15 to 20 times each year. The pools also go through daily extremes of temperature and pH. Water temperatures can range from 6 to 40 °C (43 to 104 °F) between day and night, while the late afternoon water pH can be greater than 10 and morning pH less than 6. The rhizomes can also be exposed to 50 °C (122 °F) temperatures during the 11-month dry season.
