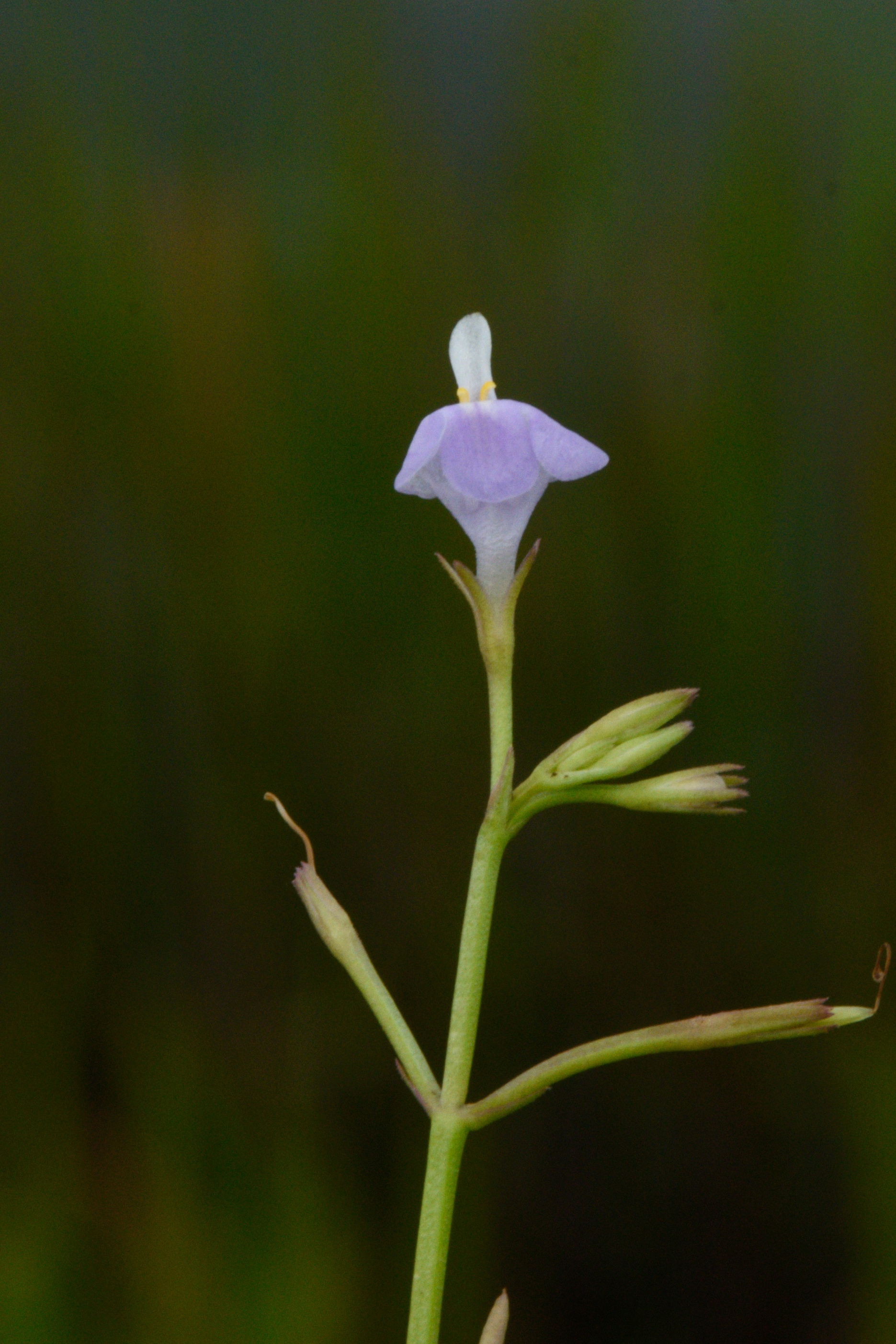
- Bonnaya antipoda at Karakkund

Conservation status
- Least Concern (IUCN 3.1)

Scientific classification
- Kingdom: Plantae
- Clade: Tracheophytes
- Clade: Angiosperms
- Clade: Eudicots
- Clade: Asterids
- Order: Lamiales
- Family: Linderniaceae
- Genus: Bonnaya
- Species: B. antipoda

Binomial name
- Bonnaya antipoda (L.) Druce

Synonyms
- See text

= Bonnaya antipoda =

Species of plant

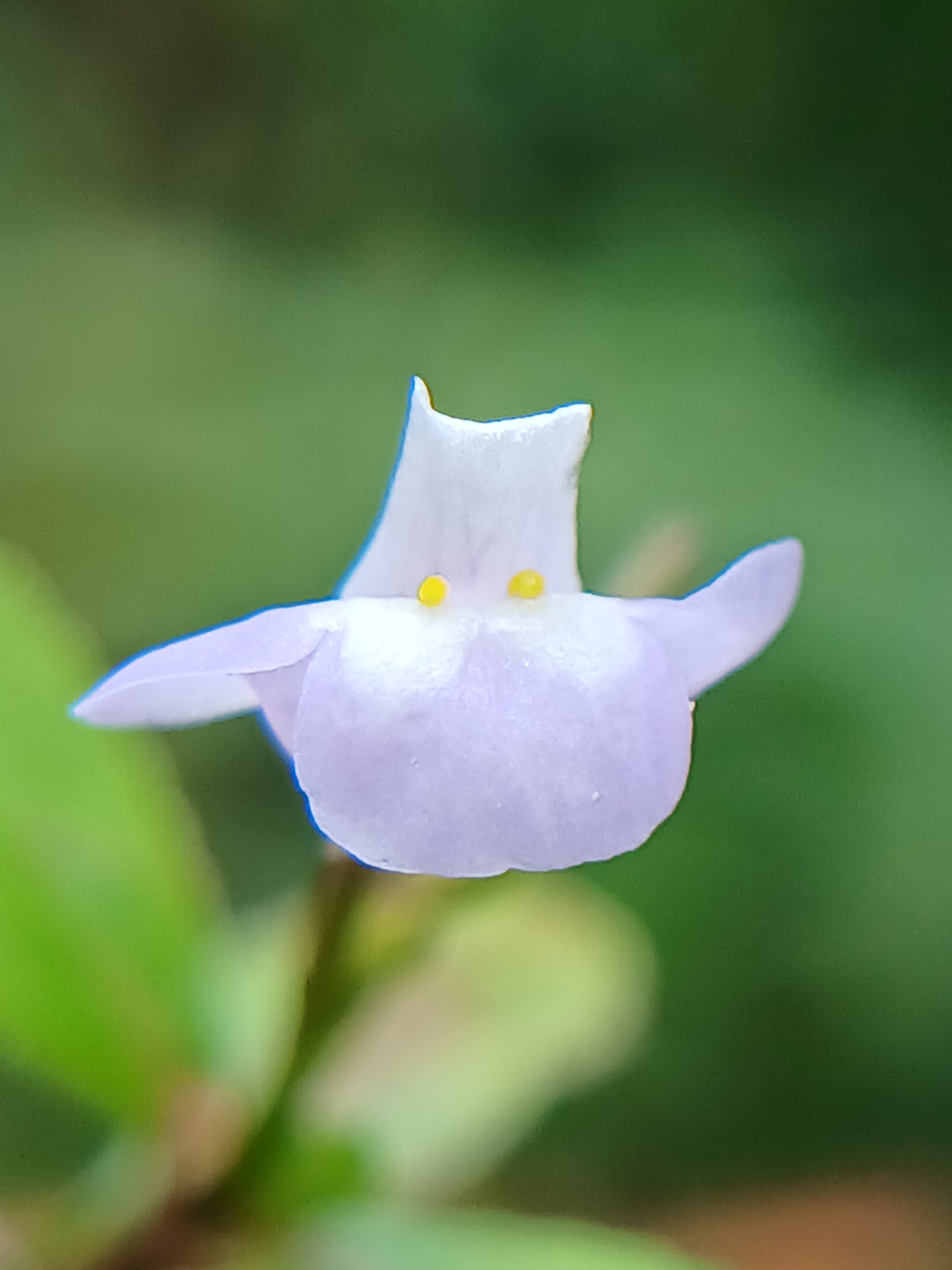
Flower close-up

Bonnaya antipoda is a herbaceous perennial plant belonging to Linderniaceae family. It is native to tropical and sub-tropical Asia and Australia.

== Description ==
It is a prostrate or diffuse herb usually rooting at nodes. Sub-sessile, hairless leaves are elliptic or obovoid. Solitary pale blue flowers have a yellow mouth. August to October is the flowering and fruiting season. In Australia this species is confined to northeastern Queensland. Flowering there occurs through much of the year, with a peak of activity around April and May (statistics from iNaturalist based on 18 observations in Australia as at 17 April 2024).

== Synonyms ==
As of 17 April 2024, Plants of the World Online recognises 42 synonyms of this species, as follows:

- Ruellia antipoda L.
- Ilysanthes antipoda (L.) Merr.
- Lindernia antipoda (L.) Alston
- Vandellia antipoda (L.) T.Yamaz.
- Ruellia serrata Thunb.
- Cyrtandra capsularis Blanco
- Cyrtandra glaberrima Blanco
- Cyrtandra serrata Blanco
- Didymocarpus blancoi Hassk.
- Didymocarpus grandiflorus A.Dietr. ex Steud.
- Henckelia grandiflora (Retz.) A.Dietr.
- Roettlera capsularis Kuntze
- Bonnaya bracteata Griff.
- Bonnaya cyanea Griff.
- Bonnaya grandiflora (Retz.) Spreng.
- Bonnaya penicillata Nees
- Bonnaya pulegiifolia (Vahl) Spreng.
- Bonnaya rothii A.Dietr.
- Bonnaya roxburghiana A.Dietr.
- Bonnaya verbenifolia (Colsm.) Spreng.
- Bonnaya veronicifolia var. angustifolia C.T.White & W.D.Francis
- Bonnaya veronicifolia var. grandiflora (Retz.) Hook.f.
- Bonnaya veronicifolia var. verbenifolia (Colsm.) Hook.f.
- Ilysanthes serrata (Thunb.) Makino
- Ilysanthes verbenifolia (Colsm.) Kerr ex Barnett
- Ilysanthes veronicifolia var. verbenifolia Makino
- Lindernia anagallis var. grandiflora (Retz.) Mukerjee
- Lindernia antipoda subsp. verbenifolia (Colsm.) Bennet
- Lindernia pachypoda (Franch. & Sav.) Matsum.
- Lindernia verbenifolia (Colsm.) Pennell
- Pyxidaria pachypoda (Franch. & Sav.) Kuntze
- Tittmannia colemannii Benth.
- Torenia gracilis Benth.
- Vandellia anagallis var. verbenifolia (Colsm.) T.Yamaz.
- Vandellia pachypoda Franch. & Sav.
- Vandellia serrata (Thunb.) Nakai
- Vandellia verbenifolia (Colsm.) Haines
- Gratiola grandiflora Retz.
- Gratiola pulegiifolia Vahl
- Gratiola racemosa Roth
- Gratiola roxburghiana Schult.
- Gratiola verbenifolia Colsm.
