= Scolophyllum =

Scientific classification
- Kingdom: Plantae
- Clade: Tracheophytes
- Clade: Angiosperms
- Clade: Eudicots
- Clade: Asterids
- Order: Lamiales
- Family: Linderniaceae
- Genus: Scolophyllum; T.Yamaz.

Genus of plants

Scolophyllum is a genus of flowering plants belonging to the family Linderniaceae.

Its native range is Indo-China.

Species:

- Scolophyllum ilicifolium (Bonati) T.Yamaz.
- Scolophyllum longitubum T.Yamaz. & Chuakul
- Scolophyllum spinifidum (Kerr ex Barnett) T.Yamaz.
