= Pilosocereus catimbauensis =

Scientific classification
- Kingdom: Plantae
- Clade: Tracheophytes
- Clade: Angiosperms
- Clade: Eudicots
- Order: Caryophyllales
- Family: Cactaceae
- Subfamily: Cactoideae
- Genus: Pilosocereus
- Species: P. catimbauensis

Binomial name
- Pilosocereus catimbauensis Taylor & Albuq.-Lima, 2022

Synonyms
- Pilosocereus chrysostele subsp. catimbauensis N.P.Taylor & Albuq.-Lima

Species of cactus

Pilosocereus catimbauensis is a species of cactus native to Catimbau National Park, Brazil.

== Description ==
Growing up to 3 metres (120 in) tall, P. catimbauensis is trunkless, branches at the base, and 14-18 ribs. Branches are slender, only 5.5 centimetres (2.2 in) in diameter; flowers are also smaller than P. chrysostele at 5 centimetres (2.0 in) x 2 centimetres (0.79 in). A cephalium is present was not well developed.

== Taxonomy ==
Pilosocereus catimbauensis was originally described in 2020 as subspecies of Pilosocereus chrysostele. However, in 2022, evidence of P. catimbauensis being distinct was found. P. catimbauensis has the smallest seeds of any Pilosocereus at only 1 millimetre (0.039 in), suggesting that P. catimbauensis could even be unrelated to P. chrysostele.

== Pollination ==
Pilosocereus catimbauensis is pollinated by the bat species Glossophaga soricina and Lonchophyla mordax.

== Ecology ==
Pilosocereus catimbauensis grows sympatrically with Catimbaua pendula, Tillandsia catimbauensis, Acritopappus buiquensis, and Mandevilla catimbauensis.

== Etymology ==
The specific epithet "Catimbauensis" refers Catimbau National Park, where this species is endemic to.
