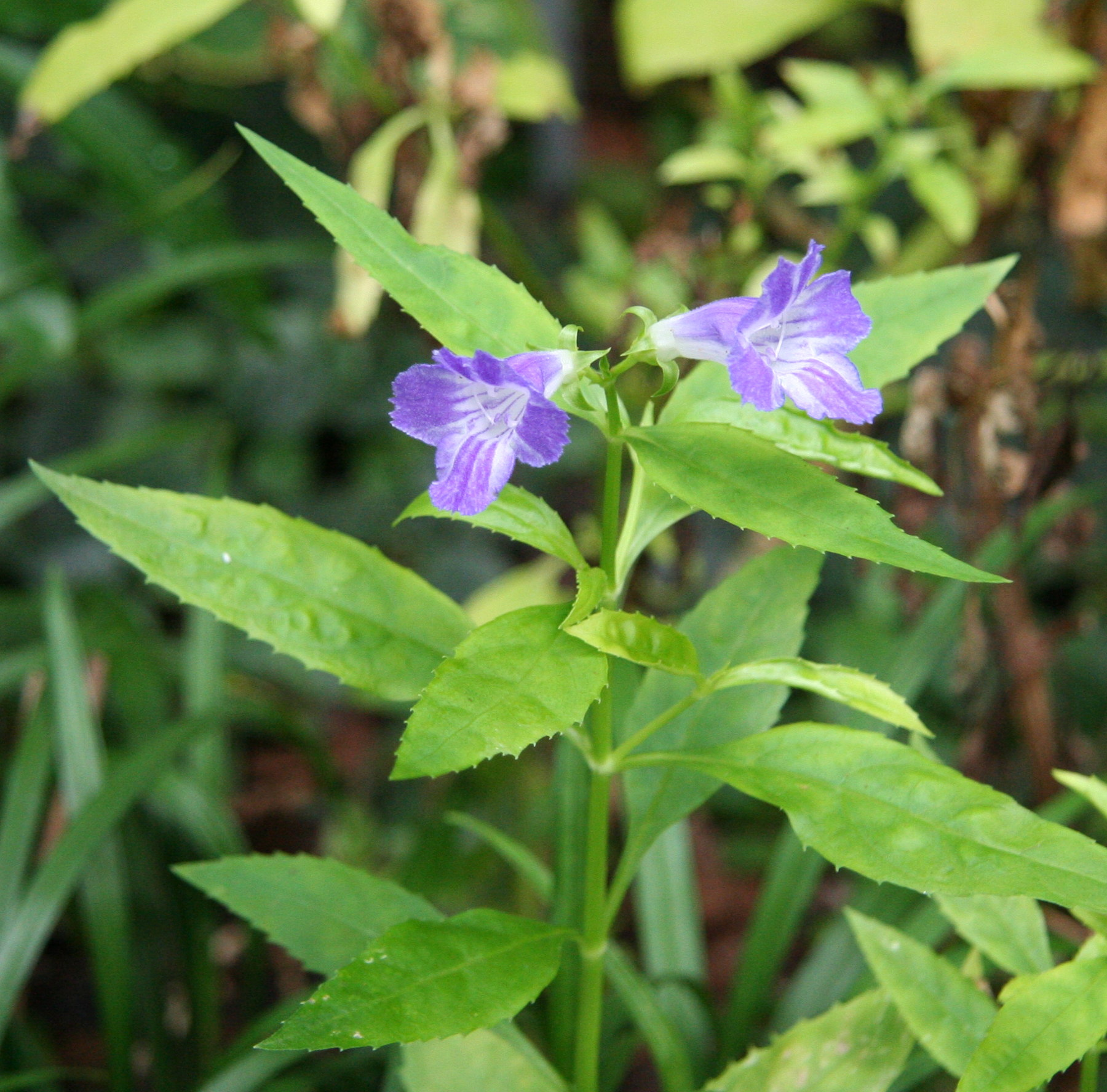

Scientific classification
- Kingdom: Plantae
- Clade: Tracheophytes
- Clade: Angiosperms
- Clade: Eudicots
- Clade: Asterids
- Order: Lamiales
- Family: Linderniaceae
- Genus: Artanema
- Species: A. fimbriatum

Binomial name
- Artanema fimbriatum D.Don

= Artanema fimbriatum =

Koala bells

Species of flowering plant

Artanema fimbriatum, OR koala bells, is a short lived herbaceous plant found in eastern Australia. Growing to one metre tall. The habitat is moist sites and on hillsides, in areas of relatively high rainfall.
