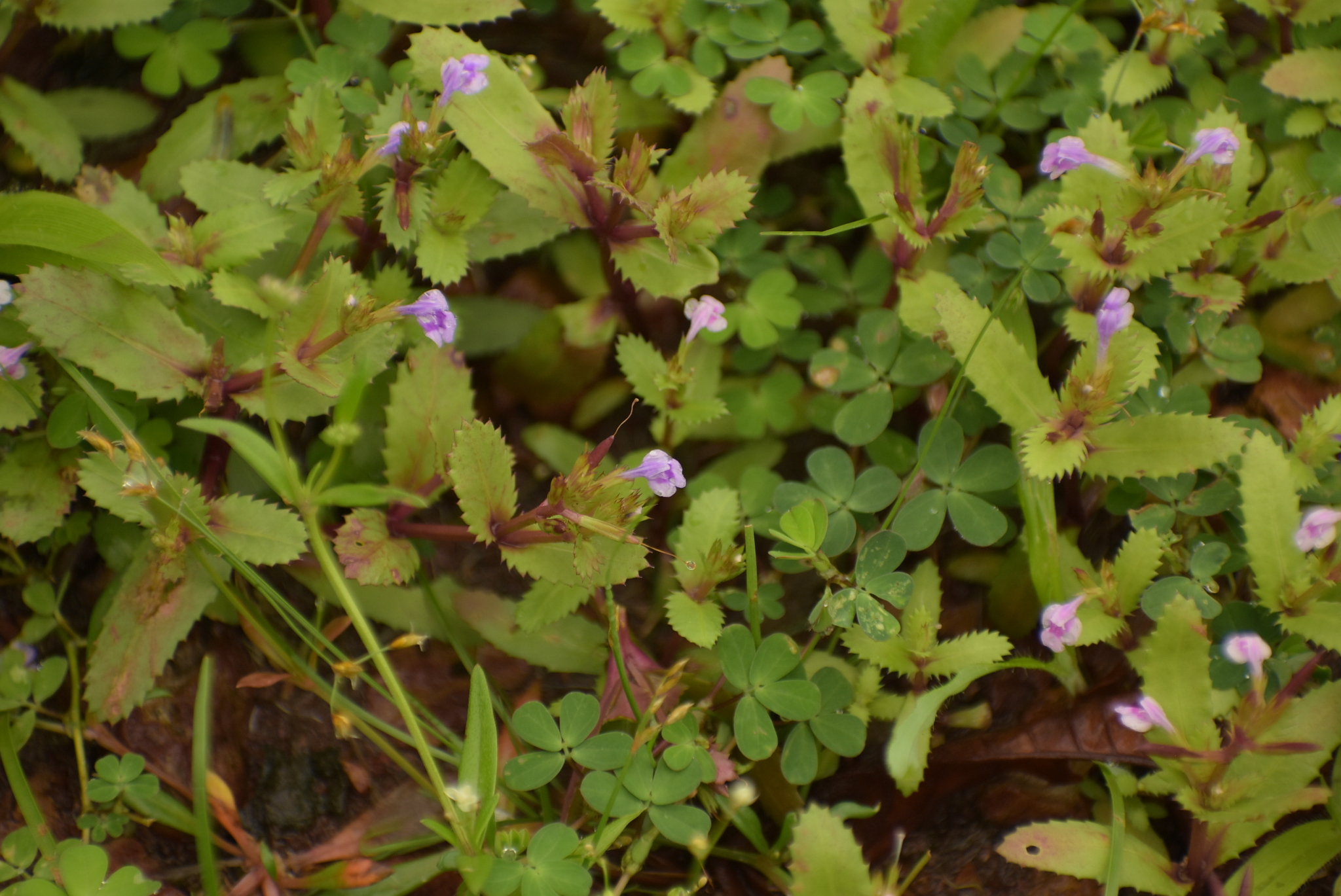

Scientific classification
- Kingdom: Plantae
- Clade: Tracheophytes
- Clade: Angiosperms
- Clade: Eudicots
- Clade: Asterids
- Order: Lamiales
- Family: Linderniaceae
- Genus: Bonnaya
- Species: B. ciliata

Binomial name
- Bonnaya ciliata (Colsm.) Spreng.

= Bonnaya ciliata =

Species of plant

Bonnaya ciliata, the fringed pimpernel, is a species of flowering plant in the family Linderniaceae. This annual, broad-leaved herb grows up to 13 cm high and is native to tropical and subtropical regions of Asia and northern Australia. Its native range includes the Himalayas, Western Ghats, Burma, parts of China, Taiwan, Malaysia, and Australia, thriving primarily in seasonally dry tropical biomes. The plant features oppositely arranged, lanceolate-oblong leaves with serrated margins and produces light purple or white flowers in racemes.
