= Micranthemum glomeratum =

Conservation status
- Vulnerable (NatureServe)

Scientific classification
- Kingdom: Plantae
- Clade: Tracheophytes
- Clade: Angiosperms
- Clade: Eudicots
- Clade: Asterids
- Order: Lamiales
- Family: Linderniaceae
- Genus: Micranthemum
- Species: M. glomeratum

Binomial name
- Micranthemum glomeratum (Chapm.) Shinners

Synonyms
- Synonymy: Micranthemum nuttallii var. glomeratum Chapm.; Hemianthus glomeratus Pennell

Species of aquatic plant

Micranthemum glomeratum, commonly known as manatee mudflower is a species of plant in the family Linderniaceae. This plant is commonly sold incorrectly under the name of a similar species, Micranthemum micranthemoides, in aquascaping. It is endemic to Florida and grows on the margins of lakes and streams on sandy substrates.
