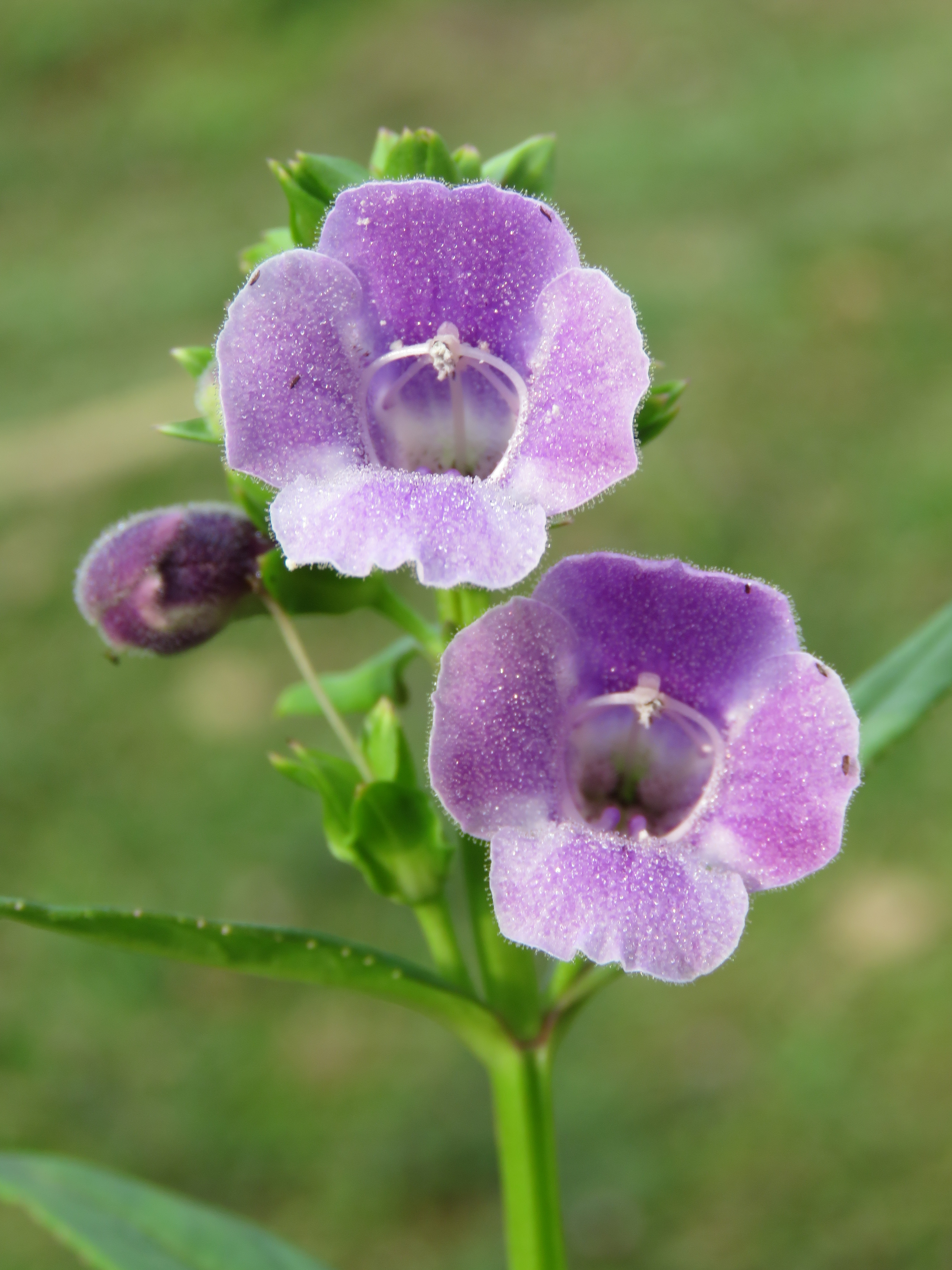
- Artanema longifolium at Periya

Scientific classification
- Kingdom: Plantae
- Clade: Tracheophytes
- Clade: Angiosperms
- Clade: Eudicots
- Clade: Asterids
- Order: Lamiales
- Family: Linderniaceae
- Genus: Artanema
- Species: A. longifolium

Binomial name
- Artanema longifolium (L.) Vatke

= Artanema longifolium =

Species of flowering plant

Artanema longifolium is an edible flowering plant species found in tropical Africa, India and South-East Asia. Extracts are used in Ayurveda medicines to treat myositis and nausea. The leaves can also be cooked and eaten as a leafy vegetable. The roots are root used to treat rheumatism, diarrhea, syphilis and ophthalmitis.
