= Jean Baptiste Louis Pierre =

French botanist (1833-1905)

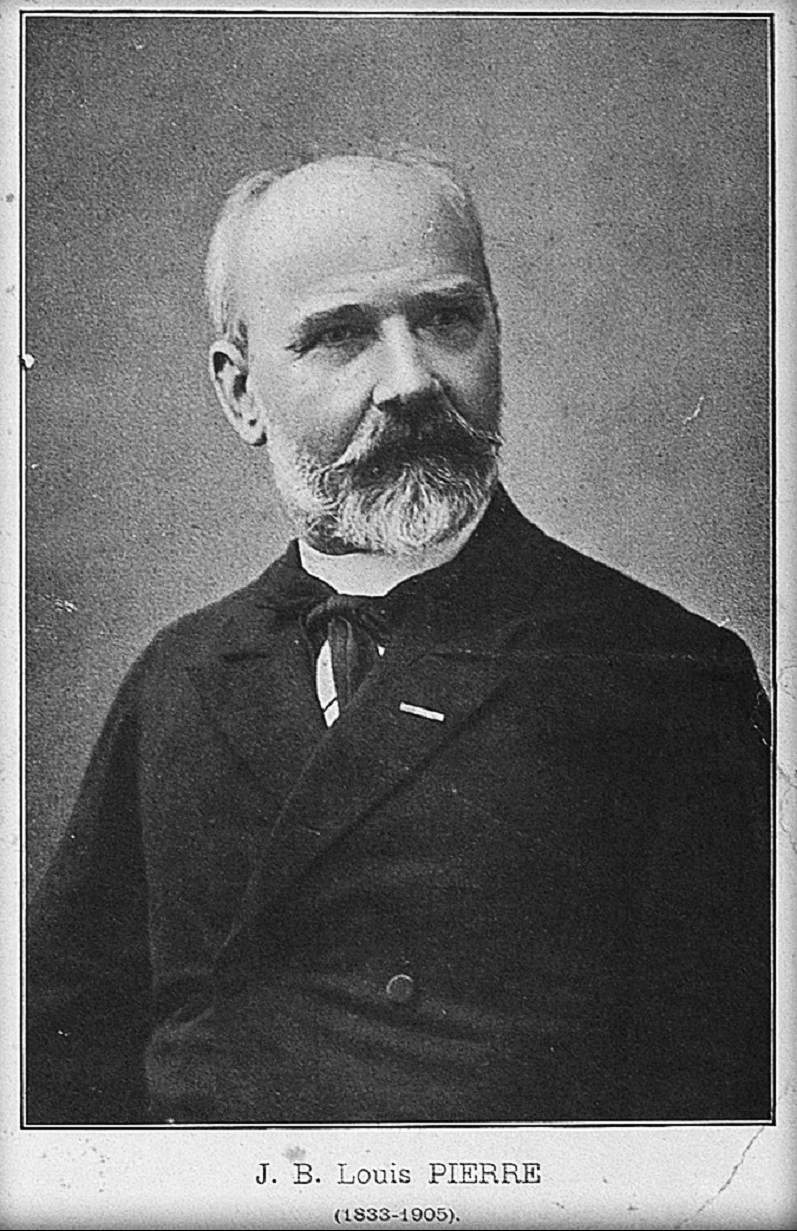
Jean Baptiste Louis Pierre

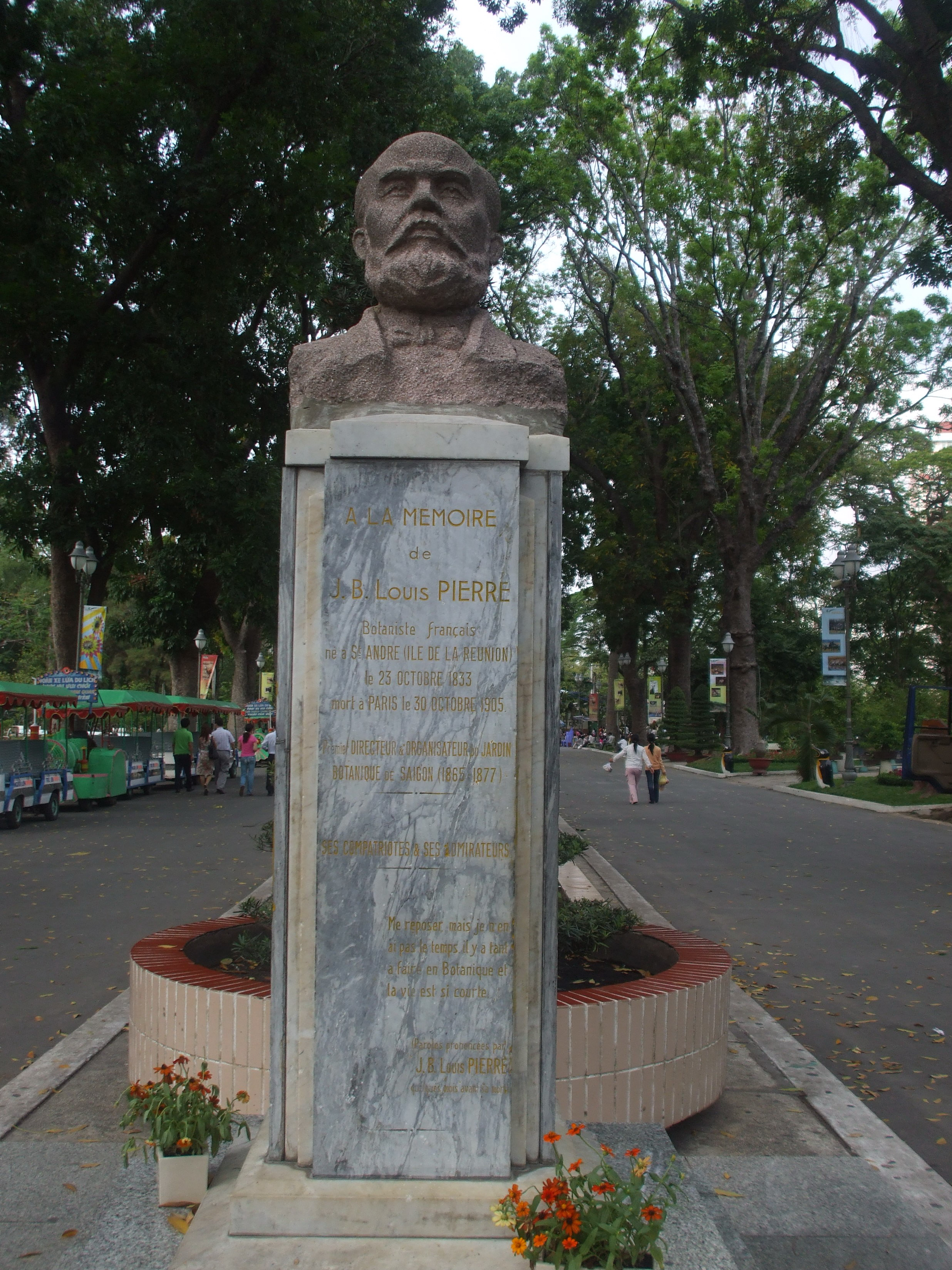
Pierre's bust in Ho Chi Minh City

Jean Baptiste Louis Pierre (23 October 1833 – 30 October 1905), also known as J. B. Louis Pierre, was a French botanist known for his Asian studies. The standard author abbreviation Pierre is used to indicate this person as the author when citing a botanical name.

== Early life ==
Pierre was born in Saint-André, Réunion, and studied in Paris before working in the botanical gardens of Calcutta, India.

== Career ==
In 1864 he founded the Saigon Zoo and Botanical Gardens, which he directed until 1877. Afterward, he returned to Paris and lived at 63 rue Monge, near the Paris Herbarium. In 1883, he moved to Charenton, then to Villeneuve-Saint-Georges, then (circa 1893) to Saint-Mandé. Finally, he settled at 18 rue Cuvier in Paris, where he resided until his death.

Pierre made many scientific explorations in tropical Asia. His publications include the Flore forestière de la Cochinchine (1880-1907), an article "Sur les plantes à caoutchouc de l'Indochine" (Revue des cultures coloniales, 1903) and the section on Sapotaceae in the Notes botaniques (1890-1891).

Several genera have been named in Pierre's honor: in 1907, Heinrich Gustav Adolf Engler (1844-1930) named Pierreodendron of the family Simaroubaceae, and in 1909, Pierrina of the family Scytopetalaceae. in 1912, Gustave Henri Bonati (1873-1927) named Pierranthus of the family Linderniaceae, and in 1891, Henry Fletcher Hance (1827-1886) named Pierrea of the family Flacourtiaceae (now listed as a synonym of Hopea Roxb.).

In 1933, a bust in his honor was dedicated in the Saigon Zoo and Botanical Gardens.

== Other sources ==
- F. J. Breteler, "Novitates Gabonenses 55. Manuscript names and drawings of the French botanist Louis Pierre (1833-1905): a discussion about their validity with some examples of nomenclatural consequences for the Gabonese flora in particular", Herbarium Vadense, Biosystematics Group, Wageningen University, Wageningen (Netherlands).
- Umberto Quattrocchi (2000). CRC World Dictionary of Plant Names, CRC Press : 2896 p. ISBN 0-8493-2673-7.
- A. Chevalier, "J.B.-Louis Pierre, 1833-1905, botaniste français", Agric. pratiq. Pays Chauds: 1-15, 1906.
- F. Gagnepain, "J.-B.-Louis Pierre (1833-1905). Notice nécrologique", Nouv. Arch. Mus. Hist. nat. Paris, sér. 4, 8: xix-xxxi, 1906.
- F. Gagnepain, "Notice biographique sur J.-B.-Louis Pierre", Bull. Soc. bot. France 53: 54–59, 1906.
- Bulletin de la Société des études indo-chinoises de Saigon, v.13, page 179, 1939.
- Journal of the Bombay Natural History Society, v.59, page 348, 1962.
- Bulletin de la Société des études indochinoises, pages 184–185, 1974.
