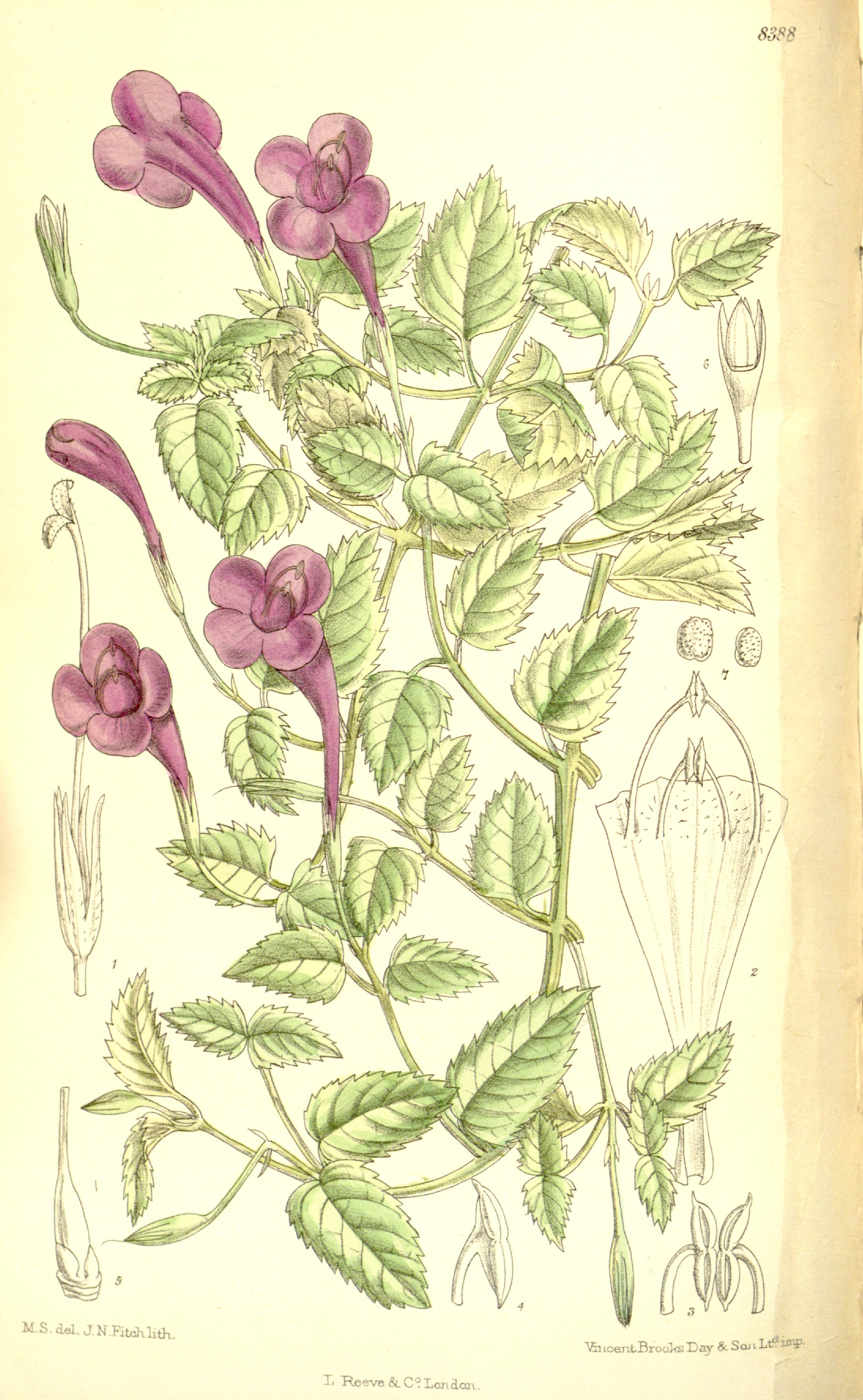
- Torenia atropurpurea

Scientific classification
- Kingdom: Plantae
- Clade: Embryophytes
- Clade: Tracheophytes
- Clade: Angiosperms
- Clade: Eudicots
- Clade: Asterids
- Order: Lamiales
- Family: Linderniaceae
- Genus: Schizotorenia; T.Yamaz.

= Schizotorenia =

Genus of plants

Schizotorenia is a genus of flowering plants belonging to the family Linderniaceae.

Its native range is Indo-China to Peninsular Malaysia.

Species:

- Schizotorenia atropurpurea (Ridl.) T.Yamaz.
- Schizotorenia finetiana (Bonati) T.Yamaz.
