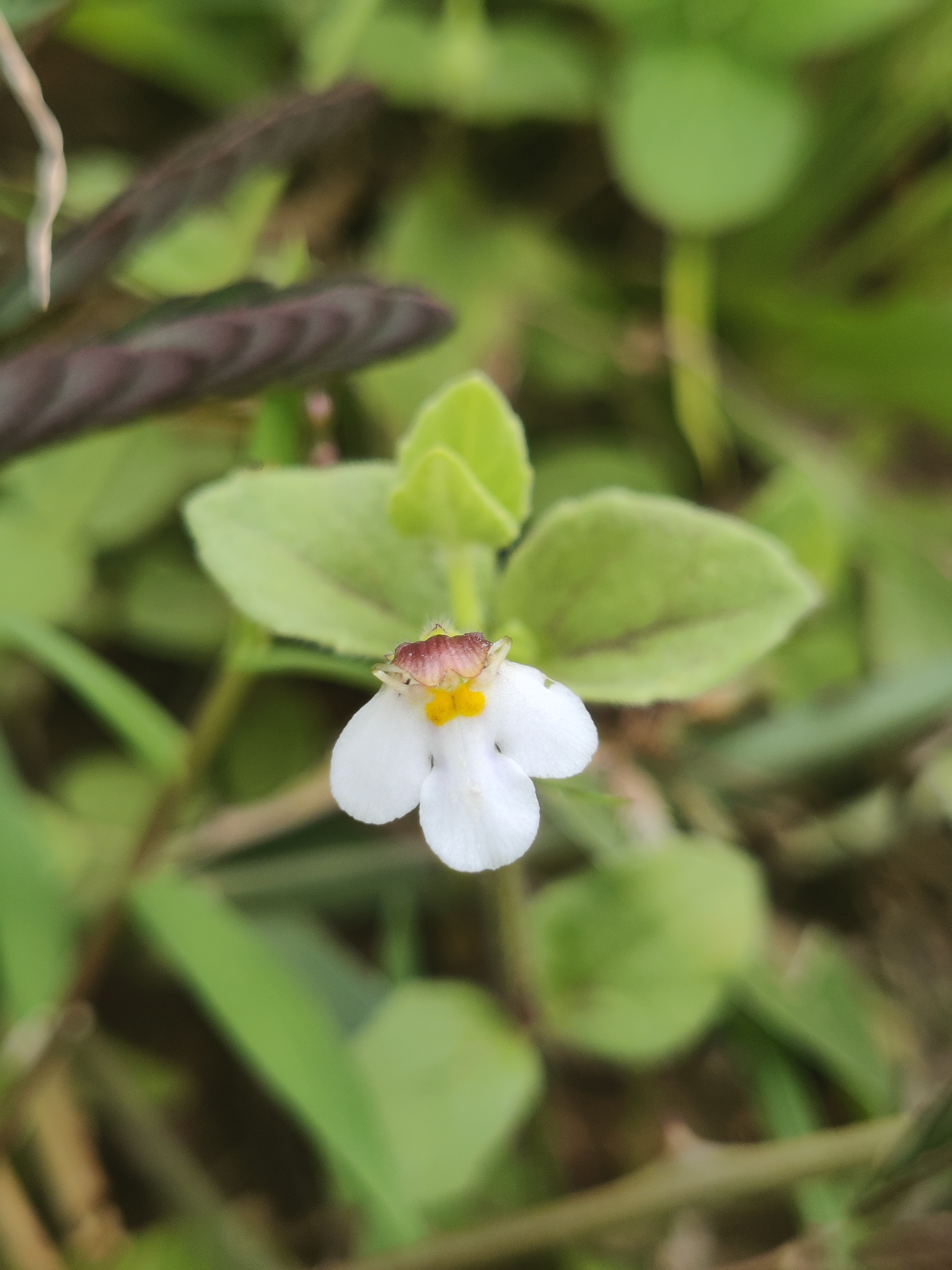

Scientific classification
- Kingdom: Plantae
- Clade: Tracheophytes
- Clade: Angiosperms
- Clade: Eudicots
- Clade: Asterids
- Order: Lamiales
- Family: Linderniaceae
- Genus: Vandellia
- Species: V. diffusa

Binomial name
- Vandellia diffusa L.

Synonyms
- Lindernia diffusa (L.) Wettst.; Torenia diffusa (L.)Roxb.

= Vandellia diffusa =

Species of flowering plant

Vandellia diffusa is a flowering plant belonging to the family Linderniaceae. The genus Vandellia comprised about 52 species in the world. In India, it represents about seven species. Vandellia diffusa is native to parts of Central Africa, Madagascar and Turkey and has been introduced into Central America, South America, India and other parts of Asia. This small annual herb spreads up to 30 cm, with 4-sided, slightly hairy stems and oval or round, tooth-edged leaves. The flowers are white with a purple tinge, growing singly in leaf axils. The tubular green calyx is hairy, and the corolla has a purplish upper lip with a yellow-marked lower lip. The plant has four stamens and produces smooth, elongated capsules containing tiny yellow seeds.
