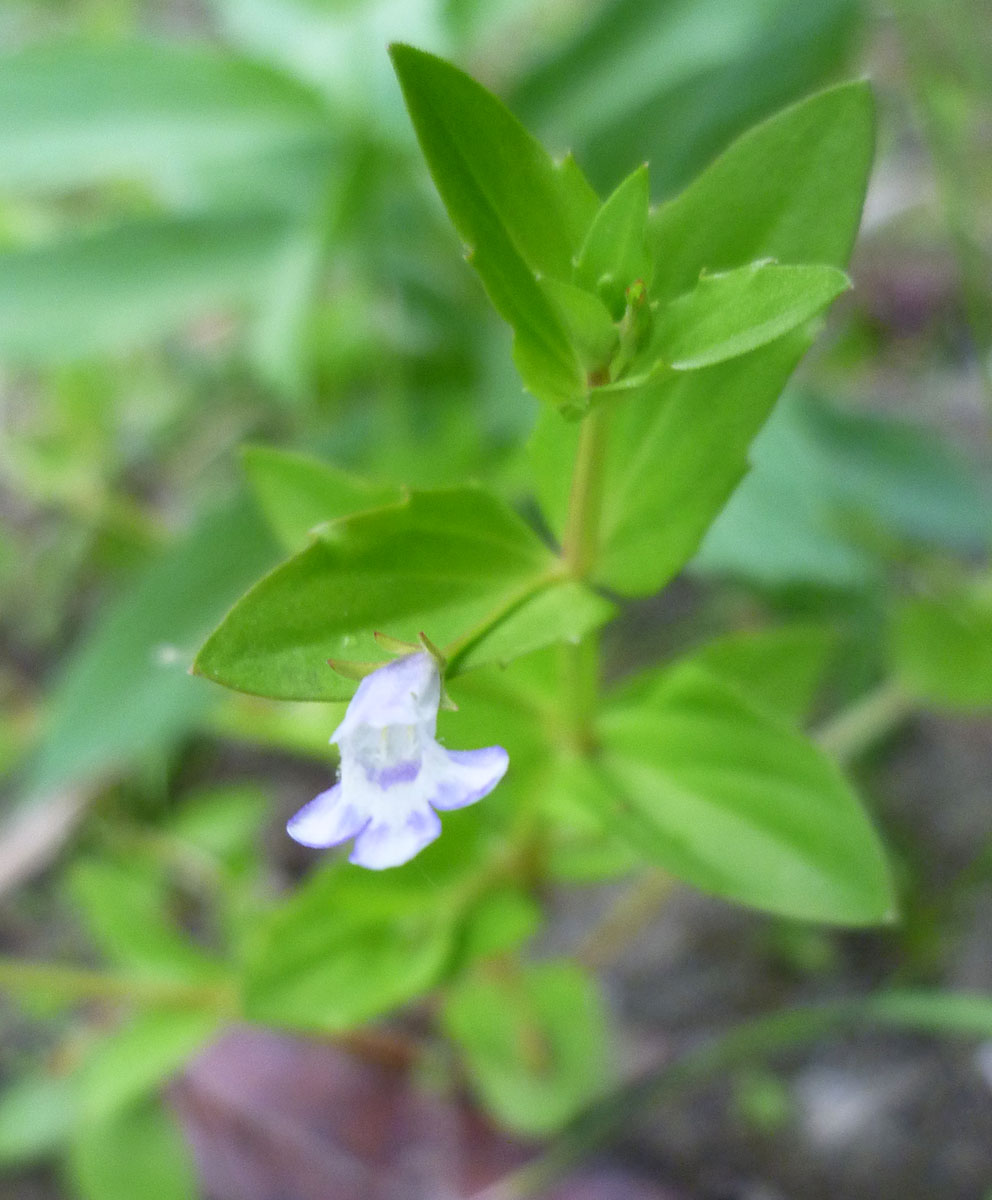

Conservation status
- Secure (NatureServe)

Scientific classification
- Kingdom: Plantae
- Clade: Tracheophytes
- Clade: Angiosperms
- Clade: Eudicots
- Clade: Asterids
- Order: Lamiales
- Family: Linderniaceae
- Genus: Lindernia
- Species: L. dubia

Binomial name
- Lindernia dubia (L.) Pennell

Varieties
- L. dubia var. dubia; L. dubia var. rhizomatosa

Synonyms
- List: Ilysanthes dubia (L.) Barnhart; Ilysanthes gratioloides Benth.; Gratiola dubia L.; Limnophila dubia (L.) M.R.Almeida; Capraria gratioloides L.

= Lindernia dubia =

Yellowseed false pimpernel

Plant species in the false-pimpernel family

Lindernia dubia is a species of flowering plant known by the common names yellowseed false pimpernel and moist bank pimpernel. It is a member of the "new" plant family Linderniaceae, and it is sometimes treated as a member of the families Scrophulariaceae and Plantaginaceae. It is native to much of the Americas from Canada to Chile, and it can be found on other continents as an introduced species. It grows in wet habitat, such as riverbanks, pond margins, and meadows. It is an annual herb growing a mostly erect, branching stem to exceed 30 centimeters in height. The oppositely arranged leaves vary in size and shape, from lance-shaped to oval, toothed or not, and under one to over three centimeters long. Flowers emerge from upper leaf axils. Each has a calyx of five narrow, linear sepals. The tubular corolla is up to a centimeter long, white in color with a blue or purple tint, and lipped at the mouth, the lower lip with three rounded lobes. The fruit is a capsule containing yellow seeds.
