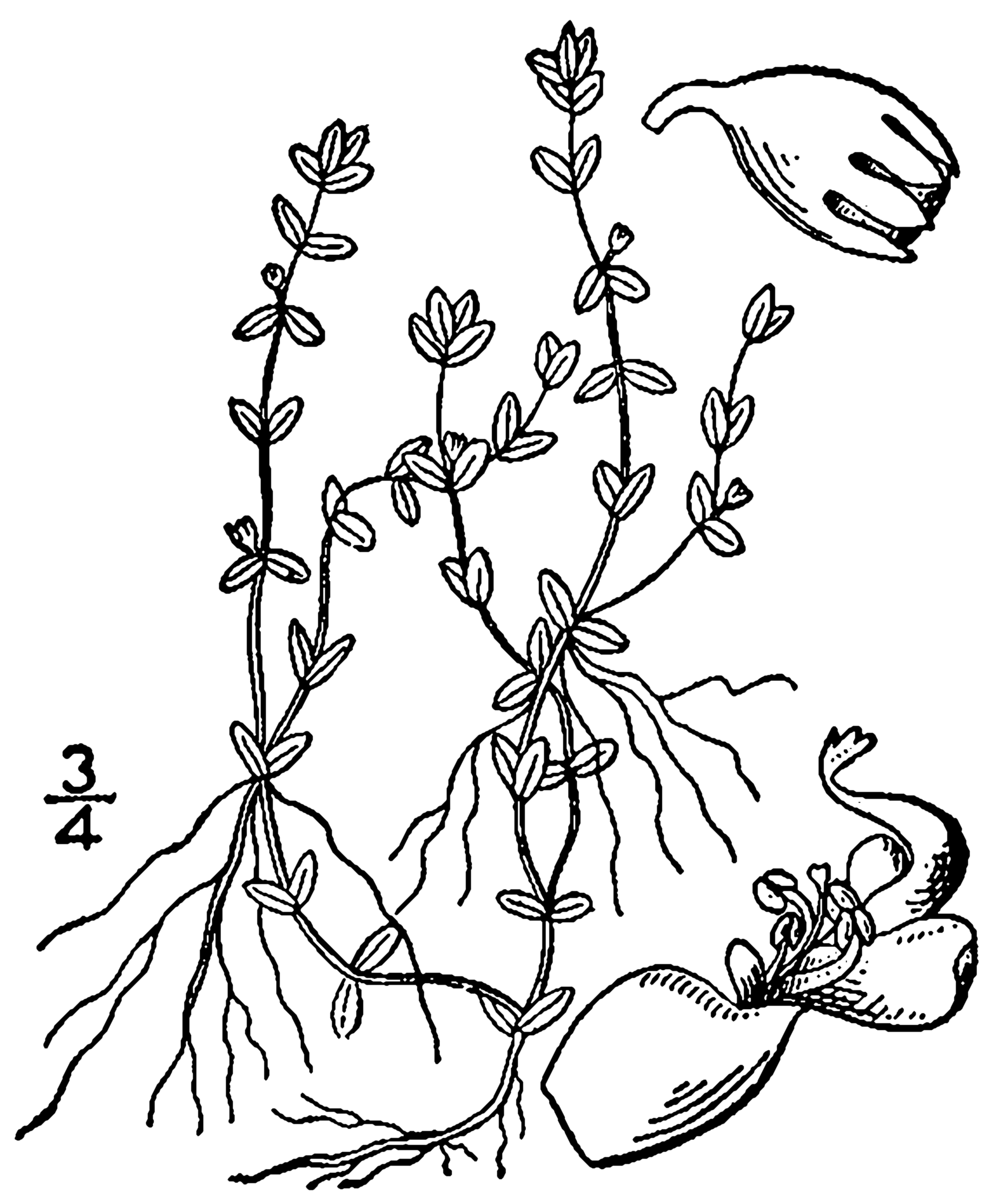

Conservation status
- Possibly Extinct (NatureServe)

Scientific classification
- Kingdom: Plantae
- Clade: Embryophytes
- Clade: Tracheophytes
- Clade: Spermatophytes
- Clade: Angiosperms
- Clade: Eudicots
- Clade: Asterids
- Order: Lamiales
- Family: Linderniaceae
- Genus: Micranthemum
- Species: M. micranthemoides

Binomial name
- Micranthemum micranthemoides Wettst.

Synonyms
- Synonymy: Globifera micranthemoides Kuntze; Hemianthus micranthemoides Nutt.; Hemianthus micranthus (Pursh) Pennell; Micranthemum micrantha (Pursh) Alph.Wood; Micranthemum nuttallii A.Gray; Herpestis micrantha Pursh; Herpestis micrantha Elliott

= Micranthemum micranthemoides =

Species of aquatic plant

Micranthemum micranthemoides (syn. Hemianthus micranthemoides), commonly known as Nuttall's mudflower is an extinct species of subaquatic Micranthemum that previously inhabited wet areas from Virginia to New York. In the aquascaping trade, Micranthemum glomeratum is commonly misidentified as this plant.

== Description ==
Micranthemum micranthemoides was a small subaquatic glabrous annual that exhibited creeping stems and ascending branches. Micranthemum micranthemoides grew 5-20 cm in height. Micranthemum micranthemoides had opposite, elliptic leaves measuring 2–5 mm. Leaves were entire. Flowers were both solitary and axillary. Each flower's corolla was white and measured 2 mm. Flowers contained two stamens, which were inserted around the corolla's throat. Micranthemum micranthemoides flowered from September to October. Its seeds were oblong to narrowly obconic.

== Distribution and habitat ==
Micranthemum micranthemoides previously occurred in the Mid-Atlantic region of the United States. It grew in wet areas from Virginia to New York. Before its extinction, it was a rare occurrence in tidal mudflats and in the intertidal zone of river estuaries. It is said to have been highly specialized to these habitats. Micranthemum micranthemoides grew in sandy and gravelly substrates. It was last seen on 13 September 1941 by Fernald & Long. It was found growing in the intertidal portions of the Delaware, Pocomoke, Wicomico, Potomac, Anacostia, Chickahominy, and Hudson rivers. It is restricted to freshwater estuarine shores due indicating an intolerance to salinity.

The name Micranthemum micranthemoides was previously attributed to a larger species concept, including plants from the Northeast, Southeast and West Indies, but has since been split into distinct entities.

== Misidentification ==
Plants labeled Micranthemum micranthemoides or Hemianthus micranthemoides are commonly sold in aquascaping as "pearlweed", but are not truly of this species. When examined, these plants sold as pearlweed were actually of a similar species, Micranthemum glomeratum, which is native to Florida. This misidentification was confirmed by Academy of Natural Sciences Botany Curator Emeritus Ernie Schuyler when the aquascaping plants were compared to herbarium specimens and descriptions of Micranthemum micranthemoides. Micranthemum micranthemoides probably has never been cultivated as an aquarium plant.
