= Vandellia =

Vandellia may refer to:

- Vandellia (fish), a genus of fishes in the family Trichomycteridae
- Vandellia (plant), a genus of plants in the family Linderniaceae
