= Hemiarrhena =

Scientific classification
- Kingdom: Plantae
- Clade: Tracheophytes
- Clade: Angiosperms
- Clade: Eudicots
- Clade: Asterids
- Order: Lamiales
- Family: Linderniaceae
- Genus: Hemiarrhena; Benth.
- Species: H. plantaginea

Binomial name
- Hemiarrhena plantaginea (F.Muell.) Benth.

Genus of plants

Hemiarrhena is a monotypic genus of flowering plants belonging to the family Linderniaceae. The only species is Hemiarrhena plantaginea.

Its native range is Northern Australia.
