= Picria =

Scientific classification
- Kingdom: Plantae
- Clade: Tracheophytes
- Clade: Angiosperms
- Clade: Eudicots
- Clade: Asterids
- Order: Lamiales
- Family: Linderniaceae
- Genus: Picria; Lour. (1790)
- Species: P. fel-terrae

Binomial name
- Picria fel-terrae Lour. (1790)

Synonyms
- Curanga Juss. (1804); Synphyllium Griff. (1836); Treisteria Griff. (1854); Curanga amara Juss. (1804); Curanga fel-terrae (Lour.) Merr. (1917); Curanga melissifolia A.Juss. (1807); Curanga torenioides Steud. (1840); Gratiola amara (Juss.) Roxb. (1814); Herpestis amara Benth. (1835); Synphyllium torenioides Griff. (1836); Treisteria assamica Griff. (1854)

Genus of plants

Picria fel-terrae is a species of flowering plant belonging to the family Linderniaceae. It is the sole species in genus Picria..

It is an annual native to the eastern Himalaya, Indochina, southern China, Peninsular Malaysia, the Philippines, and Kosrae in the Caroline Islands.
