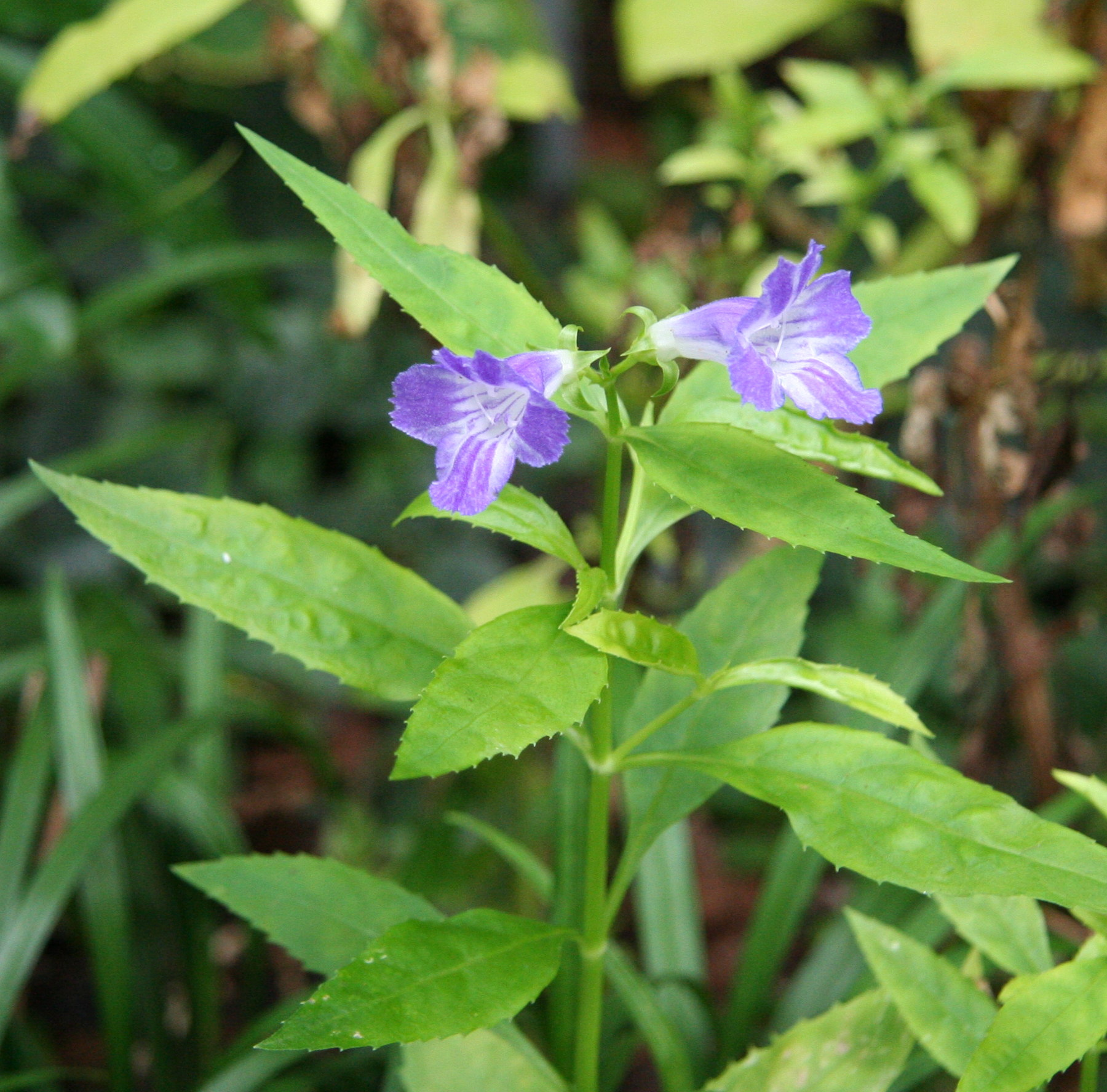
- Artanema fimbriatum

Scientific classification
- Kingdom: Plantae
- Clade: Tracheophytes
- Clade: Angiosperms
- Clade: Eudicots
- Clade: Asterids
- Order: Lamiales
- Family: Linderniaceae
- Genus: Artanema; D.Don

Synonyms
- Bahel Adans.; Bahelia Kuntze; Diceros Pers.; Ourisianthus Bonati

= Artanema =

Genus of flowering plants

Artanema is a small genus of flowering plants in the family Linderniaceae. It was formerly included in the Plantaginaceae, but reclassified based on genetic evidence.

== Species ==
Three species are accepted.

- Artanema bantamense Backer
- Artanema fimbriatum (Hook. ex Graham) D.Don
- Artanema longifolium (L.) Vatke
