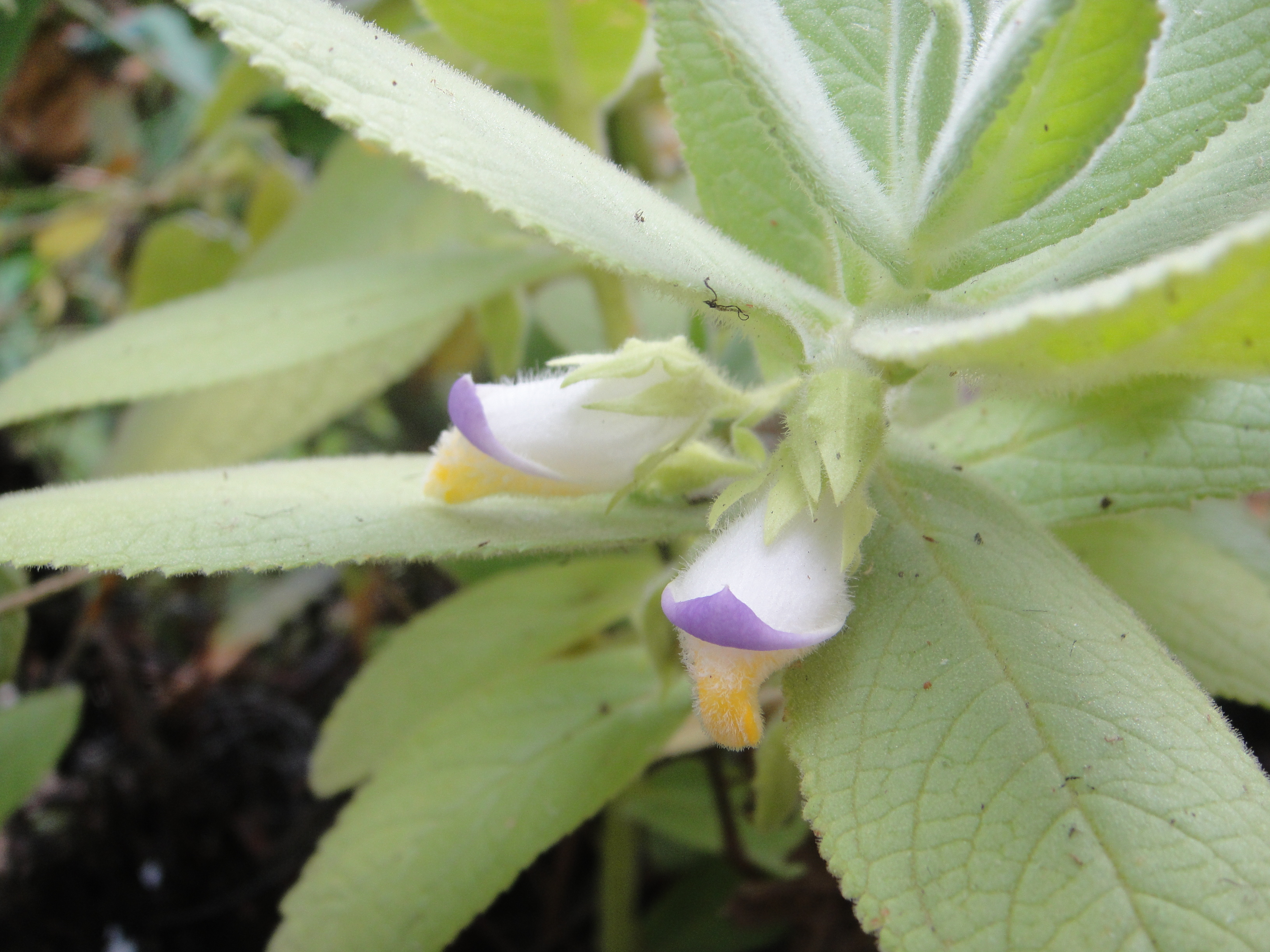

Scientific classification
- Kingdom: Plantae
- Clade: Tracheophytes
- Clade: Angiosperms
- Clade: Eudicots
- Clade: Asterids
- Order: Lamiales
- Family: Linderniaceae
- Genus: Isabelcristinia; L.P.Felix, Christenh. & E.M.Almeida
- Species: I. aromatica

Binomial name
- Isabelcristinia aromatica L.P.Felix & E.M.Almeida

= Isabelcristinia =

Genus of shrubs

Isabelcristinia is a genus of shrubs in the family Linderniaceae containing a single species, Isabelcristinia aromatica. It grows on rocky outcrops called inselbergs in north-eastern Brazil in the state of Pernambuco. It has upright branches with gland-covered leaves that are aromatic to the touch. It has bilabiate flowers with a yellow lower and a pink upper lip and is likely pollinated by large bees. The genus is closely related to Ameroglossum, which is found in similar habitats, but has flowers pollinated by hummingbirds. The species is considered Endangered, because it has very little recruitment of new plants and the area where it is found is not protected and under pressure from human and feral animal disturbance.
