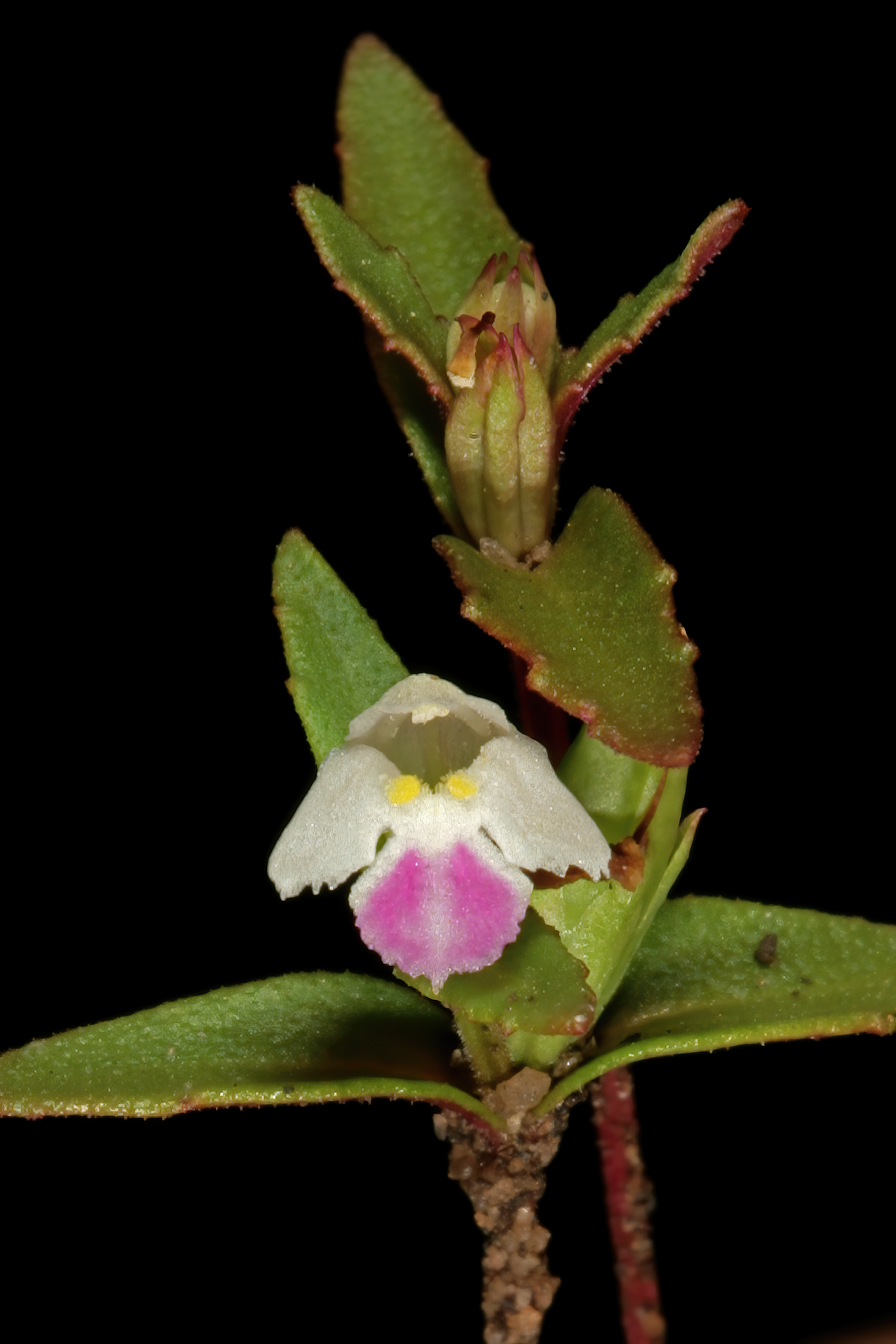
- Linderniella wilmsii in South Africa

Scientific classification
- Kingdom: Plantae
- Clade: Tracheophytes
- Clade: Angiosperms
- Clade: Eudicots
- Clade: Asterids
- Order: Lamiales
- Family: Linderniaceae
- Genus: Linderniella; Eb.Fisch., Schäferh. & Kai Müll.

= Linderniella =

Genus of flowering plant

Linderniella is a genus of flowering plants belonging to the family Linderniaceae.

Its native range is Tropical and southern Africa. It is found in the countries of Angola, Benin, Burkina, Burundi, Cameroon, Central African Republic, Chad, Congo, Eswatini, Ethiopia, Ghana, Guinea, Guinea-Bissau, Ivory Coast, Kenya, Liberia, Madagascar, Malawi, Mali, Mozambique, Namibia, Niger, Nigeria, Rwanda, Senegal, Sierra Leone, South Africa (Free State, KwaZulu-Natal and Northern Provinces), Sudan, Tanzania, Togo, Uganda, Zambia, and Zimbabwe.

The genus name of Linderniella is in honour of Franz Balthasar von Lindern (1682–1755), French doctor and botanist in Strasbourg and also university botanical garden director. It was first described and published in Willdenowia Vol.43 on page 227 in 2013.

== Known species ==
According to Kew:

- Linderniella andongensis (Hiern) Eb.Fisch., Schäferh. & Kai Müll.
- Linderniella bolusii (Hiern) Eb.Fisch., Schäferh. & Kai Müll.
- Linderniella boutiqueana (R.Germ.) Eb.Fisch., Schäferh. & Kai Müll.
- Linderniella brevidens (Skan) Eb.Fisch., Schäferh. & Kai Müll.
- Linderniella cerastioides (Bonati) Eb.Fisch., Schäferh. & Kai Müll.
- Linderniella gracilis (Skan) Eb.Fisch., Schäferh. & Kai Müll.
- Linderniella hartlii (Eb.Fisch. & Hepper) Eb.Fisch., Schäferh. & Kai Müll.
- Linderniella horombensis (Eb.Fisch.) Eb.Fisch., Schäferh. & Kai Müll.
- Linderniella mbalaensis (Eb.Fisch.) Eb.Fisch., Schäferh. & Kai Müll.
- Linderniella nana (Engl.) Eb.Fisch., Schäferh. & Kai Müll.
- Linderniella pulchella (Skan) Eb.Fisch., Schäferh. & Kai Müll.
- Linderniella pusilla (Urb.) Eb.Fisch., Schäferh. & Kai Müll.
- Linderniella pygmaea (Bonati) Eb.Fisch., Schäferh. & Kai Müll.
- Linderniella trichotoma (Oliv.) Eb.Fisch., Schäferh. & Kai Müll.
- Linderniella ugandensis (Skan) Eb.Fisch., Schäferh. & Kai Müll.
- Linderniella wilmsii (Engl.) Eb.Fisch., Schäferh. & Kai Müll.
