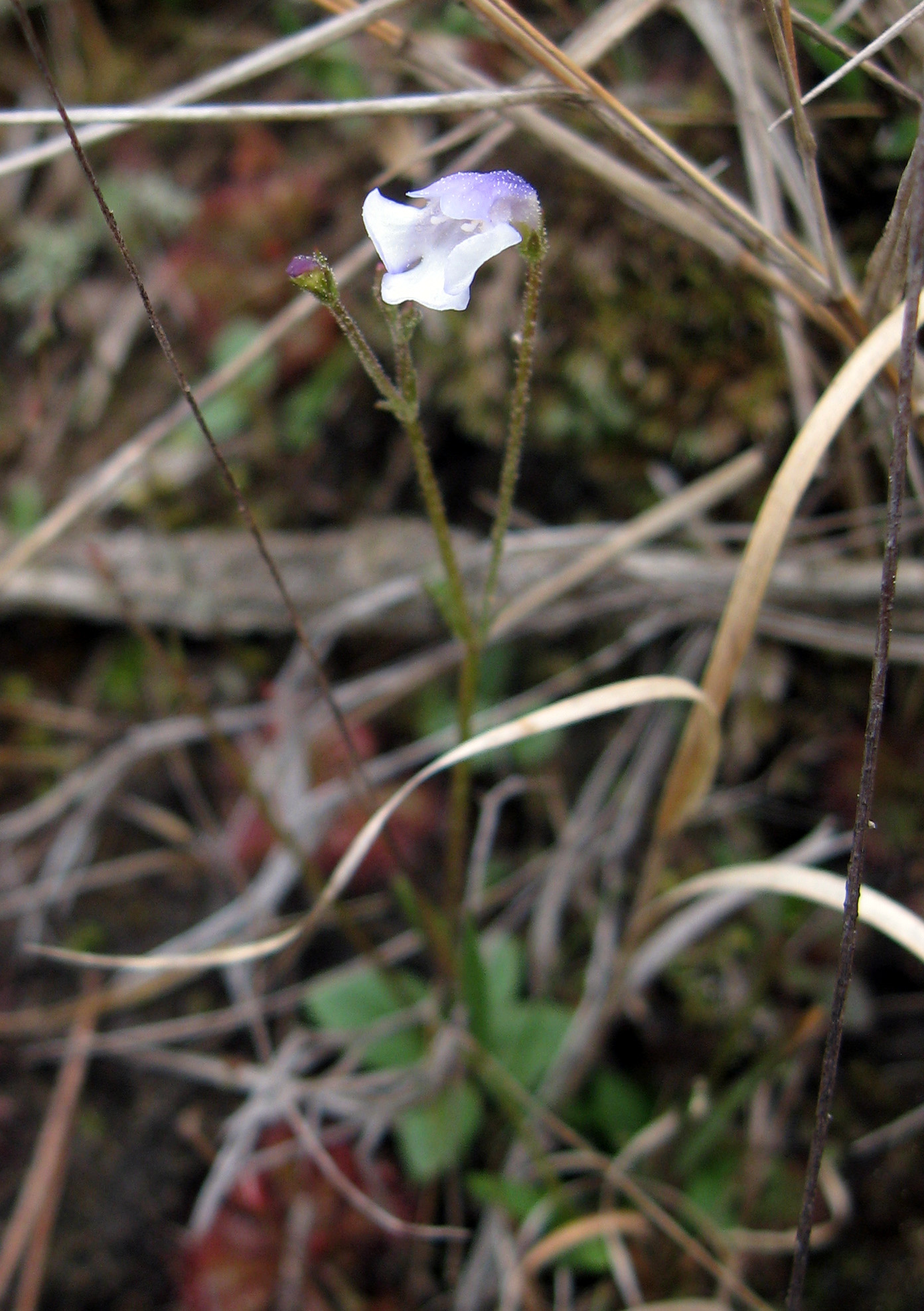
- Lindernia monticola

Scientific classification
- Kingdom: Plantae
- Clade: Tracheophytes
- Clade: Angiosperms
- Clade: Eudicots
- Clade: Asterids
- Order: Lamiales
- Family: Linderniaceae
- Genus: Lindernia; Allioni

Synonyms
- List: Bazina Raf.; Bryodes Benth.; Chamaegigas Dinter ex Heil; Diceros Blume (for the rhinoceros, see Diceros.); Geoffraya Bonati; Ilysanthes Raf.; Psammetes Hepper; Pyxidaria Kuntze; Virchowia Schenk

= Lindernia =

Genus of flowering plants

The genus Lindernia is a group of plants in the family Linderniaceae. They are native to warm regions in both the Eastern and Western Hemisphere.

The genus name of Lindernia is in honour of Franz Balthasar von Lindern (1682–1755), French doctor and botanist in Strasbourg and also university botanical garden director.

Lindernia consists of 30 species in its most recent circumscription. Some species have become available commercially for use in home aquariums and aquascaping, such as L. rotundifolia.

== Species ==
The following species are recognised in the genus Lindernia:

- Lindernia acrandra W.R.Barker
- Lindernia adami-hefiedii Eb.Fisch.
- Lindernia alsinoides R.Br.
- Lindernia alterniflora (C.Wright) Alain
- Lindernia atrata W.R.Barker
- Lindernia barkeri Wannan
- Lindernia barthlottii Eb.Fisch., Andriant. & Sieder
- Lindernia beasleyi Wannan
- Lindernia benthamii Eb.Fisch., Schäferh. & Kai Müll.
- Lindernia brachyphylla Pennell
- Lindernia brennanii W.R.Barker
- Lindernia bryoides Eb.Fisch.
- Lindernia calliandra W.R.Barker
- Lindernia capensis Thunb.
- Lindernia conferta (Hiern) Philcox
- Lindernia congesta (A.Raynal) Eb.Fisch.
- Lindernia cyanoplectra W.R.Barker
- Lindernia dierythra W.R.Barker
- Lindernia dubia (L.) Pennell
- Lindernia dunlopii W.R.Barker
- Lindernia enypniastina W.R.Barker
- Lindernia grandiflora Nutt.
- Lindernia hyssopioides (L.) Haines
- Lindernia intrepida (Dinter ex Heil) Oberm.
- Lindernia jiuhuanica X.H.Guo & X.L.Liu
- Lindernia lemuriana Eb.Fisch., Schäferh. & Kai Müll.
- Lindernia leucochroa W.R.Barker
- Lindernia linearifolia (Engl.) Eb.Fisch.
- Lindernia lucrusmiana W.R.Barker
- Lindernia madagascariensis (Bonati) Eb.Fisch., Schäferh. & Kai Müll.
- Lindernia madayiparensis Ratheesh, Sunil & Nandakumar
- Lindernia manilaliana Sivar.
- Lindernia mexicana (S.Watson) T.Yamaz.
- Lindernia microcalyx Pennell & Stehlé
- Lindernia minima (Benth.) Mukerjee
- Lindernia mitrasacmoides (O.Schwarz) W.R.Barker
- Lindernia monroi (S.Moore) Eb.Fisch.
- Lindernia monticola Nutt.
- Lindernia multicaulis (Urb.) Alain
- Lindernia multiflora (Roxb.) Mukerjee
- Lindernia murfetiana W.R.Barker
- Lindernia natans Eb.Fisch.
- Lindernia oblongifolia (Baker) Eb.Fisch.
- Lindernia parviflora (Roxb.) Haines
- Lindernia petrensis W.R.Barker
- Lindernia porphyrodinea W.R.Barker & M.D.Barrett
- Lindernia procumbens (Krock.) Philcox
- Lindernia prolata W.R.Barker
- Lindernia pronanthera W.R.Barker
- Lindernia pubescens (Benth.) F.Muell.
- Lindernia pustulosa W.R.Barker
- Lindernia robyniae W.R.Barker
- Lindernia rotundata (Pilg.) Eb.Fisch.
- Lindernia rotundifolia (L.) Alston
- Lindernia sallyae Eb.Fisch., Vollesen & I.Darbysh.
- Lindernia sandaiolingensis S.S.Ying
- Lindernia scopularis W.R.Barker
- Lindernia scutella W.R.Barker
- Lindernia srilankana L.H.Cramer & Philcox
- Lindernia stantonii Wannan
- Lindernia tamilnadensis M.G.Prasad & Sunojk.
- Lindernia thyridostoma W.R.Barker
- Lindernia tiwiensis W.R.Barker
- Lindernia tridentata (Small) D.Q.Lewis
- Lindernia venustula W.R.Barker
- Lindernia viguieri (Bonati) Eb.Fisch.
- Lindernia yarun Wannan
