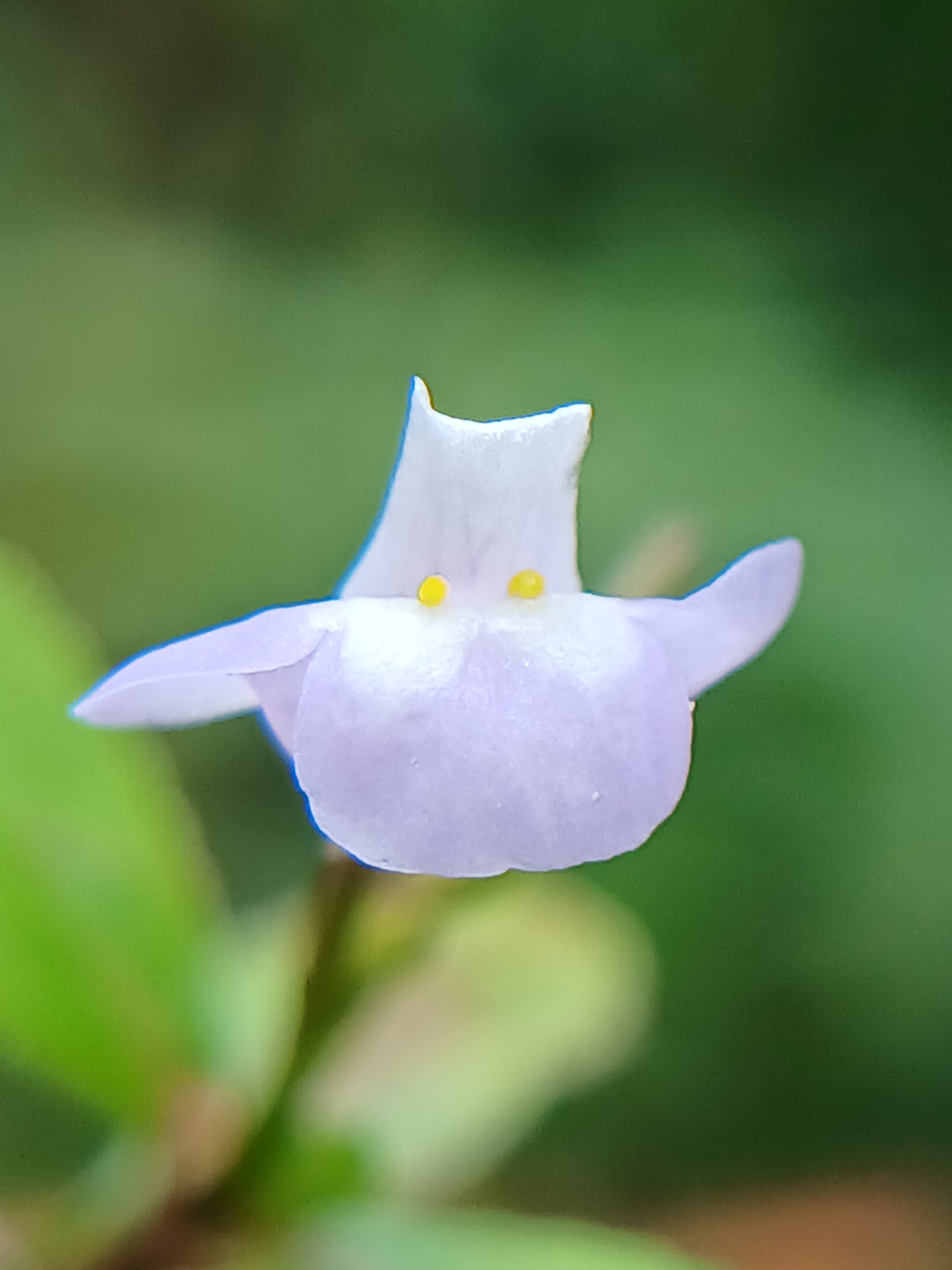
- Bonnaya antipoda

Scientific classification
- Kingdom: Plantae
- Clade: Tracheophytes
- Clade: Angiosperms
- Clade: Eudicots
- Clade: Asterids
- Order: Lamiales
- Family: Linderniaceae
- Genus: Bonnaya; Link & Otto

= Bonnaya =

Genus of flowering plants

Bonnaya is a genus of flowering plants belonging to the family Linderniaceae.

Its native range is Eastern Tropical Africa, Madagascar, Tropical and Subtropical Asia to Northern Australia.

Species:

- Bonnaya aculeata (Bonati) Eb.Fisch., Schäferh. & Kai Müll.
- Bonnaya antipoda (L.) Druce
- Bonnaya cephalantha (T.Yamaz.) Eb.Fisch., Schäferh. & Kai Müll.
- Bonnaya ciliata (Colsm.) Spreng.
- Bonnaya cowiei (W.R.Barker) Y.S.Liang & J.C.Wang
- Bonnaya milindii Shimpale & V.A.Sardesai
- Bonnaya multiflora Bonati
- Bonnaya oppositifolia (Retz.) Spreng.
- Bonnaya peduncularis Benth.
- Bonnaya ruellioides (Colsm.) Spreng.
- Bonnaya sanpabloensis Y.S.Liang & J.C.Wang
- Bonnaya succosa (Kerr ex Barnett) Eb.Fisch., Schäferh. & Kai Müll.
- Bonnaya tenuifolia (Colsm.) Spreng.
- Bonnaya veronicifolia (Retz.) Spreng.
- Bonnaya zanzibarica (Eb.Fisch. & Hepper) Eb.Fisch., Schäferh. & Kai Müll.
