= Hartliella =

Scientific classification
- Kingdom: Plantae
- Clade: Tracheophytes
- Clade: Angiosperms
- Clade: Eudicots
- Clade: Asterids
- Order: Lamiales
- Family: Linderniaceae
- Genus: Hartliella; Eb.Fisch.

Genus of flowering plants

Hartliella is a genus of flowering plants belonging to the family Linderniaceae.

Its native range is southern Democratic Republic of the Congo.

== General description ==
Perennial plants with large sub-terraneous woody rhizomes growing on heavy metal soils. Leaves are largely ovoid, leathery and have a somewhat shining appearance. The lower lip of corolla (petals of the flower) is lacking yellow club-shaped hairs with pluricellular (many cells) base. The filament (stalk) of abaxial (facing away) stamens only weakly curved with a small basal knee-like append-age present or absent.

== Taxonomy ==
The genus name of Hartliella is in honour of Dimitri Hartl (1926–2015), a German botanist, professor at the University of Mainz and worked on Scrophulariaceae family. It was first described and published in Trop. Subtrop. Pflanzenwelt Vol.81 on page 204 in 1992.

Known species, according to Kew:

- Hartliella bampsii (Eb.Fisch.) Eb.Fisch.
- Hartliella capitata (Eb.Fisch.) Eb.Fisch.
- Hartliella cupricola Eb.Fisch.
- Hartliella suffruticosa (Lisowski & Mielcarek) Eb.Fisch.

== Other sources ==
- Énum. Pl. Fleurs Afr. Trop. 4: 431 (1997)
