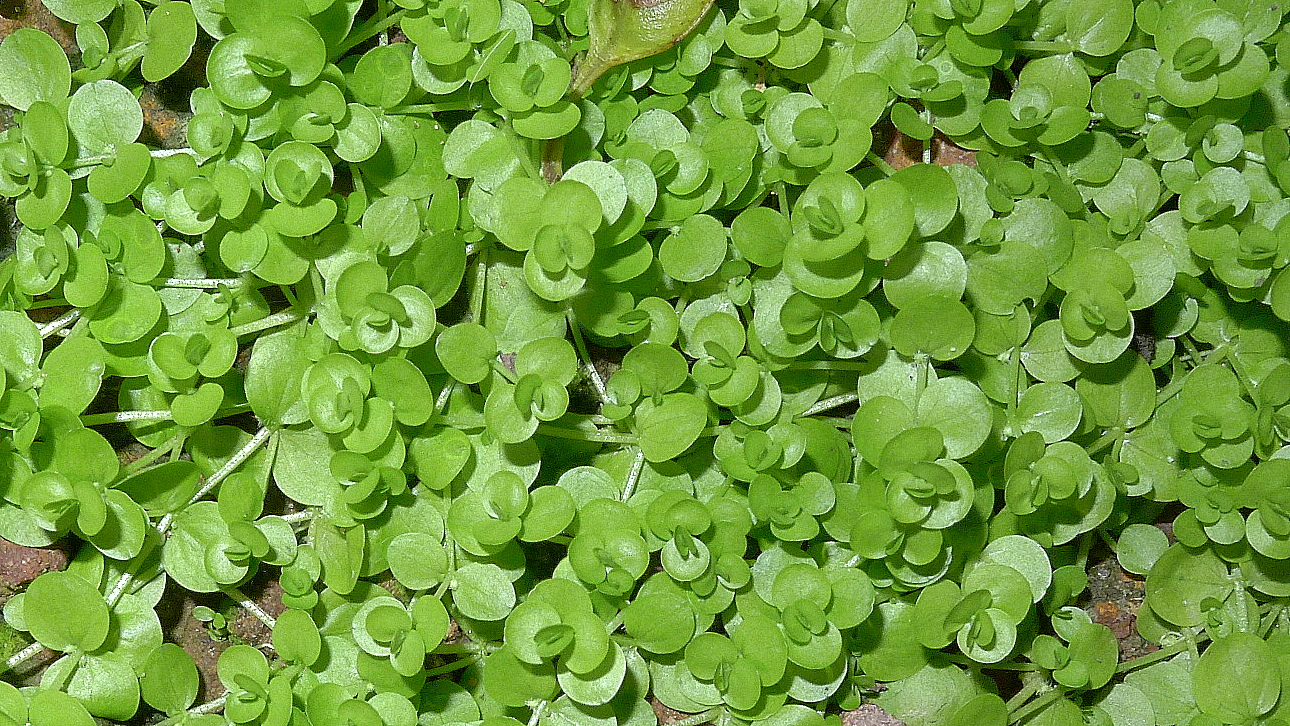

Scientific classification
- Kingdom: Plantae
- Clade: Tracheophytes
- Clade: Angiosperms
- Clade: Eudicots
- Clade: Asterids
- Order: Lamiales
- Family: Linderniaceae
- Genus: Micranthemum; Michx.

= Micranthemum =

Genus of plants

Micranthemum is a genus of flowering plants belonging to the family Linderniaceae.

Its native range is Eastern USA to Tropical and Subtropical America.

== Species ==
Species:

- Micranthemum arenarioides (Griseb.) M.Gómez
- Micranthemum bryoides (Griseb.) M.Gómez
- Micranthemum callitrichoides (Griseb.) C.Wright
- Micranthemum erosum (Griseb.) Eb.Fisch., Schäferh. & Kai Müll.
- Micranthemum glomeratum (Chapm.) Shinners
- Micranthemum longipes (Urb.) Acev.-Rodr.
- Micranthemum micranthemoides Wettst.
- Micranthemum procerorum L.O.Williams
- Micranthemum reflexum (C.Wright ex Griseb.) C.Wright
- Micranthemum rotundatum Griseb.
- Micranthemum standleyi L.O.Williams
- Micranthemum tetrandrum C.Wright
- Micranthemum umbrosum (J.F.Gmel.) S.F.Blake
