= Pierranthus =

Scientific classification
- Kingdom: Plantae
- Clade: Tracheophytes
- Clade: Angiosperms
- Clade: Eudicots
- Clade: Asterids
- Order: Lamiales
- Family: Linderniaceae
- Genus: Pierranthus; Bonati
- Species: P. capitatus

Binomial name
- Pierranthus capitatus (Bonati) Bonati

Synonyms
- Vandellia capitata Bonati; Delpya capitata (Bonati) Bonati; Delpya cochinchinensis Pierre ex Bonati

Species of flowering plant

Pierranthus is a monotypic genus of flowering plants belonging to the family Linderniaceae. The only known species is Pierranthus capitatus (Bonati) Bonati.

Its native range is Indo-China and it is found in Cambodia, Thailand and Vietnam.

The genus name of Pierranthus is in honour of Jean Baptiste Louis Pierre (1833–1905), a French botanist known for his Asian studies. The genus has one known synonym of Delpya Pierre ex Bonati. The Latin specific epithet of capitatus is derived from capitate meaning having dense-headed growth. Both the genus and the species were first described and published in Bull. Soc. Bot. Genève, séries 2, Vol.4 n page 254 in 1912.
