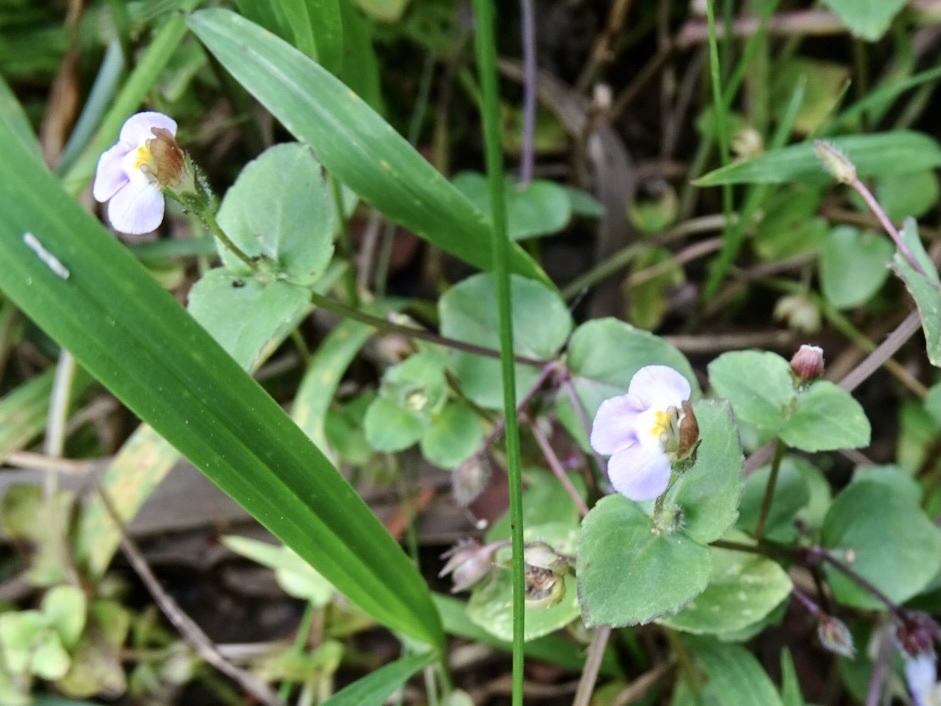
- Yamazakia pusilla

Scientific classification
- Kingdom: Plantae
- Clade: Tracheophytes
- Clade: Angiosperms
- Clade: Eudicots
- Clade: Asterids
- Order: Lamiales
- Family: Linderniaceae
- Genus: Yamazakia; W.R.Barker, Y.S.Liang & Wannan

= Yamazakia =

Genus of flowering plants

Yamazakia is a genus of flowering plants belonging to the family Linderniaceae.

Its native range is from tropical and subtropical Asia to northern Australia.

Species:

- Yamazakia pusilla (Willd.) W.R.Barker, Y.S.Liang & Wannan
- Yamazakia viscosa (Hornem.) W.R.Barker, Y.S.Liang & Wannan
