= Crepidorhopalon =

Scientific classification
- Kingdom: Plantae
- Clade: Tracheophytes
- Clade: Angiosperms
- Clade: Eudicots
- Clade: Asterids
- Order: Lamiales
- Family: Linderniaceae
- Genus: Crepidorhopalon; Eb.Fisch.

Genus of flowering plants

Crepidorhopalon is a genus of flowering plants belonging to the family Linderniaceae.

Its native range is Tropical and Southern Africa, Madagascar.

Species:

- Crepidorhopalon affinis (De Wild.) Eb.Fisch. ex Govaerts
- Crepidorhopalon alatocalycinus Eb.Fisch.
- Crepidorhopalon bifolius (Skan) Eb.Fisch.
- Crepidorhopalon chironioides (S.Moore) Eb.Fisch.
- Crepidorhopalon debilis (Skan) Eb.Fisch.
- Crepidorhopalon flavus (S.Moore) I.Darbysh. & Eb.Fisch.
- Crepidorhopalon goetzei (Engl.) Eb.Fisch.
- Crepidorhopalon gracilis (Pilg.) Eb.Fisch.
- Crepidorhopalon hartlii Eb.Fisch.
- Crepidorhopalon hepperi Eb.Fisch.
- Crepidorhopalon involucratus (Philcox) Eb.Fisch.
- Crepidorhopalon kwaleensis I.Darbysh. & Eb.Fisch.
- Crepidorhopalon latibracteatus (Skan) Eb.Fisch.
- Crepidorhopalon laxiflorus Eb.Fisch.
- Crepidorhopalon malaissei Eb.Fisch.
- Crepidorhopalon manganicola Eb.Fisch.
- Crepidorhopalon membranocalycinus Eb.Fisch.
- Crepidorhopalon microcarpaeoides (Bonati) Eb.Fisch.
- Crepidorhopalon mutinondoensis Eb.Fisch. & I.Darbysh.
- Crepidorhopalon namuliensis I.Darbysh. & Eb.Fisch.
- Crepidorhopalon parviflorus (Philcox) Eb.Fisch.
- Crepidorhopalon perennis (P.A.Duvign.) Eb.Fisch.
- Crepidorhopalon robynsii Eb.Fisch.
- Crepidorhopalon rupestris (Engl.) Eb.Fisch.
- Crepidorhopalon scaettae (Staner) Eb.Fisch.
- Crepidorhopalon schweinfurthii (Oliv.) Eb.Fisch.
- Crepidorhopalon spicatus (Engl.) Eb.Fisch.
- Crepidorhopalon symoensii Eb.Fisch.
- Crepidorhopalon tenuifolius (Philcox) Eb.Fisch.
- Crepidorhopalon tenuis (S.Moore) Eb.Fisch.
- Crepidorhopalon uvens (Hiern) Eb.Fisch.
- Crepidorhopalon welwitschii (Engl.) Eb.Fisch.
- Crepidorhopalon whytei (Skan) Eb.Fisch.
