= Bampsia =

Scientific classification
- Kingdom: Plantae
- Clade: Tracheophytes
- Clade: Angiosperms
- Clade: Eudicots
- Clade: Asterids
- Order: Lamiales
- Family: Linderniaceae
- Genus: Bampsia; Lisowski & Mielcarek

Genus of flowering plants

Bampsia is a genus of flowering plant belonging to the family Linderniaceae.

Its native range is Democratic Republic of the Congo.

Species:

- Bampsia lawalreeana Lisowski & Mielcarek
- Bampsia symoensiana Lisowski & Mielcarek
