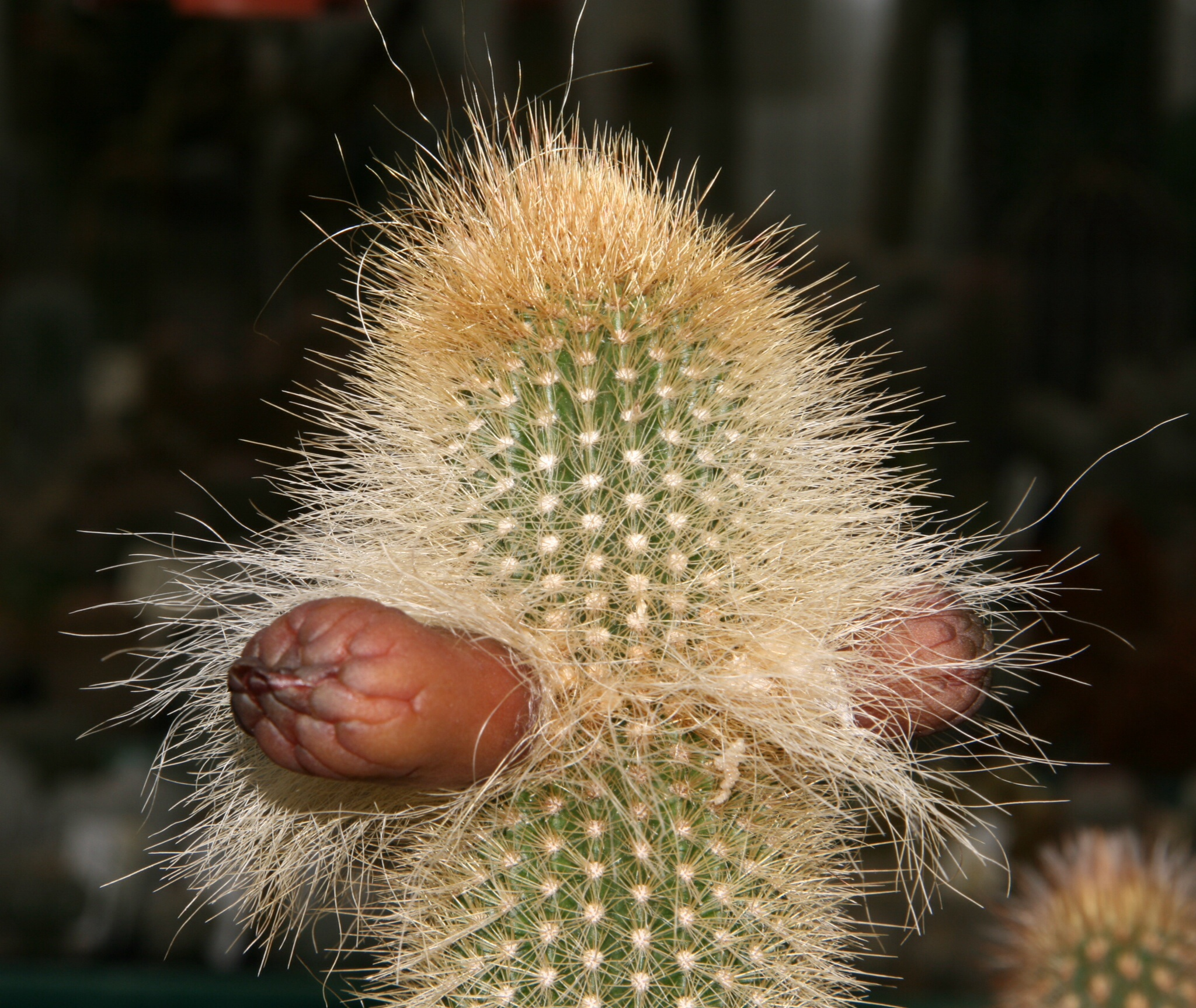

Scientific classification
- Kingdom: Plantae
- Clade: Tracheophytes
- Clade: Angiosperms
- Clade: Eudicots
- Order: Caryophyllales
- Family: Cactaceae
- Subfamily: Cactoideae
- Genus: Pilosocereus
- Species: P. chrysostele

Binomial name
- Pilosocereus chrysostele (Vaupel) Byles & G.D. Rowley 1957

= Pilosocereus chrysostele =

Species of cactus

Pilosocereus chrysostele is a species of Pilosocereus found in Brazil

== Subspecies ==
| Image | Name | Distribution |
|---|---|---|
| | Pilosocereus chrysostele subsp. chrysostele | Brazil (Ceara) |
| | Pilosocereus chrysostele subsp. cearensis P.J.Braun & Esteves | N.E. Brazil |

Pilosocereus catimbauensis was once considered a subspecies of Pilosocereus chrysostele.
