= Catimbaua =

Scientific classification
- Kingdom: Plantae
- Clade: Tracheophytes
- Clade: Angiosperms
- Clade: Eudicots
- Clade: Asterids
- Order: Lamiales
- Family: Linderniaceae
- Genus: Catimbaua; L.P.Felix, Christenh. & E.M.Almeida
- Species: C. pendula

Binomial name
- Catimbaua pendula L.P.Felix & E.M.Almeida

Genus of shrubs

Catimbaua is a genus of shrubs in the family Linderniaceae. It contains a single species, Catimbaua pendula. It has pendant branches, greyish leaves and red flowers. The species occurs on steep cliffs in the Catimbau National Park in Pernambuco, north-eastern Brazil. It is closely related to Ameroglossum
