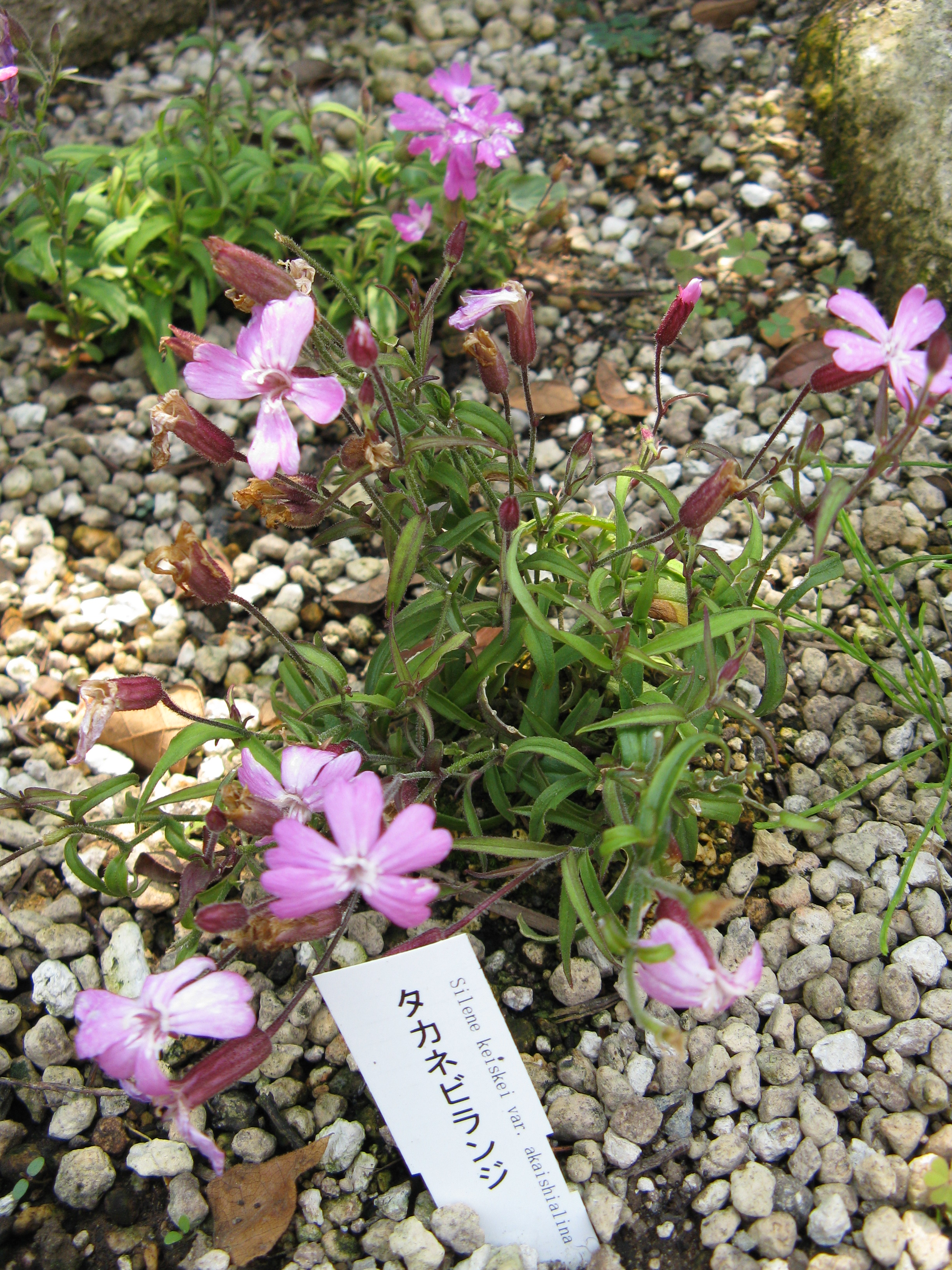

Scientific classification
- Kingdom: Plantae
- Clade: Tracheophytes
- Clade: Angiosperms
- Clade: Eudicots
- Order: Caryophyllales
- Family: Caryophyllaceae
- Genus: Silene
- Species: S. keiskei

Binomial name
- Silene keiskei Miq.

Synonyms
- Melandrium keiskei (Miq.) Ohwi; Silene keiskei f. albescens (Takeda)

= Silene keiskei =

Japanese flowering plant

Silene keiskei is a species of flowering plant in the family Caryophyllaceae. The species is native to Japan (Honshu). It grows in temperate climates and in the high mountains.

The species was first described and the name by Friedrich Anton Wilhelm Miquel but in 1936 it was reclassified by Jisaburo Ohwi. Plants in this species can grow up to 10 to 30 cm.

== Subspecies ==
subspecies include:

- Silene keiskei f. albescens
- Silene keiskei var. minor
- Silene keiskei f. procumbens
