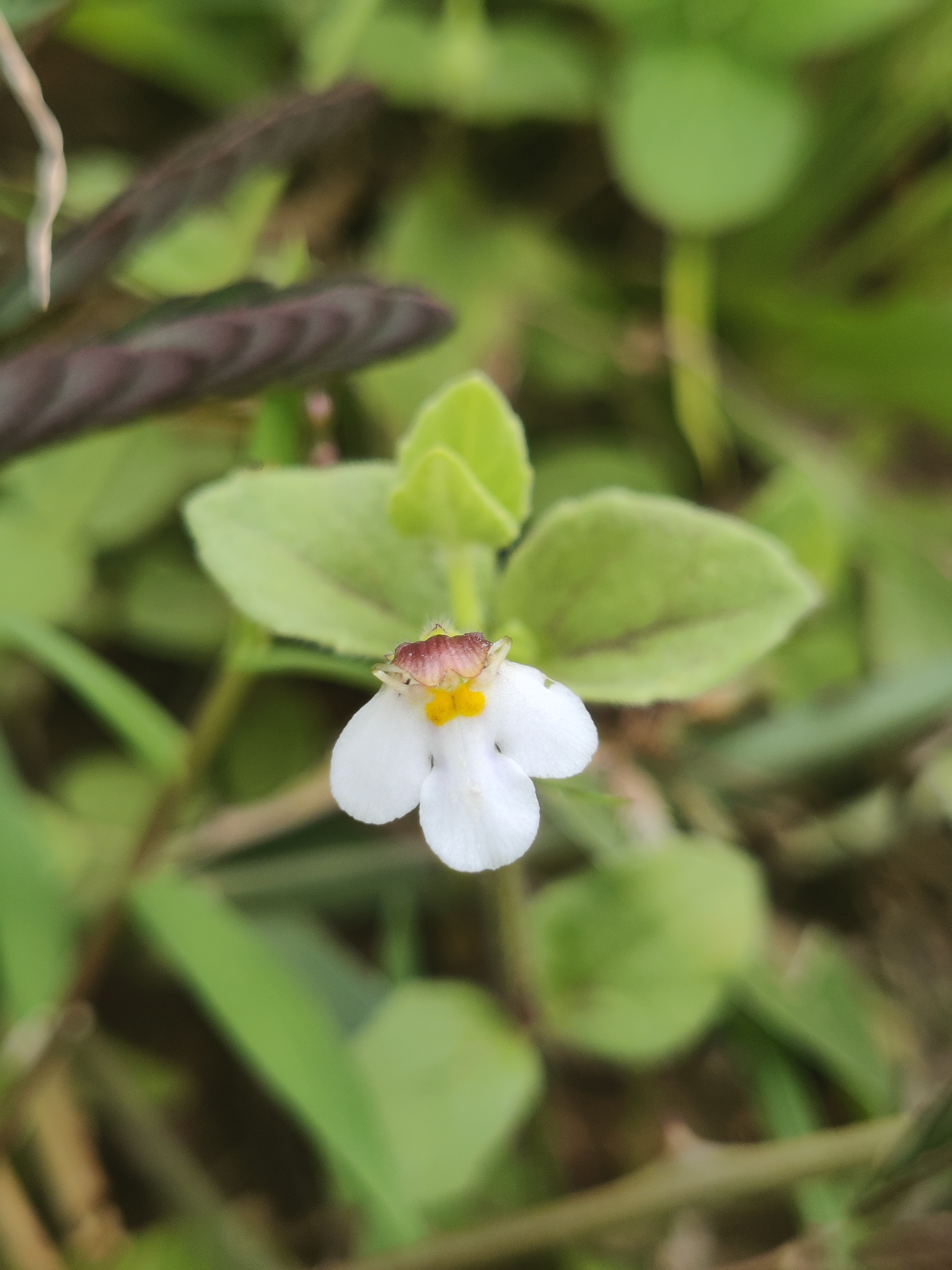
- Vandellia diffusa

Scientific classification
- Kingdom: Plantae
- Clade: Tracheophytes
- Clade: Angiosperms
- Clade: Eudicots
- Clade: Asterids
- Order: Lamiales
- Family: Linderniaceae
- Genus: Vandellia; L.

= Vandellia (plant) =

Genus of flowering plants

Vandellia is a genus of flowering plants belonging to the family Linderniaceae. It comprises about 52 species.

== Species ==
The following species are recognized in this genus:

- Vandellia annamensis (T.Yamaz.) Eb.Fisch., Schäferh. & Kai Müll.
- Vandellia aplectra (W.R.Barker) Eb.Fisch., Schäferh. & Kai Müll.
- Vandellia brevipedunculata (Migo) T.Yamaz.
- Vandellia brucei (R.A.Howard) Eb.Fisch., Schäferh. & Kai Müll.
- Vandellia cambodgiana (Bonati) Eb.Fisch., Schäferh. & Kai Müll.
- Vandellia cerastoides Collett & Hemsl.
- Vandellia chrysoplectra (W.R.Barker) Eb.Fisch., Schäferh. & Kai Müll.
- Vandellia clausa F.Muell.
- Vandellia cleistandra (W.R.Barker) Eb.Fisch., Schäferh. & Kai Müll.
- Vandellia cyrtotricha (P.C.Tsoong & T.C.Ku) Y.S.Liang & J.C.Wang
- Vandellia delicatula (P.C.Tsoong & T.C.Ku) Eb.Fisch., Schäferh. & Kai Müll.
- Vandellia diffusa L.
- Vandellia eberhardtii (Bonati) Eb.Fisch., Schäferh. & Kai Müll.
- Vandellia elata Benth.
- Vandellia eremophiloides (W.R.Barker) Eb.Fisch., Schäferh. & Kai Müll.
- Vandellia harmandii (Bonati) Eb.Fisch., Schäferh. & Kai Müll.
- Vandellia humilis (Bonati) Eb.Fisch., Schäferh. & Kai Müll.
- Vandellia hypandra (W.R.Barker) Eb.Fisch., Schäferh. & Kai Müll.
- Vandellia junciformis (Bonati) Eb.Fisch., Schäferh. & Kai Müll.
- Vandellia khaoyaiensis (T.Yamaz.) Eb.Fisch., Schäferh. & Kai Müll.
- Vandellia kiangsiensis (P.C.Tsoong) Eb.Fisch., Schäferh. & Kai Müll.
- Vandellia laotica Bonati
- Vandellia latifolia (Blume) Benth.
- Vandellia lobelioides F.Muell.
- Vandellia longituba T.Yamaz.
- Vandellia macrobotrys (P.C.Tsoong) Eb.Fisch., Schäferh. & Kai Müll.
- Vandellia macrosiphonia (F.Muell.) Eb.Fisch., Schäferh. & Kai Müll.
- Vandellia matourea Steud., 1821
- Vandellia maxwellii (T.Yamaz.) Eb.Fisch., Schäferh. & Kai Müll.
- Vandellia megaphylla (P.C.Tsoong) Eb.Fisch., Schäferh. & Kai Müll.
- Vandellia micrantha (D.Don) Eb.Fisch., Schäferh. & Kai Müll.
- Vandellia montana (Blume) Benth.
- Vandellia multiflora (Roxb.) G.Don
- Vandellia prostrata Klotzsch
- Vandellia punctata Prain
- Vandellia purpurea (Kerr ex Barnett) Eb.Fisch., Schäferh. & Kai Müll.
- Vandellia rivularis (Kerr ex Barnett) Eb.Fisch., Schäferh. & Kai Müll.
- Vandellia rotundifolia Griff.
- Vandellia saginiformis Bonati
- Vandellia satakei (T.Yamaz.) Eb.Fisch., Schäferh. & Kai Müll.
- Vandellia scapigera (R.Br.) Benth.
- Vandellia scutellariiformis (T.Yamaz.) T.Yamaz.
- Vandellia senegalensis Benth.
- Vandellia setulosa (Maxim.) T.Yamaz.
- Vandellia stemodioides Miq.
- Vandellia stictantha (Hiern) Eb.Fisch., Schäferh. & Kai Müll.
- Vandellia stolonifera (T.Yamaz.) Eb.Fisch., Schäferh. & Kai Müll.
- Vandellia stricta (P.C.Tsoong & T.C.Ku) Eb.Fisch., Schäferh. & Kai Müll.
- Vandellia subracemosa (De Wild.) Eb.Fisch., Schäferh. & Kai Müll.
- Vandellia subulata (R.Br.) Benth.
- Vandellia tectanthera (W.R.Barker) Eb.Fisch., Schäferh. & Kai Müll.
- Vandellia thorelii Bonati
- Vandellia tonkinensis Bonati
- Vandellia vandellioides Hance ex Hemsl.
- Vandellia vogelii (Skan) Eb.Fisch., Schäferh. & Kai Müll.
- Vandellia yamazakii Sutthis., Chantar. & D.A.Simpson
- Vandellia yaoshanensis (P.C.Tsoong) Eb.Fisch., Schäferh. & Kai Müll
