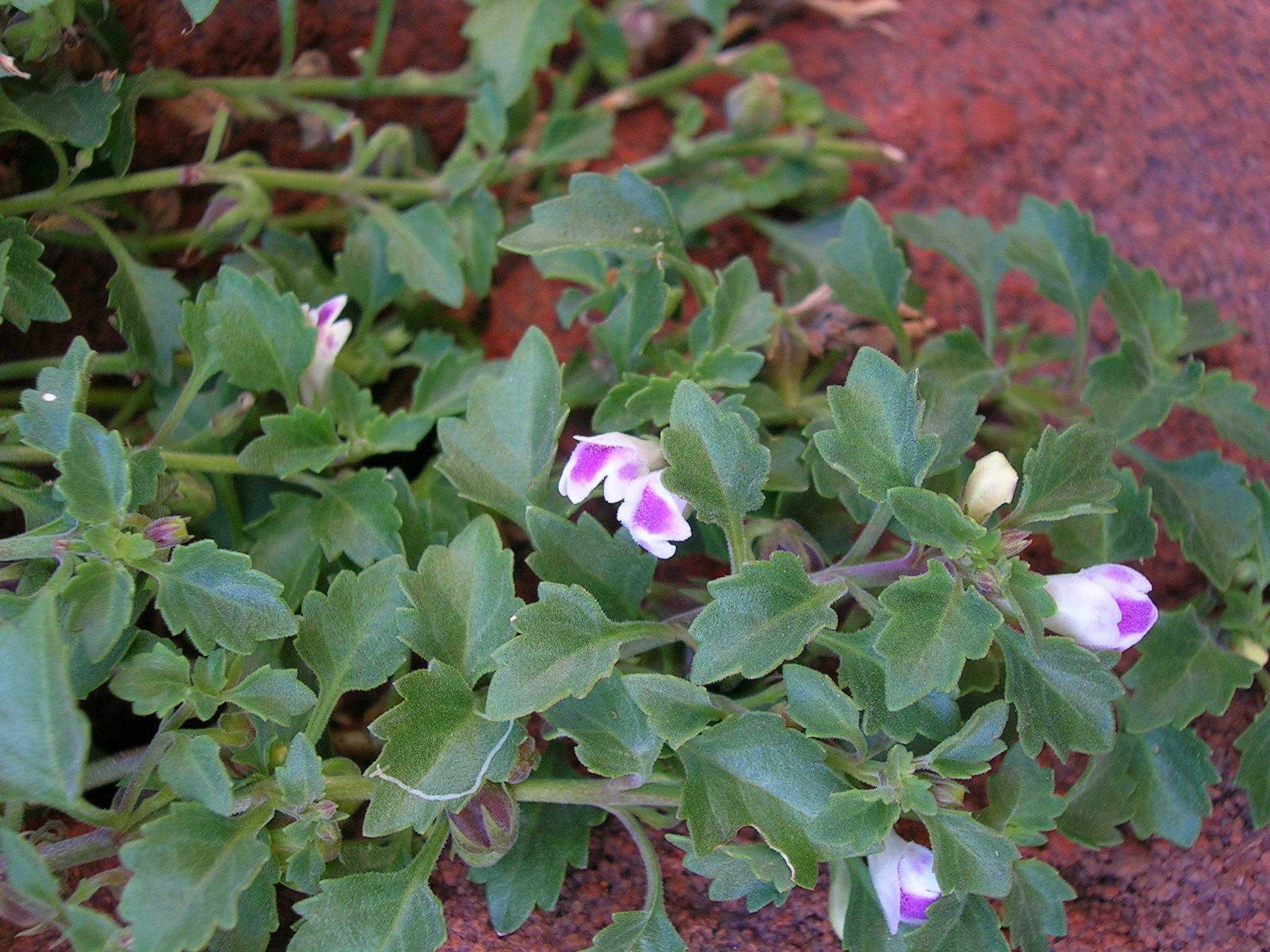

Scientific classification
- Kingdom: Plantae
- Clade: Embryophytes
- Clade: Tracheophytes
- Clade: Angiosperms
- Clade: Eudicots
- Clade: Asterids
- Order: Lamiales
- Family: Linderniaceae
- Genus: Stemodiopsis; Engl.

= Stemodiopsis =

Genus of plants

Stemodiopsis is a genus of flowering plants belonging to the family Linderniaceae.

Its native range is Tropical and Southern Africa.

== Species ==
Species:

- Stemodiopsis buchananii Skan
- Stemodiopsis eylesii S.Moore
- Stemodiopsis glandulosa Philcox
- Stemodiopsis linearis S.Moore
- Stemodiopsis rivae Engl.
- Stemodiopsis ruandensis Eb.Fisch.
