= Anetanthus =

Scientific classification
- Kingdom: Plantae
- Clade: Tracheophytes
- Clade: Angiosperms
- Clade: Eudicots
- Clade: Asterids
- Order: Lamiales
- Family: Gesneriaceae
- Genus: Anetanthus; Hiern ex Benth. & Hook.f.

Genus of flowering plants

Anetanthus is a genus of flowering plants belonging to the family Gesneriaceae.

Its native range is Southern Tropical America.

Species:

- Anetanthus disjuncta L.E.Skog & J.L.Clark
- Anetanthus gracilis Hiern
- Anetanthus ruber L.E.Skog
