= Takasi Yamazaki =

Japanese botanist (1921–2007)

- 山崎敬
- Born: 6 January 1921
- Died: 2 February 2007 (aged 86)
- Scientific career
- Author abbrev. (botany): T.Yamaz.

Takasi Yamazaki (Japanese: 山崎敬) (6 January 1921–2 February 2007) was a Japanese botanist and taxonomist.

He was born in Odawara and grew up in Yokohama. After graduating from the former Niigata High School, he graduated from Tokyo Imperial University in 1944 and studied Plant taxonomy of since his research in the laboratory of Shoji Honda. Beginning in 1954, he taught at the University of Tokyo, and in 1972, he became been a professor at the Botanical Garden attached to the University of Tokyo. In the 1960s, he participated in a field survey in Bhutan and an academic survey of the Ogasawara Islands. He studied the taxa Scrophulariaceae and Ericaceae. From 1987 to 1988, he was the chairman of the Japanese Society of Plant Taxonomy.

The standard author abbreviation T.Yamaz. is used to indicate this person as the author when citing a botanical name.
