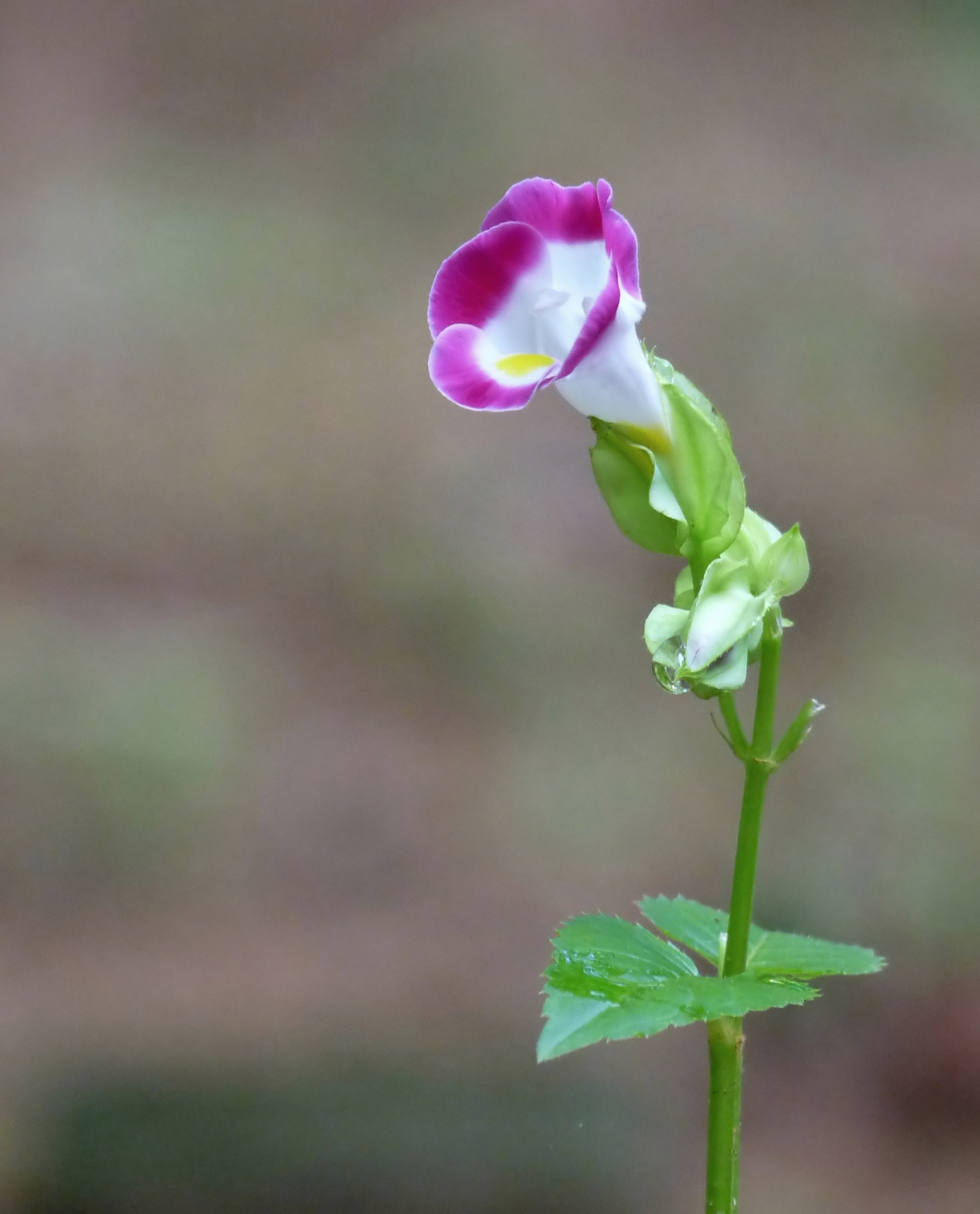
- Torenia fournieri

Scientific classification
- Kingdom: Plantae
- Clade: Tracheophytes
- Clade: Angiosperms
- Clade: Eudicots
- Clade: Asterids
- Order: Lamiales
- Family: Linderniaceae; Borsch, Kai Müll., & Eb.Fisch.

= Linderniaceae =

Family of flowering plants

Linderniaceae is a family of flowering plants in the order Lamiales, which consists of about 25 genera and 265 species occurring worldwide. It is commonly known as the false-pimpernel family. Vandellia micrantha is eaten in Laos, but tastes bitter. Best known are the wishbone flowers Torenia fournieri and Torenia thouarsii, which are used as bedding plants, especially in the tropics. Micranthemum is sold as an aquarium plant under the name 'baby tears'.

In other classifications it used to be included within family Scrophulariaceae sensu lato or more recently in Plantaginaceae sensu lato, but several authors have demonstrated that this taxon should be segregated from those families, as Linderniaceae, and it has been recognized by LAPG II and APG III. Recently a phylogeny has been published and two new Brazilian genera Catimbaua and Isabelcristinia were recently added to the family. Studies on the family limits of Linderniaceae are pending.

== Genera ==
Plants of the World Online (POWO) accepts 20 genera. GRIN also includes the genera Ameroglossum Eb.Fisch., S.Vogel & A.V.Lopes, which POWO places in Scrophulariaceae, Bythophyton Hook.f., which POWO places in Plantaginaceae, and Cubitanthus Barringer, which POWO places in Gesneriaceae.

- Artanema D.Don
- Bampsia Lisowski & Mielcarek
- Bonnaya Link & Otto
- Catimbaua L.P.Felix, Christenh. & E.M.Almeida
- Craterostigma Hochst. - sometimes considered as part of Lindernia
- Crepidorhopalon Eb.Fisch.
- Hartliella Eb.Fisch.
- Hemiarrhena Benth.
- Isabelcristinia L.P.Felix, Christenh. & E.M.Almeida
- Lindernia All. (synonym Chamaegigas Dinter ex Heil)
- Linderniella Eb.Fisch., Schäferh. & Kai Müll.
- Micranthemum Michx.
- Microcarpaea R.Br.
- Picria Lour.
- Pierranthus Bonati
- Schizotorenia T.Yamaz.
- Scolophyllum T.Yamaz.
- Stemodiopsis Engl.
- Torenia L. (synonym Legazpia Blanco)
- Vandellia L.
- Yamazakia W.R.Barker, Y.S.Liang & Wannan
