= Water snake =

The term "water snakes" is sometimes used as a descriptive term for any snakes that spend a significant time in or near aquatic environments, especially freshwater habitats, such as any species belonging to the family Acrochordidae. They should not be confused with sea snakes, which live primarily or entirely in marine environments.

Examples of water snakes include:

- Family Acrochordidae
  - Acrochordus javanicus — elephant trunk snake
  - Acrochordus arafurae — Arafura file snake
  - Acrochordus granulatus — little wart snake
- Family Boidae
  - Eunectes murinus — green anaconda or water boa
- Family Colubridae
  - Afronatrix, a monotypic genus with the sole representative, the African brown water snake, Afronatrix anoscopus
  - Hydrops (snake)
  - Hydromorphus
  - Hydrodynastes species, including:
    - Hydrodynastes gigas — false water snake or Brazilian smooth snake
  - Natrix natrix
  - Natrix tessellata
  - Nerodia species
  - Opisthotropis species
  - Ptychophis, a monotypic genus with the sole representative, the fanged water snake, Ptychophis flavovirgatus
  - Sinonatrix species, including:
    - Sinonatrix percarinatus — eastern water snake
  - Trimerodytes species
  - Fowlea species, including:
    - Fowlea piscator — Asiatic water snake or chequered keelback
  - Helicops (snake) species, including:
    - Helicops angulatus — brown-banded water snake
  - Liophis species, including:
    - Liophis cobellus
    - Liophis reginae
- Family Homalopsidae — all species, for example:
  - Cerberus rynchops — dog-faced water snake
  - Enhydris enhydris — rainbow water snake
  - Enhydris plumbea – rice paddy water snake or rice paddy snake
  - Homalopsis buccata – puff-faced water snake
- Family Viperidae
  - Agkistrodon piscivorus – cottonmouth

== Other ==
- A "water snake" is also a term for a popular fidget toy.

== See also ==
- List of marine snakes
