= Asiatic water snake =

Asiatic water snake may refer to:

- Fowlea piscator, the checkered keelback
- Trimerodytes aequifasciatus, the Asiatic annulate keelback
