= Hygroscopy =

Phenomenon of attracting and holding water molecules

Hygroscopy is the phenomenon of attracting and holding water molecules by either absorption or adsorption from the surrounding environment, which is usually at normal or room temperature. If water molecules become suspended among the substance's molecules, adsorbing substances can become physically changed, changing in volume, boiling point, viscosity or some other physical characteristic or property of the substance. For example, a finely dispersed hygroscopic powder, such as a salt, may become clumpy over time due to collection of moisture from the surrounding environment.

Deliquescent materials are sufficiently hygroscopic that they dissolve in the water they absorb, forming an aqueous solution.

Hygroscopy is essential for many plant and animal species' attainment of hydration, nutrition, reproduction and/or seed dispersal. Biological evolution created hygroscopic solutions for water harvesting, filament tensile strength, bonding and passive motion – natural solutions being considered in future biomimetics.

== Etymology and pronunciation ==
The word hygroscopy (/haɪˈɡrɒskəpi/) uses combining forms of hygro- (for moisture or humidity) and -scopy (observation). Originally, the word hygroscope referred to devices for measuring humidity level by visual observation. Early hygroscopes (around the 1790s) used materials such as certain animal hairs that visibly changed shape and size when they became damp. Such materials were then said to be hygroscopic because they were suitable for making a hygroscope. Eventually, the word hygroscope ceased to be used for any such visual instrument, but the word hygroscopic lived on, referring to the property of retaining moisture, and thus also hygroscopy (the ability to do so). In modern usage, an instrument for measuring humidity is called a hygrometer.

== History ==
Early hygroscopy literature began around 1880. Studies by Victor Jodin (Annales Agronomiques, October 1897) focused on the biological properties of hygroscopicity. He noted pea seeds, both living and dead (without germinative capacity), responded similarly to atmospheric humidity, with their weight increasing or decreasing in relation to hygrometric variation.

Marcellin Berthelot viewed hygroscopicity from the physical side, a physico-chemical process. Berthelot's principle of reversibility, which held that water dried from plant tissue could be restored hygroscopically, was published in "Recherches sur la desiccation des plantes et des tissues végétaux; conditions d'équilibre et de réversibilité," (Annales de Chimie et de Physique, April 1903).

Léo Errera viewed hygroscopicity from perspectives of the physicist and the chemist. His memoir "Sur l'Hygroscopicité comme cause de l'action physiologique à distance" (Recueil de l'lnstitut Botanique Léo Errera, Université de Bruxelles, tome vi., 1906) provided a hygroscopy definition that remains valid to this day. Hygroscopy is "exhibited in the most comprehensive sense, as displayed

1. in the condensation of the water-vapour of the air on the cold surface of a glass;
2. in the capillarity of hair, wool, cotton, wood shavings, etc.;
3. in the imbibition of water from the air by gelatine;
4. in the deliquescence of common salt;
5. in the absorption of water from the air by concentrated sulphuric acid;
6. in the behaviour of quicklime".

== Overview ==
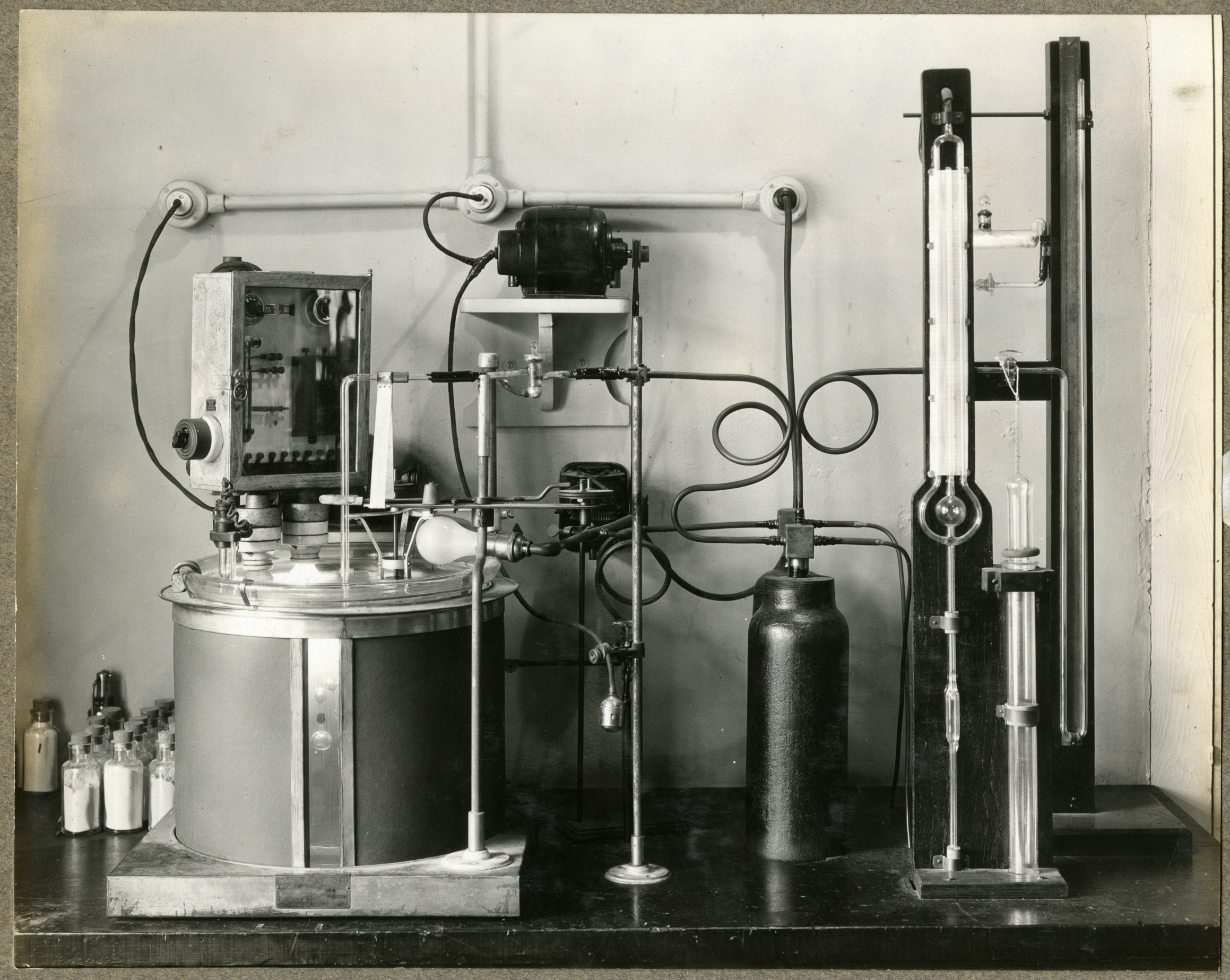
Apparatus for the determination of the hygroscopicity of fertilizer, Fixed Nitrogen Research Laboratory, around 1930

Hygroscopic substances include cellulose fibers (such as cotton and paper), sugar, caramel, honey, glycerol, ethanol, wood, methanol, sulfuric acid, many fertilizer chemicals, many salts and a wide variety of other substances.

If a compound dissolves in water, then it is considered to be hydrophilic.

Zinc chloride and calcium chloride, as well as potassium hydroxide and sodium hydroxide (and many different salts), are so hygroscopic that they readily dissolve in the water they absorb: this property is called deliquescence. Not only is sulfuric acid hygroscopic in concentrated form, but its solutions are hygroscopic down to concentrations of 10% v/v or below. A hygroscopic material will tend to become damp and cakey when exposed to moist air (such as the salt inside salt shakers during humid weather).

Because of their affinity for atmospheric moisture, desirable hygroscopic materials might require storage in sealed containers. Some hygroscopic materials, such as sea salt and sulfates, occur naturally in the atmosphere and serve as cloud seeds, cloud condensation nuclei (CCNs). Being hygroscopic, their microscopic particles provide an attractive surface for moisture vapour to condense and form droplets. Modern-day human cloud seeding efforts began in 1946.

When added to foods or other materials for the express purpose of maintaining moisture content, hygroscopic materials are known as humectants.

Materials and compounds exhibit different hygroscopic properties, and this difference can lead to detrimental effects, such as stress concentration in composite materials. The volume of a particular material or compound is affected by ambient moisture and may be considered its coefficient of hygroscopic expansion (CHE; also referred to as CME, or coefficient of moisture expansion) or the coefficient of hygroscopic contraction (CHC)—the difference between the two terms being a difference in sign convention.

Differences in hygroscopy can be observed in plastic-laminated paperback book covers: often, in a suddenly moist environment, the book cover will curl away from the rest of the book. The unlaminated side of the cover absorbs more moisture than the laminated side and increases in area, causing a stress that curls the cover toward the laminated side. This is similar to the function of a thermostat's bimetallic strip. Inexpensive dial-type hygrometers make use of this principle using a coiled strip. Deliquescence is the process by which a substance absorbs moisture from the atmosphere until it dissolves in the absorbed water and forms a solution. Deliquescence occurs when the vapour pressure of the solution that is formed is less than the partial pressure of water vapour in the air.

While some similar forces are at work here, it is different from capillary attraction, a process where glass or other solid substances attract water, but are not changed in the process (water molecules do not become suspended between the glass molecules).

== Deliquescence ==
Deliquescence, like hygroscopy, is also characterized by a strong affinity for water and tendency to absorb moisture from the atmosphere if exposed to it. Unlike hygroscopy, however, deliquescence involves absorbing sufficient water to form an aqueous solution. Most deliquescent materials are salts, including calcium chloride, magnesium chloride, zinc chloride, ferric chloride, carnallite, potassium carbonate, potassium phosphate, ferric ammonium citrate, ammonium nitrate, potassium hydroxide, and sodium hydroxide. Owing to their very high affinity for water, these substances are often used as desiccants, which is also an application for concentrated sulfuric and phosphoric acids. Some deliquescent compounds are used in the chemical industry to remove water produced by chemical reactions (see drying tube).

The characteristic relative humidity value at which dissolution occurs is called the deliquescence relative humidity (DRH) or critical relative humidity (CRH). The DRH value depends on temperature and the form of the solid phase, specifically on the formation of crystalline hydrates.

The DHR values for some compounds are shown below.

Substance	DRH at 25 °C, %
Magnesium chloride	32.8
Potassium carbonate	43.2
Magnesium nitrate	52.9
Sodium bromide	57.6
Sodium chloride	75.3
Ammonium sulfate	80.0
Potassium chloride	84.3
Potassium nitrate	93.6
Potassium sulfate	97.3

== Biology ==
Hygroscopy appears in both plant and animal kingdoms, with the latter benefiting from hydration and nutrition. Some amphibian species secrete a hygroscopic mucus that harvests moisture from the air. Orb web building spiders produce hygroscopic secretions that preserve the stickiness and adhesion force of their webs. One aquatic reptile species is able to travel beyond aquatic limitations, onto land, due to its hygroscopic integument.

Plants benefit from hygroscopy via hydration and reproduction – demonstrated by convergent evolution examples. Hygroscopic movement (hygrometrically activated movement) is integral in fertilization, seed/spore release, dispersal and germination. The phrase "hygroscopic movement" originated in 1904's "Vorlesungen Über Pflanzenphysiologie", translated in 1907 as "Lectures on Plant Physiology" (Ludwig Jost and R.J. Harvey Gibson, Oxford, 1907). When movement becomes larger scale, affected plant tissues are colloquially termed hygromorphs. Hygromorphy is a common mechanism of seed dispersal as the movement of dead tissues respond to hygrometric variation, as in the spore release from the fertile margins of Onoclea sensibilis. Movement occurs when plant tissue matures, dies and desiccates, cell walls drying, shrinking; and also when humidity re-hydrates plant tissue, cell walls enlarging, expanding. The direction of the resulting force depends upon the architecture of the tissue and is capable of producing bending, twisting or coiling movements.

=== Hygroscopic hydration examples ===
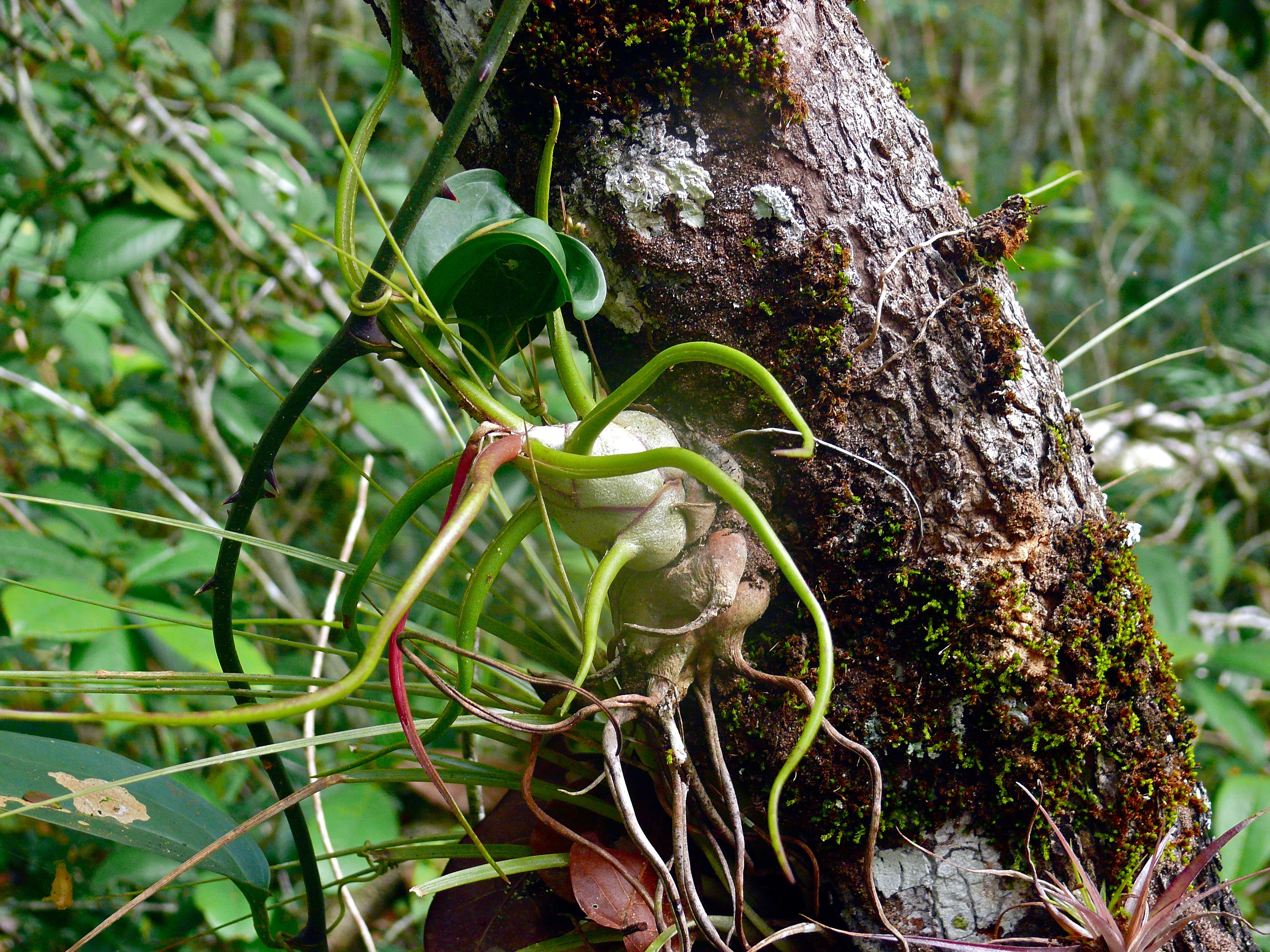
Air plant (Tillandsia bulbosa)

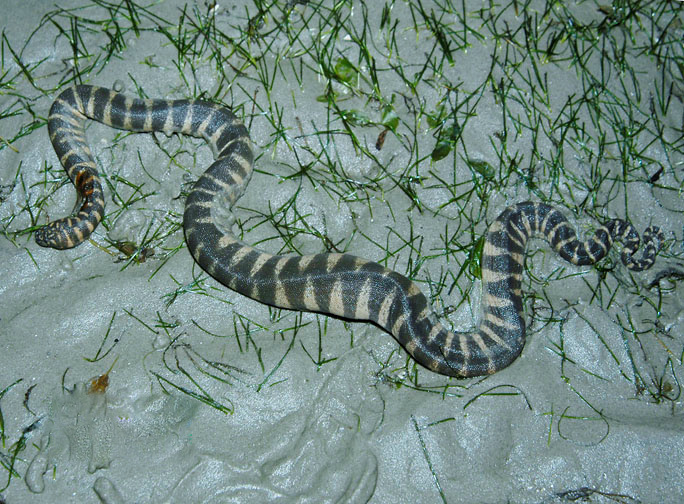
The aquatic file snake (A. granulatus) with hygroscopic skin, shown out of water

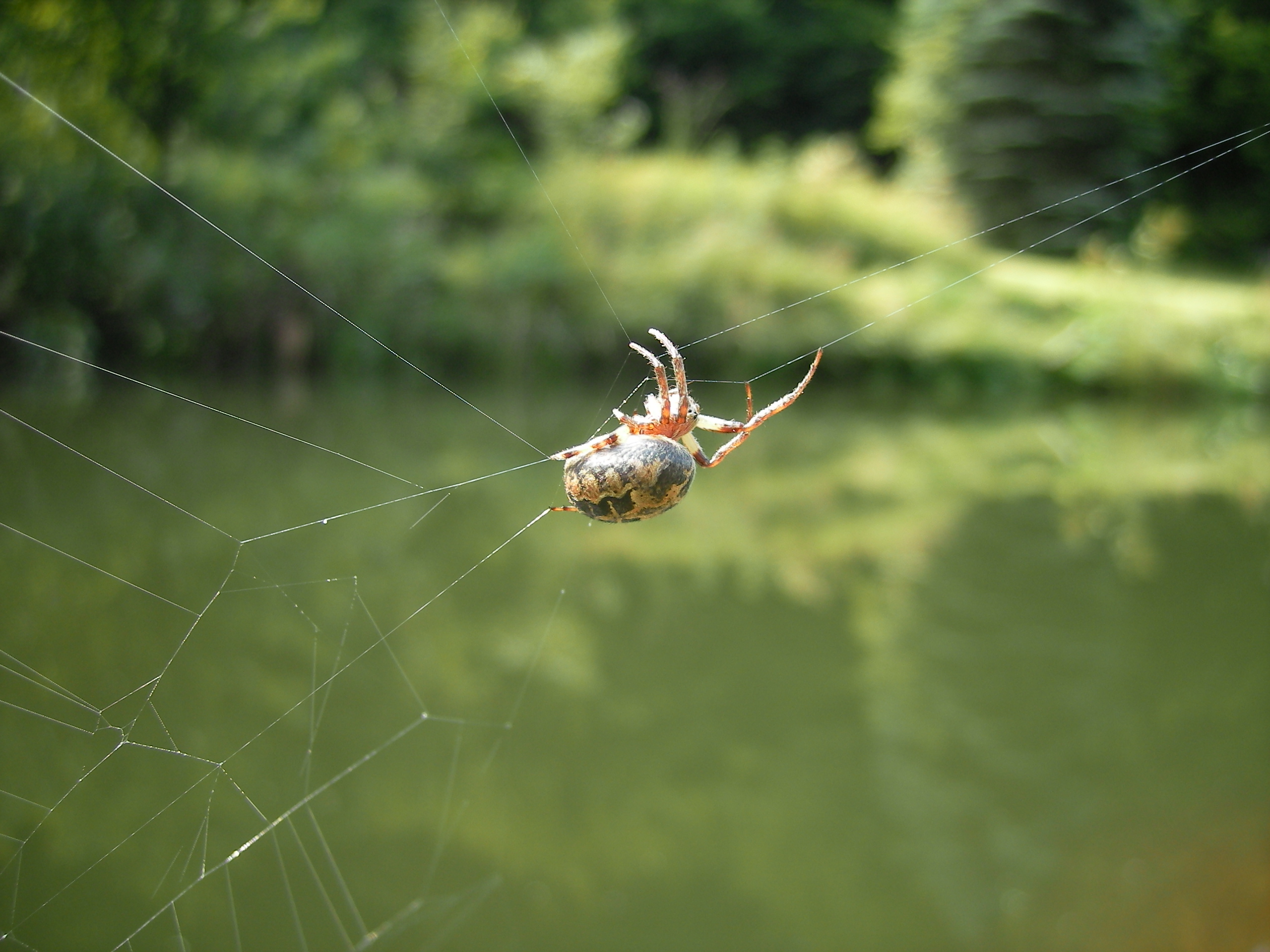
An orb-weaver spider (Larinioides cornutus) with hygroscopic coated capture threads

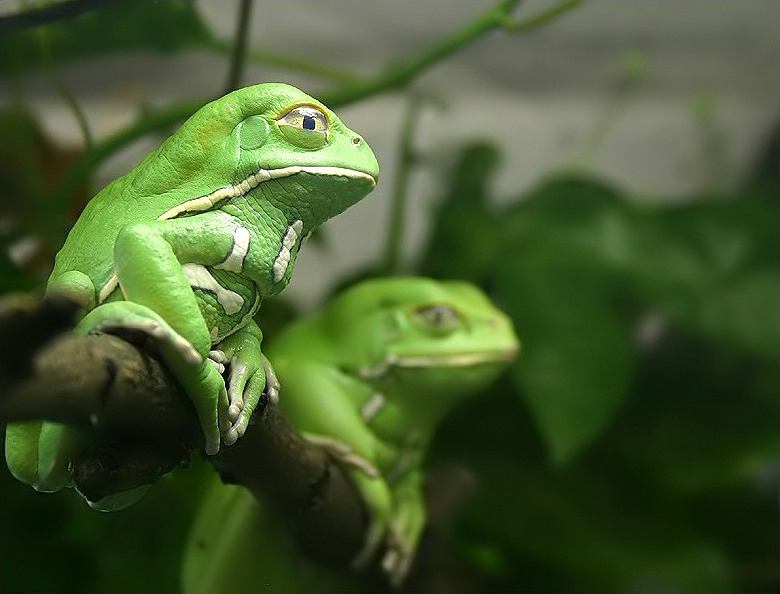
Waxy monkey tree frog (Phyllomedusa sauvagii)
- Air plants, a Tillandsia species, are epiphytes that use their degenerated, non-nutritive roots to anchor upon rocks or other plants. Hygroscopic leaves absorb their necessary moisture from humidity in the air. The collected water molecules are transported from leaf surfaces to an internal storage network via osmotic pressure with capacity sufficient for the plant's growing requirements.
- The file snake (Acrochordus granulatus), from a family known as completely aquatic, has hygroscopic skin that serves as a water reservoir, retarding desiccation, allowing it to travel out of water.
- Another example is the sticky capture silk found in spider webs, e.g. from the orb-weaver spider (Larinioides cornutus). This spider, as typical, coats its threads with a self-made hydrogel, an aggregate blend of glycoproteins, low molecular mass organic and inorganic compounds (LMMCs), and water. The LMMCs are hygroscopic, thus is the glue, its moisture absorbing properties using environmental humidity to keep the capture silk soft and tacky.
- The waxy monkey tree frog (Phyllomedusa sauvagii) and the Australian green tree frog (Litoria caerulea) benefit from two hygroscopically-enabled hydration processes; transcutaneous uptake of condensation on their skin and reduced evaporative water loss due to the condensed water film barrier covering their skin. Condensation volume is enhanced by the hygroscopic secretions they wipe across their granular skin.
- Some toads use hygroscopic secretions to reduce evaporative water loss, Anaxyrus sp. being an example. The venomous secretion from its parotoid gland also includes hygroscopic glycosaminoglycans. When the toad wipes this protective secretion on its body its skin becomes moistened by the surrounding environmental humidity, considered an aid in water balance.
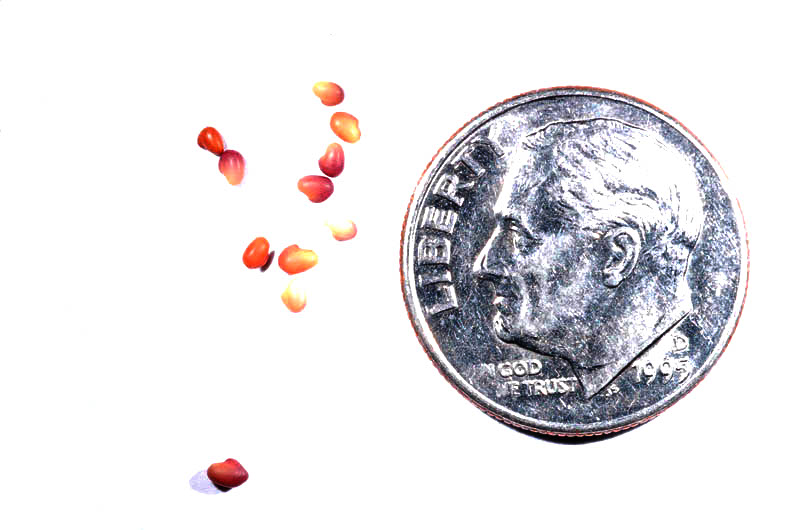
  Seeds of Trifolium pratense (red clover) next to a U.S. dime for scale

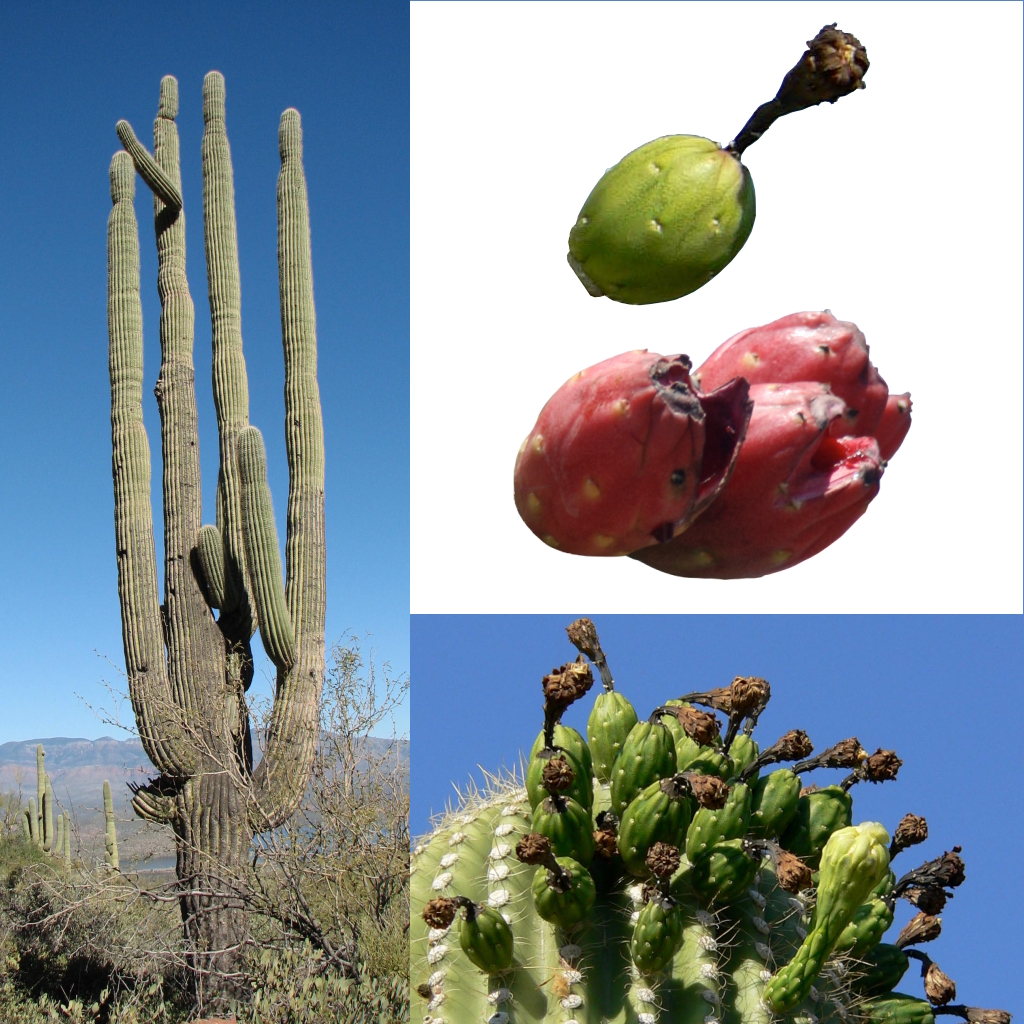
Saguaro (Carnegiea gigantea) fruit bearing hygroscopic, humidity absorbing seed

- Red and white clover (Trifolium pratense) and (Trifolium repens), yellow bush lupine (Lupinus arboreus) and several members of the legume family have a hygroscopic hilar valve (hilum) that controls seed embryo moisture levels. The saguaro (Carnegiea gigantea), another eudicots species, also has hygroscopic seeds shown to imbibe up to 20% atmospheric moisture, by weight. Functionally, the hilar valve allows water vapor to enter or exit to ensure viability, while blocking liquid water. If however, humidity levels gradually rise to a high enough level, the hilar valve remains open, allowing liquid water passage for germination. Physiologically, the inner and outer epidermis have independent hilar valve control. The outer epidermis has columnar-shaped cells, annularly arranged about the hilum. These counter palisade cells, being hygroscopic, respond to external humidity by swelling and closing the hilar valve during high humidity, preventing water absorption into the seed. Reversibly, they shrivel, opening the valve during low humidity, allowing the seed to expel excess moisture. The inner epidermis, inside the seed's impermeable integument, has palisade epidermis cells, a second annularly arranged hygroscopic layer attuned to the embryo's moisture level. There exists a moisture tension between inner and outer palisade cells. For the hilum to close, this moisture needs to exceed some minimum level (14–25% for these species). While the hilar valve is open (during low outer humidity), if the humidity suddenly increases, the moisture tension reaches that protective threshold and the hilum closes, preventing moisture (liquid water) from entering. If, however, the outer humidity rises gradually, implying suitable growing conditions, the moisture tension level doesn't immediately exceed the threshold, keeping the hilum open and enabling the gradual moisture entry necessary for imbibition.

=== Hygroscopic-assisted propagation examples ===
Typical of hygroscopic movement are plant tissues with "closely packed long (columnar) parallel thick-walled cells (that) respond by expanding longitudinally when exposed to humidity and shrinking when dried." Cell orientation, pattern structure (annular, planar, bi-layered or tri-layered) and the effects of the opposite-surface's cell orientation control the hygroscopic reaction. Moisture responsive seed encapsulations rely on valves opening when exposed to wetting or drying; discontinuous tissue structures provide such predetermined breaking points (sutures), often implemented by reduced cell wall thickness or seams within bi- or tri-layered structures. Graded distributions varying in density and/or cell orientation focus hygroscopic movement, frequently observed as biological actuators (a hinge function); e.g. pinecones (Pinus spp.), the ice plant (Aizoaceae spp.) and the wheat awn (Triticum spp.), described below.

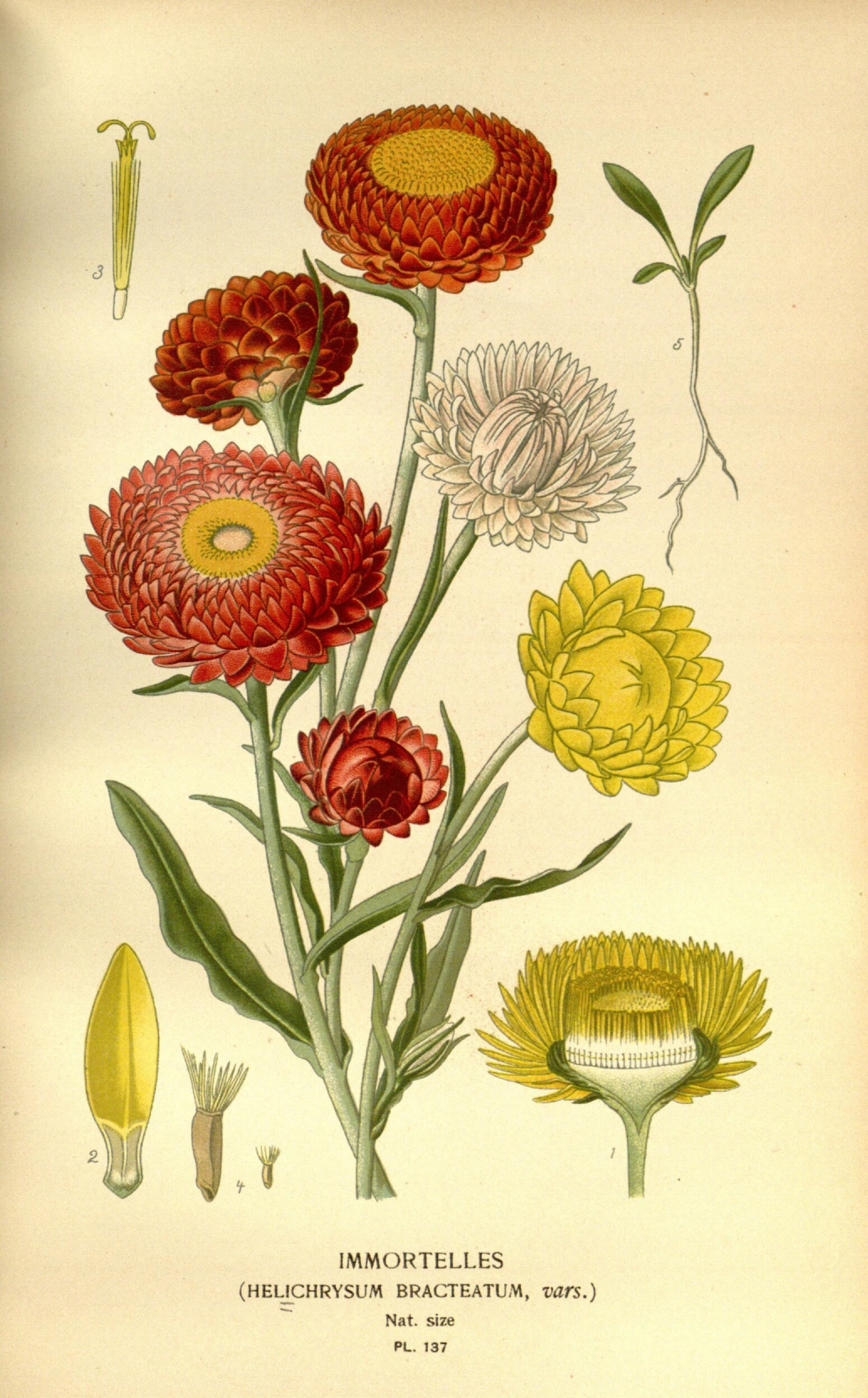
Illustration botanique, Xerochrysum (Helichrysum) bracteatum; No.1- Capitulum [bracts, florets, stamens]

- Hygroscopic bi-layered cell arrays act as a capitulum hinge in some plants, Xerochrysum bracteatum and Syngonanthus elegans being examples. The hygroscopic bending of involucral bracts surrounding a capitulum contributes to flower protection and pollination and assists dispersion by protecting delicate pappi filaments from entanglement or destruction by precipitation, e.g. Taraxacum (dandelions). In nature these involucral bracts have a diurnal rhythm. The whorl of hygroscopic bracts bend outward exposing the capitulum (see illustration) during the day, then inward, closing it at night, as the relative humidity shifts in response to the daily temperature change. Bracts are scarious, the hinge and blade composed exclusively of dead cells (Nishikawa et al., 2008), allowing the hygroscopically activated bracts to function from flowering through achene dispersal. Physiologically, the bract's lower section is source to the hinge-like function, consisting of sclerenchyma-like abaxial (inner petal) tissue, parenchyma and adaxial epidermis (outer petal tissue). Bract cell wall composition is rather uniform but its cells gradually change in orientation. The bract's hygroscopic bending is due to the differing cell orientations of its inner and outer epidermides, causing adaxial–abaxial force gradients between opposing sides that change with moisture; thus, the aggregate hygrometric force, in whorl unison, controls the capitulum's repetitive opening and closing.
- Some trees and shrubs in fire-prone regions evolved a dual-stage hygroscopic dispersal; an initial thermo-sensitive enabling (extreme heat or fire), then a serotinous hygroresponsive seed release. Examples are the woody fruits of Myrtaceae (e.g. Eucalyptus species plurimae, Melaleuca spp.) and Proteaceae (e.g. Hakea spp., Banksia spp., Xylomelum spp.) and the woody cones of Pinaceae (e.g. Pinus spp.) and the cypress family (Cupressaceae), e.g. the giant sequoia (Sequoiadendron giganteum)). Typical in lodgepole pine (Pinus contorta), Eucalyptus, and Banksia are resin-sealed seed encapsulations that require the heat of fire to physically melt the resin, enabling serotinous seed release. Such seed encapsulations may "reduce seed loss or damage from granivores, desiccation, and fire." The similarity of dual-stage dispersal techniques between different clades, angiosperms and gymnosperms, can be interpreted as a result of convergent evolution.
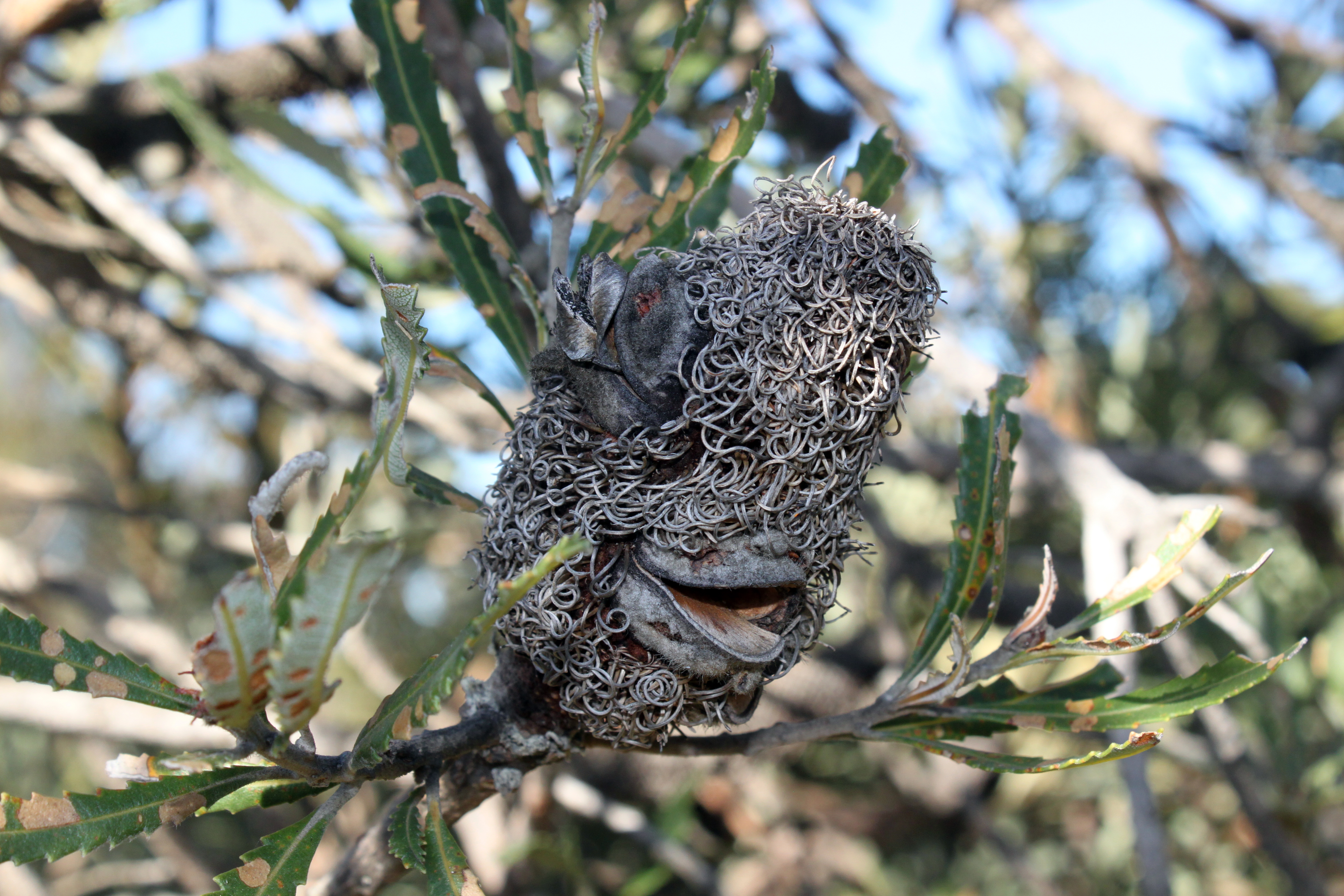
  Banksia Attenuata cone with open follicles
  - Banksia attenuata, typical of Banksia spp., has a seed bearing follicle composed of a bi-layer hygroscopic cell network. The woody follicle is thermo-sensitive, then hygroresponsive; serotinous humidity opening the ventral suture and exposing seed when germination conditions are favorable. Physiologically, the heat-sensitive follicle valves of Banksia spp. are sealed by a wax (resin) layer, released by high ambient temperatures (fire), "thereby facilitating opening." The follicle mesocarp consists of high density branched fiber bundles; the endocarp, low density parallel fibers. A suture is caused by differential hygroscopic movements between layers, their microfibril structures having a large angle disparity (microfibril angle (MFA) γ = 75–90°).
  - Pine cone scales (pinaceae spp.) employ a hygromorphic hinge for their seed release. Physiology involves a bi-layered structure of closely packed long parallel thick-walled cells. Fiber alignments within layers are non-uniform, varying longitudinally, producing different microfibril angles (MFAs) of 30° and 74° between layers over the span of the scale. The region of greatest MFA, the hinge knuckle, is a small region near the scale and midrib (central stem) union. In mature pine cones the outer scale layer is the controlling tissue, its long thick-walled cells responding longitudinally to environmental humidity. Distortion occurs in the knuckle region as movement of the outer layer overtakes that of the more passive inner scale layer, forcing the scale to bend or flex. The remainder of the scale is hygroscopically passive, though amplifies apex displacement via length and geometrically; e.g. bending the scale closed with hydration or flexing it open with dehydration- releasing seed.
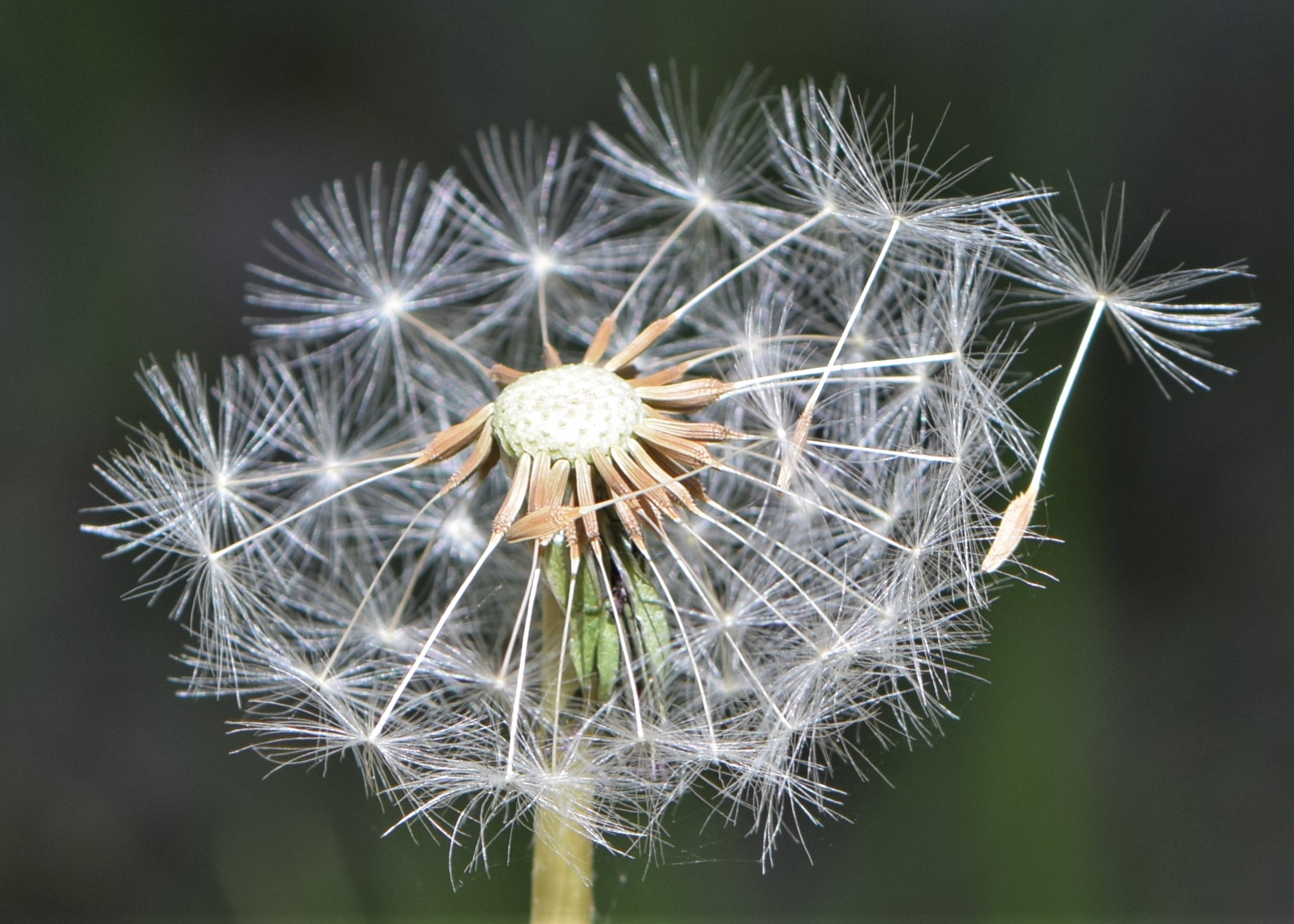
    Taraxacum officinale capitulum and achene seed-beak-apical plate-pappus
- Flowering plants of the Asteraceae family have hygroscopically-influenced dispersion, coordinating anemochory (wind dispersal) with favorable environmental conditions, common in A. genera Erigeron, Leontodon, Senecio, Sonchus and Taraxacum. As example, the flight-enabling pappus of the common dandelion achene undergoes binary morphing (opened or closed) of its whisker-like filaments, in unison with chorused responses of the remaining achenes. Pappus movement is controlled via a hygroscopic actuator in the apical plate, at the beak's top, the locus for all the achene's filaments. High humidity causes each pappus to close, contracting its radially patterned structure, reducing its area and the likelihood of wind current dispersal. For any achene that become released, flight dynamics of the reduced pappus dramatically limit dispersal range. The hygroscopic actuator's responsiveness to changes in relative humidity (RH) is predictable, repeatable; e.g. the pappi of centaurea imperialis remain closed at ≥ 78% RH and open completely at ≤ 75% RH. During more favorable lower humidity conditions, pappi fully expand and wind current allochory is re-enabled.
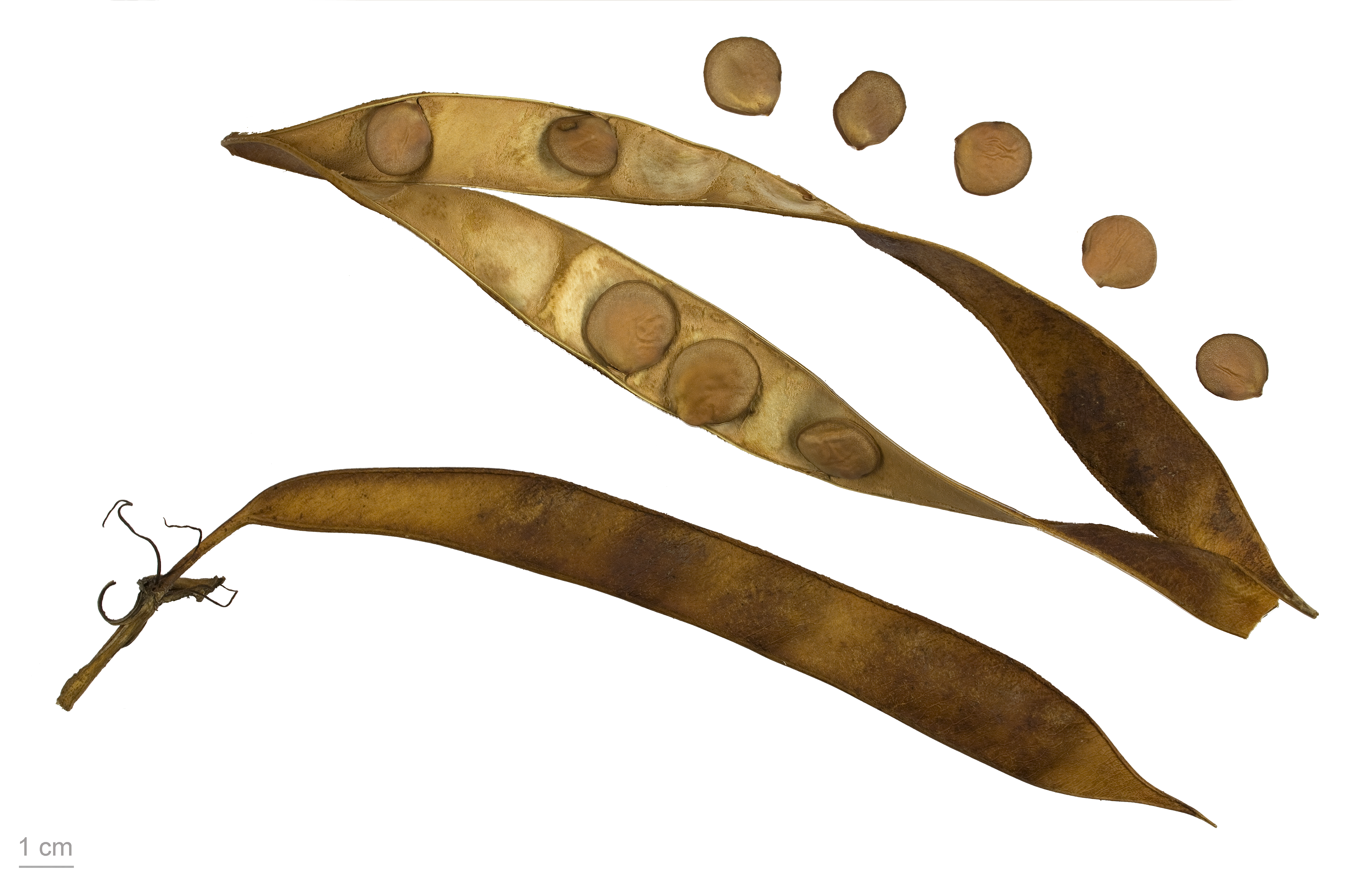
  Orchid tree (Bauhinia variegata) seed pods
- The orchid tree (Bauhinia variegata) depends upon hygro-responsive twisting for its dispersal. Its seed pod contains two hygroscopic sclerenchyma fibre layers, nearly orthogonal, joining at the valves. During dehiscence the large 90° microfibril angle between endocarp layers, combined with dual sided shrinkage, results in opposing helical torques that force a suture at the weakest point, the seed case valves; their opening releases seed.
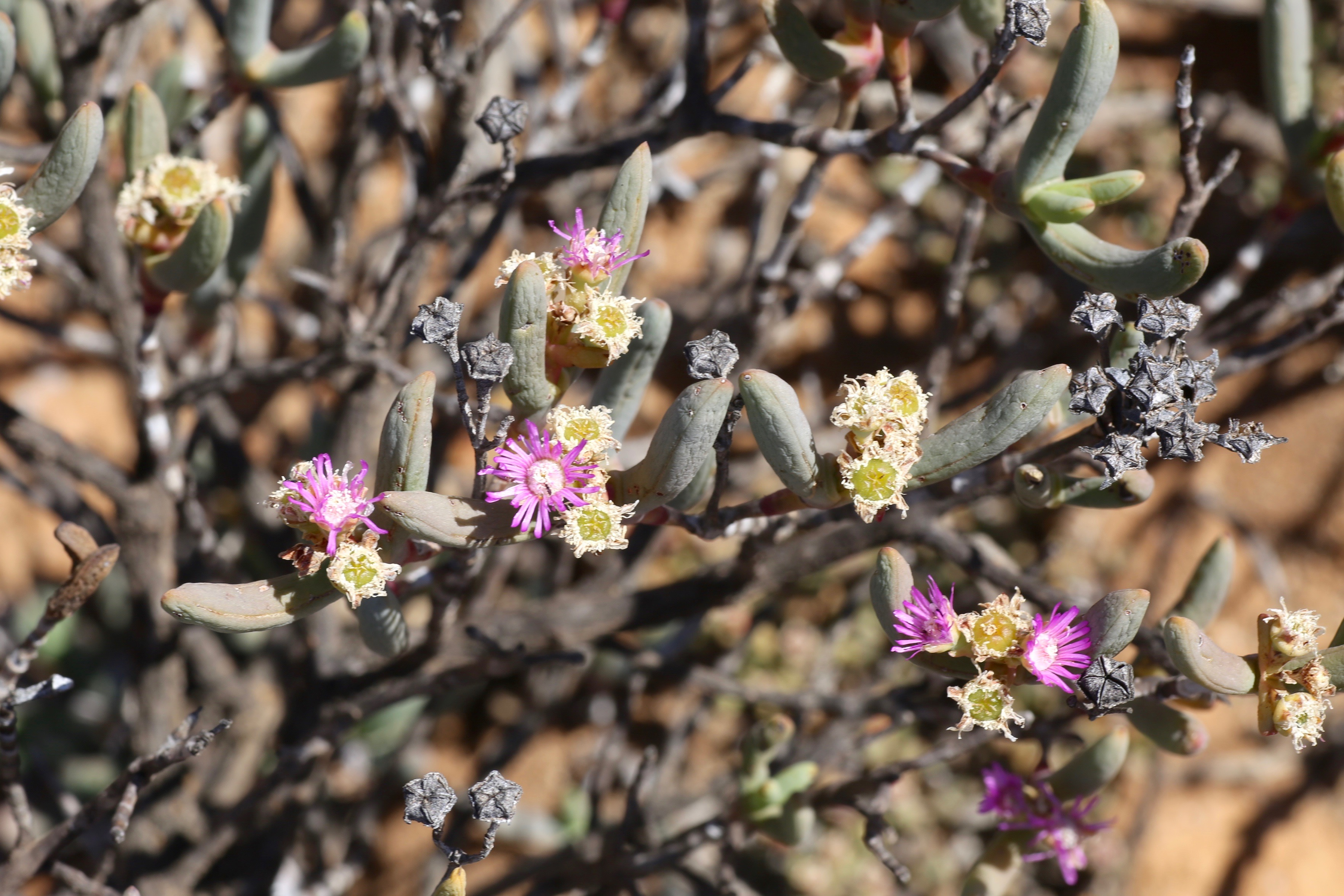
  Ruschia sp. (Aizoaceae) flowers and multi-stage seed capsules
- Some plants synchronize the opening of their mature seed capsule with active rainfall- hygrochasy. This dispersal technique is frequently observed in the arid regions of southern and eastern Africa, the Negev desert, parts of North America and Somalia, and believed evolved to offer higher survival rates in arid environs. Hygrochasy is commonly associated with family Aizoaceae, the ice plant, as > 98% of its species utilize post-wetting dehiscence; such dispersal is also observed in family Plantaginaceae with the alpine Veronica of New Zealand, evolving in the last 9Myr. Common to all seed capsules are triangular circumferentially-arranged hygroscopic keels (valves) covering its seeds. These protective valves mechanically open only when hydrated with liquid water. Each keel (five for Delosperma nakurense (Engl.) Herre) is composed of cellulosic lattice tissue that swells with hydration, opening within minutes. The enlarged cells force straightening of an inherent desiccated fold in the keel, the hygroscopic hinge, near the keel's union with the capsule perimeter. Fully opened, the keel pivots over 150°, upward then backward, exposing seed compartments, one beneath each valve, separated by septa, all resting upon the capsule floor. Seeds are visible, but restrained by the cup-like ring created by the encircling keels. The final requirement for dispersal is rainfall, or sufficient moisture, to flush seed from this barrier, colloquially termed the splash cup. Seed that overflows or splashes from the cup is dispersed to the nearby ground. Any remaining seed will be preserved when keels desiccate, hygroscopically shrink, and restore to their natural folded, closed state. The hygromorphic process is reversible, repeatable; neglected seed having subsequent dispersal opportunity via future rainfalls.
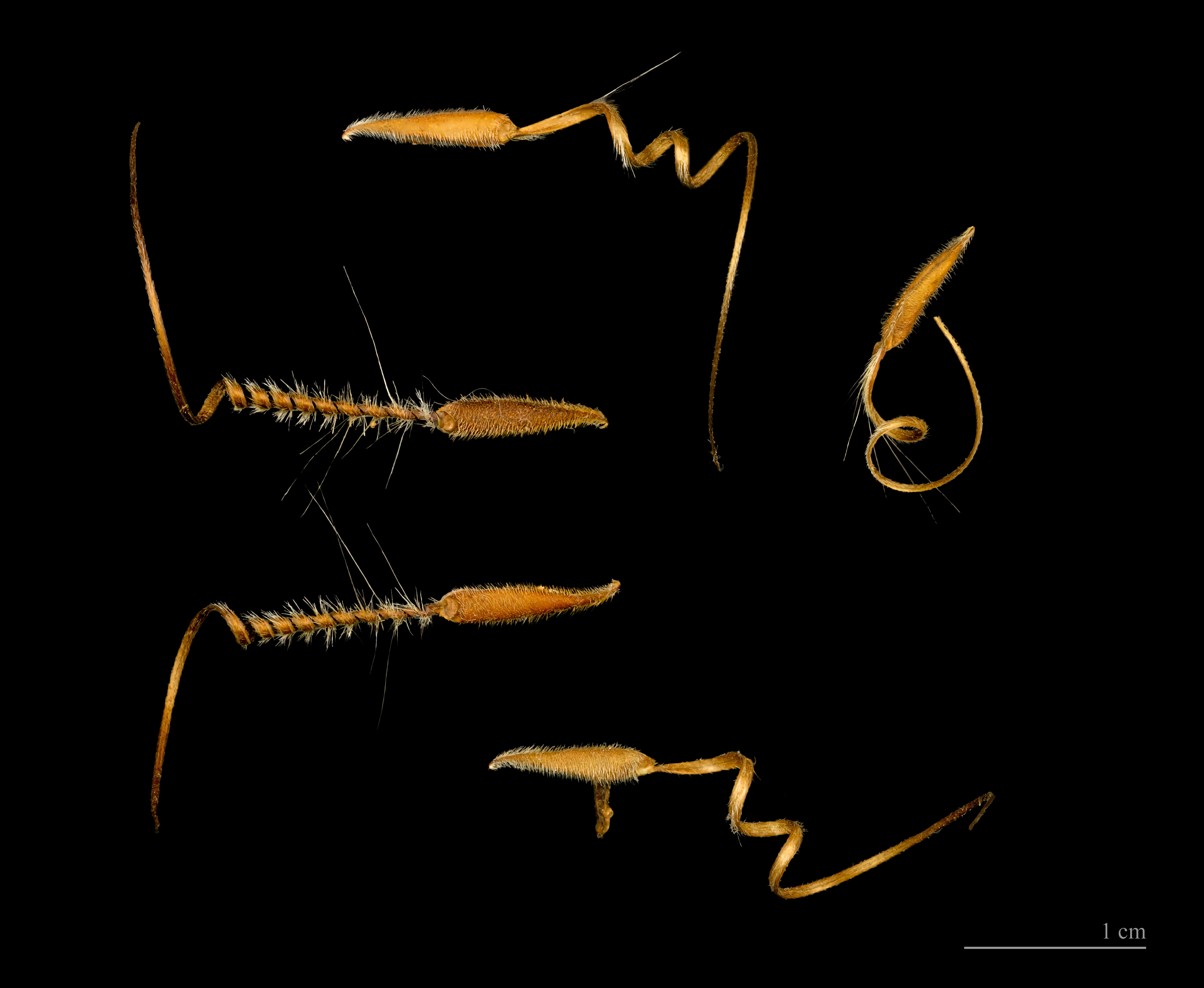
  Common stork's-bill (Erodium cicutarium) achenes with coiled awns
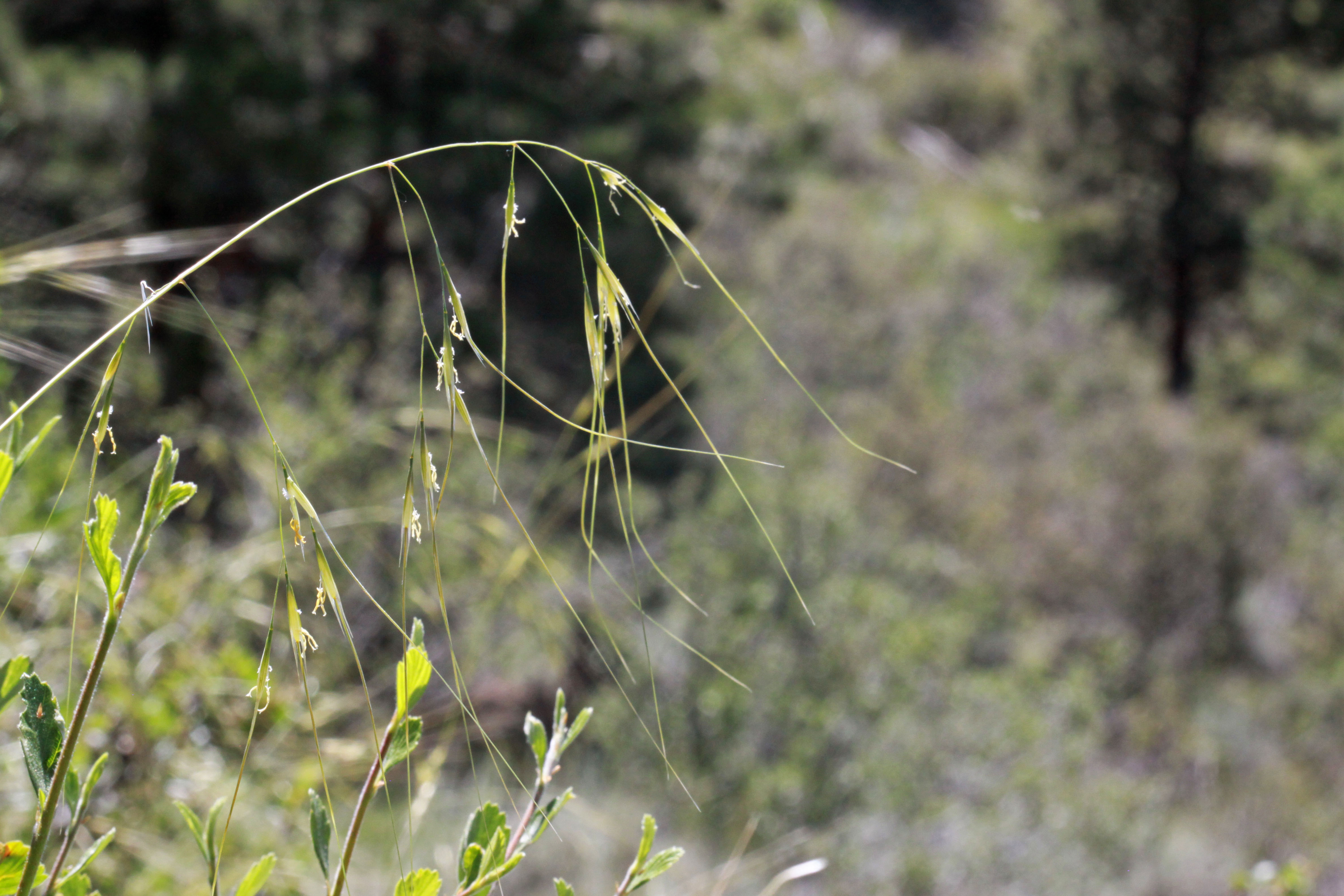
  Needle-and Thread (Hesperostipa comata) seedbuds
- The seeds of some flowering herbs and grasses have hygroscopic appendages (awns) that bend with changes in humidity, enabling them to disperse over the ground, termed herpochory. The awn will thrust (or twist) when the seed is released, its motion dependent upon plant physiology. Subsequent hygrometric changes cause movements to repeat, thrusting (or twisting), pushing the seed into the ground.

Two angiospermae families have similar methods of dispersal, though method of implementation varies within family: Geraniaceae family examples are the common stork's-bill (Erodium cicutarium) and geraniums (Pelargonium sp.); Poaceae family, Needle-and-Thread (Hesperostipa comata) and wheat (Triticum spp.). All rely upon a bi-layered parallel fiber hygroscopic cell physiology to control the awn's movement for dispersal and self-burial of seeds. Alignment of cellulose fibrils in the awn's controlling cell wall determines direction of movement. If fiber alignments are tilted, non-parallel venation, a helix develops and awn movement becomes twisting (coiling) instead of bending; e.g. coiling occurs in awns of Erodium, and Hesperostipa.

- Some plants use hygroscopic movements for Ballochory (self-dispersal), active ballists forcibly ejecting their seeds; e.g. species of geranium, violet, wood sorrel, witch hazel, touch-me-not (Impatiens), and acanthus. Rupturing of the Bauhinia purpurea seed pod reportedly propels its seed up to 15 metres distance.

== Engineering properties ==
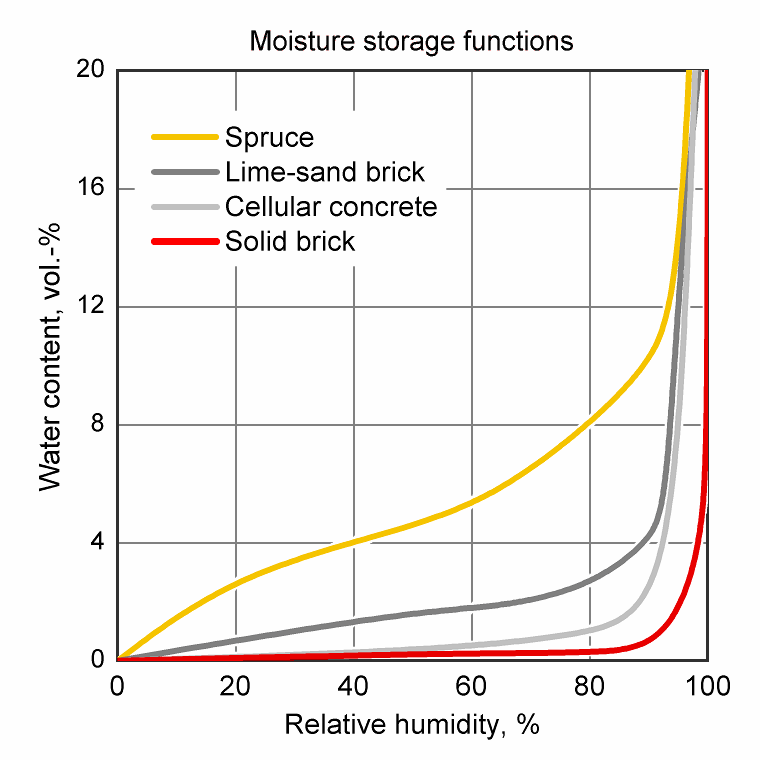
Hygroscopic qualities of various materials illustrated in graph form; relative humidity on the X-axis and moisture content on the Y-axis

Hygroscopicity is a general term used to describe a material's ability to absorb moisture from the environment. There is no standard quantitative definition of hygroscopicity, so generally the qualification of hygroscopic and non-hygroscopic is determined on a case-by-case basis. For example, pharmaceuticals that pick up more than 5% by mass, between 40 and 90% relative humidity at 25 °C, are described as hygroscopic, while materials that pick up less than 1%, under the same conditions are regarded as non-hygroscopic.

The amount of moisture held by hygroscopic materials is usually proportional to the relative humidity. Tables containing this information can be found in many engineering handbooks and is also available from suppliers of various materials and chemicals.

Hygroscopy also plays an important role in the engineering of plastic materials. Some plastics, such as nylon, are hygroscopic while others are not.

== Polymers ==
Many engineering polymers are hygroscopic, including nylon, ABS, polycarbonate, cellulose, carboxymethyl cellulose, and poly(methyl methacrylate) (PMMA, plexiglas, perspex).

Other polymers, such as polyethylene and polystyrene, do not normally absorb much moisture, but are able to carry significant moisture on their surface when exposed to liquid water.

Type-6 nylon (a polyamide) can absorb up to 9.5% of its weight in moisture.

== Applications in baking ==
The use of different substances' hygroscopic properties in baking are often used to achieve differences in moisture content and, hence, crispiness. Different varieties of sugars are used in different quantities to produce a crunchy, crisp cookie (British English: biscuit) versus a soft, chewy cake. Sugars such as honey, brown sugar, and molasses are examples of sweeteners used to create moister and chewier cakes.

== Research ==
Several hygroscopic approaches to harvest atmospheric moisture have been demonstrated and require further development to assess their potentials as a viable water source.

Experiments with fog collection, in select environments, duplicated the hydrophilic surfaces and hygroscopic surface wetting observed in tree frog hydration (biomimicry). Subsequent material optimizations developed artificial hydrophilic surfaces with collection rates of 25 mg H_{2}O/(cm^{2} h), more than twice the collection rate of tree frogs under comparable conditions, i.e. 100% RH (relative humidity).

- Another approach performs at lower 15–30% RHs but also has environs limitations; a sustainable biomass source is necessary. Super hygroscopic polymer films composed of biomass and hygroscopic salts are able to condense moisture from atmospheric humidity. By implementing rapid sorption-desorption kinetics and operating 14–24 cycles per day, this technique produced an equivalent water yield of 5.8–13.3 L kg^{−1} of sustainable raw materials, demonstrating the potential for low-cost, scalable atmospheric water harvesting.

Hygroscopic glues are candidates for commercial development. The most common cause of synthetic glue failure at high humidity is attributed to water lubricating the contact area, impacting bond quality. Hygroscopic glues may allow more durable adhesive bonds by absorbing (pulling) inter-facial environmental moisture away from the glue-substrate boundary.

Integrating hygroscopic movement into smart building designs and systems is frequently mentioned, e.g. self-opening windows. Such movement is appealing, an adaptive, self-shaping response that requires no external force or energy. However, capabilities of current material choices are limited. Biomimetic design of hygromorphic wood composites and hygro-actuated building systems have been modeled and evaluated.

Hygrometric response time, precise shape changes and durability are lacking. Most currently available hygro-actuated composites are inferior and exhibit fatigue failure well before that seen in nature, e.g. in pine cone scales, indicating that a better understanding of the plants' biological structures is needed. Materials composed of fluid-responsive active bilayer systems that can direct planned conformational hygromorphing are necessary.

Current composites require undesirable trade-offs between hygromorphic response time and mechanical stability that must also be balanced with changing environmental stimuli.

== See also ==
- Cloud condensation nuclei
- Critical relative humidity
- Efflorescent
- Equilibrium moisture content
- Hydrophile
- Hydrophobe
