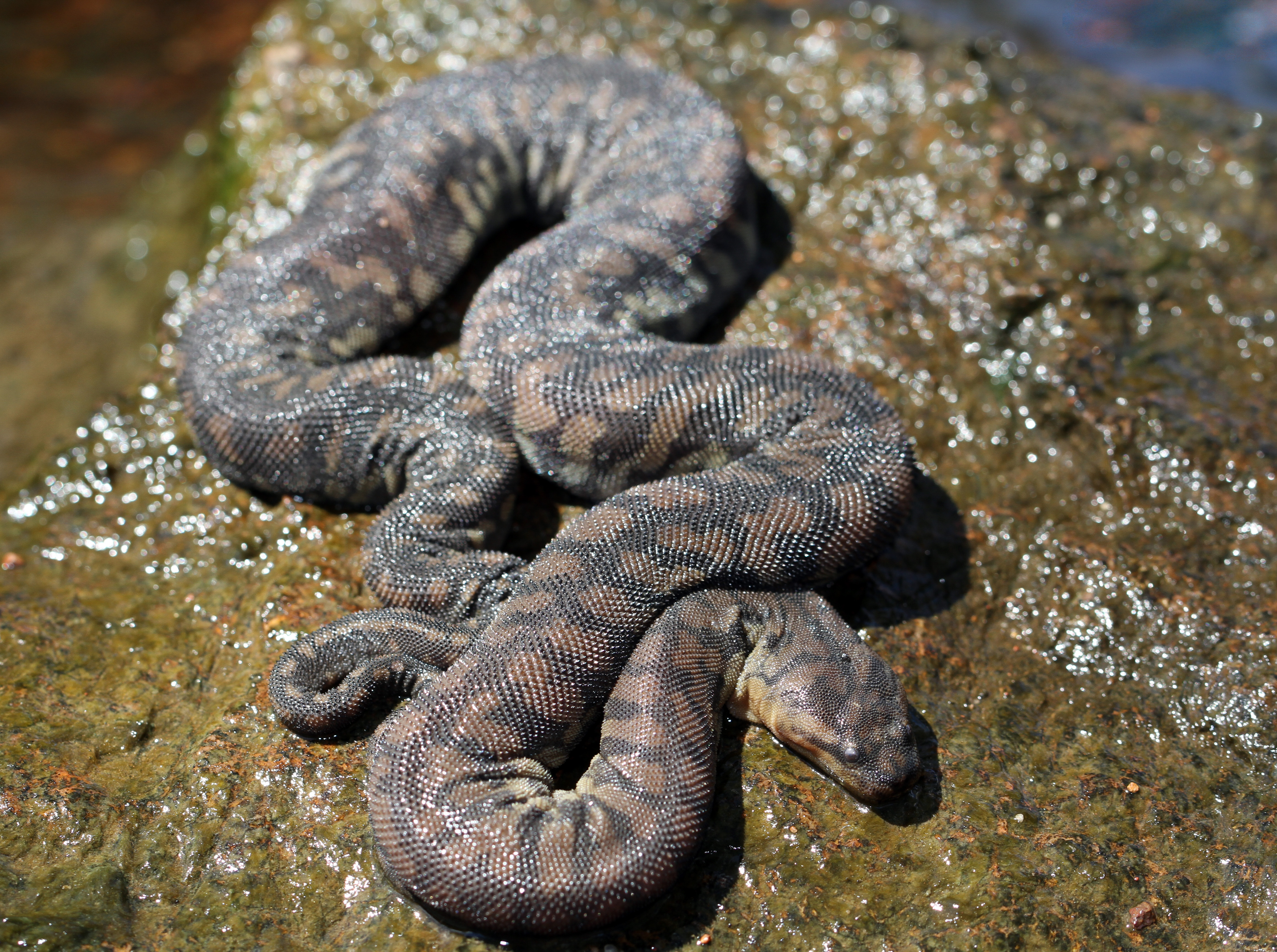
- Acrochordus arafurae

Scientific classification
- Kingdom: Animalia
- Phylum: Chordata
- Class: Reptilia
- Order: Squamata
- Suborder: Serpentes
- Superfamily: Acrochordoidea
- Family: Acrochordidae; Bonaparte, 1831
- Genus: Acrochordus; Hornstedt, 1787

Synonyms
- Acrochordidae: List: Acrochordina Bonaparte, 1831; Acrochordidae Bonaparte, 1840; Acrochorniens A.M.C. Duméril, 1853; Acrochordidae Jan, 1863; Acrochordinae Boulenger, 1893; Acrochordoidae McDowell, 1975; Acrochordini Dowling & Duellman, 1978; Acrochordus: List: Acrochordus Hornstedt, 1787; Chersydrus Cuvier, 1817; Chersidrus Oken, 1817; Acrochordus Gray, 1825; Chersydreas Gray, 1825; Chershydrus Bonaparte, 1831; Verrucator Schlegel, 1837; Chersydraeas Gray, 1849; Potamophis Schmidt, 1852; Chersydraeus Duméril, Bibron & Duméril, 1854; Acrochordus Boulenger, 1893

= Acrochordus =

Acrochordus Temporal range: 11.608–0 Ma Middle Miocene - present

Family of reptiles

The Acrochordidae, commonly known as wart snakes, Java wart snakes, file snakes, elephant trunk snakes, or dogface snakes are a monogeneric family of snakes. The sole genus Acrochordus is a lineage of aquatic snakes found in Australia and tropical Asia, with three species recognized. Genomic data indicate that the family is the sister group to the other families in the clade Caenophidia.

== Description ==
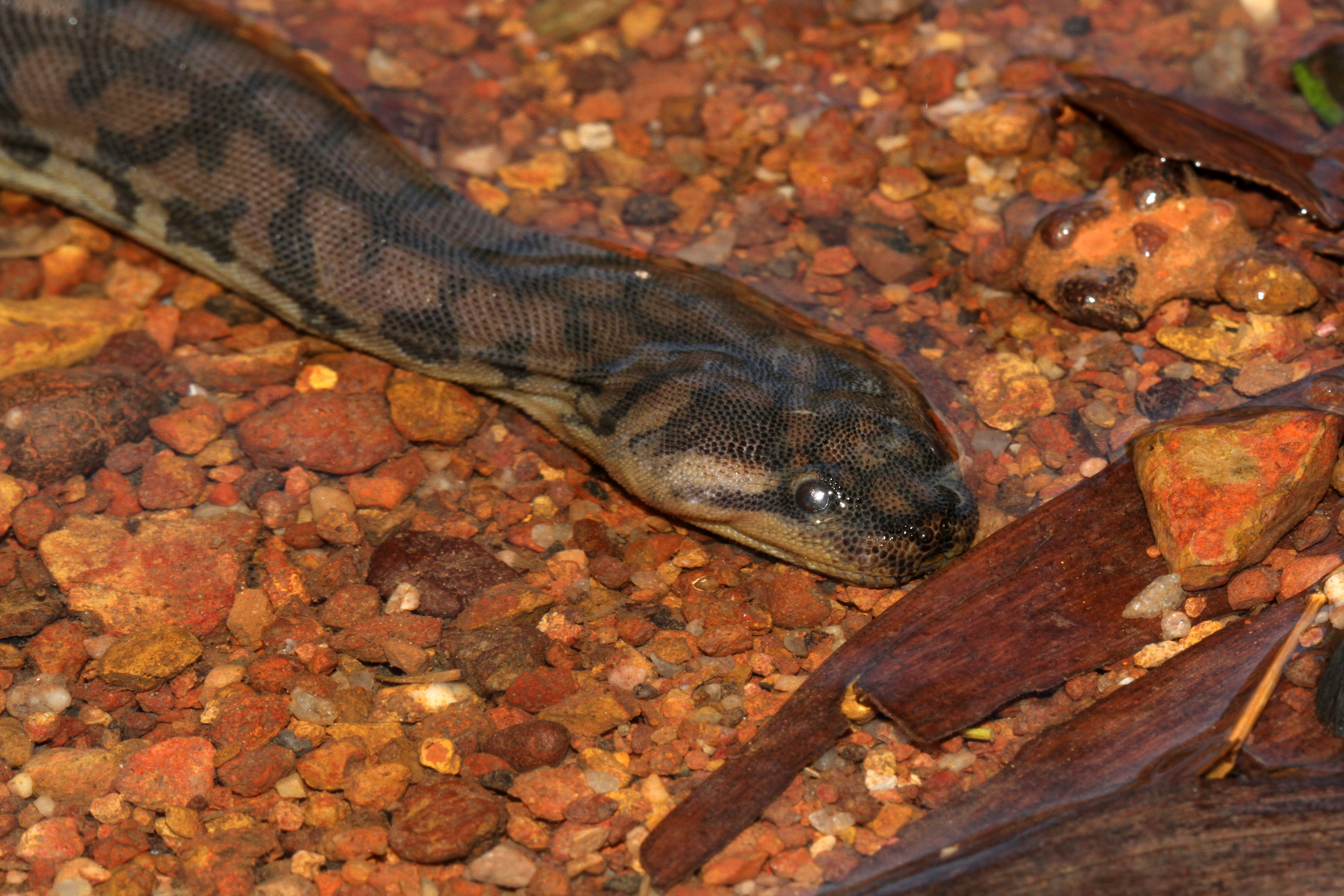
Head of Acrochordus arafurae

All are entirely aquatic, lacking the broad belly-scales found in most other snakes and possessing dorsally located eyes. Their most notable feature is their skin and scales. The skin is loose and baggy, giving the impression of being several sizes too large for the snake, and the scales, rather than overlapping, possess tiny pyramidal projections that led to their common names. Adults grow to between 60 and 243 centimetres (24 and 96 in) in length.

This type of snake are ambush predators, lurking at the bottom of rivers, streams and estuaries, and waiting for fish to approach, which they grip with their coils. The rough scales allow them to hold the fish despite the mucus coating.

== Geographic range ==
Found from western India and Sri Lanka through tropical Southeast Asia to the Philippines, south through the Indonesian island group to Timor, east through New Guinea to the northern coast of Australia to Mussau Island, the Bismarck Archipelago and Guadalcanal Island in the Solomon Islands.

== Relation to humans ==
These animals are rapidly becoming rare as their hides are used for handbags and leather (stripped of scales, of course). Numerous attempts have been made by both zoos and private reptile collectors to keep them, but in all cases, they have been reluctant to feed and prone to skin infections.

== Species ==
Common name	Scientific name	IUCN Red List Status	Distribution	Picture
Arafura file snake	Acrochordus arafurae McDowell, 1979	LC^{IUCN}	New Guinea and northern Australia.	
Little wart snake	Acrochordus granulatus (Schneider, 1799)	LC^{IUCN}	Peninsular India, Sri Lanka, Myanmar, the Andaman Islands, Thailand, Cambodia, Vietnam, China, the Philippines, Malaysia, Papua New Guinea, the Solomon Islands, and coastal northern Australia.	
Elephant trunk snake	Acrochordus javanicus Hornstedt, 1787	LC^{IUCN}	Southeast Asia from Vietnam, Cambodia and Thailand, south through Malaysia, Singapore and Indonesia (Sumatra, Java and Borneo).	
