= Trimerodytes annularis =

Conservation status
- Least Concern (IUCN 3.1)

Scientific classification
- Kingdom: Animalia
- Phylum: Chordata
- Class: Reptilia
- Order: Squamata
- Suborder: Serpentes
- Family: Colubridae
- Genus: Trimerodytes
- Species: T. annularis

Binomial name
- Trimerodytes annularis (Hallowell, 1856)

Synonyms
- Tropidonotus annularis Hallowell, 1856; Tropidonotus chinensis Jan, 1859; Tropidonotus semifasciatus Berthold, 1859; Tropidonotus habereri Werner, 1903; Sinonatrix annularis

Species of snake

The red-bellied annulate keelback or ringed water snake (Trimerodytes annularis) is a species of snake in the family Colubridae. It is found in Taiwan and eastern China.
