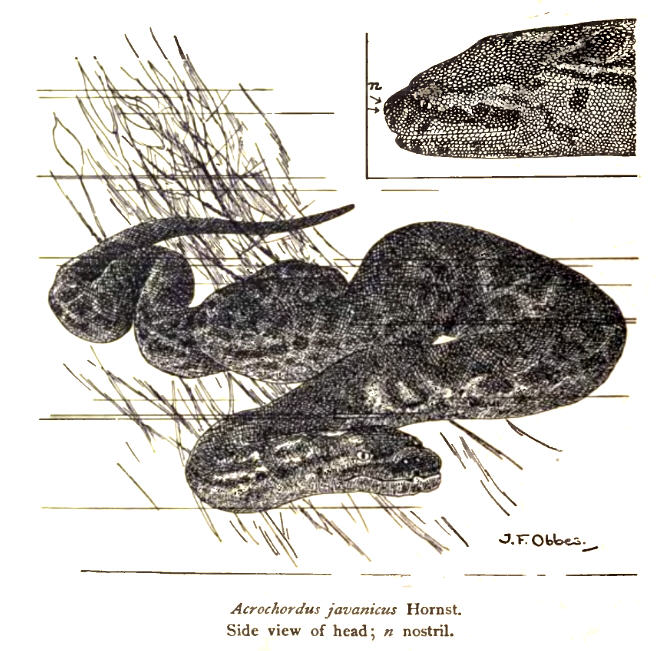
- Illustration of the elephant trunk snake

Conservation status
- Least Concern (IUCN 3.1)

Scientific classification
- Kingdom: Animalia
- Phylum: Chordata
- Class: Reptilia
- Order: Squamata
- Suborder: Serpentes
- Family: Acrochordidae
- Genus: Acrochordus
- Species: A. javanicus

Binomial name
- Acrochordus javanicus Hornstedt, 1787

= Elephant trunk snake =

Species of snake

The elephant trunk snake or the Javan file snake (Acrochordus javanicus), is a species of snake in the family Acrochordidae, a family which represents a group of primitive non-venomous aquatic snakes.

== Description ==
The elephant trunk snake possesses a wide and flat head, and its nostrils are situated on the top of the snout. Those head particularities confer to A. javanicus a certain resemblance with boas. However, its head is only as wide as its body. Females are bigger than males, and the maximum total length (including tail) of an individual is 2.4 m (94 in). The dorsal side of the snake's body is brown, and its ventral side is pale yellow.

The skin is baggy and loose giving the impression that it is too big for the animal. The skin is covered with small rough adjacent scales. The skin is also used in the tannery industry.

The top of the head has no large shields, but instead is covered with very small granular scales. There are no ventral scales. The body scales are in about 120 rows around the body. The body is stout, and the tail is short and prehensile.

The elephant trunk snake is fully adapted to live underwater so much that its body cannot support its weight out of water and leaving the water can cause it serious injury.

== Reproduction ==
An aquatic snake, the elephant trunk snake is ovoviviparous, with the incubation lasting 5 to 6 months and the female expelling 6 to 17 young.

== Geographic range ==
The elephant trunk snake is found in Southeast Asia west of the Wallace Line: southern Thailand, the west coast of Peninsular Malaysia, Singapore, Borneo (Kalimantan, Sarawak), a number of Indonesian islands (Java, Sumatra, and (possibly) Bali); possibly also in Cambodia and Vietnam, although the last is discredited by the IUCN.

== Habitat ==
The elephant trunk snake has a coastal living habitat like rivers, estuaries and lagoons. But it prefers freshwater and brackish environments.

== Feeding ==
The elephant trunk snake is an ambush predator that preys on fishes and amphibians. It usually catches its prey by folding its body firmly around the prey. Its loose, baggy skin and its sharp scales find their utility by limiting any risk of escape of the prey, in particular fishes which have bodies covered with a viscous, protective mucus.

== Behaviour ==
The elephant trunk snake is nocturnal. It spends most of its life under water and rarely goes on land. It can stay under water for up to 40 minutes.

== Original publication ==
- Hornstedt CF (1787). "Beskrifning på en Ny Orm från Java ". Kongl. Vetenskaps Akademiens Handlingar 4: 306-308 + Plate XII. (Acrochordus javanicus, new species). (in Latin and Swedish).
