= Nova genera plantarum =

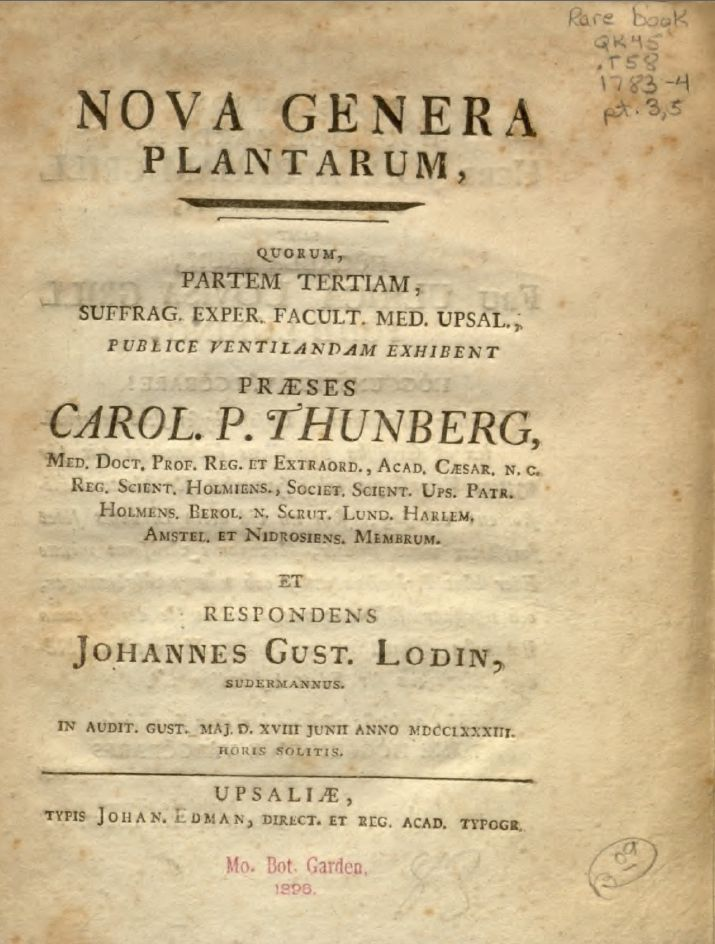

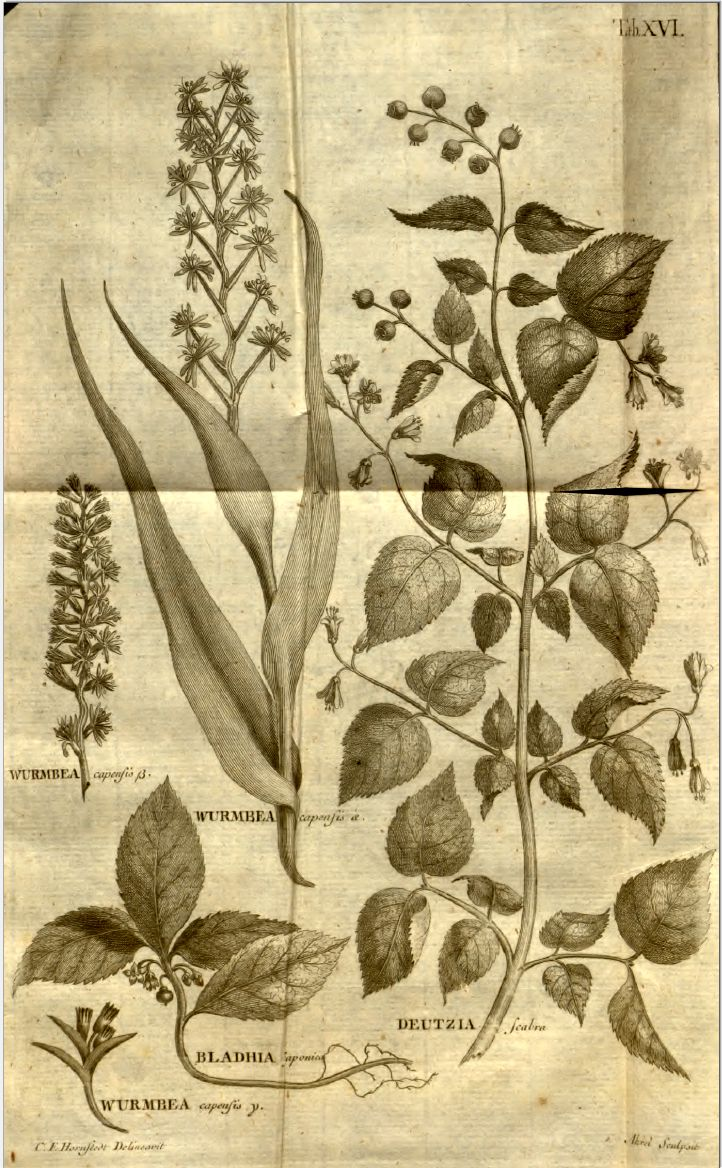

Nova genera plantarum, commonly abbreviated as Nov. Gen. Pl., was a register of plants published from Uppsala by Thunberg from 1781 onwards, listing new genera. Contributing editors were

- Peter Ulrik Berg
- Carl Fredrik Blumenberg
- Nils Gustaf Bodin
- Pehr Branström
- Claës Fredrik Hornstedt, 1758–1809
- Carl Fredrik Lexow
- Johan Gustaf Lodin
- Claus Erik Mellerborg
- Carl Henrik Salberg
- Andreas Gustaf Salmenius
- Carl Fredrik Sjöbeck
- Gustaf Erik Sörling
- Gabriel Tobias Ström, 1770–1840
- Erik Carl Trafvenfeldt
- Conrad Wallenius
- Samuel Wallner, 1778–1865

Artists contributing illustrations:

- Samuel Niclas Casström, 1763–1827
- Claës Fredrik Hornstedt, 1758–1809

Many botanical publications started with the phrase "Nova genera plantarum.....". Notable were the ones by Pier Antonio Micheli (1679–1737), Carl Magnus Dassaw (1719–1751), Heinrich Adolph Schrader (1767–1836), and Aimé Bonpland (1773–1868).
