= Trimerodytes yunnanensis =

Conservation status
- Least Concern (IUCN 3.1)

Scientific classification
- Kingdom: Animalia
- Phylum: Chordata
- Class: Reptilia
- Order: Squamata
- Suborder: Serpentes
- Family: Colubridae
- Genus: Trimerodytes
- Species: T. yunnanensis

Binomial name
- Trimerodytes yunnanensis Rao & Yang, 1998

Synonyms
- Sinonatrix yunnanensis

Species of snake

Trimerodytes yunnanensis is a species of snake in the family Colubridae. It is found in Thailand, the province Yunnan in China, and Burma. It is commonly known as the Yunnan water snake or Yunnan annulate keelback.
