= Hydrodynastes bicinctus =

Conservation status
- Least Concern (IUCN 3.1)

Scientific classification
- Kingdom: Animalia
- Phylum: Chordata
- Class: Reptilia
- Order: Squamata
- Suborder: Serpentes
- Family: Colubridae
- Genus: Hydrodynastes
- Species: H. bicinctus

Binomial name
- Hydrodynastes bicinctus (Hermann, 1804)

Species of snake

Hydrodynastes bicinctus, also known as the Herrmann's water snake, is a snake of the colubrid family. It is found in Guyana, Suriname, French Guiana, Brazil, Colombia, and Venezuela.

== Diet ==
Herrmann's water snakes eat fish, frogs, lizards, other snakes, and small mammals.
