= Trimerodytes yapingi =

Scientific classification
- Kingdom: Animalia
- Phylum: Chordata
- Class: Reptilia
- Order: Squamata
- Suborder: Serpentes
- Family: Colubridae
- Genus: Trimerodytes
- Species: T. yapingi

Binomial name
- Trimerodytes yapingi Guo, Zhu, & Liu, 2019

Species of snake

The Jingdong water snake (Trimerodytes yapingi) is a species of snake in the family Colubridae. It is found in China.
