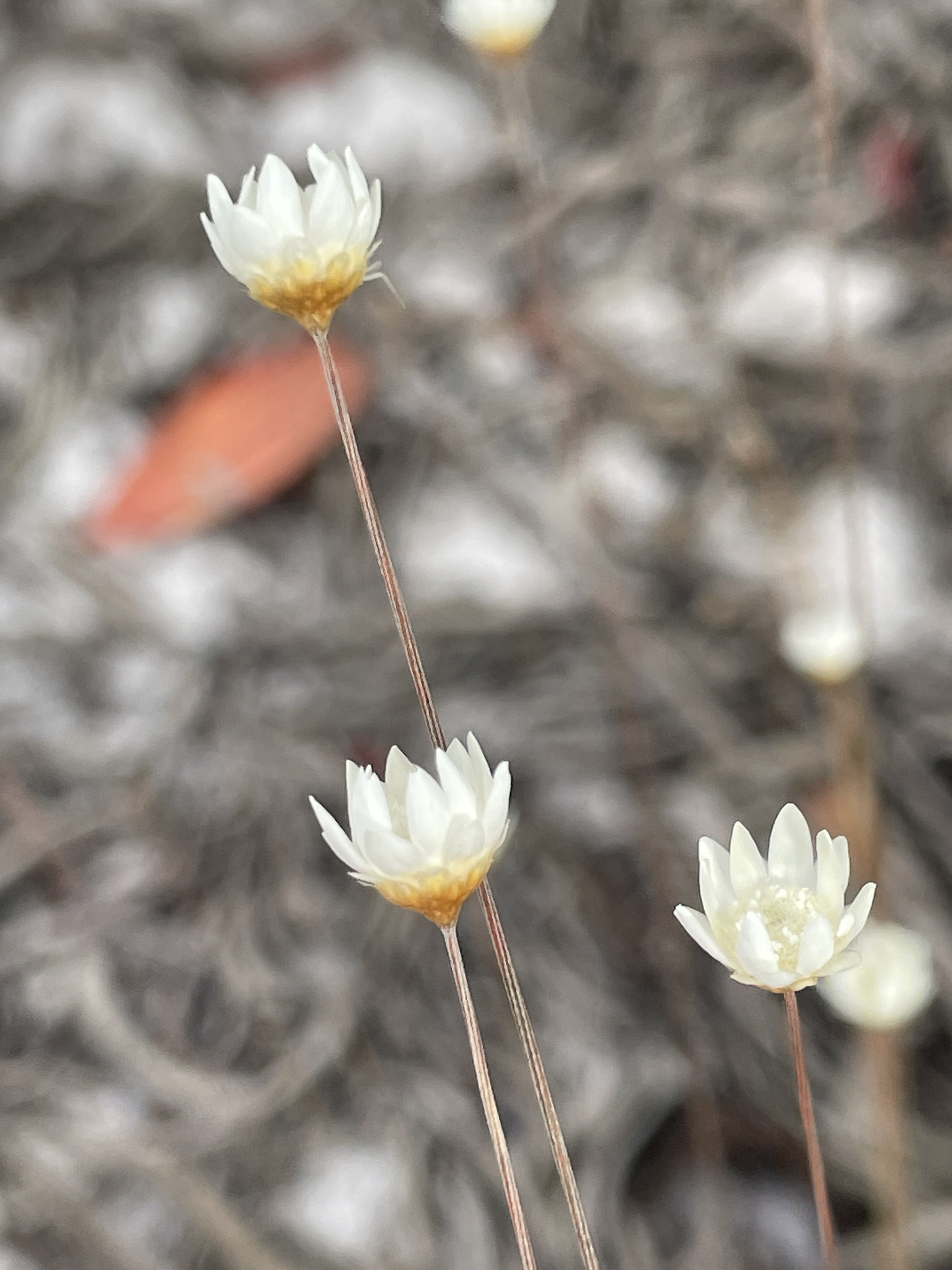
- Comanthera aciphylla

Scientific classification
- Kingdom: Plantae
- Clade: Embryophytes
- Clade: Tracheophytes
- Clade: Spermatophytes
- Clade: Angiosperms
- Clade: Monocots
- Clade: Commelinids
- Order: Poales
- Family: Eriocaulaceae
- Genus: Comanthera; L.B.Sm.

= Comanthera =

Genus of flowering plants

Comanthera is a genus of plants in the Eriocaulaceae. It is native to tropical South America.

The name was first published in 1937 with one species (C. linderi, now called C. kegeliana). More recent authors reexamined the group and concluded that several other species should be transferred into Comanthera.

== Species ==
39 species are accepted.

- Comanthera aciphylla (Bong.) L.R.Parra & Giul. – Minas Gerais
- Comanthera angustifolia (Moldenke) Echtern. – Venezuela (Amazonas)
- Comanthera aurifibrata (Silveira) L.R.Parra & Giul. – Brazil, Colombia
- Comanthera bahiensis (Moldenke) L.R.Parra & Giul. – Morro do Chapéu in Bahia
- Comanthera bisulcata (Körn.) L.R.Parra & Giul. – Bahia, Minas Gerais, Goiás
- Comanthera borbae A.C.S.Pereira & Giul. – Bahia
- Comanthera brasiliana (Giul.) L.R.Parra & Giul. – Minas Gerais
- Comanthera brunnea Echtern. – Minas Gerais
- Comanthera caespitosa (Wikstr.) L.R.Parra & Giul. – Minas Gerais
- Comanthera centauroides (Bong.) L.R.Parra & Giul. – Pará, Minas Gerais, Mato Grosso
- Comanthera cipoensis (Ruhland) L.R.Parra & Giul. – Serra do Cipó in Minas Gerais
- Comanthera circinnata (Bong.) L.R.Parra & Giul. – Serra do Cipó in Minas Gerais
- Comanthera curralensis (Moldenke) L.R.Parra & Giul. – Bahia
- Comanthera dealbata (Silveira) L.R.Parra & Giul. – Minas Gerais
- Comanthera elegans (Bong.) L.R.Parra & Giul. – Minas Gerais
- Comanthera elegantula (Ruhland) L.R.Parra & Giul. – Minas Gerais
- Comanthera euschemus (Ruhland) L.R.Parra & Giul. – Pará, Goiás
- Comanthera floccosa (Moldenke) L.R.Parra & Giul. – Bahia
- Comanthera gandarela Echtern. & R.Ramos – Minas Gerais
- Comanthera giuliettiae L.R.Parra – Bahia
- Comanthera harleyi (Moldenke) L.R.Parra & Giul. – Bahia
- Comanthera hatschbachii (Moldenke) L.R.Parra & Giul. – Bahia
- Comanthera imbricata (Körn.) L.R.Parra & Giul. – Bahia
- Comanthera jenmanii (Gleason) L.R.Parra & Giul. – Guyana, Venezuela
- Comanthera kegeliana (Körn.) Moldenke – Guyana, Venezuela, Suriname, Brazil
- Comanthera lanosa L.R.Parra & Giul. – Bahia
- Comanthera magnifica (Giul.) L.R.Parra & Giul. – Minas Gerais
- Comanthera mucugensis (Giul.) L.R.Parra & Giul. – Bahia
- Comanthera nitida (Bong.) L.R.Parra & Giul. – Minas Gerais, Rio de Janeiro
- Comanthera nivea (Bong.) L.R.Parra & Giul. – southeastern Brazil
- Comanthera paepalophylla (Silveira) L.R.Parra & Giul. – Bahia, Minas Gerais
- Comanthera pignalii Echtern. – Bahia
- Comanthera reflexa (Gleason) L.R.Parra & Giul. – Colombia, Venezuela, Brazil
- Comanthera retroflexa L.R.Parra & Giul. – Bahia
- Comanthera rupprechtiana (Körn.) L.R.Parra & Giul. – Minas Gerais
- Comanthera suberosa (Giul.) L.R.Parra & Giul. – Minas Gerais
- Comanthera tricostata (Gleason) Echtern. – Guyana and southern Venezuela
- Comanthera xeranthemoides (Bong.) L.R.Parra & Giul. – Bolivia, Venezuela, Colombia, Guyana, Brazil
