= Trimerodytes balteatus =

Conservation status
- Data Deficient (IUCN 3.1)

Scientific classification
- Kingdom: Animalia
- Phylum: Chordata
- Class: Reptilia
- Order: Squamata
- Suborder: Serpentes
- Family: Colubridae
- Genus: Trimerodytes
- Species: T. balteatus

Binomial name
- Trimerodytes balteatus Cope, 1895

Species of snake

The Hainan mountain keelback (Trimerodytes balteatus) is a species of snake in the family Colubridae. It is found in Vietnam and China.
