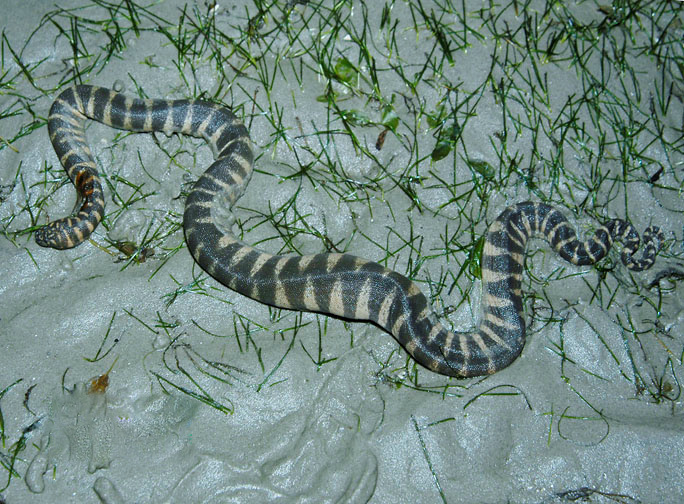

Conservation status
- Least Concern (IUCN 3.1)

Scientific classification
- Kingdom: Animalia
- Phylum: Chordata
- Class: Reptilia
- Order: Squamata
- Suborder: Serpentes
- Family: Acrochordidae
- Genus: Acrochordus
- Species: A. granulatus

Binomial name
- Acrochordus granulatus (Schneider, 1799)

Synonyms
- [Hydrus] Granulatus – Schneider, 1799; [Anguis] Granulatus vel Acrochordus – Scheider, 1801; [Anguis] Granulatus – Scheider, 1801; Acrochordus Fasciatus – Shaw, 1802; Pelamis granulatus – Daudin, 1803; Chersydrus [fasciatus] – Cuvier, 1817; [Chersydrus] granulatus – Merrem, 1820; C[hersydreas]. granulatus – Gray, 1825; Chersydrus annulatus – Gray, 1849; Potamophis fasciata – Schmidt, 1852; Chersydrus fasciatus – Duméril, Bibron & Duméril, 1854; Acrochordus fasciatus – Schlegel, 1872; Chersydrus granulatus – Boulenger, 1893; [Chersydrus] g[ranulatus]. granulatus – Loveridge, 1938; Chersydrus granulatus luzonensis – Loveridge, 1938

= Acrochordus granulatus =

Species of snake

Acrochordus granulatus is a snake species found from India through Southeast Asia to the Solomon Islands. It is known as the banded wart snake, zebra file snake, marine file snake, and zebra wart snake. It is completely aquatic and almost helpless on land. No subspecies are currently recognized.

== Description ==
Acrochordus granulatus is the smallest of the three members of the family Acrochordidae, and is commonly called the "zebra file snake". Acrochordus granulatus is also the only Acrochord that permanently inhabits estuaries as well as coastal seas--hence its other common name, the "marine file snake". All members of Acrochordus are completely aquatic and nearly helpless on land, with the exception of A. granulatus. The file snake has hygroscopic skin that retards desiccation, allowing it to travel out of water.

As with the other members of the genus, Acrochordus granulatus has uniquely spinose scales with an almost rough texture. Members of Acrochordus also possess specialized tubercles with nerve endings on the skin between their scales which provide an extra sensory organ used to feel water movements of prey. Acrochordus granulatus also have laterally compressed tails, and they can flatten dorsoventrally to assist in swimming. Acrochordus granulatus are the most marine of the Acrochordidae and have specialized sublingual salt glands similar to those found in the true sea snake subfamily Hydrophiinae. Despite this, they are still susceptible to dehydration at sea and rely on freshwater lenses built up on the surface of marine water for freshwater. Members of the true sea snake subfamily Hydrophiinae have been shown to exhibit this same behavior. Acrochordus granulatus are sexually divergent, with females being slightly larger than males.

== Geographic range ==
Found from both coasts of peninsular India though Southeast Asia, the Indo-Australian Archipelago and northern Australia to the Solomon Islands. This includes Bangladesh, Myanmar, Sri Lanka, the Andaman and Nicobar Islands, Thailand, Cambodia, Vietnam, China (Hainan), the Philippines (Luzon, Cebu and Batayan), Malaysia, Indonesia (Sumatra, Java, Borneo, Flores, Timor, Sulawesi, Ternate, Ambon, and coastal Irian Jaya), Papua New Guinea, the Solomon Islands the coast along northern Australia (Northern Territory and eastern Queensland). No type locality was given with the original description, although Smith (1943) gives "India" and Saint-Girons (1972) gives "Inde."

== Feeding ==
Harold Voris reports field studies revealing a diet of Gobiodei, Eleotridae, Trypauchenidae, small crustaceans and snails in the straits of Malacca. Due to the species' extensive range, the diet likely varies regionally. In captivity they have been known fairly non-preferential to take a variety of fish.
