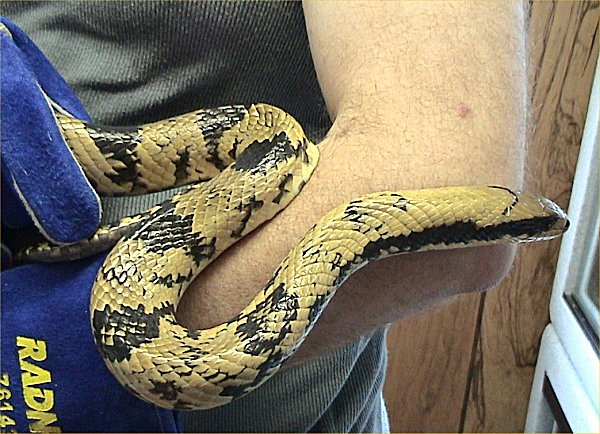
- Hydrodynastes gigas

Scientific classification
- Kingdom: Animalia
- Phylum: Chordata
- Class: Reptilia
- Order: Squamata
- Suborder: Serpentes
- Family: Colubridae
- Subfamily: Dipsadinae
- Genus: Hydrodynastes; Fitzinger, 1843

= Hydrodynastes =

Genus of snakes

Hydrodynastes is a small genus of large colubrid snakes in the subfamily Dipsadinae. The genus is endemic to South America.

== Species ==
Two species are recognized:

- Hydrodynastes bicinctus (Herrmann, 1804)
- Hydrodynastes gigas (A.M.C. Duméril, Bibron & A.H.A. Duméril, 1854)
