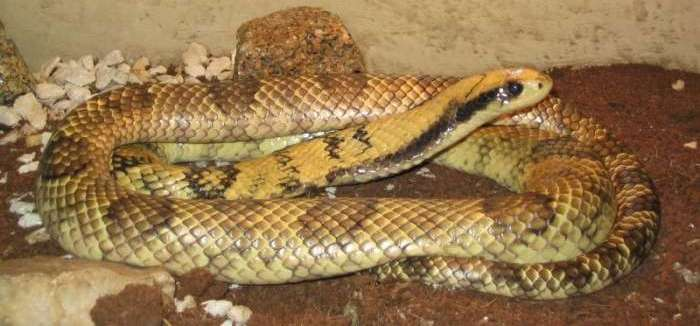

Conservation status
- Least Concern (IUCN 3.1)
- CITES Appendix II

Scientific classification
- Kingdom: Animalia
- Phylum: Chordata
- Class: Reptilia
- Order: Squamata
- Suborder: Serpentes
- Family: Colubridae
- Genus: Hydrodynastes
- Species: H. gigas

Binomial name
- Hydrodynastes gigas (A.M.C. Duméril, Bibron & A.H.A. Duméril, 1854)

Synonyms
- Xenodon gigas A.M.C. Duméril, Bibron & A.H.A. Duméril, 1854; Cyclagras gigas — Cope, 1885; Hydrodynastes gigas — Hoge, 1966; Hydrodynastes melanogigas Franco, Fernandes & Bentim, 2007

= Hydrodynastes gigas =

Species of snake

Hydrodynastes gigas is a New World species of large dipsadine snake endemic to South America. Aglyphous snake with enlarged posterior maxillary teeth, not grooved, associated with Duvernoy's gland secretions. endemic to South America. Common names include false cobra, false water cobra, South American water cobra, and Brazilian smooth snake. It is also sometimes referred to as boipevaçu, ñacaniná or yacaniná, from the Guarani ñakanina ('alert head'), mboi-peba, surucucu-do-pantanal, and víbora ladradora ('barking snake').

A mildly venomous species, the false water cobra is so named because when it is threatened, it "hoods" as a true cobra (genus Naja) does. Unlike a true cobra, however, it does not rear up, but instead remains horizontal. No valid subspecies are currently recognized.

== Description ==
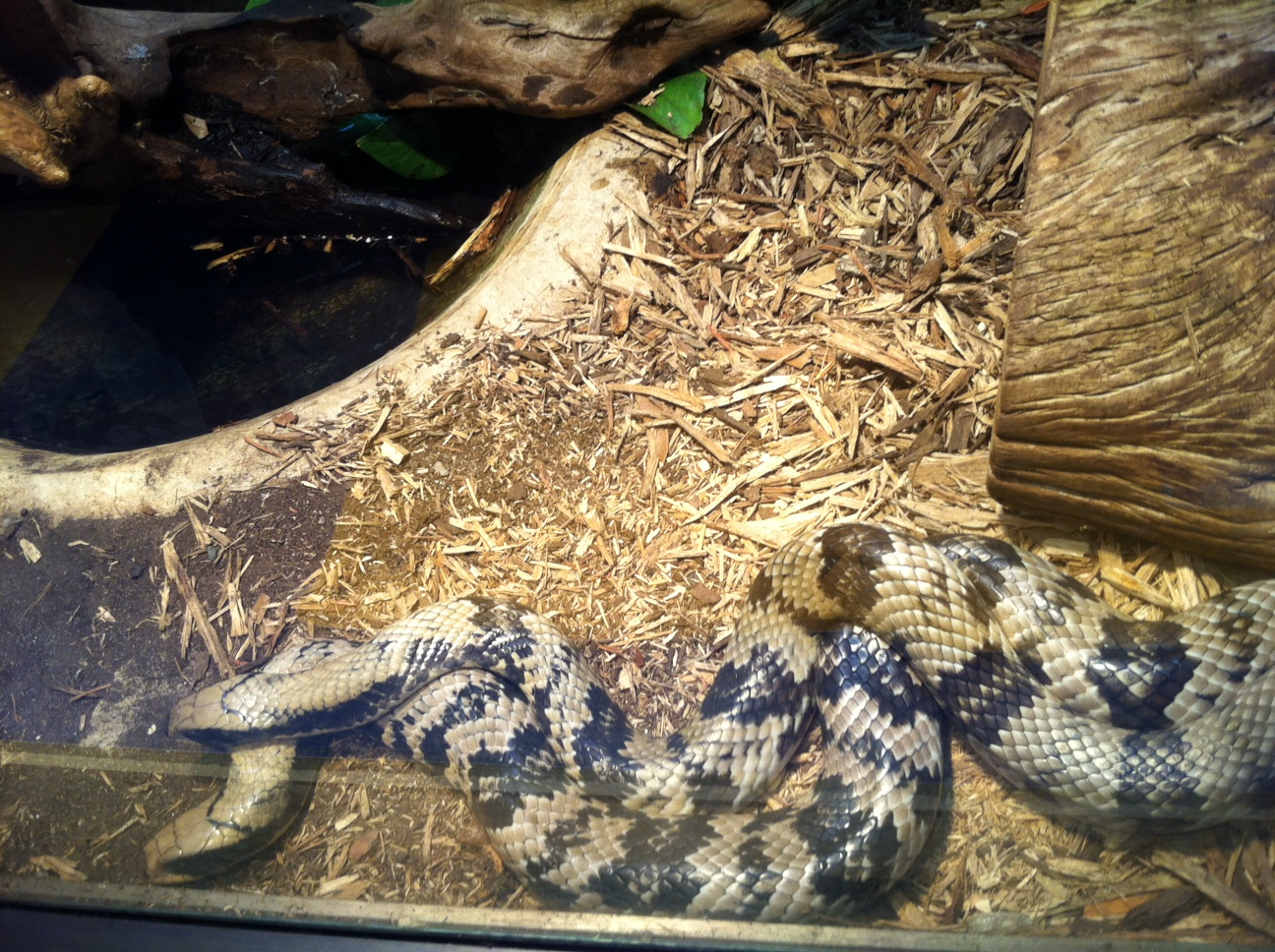
A pair of specimens on display at the National Zoological Park, Washington, DC

H. gigas is a large dipsadine snake that may exceed 3 m (10 ft) in length, with most adult specimens reaching about 2 m (7 ft) in length. The average weight is around 1.6 kg (3.5 lb), but some mature specimens can weigh up to 4.5 kg (9.9 lb). This species exhibits sexual dimorphism, with males being much smaller than females. The common name false water cobra is an allusion to its ability to flatten its neck, similar to a cobra, as a defensive reaction to make it look larger and more intimidating. Unlike the true cobra, though, the false water cobra stays in a horizontal position when it hoods, rather than rearing into a vertical position. H. gigas can flatten not only its neck, but also lower down its body, which is not possible for a true cobra.

Additionally, the pattern and coloration of this Hydrodynastes species superficially resemble those of true water cobras (Boulengerina). The false water cobra has large eyes with circular pupils, allowing good daytime vision. The tongue is black.

The background colour of a mature specimen is an olive green or brown, with dark spots and bands covering much of its body. The background coloring and banding generally become darker towards the tail. This colouring gives the false water cobra effective camouflage in its natural rainforest environment. The ventral scales are yellow or brown, spotted with dark flecks that make three dotted lines that appear to merge as they approach the tail. Females are brown ventrally, whilst males are yellow. Females are suggested to have lighter bands and markings on their bodies. This is not an effective way of judging the sex of H. gigas, as coloring differs slightly among all individuals. Hatchlings and juveniles are much darker in coloration and do not have the typical dark eyes of the adults. They more resemble a garter or water snake than their mature counterparts. In captivity, hypomelanistic animals have been produced. These animals vary in coloration, from some having only slightly lighter colored saddles to those that are almost patternless. A melanistic population found in Tocantins in central Brazil was originally described as a new species of Hydrodynastes (H. melanogigas), but genetic evidence indicates that this population is simply a melanistic variant of H. gigas.

== Geographic range ==
H. gigas is found from eastern Bolivia to southern Brazil, and in Paraguay and Argentina.

== Habitat ==
H. gigas generally prefers wet or humid areas such as marshlands and tropical rainforests. However, it has also been observed in dryer areas. This preference for wetland habitats contributes to its common name of false "water" cobra.

== Behavior ==
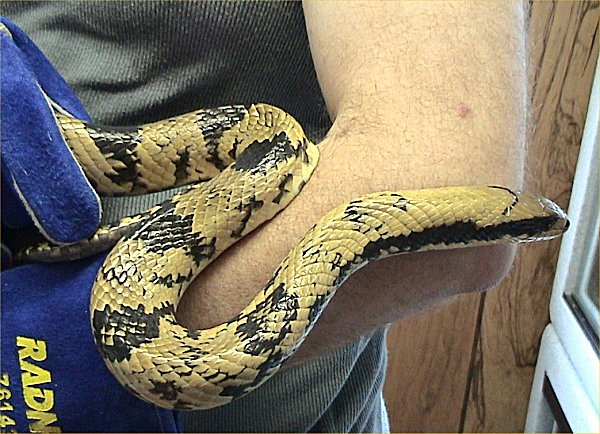
A specimen kept as a pet

H. gigas is primarily a diurnal species. It is also a very active and inquisitive snake, which spends much of the day climbing, burrowing, and swimming. Temperaments can vary considerably among specimens; some are docile, while others are more defensive or even outright aggressive.

Many specimens are maintained in captivity, and some are even kept as pets. Captive-bred specimens can become quite tame and trusting, and many exhibit a high level of intelligence.

== Feeding ==
In the wild, H. gigas primarily feeds on fish and amphibians, but will also eat small mammals, birds, and reptiles. In captivity, they can be introduced to other types of food, as well.

== Venom ==
H. gigas is a dipsadid snake with aglyphous dentition. The posterior maxillary teeth are somewhat enlarged and differentiated compared to the anterior teeth and are associated with a Duvernoy's gland that produces biologically active oral secretions with proteolytic activity. The liquid venom yield ranges from 0 to 50 microliters and the solid venom yield is 1.3 mg.

Although there have been many bite cases, there are only four reported cases of significant reaction in humans from this species. Symptoms after envenomation in those cases include severe swelling, bruising, numbness, itching, dizziness. Most bites report only mild local pain and minor swelling. Manning et al. (1999) described a case in which an 18-year-old male pet-store employee was bitten on the wrist by a specimen that hung on for 1.5 minutes. Some mild local swelling resulted, and after nine hours, the victim claimed to have experienced three bouts of muscle paralysis, during which he fell and was unable to move or speak. The medical examination revealed no evidence of systemic envenomation however.

== Taxonomy ==
This species was once considered to constitute a single monotypic genus, Cyclagras.
