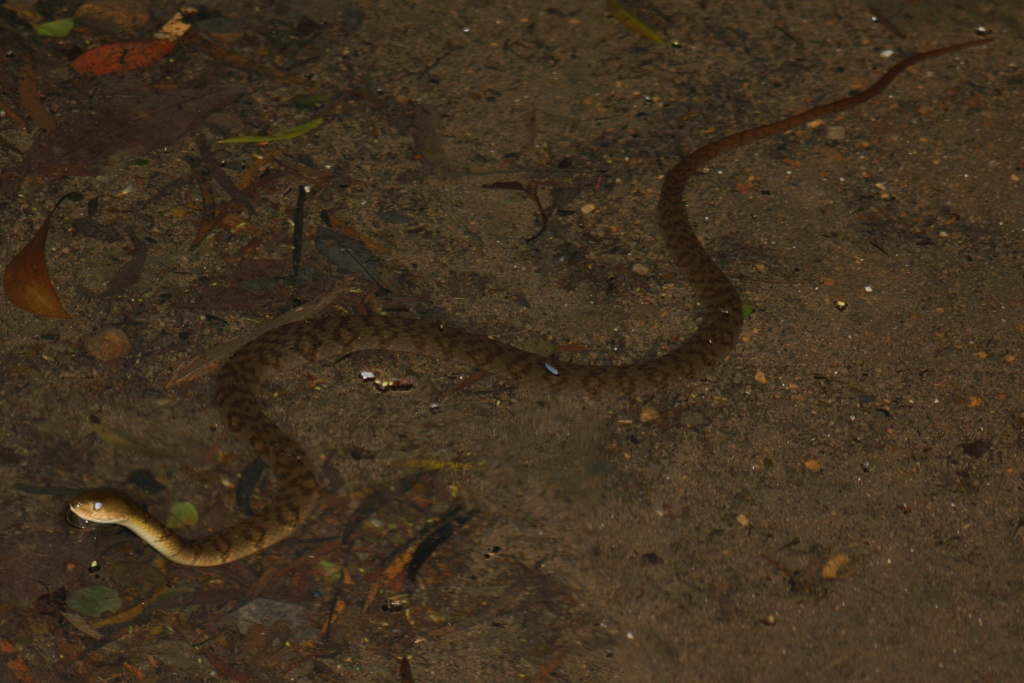
- Trimerodytes percarinatus

Scientific classification
- Kingdom: Animalia
- Phylum: Chordata
- Class: Reptilia
- Order: Squamata
- Suborder: Serpentes
- Family: Colubridae
- Subfamily: Natricinae
- Genus: Trimerodytes; Cope, 1895

Synonyms
- Sinonatrix

= Trimerodytes =

Genus of snakes

Trimerodytes is a genus of snakes in the subfamily Natricinae of the family Colubridae. The genus is endemic to East Asia and Southeast Asia.

== Species ==
The genus Trimerodytes contains 7 species which are recognized as being valid.

- Trimerodytes aequifasciatus (Barbour, 1908) – Asiatic annulate keelback, Asiatic water snake
- Trimerodytes annularis (Hallowell, 1856) – red-bellied annulate keelback, ringed water snake
- Trimerodytes balteatus Cope, 1895 – Hainan mountain keelback
- Trimerodytes percarinatus (Boulenger, 1899) – eastern water snake, olive keelback, olive annulate keelback, Chinese keelback water snake
- Trimerodytes praemaxillaris (Angel, 1929) – Angel's mountain keelback, brown stream snake
- Trimerodytes yapingi (Guo, Zhu & Liu, 2019) – Jingdong water snake
- Trimerodytes yunnanensis (Rao & Yang, 1998) – Yunnan water snake, Yunnan annulate keelback

Nota bene: A binomial authority in parentheses indicates that the species was originally described in a genus other than Trimerodytes.
