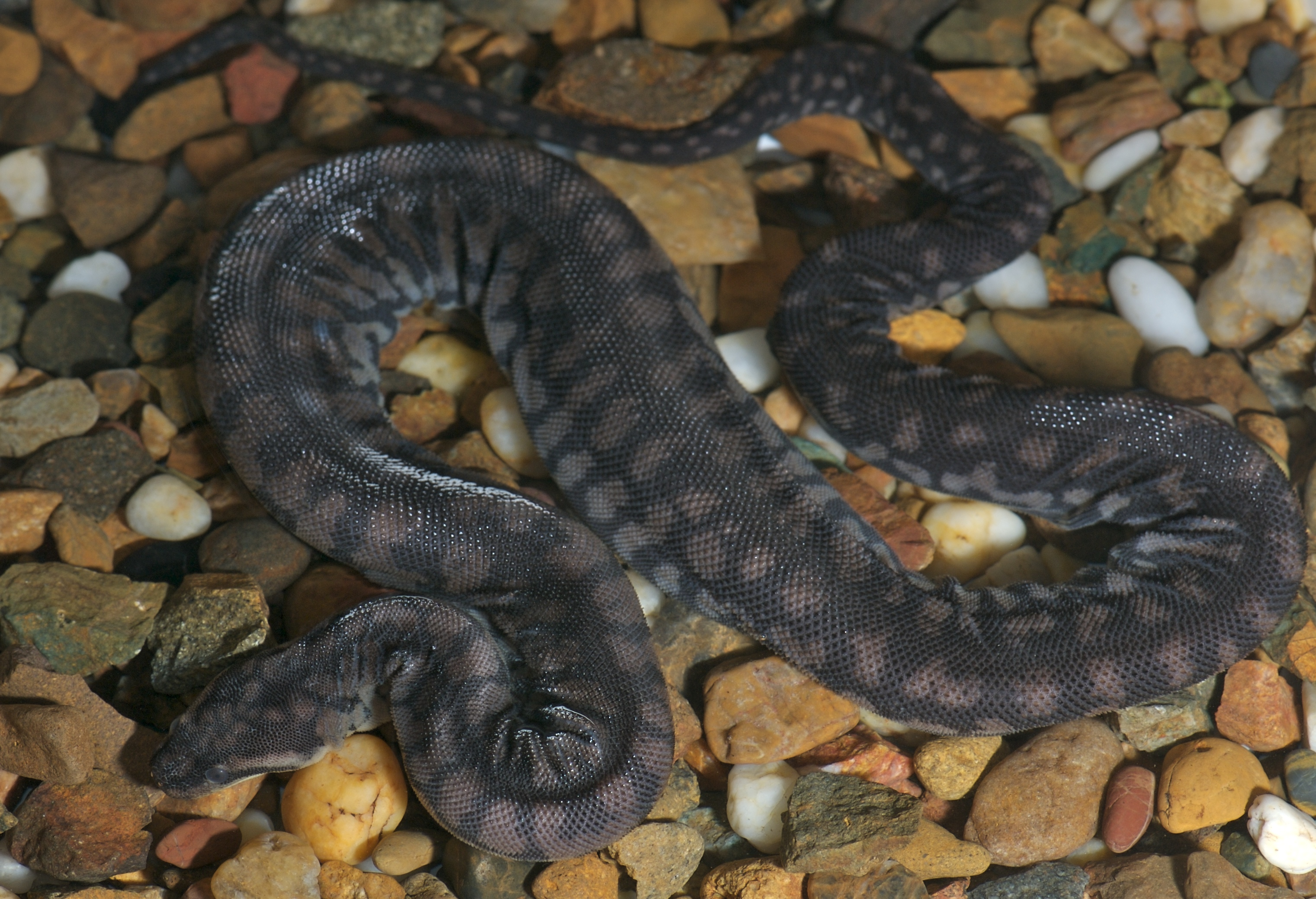

Conservation status
- Least Concern (IUCN 3.1)

Scientific classification
- Domain: Eukaryota
- Kingdom: Animalia
- Phylum: Chordata
- Class: Reptilia
- Order: Squamata
- Suborder: Serpentes
- Family: Acrochordidae
- Genus: Acrochordus
- Species: A. arafurae

Binomial name
- Acrochordus arafurae McDowell, 1979

Synonyms
- Acrochordus javanicus – Boulenger, 1893; Acrochordus javanicus – Flower, 1899; Acrochordus javanicus – Wall, 1903; Acrochordus javanicus – Lidth de Jeude, 1911; Acrochordus javanicus – Barbour, 1812; Acrochordus javanicus – Boulenger, 1914; Acrochordus javanicus – de Rooij, 1917; Acrochordus javanicus – Kinghorn, 1929; Acrochordus javanicus – Thomson, 1935; Acrochordus javanicus – Barrett, 1950; Acrochordus javanicus – De Haas, 1950; Achrochordus javanicus – Mitchell, 1955; Acrochordus javanicus – Kinghorn, 1956; Acrochordus javanicus – Worrell, 1963; Achrochordus javanicus – Cogger, 1964; Acrochordus javanicus – Mitchell, 1964; Acrochordus javanicus – Dunson & Dunson, 1973; Acrochordus javanicus – Cogger, 1975; Acrochordus arafurae – McDowell, 1979

= Acrochordus arafurae =

Species of snake

Acrochordus arafurae, known by the common names Arafura file snake, elephant trunk snake, and wrinkle file snake, is an aquatic snake species found in northern Australia and New Guinea. No subspecies are currently recognized.

This snake was first described by Samuel Booker McDowell in 1979

== Description ==
Adults grow to 8.25 ft (2.5 m) in length. They have very loose skin and are known to prey on large fish, such as eel-tailed catfish. Females are usually larger than males and they have been known to give birth to up to 17 young. The skin is used to make drums in New Guinea.

== In Aboriginal language and culture ==
Arafura file snakes are often hunted by indigenous peoples of Northern Australia.

In the Kunwinjku language of West Arnhem Land, the snakes are known as kedjebe (or bekka in Eastern dialects), while in the Yolŋu language of East Arnhem Land they are called djaykuŋ, among other names.
