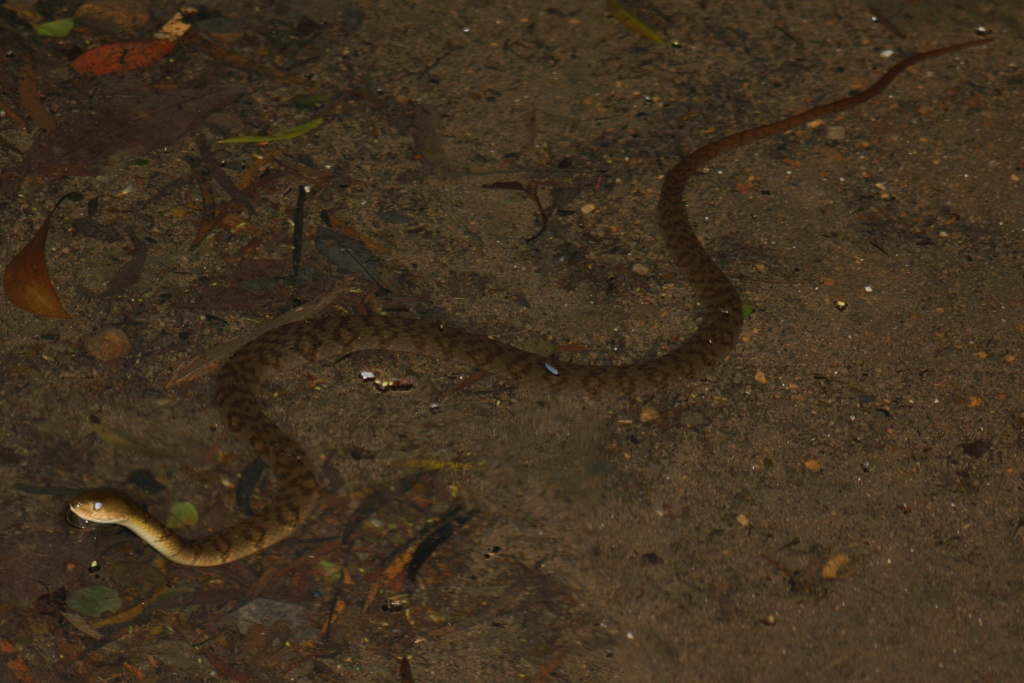

Conservation status
- Least Concern (IUCN 3.1)

Scientific classification
- Kingdom: Animalia
- Phylum: Chordata
- Class: Reptilia
- Order: Squamata
- Suborder: Serpentes
- Family: Colubridae
- Genus: Trimerodytes
- Species: T. percarinatus

Binomial name
- Trimerodytes percarinatus (Boulenger, 1899)

Synonyms
- Tropidonotus percarinatus Boulenger, 1899; Natrix percarinata — Mell, 1931; Natrix annularis percarinata — Bourret, 1936; Natrix percarinata — M.A. Smith, 1943; Sinonatrix percarinata Rossman & Eberle, 1977

= Trimerodytes percarinatus =

Species of snake

Trimerodytes percarinatus, commonly known as the eastern water snake, olive keelback, olive annulate keelback or Chinese keelback water snake, is a species of snake in the subfamily Natricinae.

== Taxonomy ==
The type locality for T. percarinatus is Guadun (formerly spelled as Kuatun), Wuyishan City (former Chongan County) in NW Fujian, China.

== Subspecies ==
The subspecies Trimerodytes percarinatus suriki is endemic to Taiwan where it occurs in the whole country.

== Description ==
T. percarinatus is a defensive snake that bites readily when caught, but it is not venomous. It is a medium-sized snake, typically attaining a total length (including tail) of 70–90 cm (28–35 in), but may grow up to 110 cm (43 in). An adult female usually lays 4 to 13 eggs, but may lay as many as 25 eggs.

== Distribution and habitat ==
T. percarinatus is found in NE India (Changlang District, Arunachal Pradesh), Myanmar (= Burma), Thailand, Laos, Vietnam, S China (Hainan, Zhejiang, Jiangxi, Fujian, Guangdong, Guangxi, Guizhou, Sichuan, Hubei), Hong Kong, and Taiwan. It is an aquatic species associated with hilly areas.

== Diet ==
T. percarinatus preys on shrimps, frogs (including tadpoles), and fish.
