= Comanthera elegans =

Scientific classification
- Kingdom: Plantae
- Clade: Tracheophytes
- Clade: Angiosperms
- Clade: Monocots
- Clade: Commelinids
- Order: Poales
- Family: Eriocaulaceae
- Genus: Comanthera
- Species: C. elegans

Binomial name
- Comanthera elegans (Bong.) L.R.Parra & Giul 2010

Synonyms
- Eriocaulon elegans Bong.; Dupatya elegans (Bong.) Kuntze; Paepalanthus elegans (Bong.) Kunth; Syngonanthus elegans (Bong.) Ruhland; Syngonanthus barbatus Silveira

Species of flowering plant

Comanthera elegans is a species of flowering plant found in Minas Gerais, Brazil.
