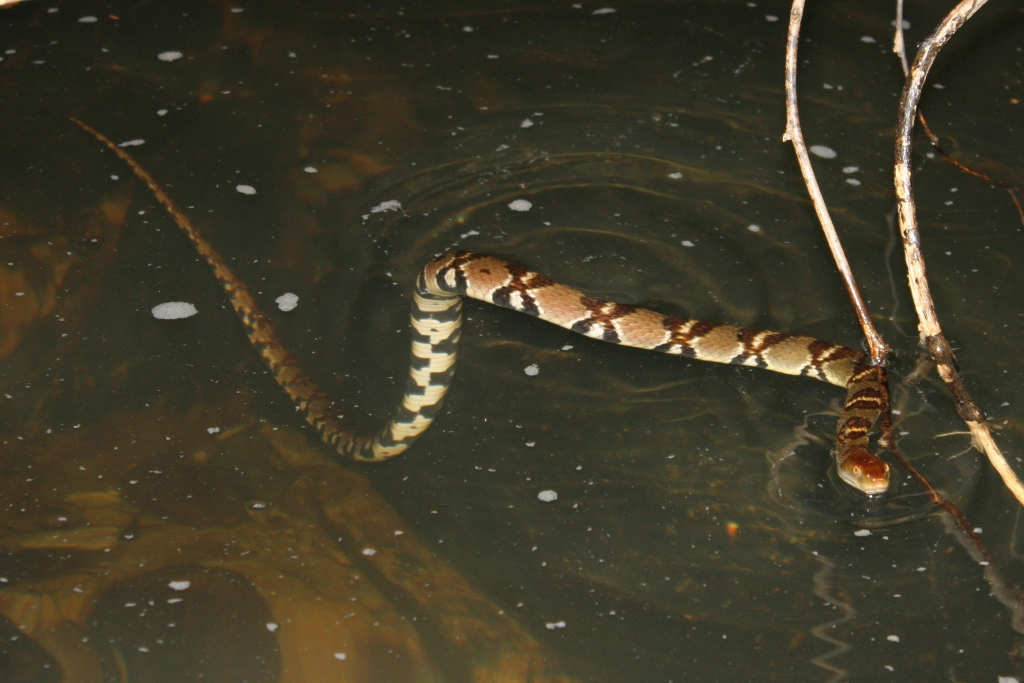

Conservation status
- Least Concern (IUCN 3.1)

Scientific classification
- Kingdom: Animalia
- Phylum: Chordata
- Class: Reptilia
- Order: Squamata
- Suborder: Serpentes
- Family: Colubridae
- Genus: Trimerodytes
- Species: T. aequifasciatus

Binomial name
- Trimerodytes aequifasciatus (Barbour, 1908)

Synonyms
- Natrix aequifasciata Barbour, 1908; Sinonatrix aequifasciata (Barbour, 1908)

= Trimerodytes aequifasciatus =

Species of snake

Trimerodytes aequifasciatus, the Asiatic annulate keelback or Asiatic water snake, is a species of snake in the family Colubridae. It is found in Laos, southern China, Hong Kong. and Vietnam.
