= Claës Fredrik Hornstedt =

Swedish naturalist, taxonomist and botanical illustrator

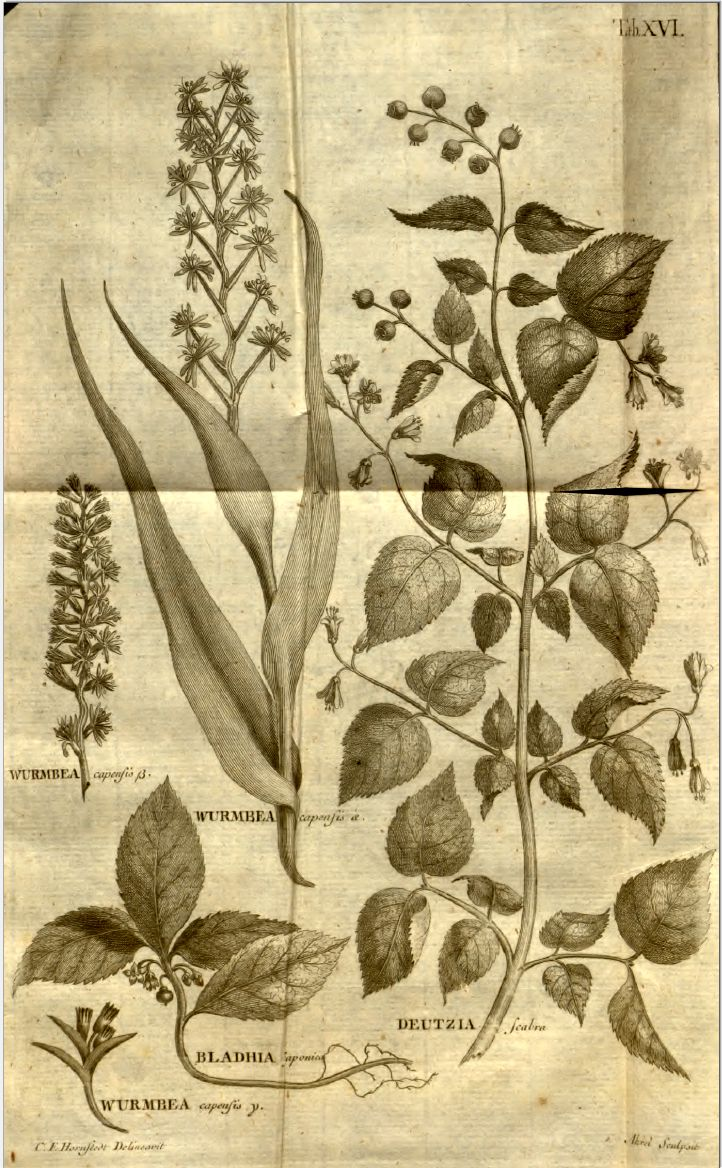
Botanical illustration by Hornstedt Plate 16 from Nova genera plantarum

Claës Fredrik Hornstedt (12 February 1758 Linköping – May 1809 Helsinki) was a Swedish naturalist, taxonomist, botanical illustrator and a protégé of Carl Peter Thunberg.

Hornstedt received a thorough education in natural history at the University of Uppsala. His 1781 dissertation dealt with plants collected in Japan by his teacher and mentor, Thunberg. At the invitation of Thunberg he set off in 1783 for Batavia, capital of the Dutch colonial empire, from Göteborg, boarding the “Sophia Magdalena”, a ship belonging to the Swedish East India Company. Supported by the Batavian Society of Arts and Sciences, he began collecting natural history specimens, mounted expeditions to the interior and neighbouring islands, and learnt the Malay language and Mandarin. His letters show a growing disaffection with the European way of life and its prodigality. He wore Chinese clothing, ate Chinese food and frequented the Chinese quarter.

Hornstedt left Java in August 1784, suffering the after-effects of malaria and jaundice, but even so managed to return with an impressive collection of natural history and ethnological objects. His collection also contained a set of medical drawings based on a Japanese medical text. These drawings were given to him by Isaac Titsingh who had come back to Batavia after his second trip to the East India Company's Station at Dejima.

After brief visits to the Netherlands, France and Denmark in 1786, he studied for a degree in medicine at the German University of Greifswald. Once back in Sweden he was appointed counselor and lecturer in Natural History at the museum in Linköping in 1787. He enlisted in the Swedish navy in 1796, and became a prisoner of war in the Swedish-Russian War of 1808. He then became head physician at a Russian lazaret on Sveaborg Fortress.

. The plant genus Hornstedtia in the family Zingiberaceae is named in his honour.

== Publications ==
- Granroth, C. (editor), 2008. C.F. Hornstedt, Brev fran Batavia: En resa till Ostindien 1782-1786. Helsingfors, Svenska Litteratursallskapet i Finland and Stockholm, Atlantis: pp. 1-418 - ISBN 9173532606
