= List of Paepalanthus species =

List of flowering plant species

Paepalanthus is a genus of flowering plants in the family Eriocaulaceae. As of July 2026 Plants of the World Online accepts 460 species native to the tropical and subtropical Americas, tropical Africa, and Madagascar.

== A ==
- Paepalanthus acantholimon Ruhland
- Paepalanthus acanthophyllus Ruhland
- Paepalanthus accrescens Silveira
- Paepalanthus actinocephaloides Silveira
- Paepalanthus aculeatus Silveira
- Paepalanthus acuminatus Ruhland
- Paepalanthus acutipilus Silveira
- Paepalanthus aequalis (Vell.) J.F.Macbr.
- Paepalanthus aereus Silveira
- Paepalanthus aggregatus (F.N.Costa) Christenh. & Byng
- Paepalanthus albiceps Silveira
- Paepalanthus albidus Gardner
- Paepalanthus albotomentosus Herzog
- Paepalanthus albovaginatus Silveira
- Paepalanthus albovillosus Silveira
- Paepalanthus aleurophyllus Trovó
- Paepalanthus allemanii Diogo
- Paepalanthus almasensis Moldenke
- Paepalanthus alpestris (Körn.) Tissot-Sq.
- Paepalanthus alpinus Körn.
- Paepalanthus alsinoides C.Wright
- Paepalanthus altamirensis Tissot-Sq. & Sauthier
- Paepalanthus amoenus (Bong.) Körn.
- Paepalanthus amphibius Trovó
- Paepalanthus anamariae Hensold
- Paepalanthus anceps (Walter) Christenh. & Byng
- Paepalanthus andicola Körn.
- Paepalanthus archeri Moldenke
- Paepalanthus arcuatus Trovó
- Paepalanthus arenicola Silveira
- Paepalanthus aretioides Ruhland
- Paepalanthus argenteus (Bong.) Körn.
- Paepalanthus argillicola Silveira
- Paepalanthus argyrolinon Körn.
- Paepalanthus argyropus Silveira
- Paepalanthus argyrotrychus F.N.Costa, Andrino & Echtern.
- Paepalanthus aristatus Moldenke
- Paepalanthus armeria Mart. ex Körn.
- Paepalanthus ascendens Silveira
- Paepalanthus asper Silveira
- Paepalanthus ater Silveira
- Paepalanthus atratus (Moldenke) L.E.F.Silva & Trovó
- Paepalanthus atrovaginatus Ruhland
- Paepalanthus augustus Silveira
- Paepalanthus aulociliatus Sauthier & Tissot-Sq.
- Paepalanthus aureus Silveira
- Paepalanthus avacanoeiro Trovó & R.Silva-Oliveira

== B ==
- Paepalanthus babyloniensis Silveira
- Paepalanthus bahiensis (Bong.) Kunth
- Paepalanthus balansae Ruhland
- Paepalanthus baraunensis Silveira
- Paepalanthus barbiger Silveira
- Paepalanthus barbulatus Herzog
- Paepalanthus barreirensis Silveira
- Paepalanthus batatalensis Silveira
- Paepalanthus belizensis Moldenke
- Paepalanthus bellus Moldenke
- Paepalanthus benedicti Silveira
- Paepalanthus beyrichianus (Sporl. ex Körn.) Christenh. & Byng
- Paepalanthus bifidus (Schrad. ex Schult.) Kunth
- Paepalanthus blepharophorus (Bong.) Kunth
- Paepalanthus bombacinus Silveira
- Paepalanthus bongardii Kunth
- Paepalanthus bonsai Trovó & Sano
- Paepalanthus bosseri (Morat) Stützel
- Paepalanthus brachyphyllus Ruhland
- Paepalanthus brachypus (Bong.) Kunth
- Paepalanthus brevicaulis Silveira
- Paepalanthus brevis Trovó
- Paepalanthus bromelioides Silveira
- Paepalanthus brunnescens Ruhland
- Paepalanthus bryoides (Riedel ex Bong.) Kunth
- Paepalanthus bulbosus Silveira
- Paepalanthus burle-marxii Trovó

== C ==
- Paepalanthus cabralensis Silveira
- Paepalanthus cachambuensis Silveira
- Paepalanthus cacuminis Ruhland
- Paepalanthus caespititius Mart. ex Körn.
- Paepalanthus caldensis Malme
- Paepalanthus callophyllus Silveira
- Paepalanthus calvescens L.E.F.Silva & Trovó
- Paepalanthus calvulus (Ruhland) Hensold
- Paepalanthus calvus Körn.
- Paepalanthus campanulatus Trovó
- Paepalanthus camptophyllus Ruhland
- Paepalanthus canastrensis Silveira
- Paepalanthus candidus Silveira
- Paepalanthus canescens (Bong.) Körn.
- Paepalanthus capanemae Silveira
- Paepalanthus caparoensis Ruhland
- Paepalanthus capillaris (Bong.) Körn.
- Paepalanthus capillatus Silveira
- Paepalanthus capillifolius Moldenke
- Paepalanthus capitatus Silveira
- Paepalanthus capito Körn.
- Paepalanthus capixaba Trovó, Fraga & Sano
- Paepalanthus carvalhoi Giul. & E.B.Miranda
- Paepalanthus caryonauta Hensold
- Paepalanthus cassiae Trovó
- Paepalanthus castaneus Silveira
- Paepalanthus catharinae Ruhland
- Paepalanthus celsus Tissot-Sq.
- Paepalanthus cephalotrichus Silveira
- Paepalanthus chaseae Moldenke
- Paepalanthus chiapensis Moldenke
- Paepalanthus chiquitensis Herzog
- Paepalanthus chlorocephalus Silveira
- Paepalanthus chloronema Silveira
- Paepalanthus chlorophyllus Silveira
- Paepalanthus chloropus Silveira
- Paepalanthus chrysolepis Silveira
- Paepalanthus ciliatus (Bong.) Kunth
- Paepalanthus ciliolatus Ruhland
- Paepalanthus cinereus Giul. & L.R.Parra
- Paepalanthus cipoensis Silveira
- Paepalanthus clausenii Hensold
- Paepalanthus claussenianus Körn.
- Paepalanthus coloides Ruhland
- Paepalanthus comans Silveira
- Paepalanthus compactus Gardner
- Paepalanthus complanatus Silveira
- Paepalanthus conduplicatus Körn.
- Paepalanthus conjunctus Trovó
- Paepalanthus contasensis Moldenke
- Paepalanthus cordatus Ruhland
- Paepalanthus corymbosus (Bong.) Kunth
- Paepalanthus costaricensis Moldenke ex Standl.
- Paepalanthus coutoensis Moldenke
- Paepalanthus crassicaulis Körn.
- Paepalanthus crateriformis Silveira
- Paepalanthus crinitus Tissot-Sq.
- Paepalanthus cristatus Moldenke
- Paepalanthus cryocephalus Silveira
- Paepalanthus cubensis (Ruhland) Christenh. & Byng
- Paepalanthus cupreus Sauthier & Tissot-Sq.
- Paepalanthus cururensis Moldenke
- Paepalanthus cuspidatus Silveira

== D ==
- Paepalanthus dasynema Ruhland
- Paepalanthus decumbens Trovó & Picanço
- Paepalanthus decussus Körn.
- Paepalanthus deflexus (F.N.Costa) Christenh. & Byng
- Paepalanthus delicatus (Sano) Christenh. & Byng
- Paepalanthus dendroides (Kunth) Kunth
- Paepalanthus denudatus Körn.
- Paepalanthus desperado Ruhland
- Paepalanthus diamantinensis Moldenke
- Paepalanthus dianthoides Mart. ex Körn.
- Paepalanthus dichotomus Klotzsch ex Körn.
- Paepalanthus dichromolepis Silveira
- Paepalanthus diffissus Moldenke
- Paepalanthus diffusus Silveira
- Paepalanthus digitiformis Hensold
- Paepalanthus digynus (Körn.) Christenh. & Byng
- Paepalanthus diplobetor Ruhland
- Paepalanthus distichophyllus Mart.
- Paepalanthus divaricatus (Bong.) Kunth
- Paepalanthus diversifolius Silveira
- Paepalanthus dupatya Mart. ex Körn.

== E ==
- Paepalanthus echinoides Trovó
- Paepalanthus ekmanii (Ruhland) Christenh. & Byng
- Paepalanthus elatissimus Silveira
- Paepalanthus elatus (Bong.) Körn.
- Paepalanthus elongatus (Bong.) Körn.
- Paepalanthus engleri (Ruhland) Christenh. & Byng
- Paepalanthus ensifolius (Kunth) Kunth
- Paepalanthus erectifolius Silveira
- Paepalanthus erigeron Mart. ex Körn.
- Paepalanthus eriophaeus Ruhland
- Paepalanthus exiguus (Bong.) Körn.
- Paepalanthus extremensis Silveira

== F ==
- Paepalanthus fabianeae Andrino & Sano
- Paepalanthus falcatus (Bong.) Körn.
- Paepalanthus falcifolius Körn.
- Paepalanthus fallax Beauverd
- Paepalanthus farinaceus F.N.Costa, Andrino & Trovó
- Paepalanthus fasciculatus (Rottb.) Kunth
- Paepalanthus fasciculifer Silveira
- Paepalanthus fasciculoides Hensold
- Paepalanthus fastigiatus (Bong.) Körn.
- Paepalanthus ferreyrae Moldenke
- Paepalanthus ferrugineus Andrino & Echtern.
- Paepalanthus fimbriatus Silveira
- Paepalanthus flaccidus (Bong.) Kunth
- Paepalanthus flaviceps Körn.
- Paepalanthus flexuosus Trovó
- Paepalanthus fluviatilis (Aubl.) Christenh. & Byng
- Paepalanthus fonsecae Trovó & Picanço
- Paepalanthus freyreissii (Thunb.) Körn.
- Paepalanthus fuscoater Körn.

== G ==
- Paepalanthus gardnerianus Walp.
- Paepalanthus garimpensis Silveira
- Paepalanthus geniculatus (Bong.) Kunth
- Paepalanthus gentlei Moldenke
- Paepalanthus giuliettiae (Sano) Christenh. & Byng
- Paepalanthus glabrescens (Moldenke) Hensold
- Paepalanthus glabrifolius Ruhland
- Paepalanthus glareosus (Bong.) Kunth
- Paepalanthus glaucescens Körn.
- Paepalanthus glaucophyllus Silveira
- Paepalanthus glaucopodus Silveira
- Paepalanthus graminifolius (F.N.Costa) Christenh. & Byng
- Paepalanthus grao-mogolensis Silveira
- Paepalanthus guaraiensis Moldenke

== H ==
- Paepalanthus harleyi Moldenke
- Paepalanthus harmsii Ruhland
- Paepalanthus henriquei Silveira & Ruhland
- Paepalanthus herzogii Moldenke
- Paepalanthus heterocaulon Silveira
- Paepalanthus heteropus Silveira
- Paepalanthus heterotrichus Silveira
- Paepalanthus hilairei Körn.
- Paepalanthus hippotrichophyllus Herzog
- Paepalanthus hirtellus Trovó, Echtern. & Sano
- Paepalanthus homomallus (Bong.) Mart. ex Körn.
- Paepalanthus huancabambensis Hensold
- Paepalanthus hydra Ruhland

== I ==
- Paepalanthus ibitipocensis Silveira
- Paepalanthus implicatus Silveira
- Paepalanthus incanus (Bong.) Körn.
- Paepalanthus inopinatus Moldenke
- Paepalanthus insignis Silveira
- Paepalanthus intermedius Körn.
- Paepalanthus irwinii Trovó & Echtern.
- Paepalanthus itacambirensis Silveira
- Paepalanthus itambeensis Silveira
- Paepalanthus itatiaiensis Ruhland
- Paepalanthus ithyphyllus (Mart.) Walp.
- Paepalanthus itremensis (Morat) Stützel

== J – K ==
- Paepalanthus jordanensis Silveira
- Paepalanthus karstenii Ruhland
- Paepalanthus kleinii (Moldenke & L.B.Sm.) Trovó
- Paepalanthus klotzschianus Körn.
- Paepalanthus koernickeanus (Trovó & F.N.Costa) Christenh. & Byng
- Paepalanthus koernickei (Ruhland) Trovó

== L ==
- Paepalanthus lamarckii Kunth
- Paepalanthus lanatus Silveira
- Paepalanthus langsdorffii (Bong.) Körn.
- Paepalanthus latifolius Körn.
- Paepalanthus latipes Silveira
- Paepalanthus laxifolius Körn.
- Paepalanthus leiothricoides Silveira
- Paepalanthus leiseringii Ruhland
- Paepalanthus lepidus Silveira
- Paepalanthus leucoblepharus Körn.
- Paepalanthus leucocephalus Ruhland
- Paepalanthus lindenii Ruhland
- Paepalanthus linearifolius Silveira
- Paepalanthus linearilaminatus L.E.F.Silva
- Paepalanthus linearis Trovó
- Paepalanthus lingulatus (Bong.) Kunth
- Paepalanthus lodiculoides Moldenke
- Paepalanthus longibracteatus (Moldenke) Trovó
- Paepalanthus longicaulis Silveira
- Paepalanthus longiciliatus Trovó
- Paepalanthus longifolius Körn.
- Paepalanthus longivaginatus Tissot-Sq.
- Paepalanthus luetzelburgii Herzog
- Paepalanthus lundii Körn.
- Paepalanthus lychnophorellus Echtern. & Sano
- Paepalanthus lycopodioides Silveira

== M ==
- Paepalanthus macaheensis Körn.
- Paepalanthus macarenensis Moldenke
- Paepalanthus macer Trovó
- Paepalanthus macrocaulon Silveira
- Paepalanthus macrocephalus (Bong.) Körn.
- Paepalanthus macropodus Ruhland
- Paepalanthus maculatus Silveira
- Paepalanthus magalhaesii Silveira
- Paepalanthus magistrae Sano, F.N.Costa, Trovó & Echtern.
- Paepalanthus magnus L.H.Rocha, Gonella & Andrino
- Paepalanthus manicatus Poulsen ex Malme
- Paepalanthus melaleucus (Bong.) Kunth
- Paepalanthus melanolepis Silveira
- Paepalanthus melanthus Silveira
- Paepalanthus mellosilvae Trovó
- Paepalanthus mendoncianus Ruhland
- Paepalanthus meridensis Klotzsch ex Körn.
- Paepalanthus mexiae Moldenke
- Paepalanthus michaelii Silveira
- Paepalanthus microcaulon Ruhland
- Paepalanthus microphorus Silveira
- Paepalanthus microphyllus (Guill.) Kunth
- Paepalanthus milho-verdensis Silveira
- Paepalanthus minasensis Moldenke
- Paepalanthus minimus Silveira
- Paepalanthus minor (Chapm.) Christenh. & Byng
- Paepalanthus minutulus Mart. ex Körn.
- Paepalanthus miser Ruhland
- Paepalanthus moaensis Gonz.Géigel
- Paepalanthus modestus Trovó
- Paepalanthus moedensis Silveira
- Paepalanthus mollis Kunth
- Paepalanthus montanus Silveira
- Paepalanthus multicapitatus Giul. & E.B.Miranda
- Paepalanthus multistellaris Andrino & Sano
- Paepalanthus muscosus Körn.
- Paepalanthus myocephalon (Mart.) Körn.
- Paepalanthus myriothrixus Sauthier & Tissot-Sq.

== N ==
- Paepalanthus nanus Silveira
- Paepalanthus neglectus Körn.
- Paepalanthus neopulvinatus Moldenke
- Paepalanthus niger (Moldenke) Trovó
- Paepalanthus nigrescens Silveira
- Paepalanthus nigricaulis Silveira
- Paepalanthus nigriflorus Silveira
- Paepalanthus nipensis Gonz.Géigel
- Paepalanthus nodifer Silveira

== O ==
- Paepalanthus obconicus Silveira
- Paepalanthus oblongifolius Giul. & E.B.Miranda
- Paepalanthus obnatus Tissot-Sq.
- Paepalanthus obtusifolius (Steud.) Körn.
- Paepalanthus ochrocephalus Körn.
- Paepalanthus ocreatus Silveira
- Paepalanthus oerstedianus Körn.
- Paepalanthus oligocephalus Körn.
- Paepalanthus oreodoxus Andrino & Gonella
- Paepalanthus orthoblepharus Silveira
- Paepalanthus orthogonalis Silveira
- Paepalanthus ovatus Körn.
- Paepalanthus oxyphyllus Körn.
- Paepalanthus oyapockensis Herzog

== P ==
- Paepalanthus pachyphyllus Körn.
- Paepalanthus paganuccii Giul. & M.J.G.Andrade
- Paepalanthus pallidus Silveira
- Paepalanthus parallelinervius Silveira
- Paepalanthus paramensis Moldenke
- Paepalanthus parvicephalus (Moldenke) Hensold
- Paepalanthus parviflorus (Hensold) Hensold
- Paepalanthus parvifolius Silveira
- Paepalanthus parvus Ruhland
- Paepalanthus paulensis Ruhland
- Paepalanthus paulinus Ruhland
- Paepalanthus perbracchiatus Silveira
- Paepalanthus perpusillus Kunth
- Paepalanthus petraeus Körn.
- Paepalanthus phaeocephalus Ruhland
- Paepalanthus pilosus (Kunth) Kunth
- Paepalanthus piresii Moldenke
- Paepalanthus piscatorum Hensold
- Paepalanthus plagiostigma Silveira
- Paepalanthus planifolius (Bong.) Körn.
- Paepalanthus plantagineus (Bong.) Körn.
- Paepalanthus plantaginoides (Desv.) Körn.
- Paepalanthus platycaulis Silveira
- Paepalanthus plumosus (Bong.) Körn.
- Paepalanthus politus Trovó
- Paepalanthus polyanthus (Bong.) Kunth
- Paepalanthus polycladus Silveira
- Paepalanthus polygonus Körn.
- Paepalanthus polytrichoides Kunth
- Paepalanthus praedensatus Silveira
- Paepalanthus praemorsus Ruhland
- Paepalanthus prostratus Körn.
- Paepalanthus pruinosus Ruhland
- Paepalanthus pseudoelongatus Ruhland
- Paepalanthus pseudotortilis Ruhland
- Paepalanthus pubescens Körn.
- Paepalanthus pulchellus Herzog
- Paepalanthus pullus Körn.
- Paepalanthus pulvinatus N.E.Br.
- Paepalanthus pungens Griseb.
- Paepalanthus pyatan Picanço & Trovó

== R ==
- Paepalanthus ramosus (Wikstr.) Kunth
- Paepalanthus rectifolius Trovó, Echtern. & Sano
- Paepalanthus reflexus Silveira
- Paepalanthus refractifolius Silveira
- Paepalanthus regalis Mart. ex Körn.
- Paepalanthus regelianus Körn.
- Paepalanthus repens (Lam.) Körn.
- Paepalanthus retusus C.Wright
- Paepalanthus revolutus Hensold
- Paepalanthus rhizocephalus Silveira
- Paepalanthus rhizomatosus Silveira
- Paepalanthus riedelianus (Bong.) Körn.
- Paepalanthus rigidifolius Silveira
- Paepalanthus rigidulus Mart.
- Paepalanthus rigidus (Bong.) Kunth
- Paepalanthus riparius Moldenke
- Paepalanthus robustus Silveira
- Paepalanthus rollimiae L.E.F.Silva
- Paepalanthus roqueae Giul., Sano & R.B.Almeida
- Paepalanthus rufescens Silveira
- Paepalanthus rufoalbus Silveira
- Paepalanthus rupestris Gardner

== S ==
- Paepalanthus salimenae M.Cabrini & Trovó
- Paepalanthus saxatilis (Bong.) Körn.
- Paepalanthus scandens Ruhland
- Paepalanthus schlimii Körn.
- Paepalanthus schneckii Poulsen
- Paepalanthus schuechianus Körn.
- Paepalanthus scirpeus Mart. ex Körn.
- Paepalanthus scleranthus Ruhland
- Paepalanthus scytophyllus Ruhland
- Paepalanthus sedoides Körn.
- Paepalanthus senaeanus Ruhland
- Paepalanthus sericeus Silveira
- Paepalanthus sericiscapus Trovó
- Paepalanthus serpens Echtern. & Trovó
- Paepalanthus serrinhensis Silveira
- Paepalanthus seslerioides Griseb.
- Paepalanthus sessiliflorus Mart. ex Körn.
- Paepalanthus sicifolius Silveira
- Paepalanthus silveirae Ruhland
- Paepalanthus singularius Moldenke
- Paepalanthus sinuosus Echtern. & Trovó
- Paepalanthus spathulatus Körn.
- Paepalanthus speleicola (Silveira) M.J.G.Andrade & Giul.
- Paepalanthus sphaerocephalus Ruhland
- Paepalanthus sphaerulifer Silveira
- Paepalanthus spirophorus Silveira
- Paepalanthus spixianus Mart.
- Paepalanthus stannardii Giul. & L.R.Parra
- Paepalanthus stellatus Trovó
- Paepalanthus stenolepis Silveira
- Paepalanthus stephanophorus Silveira
- Paepalanthus stereophyllus Ruhland
- Paepalanthus striatus Ruhland
- Paepalanthus strictus Körn.
- Paepalanthus stuetzelii Hensold
- Paepalanthus subfalcatus Ruhland
- Paepalanthus subtilis Miq.
- Paepalanthus succisus Mart. ex Körn.
- Paepalanthus suffruticans Ruhland
- Paepalanthus superbus Ruhland
- Paepalanthus supinus Körn.

== T ==
- Paepalanthus tenuicaulis Silveira
- Paepalanthus tessmannii Moldenke
- Paepalanthus thomasianus Tissot-Sq. & Sauthier
- Paepalanthus tortilis (Bong.) Mart. ex Körn.
- Paepalanthus triangularis (L.) Körn.
- Paepalanthus tricholepis Silveira
- Paepalanthus trichopeplus Silveira
- Paepalanthus trichopetalus Körn.
- Paepalanthus trichophyllus (Bong.) Körn.
- Paepalanthus tuberosus (Bong.) Kunth

== U ==
- Paepalanthus uai Andrino, F.N.Costa & Sano
- Paepalanthus uleanus Ruhland
- Paepalanthus umbrosus Giul. & E.B.Miranda
- Paepalanthus uncinatus Gardner
- Paepalanthus undulatus Ruhland
- Paepalanthus urbanianus Ruhland
- Paepalanthus usterii Beauverd

== V ==
- Paepalanthus vaginans Silveira
- Paepalanthus vaginatus Körn.
- Paepalanthus vellozioides Körn.
- Paepalanthus velutinus Silveira
- Paepalanthus velutiphyllus F.N.Costa, Andrino & Sano
- Paepalanthus verae (Sano & Trovó) Christenh. & Byng
- Paepalanthus versatilis Sauthier & Tissot-Sq.
- Paepalanthus vestitus Ruhland
- Paepalanthus villipes Moldenke
- Paepalanthus villosulus Mart. ex Körn.
- Paepalanthus viridis Körn.
- Paepalanthus viridulus Ruhland

== W, X, Y, Z ==
- Paepalanthus warmingianus Körn. ex Poulsen
- Paepalanthus weberbaueri Ruhland
- Paepalanthus weddellianus Körn.
- Paepalanthus xanthopus Silveira
- Paepalanthus xiphophyllus Ruhland
- Paepalanthus yapacanensis (Moldenke) Hensold
