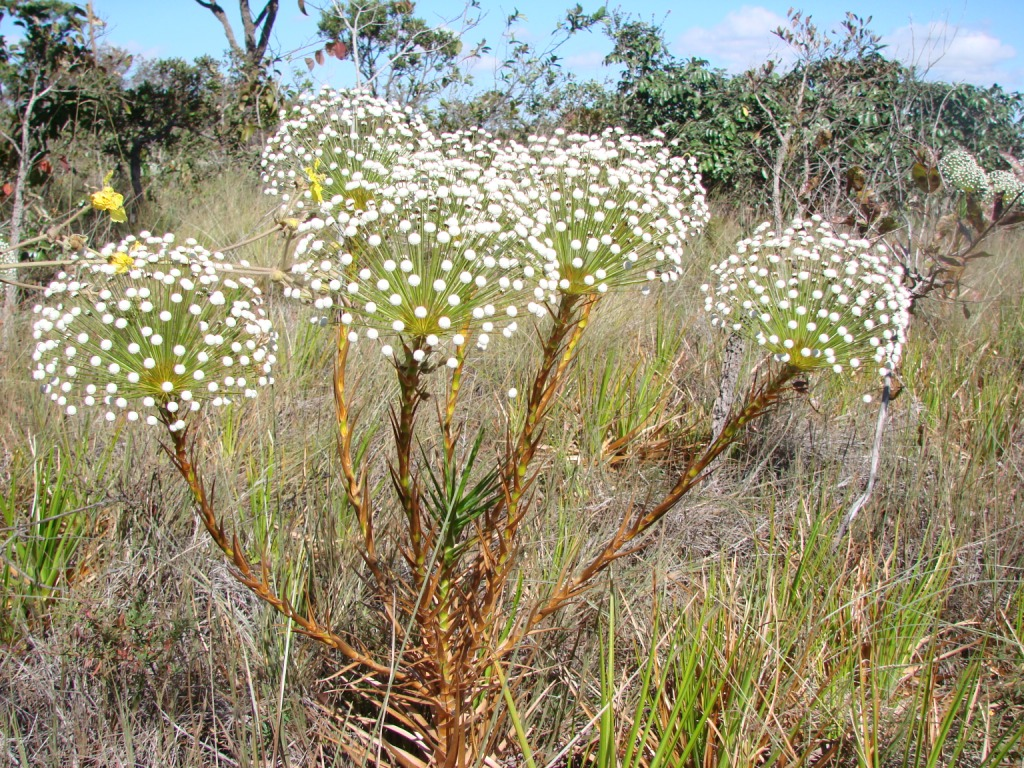
- A. bongardii

Scientific classification
- Kingdom: Plantae
- Clade: Tracheophytes
- Clade: Angiosperms
- Clade: Monocots
- Clade: Commelinids
- Order: Poales
- Family: Eriocaulaceae
- Genus: Actinocephalus (Körn.) Sano

Synonyms
- Paepalanthus subgen. Actinocephalus Körn.

= Actinocephalus =

Genus of flowering plants

Actinocephalus is a genus of plants in the Eriocaulaceae, first described in 2004. The entire genus is endemic to Brazil. It was formerly regarded as part of the related genus Paepalanthus, but recent studies have suggested that the two groups are better separated.

== Species ==
- Actinocephalus aggregatus F.N.Costa - Minas Gerais
- Actinocephalus bongardii (A.St.-Hil.) Sano - eastern + southern Brazil
- Actinocephalus brachypus (Bong.) Sano - Minas Gerais
- Actinocephalus cabralensis (Silveira) Sano - Minas Gerais
- Actinocephalus callophyllus (Silveira) Sano - Minas Gerais
- Actinocephalus ciliatus (Bong.) Sano - Minas Gerais, Rio de Janeiro
- Actinocephalus cipoensis (Silveira) Sano - Minas Gerais
- Actinocephalus claussenianus (Körn.) Sano - eastern + southern Brazil
- Actinocephalus compactus (Gardner) Sano - Minas Gerais
- Actinocephalus coutoensis (Moldenke) Sano - Minas Gerais
- Actinocephalus deflexus F.N.Costa - Minas Gerais
- Actinocephalus delicatus Sano - Minas Gerais
- Actinocephalus denudatus (Körn.) Sano - Minas Gerais
- Actinocephalus diffusus (Silveira) Sano - Minas Gerais
- Actinocephalus divaricatus (Bong.) Sano - Minas Gerais
- Actinocephalus falcifolius (Körn.) Sano - Minas Gerais, Bahia
- Actinocephalus fimbriatus (Silveira) Sano - Minas Gerais
- Actinocephalus giuliettiae Sano - Minas Gerais
- Actinocephalus glabrescens (Silveira) Sano - Minas Gerais
- Actinocephalus graminifolius F.N.Costa - Minas Gerais
- Actinocephalus herzogii (Moldenke) Sano - Bahia
- Actinocephalus heterotrichus (Silveira) Sano - Minas Gerais
- Actinocephalus ithyphyllus (Mart.) Sano - Minas Gerais
- Actinocephalus koernickeanus Trovó & F.N.Costa - Minas Gerais
- Actinocephalus nodifer (Silveira) Sano - Minas Gerais
- Actinocephalus ochrocephalus (Körn.) Sano - Bahia
- Actinocephalus pachyphyllus (Körn.) F.N.Costa, Trovó & Echtern. - Minas Gerais
- Actinocephalus polyanthus (Bong.) Sano - eastern + southern Brazil
- Actinocephalus ramosus (Wikstr.) Sano - eastern Brazil
- Actinocephalus rigidus (Bong.) Sano - Minas Gerais
- Actinocephalus robustus (Silveira) Sano - Minas Gerais
- Actinocephalus stereophyllus (Ruhland) Sano - Minas Gerais
- Actinocephalus verae Sano & Trovó - Minas Gerais
