= Leiothrix =

Leiothrix may refer to:

- Leiothrix (bird), a genus in the Old World babbler family
- Leiothrix (plant), a genus in the family Eriocaulaceae
