= Syngonanthus peruvianus =

Conservation status
- Least Concern (IUCN 3.1)

Scientific classification
- Kingdom: Plantae
- Clade: Embryophytes
- Clade: Tracheophytes
- Clade: Spermatophytes
- Clade: Angiosperms
- Clade: Monocots
- Clade: Commelinids
- Order: Poales
- Family: Eriocaulaceae
- Genus: Syngonanthus
- Species: S. peruvianus

Binomial name
- Syngonanthus peruvianus Ruhland

Synonyms
- Paepalanthus peruvianus (Ruhland) J.F.Macbr.; Syngonanthus yacuambensis Moldenke

Species of flowering plant

Syngonanthus peruvianus is a species of flowering plant in the Eriocaulaceae family. It is a perennial or subshrub native to Peru. Its natural habitat is in wetlands.
