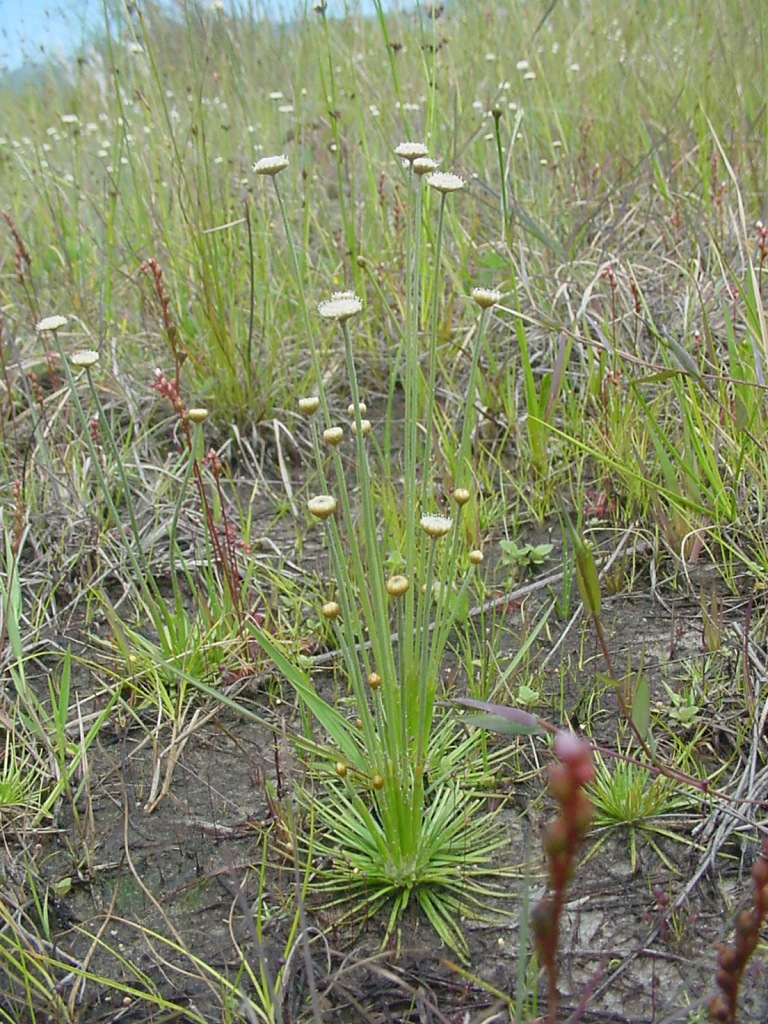
- Syngonanthus chrysanthus

Scientific classification
- Kingdom: Plantae
- Clade: Tracheophytes
- Clade: Angiosperms
- Clade: Monocots
- Clade: Commelinids
- Order: Poales
- Family: Eriocaulaceae
- Genus: Syngonanthus; Ruhland

Synonyms
- Carptotepala Moldenke; Limnoxeranthemum Salzm. ex Steud.; Philodice Mart.

= Syngonanthus =

Genus of plants

Syngonanthus is a genus of flowering plants in the family Eriocaulaceae. It is native to tropical Africa and to Latin America (from Mexico and Cuba south to Argentina).

== Species ==
146 species are accepted.

- Syngonanthus acephalus Hensold – Amazonas State in Venezuela
- Syngonanthus albopulvinatus (Moldenke) Moldenke – Venezuela
- Syngonanthus allenii Moldenke – Colombia, Amazonas State in Brazil
- Syngonanthus amapensis Moldenke – Colombia, Venezuela, northwestern Brazil
- Syngonanthus amazonicus Moldenke – Colombia, Venezuela, northwestern Brazil
- Syngonanthus androsaceus (Griseb.) Ruhland – Cuba
- Syngonanthus angolensis H.E.Hess – Angola, Zaïre, Zambia, Tanzania, Malawi
- Syngonanthus anomalus (Körn.) Ruhland – Colombia, Venezuela, northern Brazil, Ecuador, the Guianas
- Syngonanthus anthemidiflorus (Bong.) Ruhland – Brazil, Misiones Province of Argentina
- Syngonanthus appressus (Körn.) Ruhland – central and southern Brazil
- Syngonanthus aquaticus Silveira – Minas Gerais
- Syngonanthus arenarius (Gardner) Ruhland – Minas Gerais
- Syngonanthus atrovirens (Körn.) Ruhland – Minas Gerais
- Syngonanthus auripes Silveira – Bahia, Goiás
- Syngonanthus bartlettii Moldenke – Belize
- Syngonanthus bellus Moldenke – Venezuela, northern Brazil
- Syngonanthus bianoensis Kimp. – Zaïre
- Syngonanthus bicolor Silveira – Minas Gerais
- Syngonanthus biformis (N.E.Br.) Gleason – Colombia, Venezuela, northern Brazil, Peru, the Guianas
- Syngonanthus bisumbellatus (Steud.) Ruhland – Colombia, Venezuela, Guyana, Pará, Piauí
- Syngonanthus blackii Moldenke – Pará
- Syngonanthus bracteosus Moldenke – Minas Gerais
- Syngonanthus cabralensis Silveira – Minas Gerais
- Syngonanthus cachimboensis Moldenke – Pará
- Syngonanthus canaliculatus Silveira – Minas Gerais
- Syngonanthus capillaceus Silveira – Minas Gerais
- Syngonanthus caulescens (Poir.) Ruhland – State of Veracruz in Mexico; Costa Rica, Venezuela, Colombia, the Guianas, Peru, Brazil, Bolivia, Argentina, Paraguay, Uruguay
- Syngonanthus chapadensis Silveira – Minas Gerais
- Syngonanthus chrysanthus (Bong.) Ruhland – southeastern Brazil
- Syngonanthus costatus Ruhland – Minas Gerais
- Syngonanthus cowanii Moldenke – southeastern Colombia, Amazonas State in Venezuela
- Syngonanthus crassinervius Silveira – Minas Gerais
- Syngonanthus culcitosus Echtern. – west-central Minas Gerais
- Syngonanthus cuyabensis (Bong.) Giul., Hensold & L.R.Parra – Brazil, Bolivia, Venezuela, Colombia, Guyana, Suriname
- Syngonanthus davidsei Huft – Chiapas
- Syngonanthus decorus Moldenke – Goiás
- Syngonanthus densiflorus (Körn.) Ruhland – Peru, Brazil, Bolivia
- Syngonanthus densifolius Silveira – Goiás and Minas Gerais
- Syngonanthus densus (Körn.) Ruhland – Brazil
- Syngonanthus diamantinensis Silveira – Minas Gerais
- Syngonanthus dichroanthus Hensold – Goiás
- Syngonanthus discretifolius (Moldenke) M.T.C.Watan. –
- Syngonanthus duidae Moldenke – Venezuela
- Syngonanthus egleri Moldenke – Pará
- Syngonanthus exilis S.M.Phillips – Zambia
- Syngonanthus fenestratus Hensold – Venezuela, northern Brazil, Guyana
- Syngonanthus ferrensis Silveira – Minas Gerais
- Syngonanthus filipes Silveira – Minas Gerais
- Syngonanthus fischerianus (Bong.) Ruhland – Brazil, Bolivia
- Syngonanthus flaviceps Silveira – Minas Gerais
- Syngonanthus flavidulus (Michx.) Ruhland – southeastern USA (Alabama, Florida, Georgia, North and South Carolina)
- Syngonanthus fuscescens Ruhland – Minas Gerais
- Syngonanthus garimpensis Silveira – Minas Gerais
- Syngonanthus glandulifer Silveira – Minas Gerais
- Syngonanthus goyazensis (Körn.) Ruhland – Goiás, Minas Gerais
- Syngonanthus gracilis (Bong.) Ruhland – Colombia, Venezuela, northern Brazil, Peru, the Guianas, Bolivia, Paraguay, Uruguay
- Syngonanthus grao-mogolensis Silveira – Minas Gerais
- Syngonanthus helminthorrhizus (Mart. ex Körn.) Ruhland – Brazil, Paraguay
- Syngonanthus hensoldiae M.T.C.Watan. & Sano – Goiás
- Syngonanthus heteropeploides Herzog – Venezuela, northern Brazil, Guyana
- Syngonanthus heterotrichus Silveira – Minas Gerais
- Syngonanthus hirtellus Ruhland – Minas Gerais
- Syngonanthus hondurensis Moldenke – Belize
- Syngonanthus humbertii Moldenke – Madagascar
- Syngonanthus humboldtii (Kunth) Ruhland – Colombia, Venezuela, northern Brazil, the Guianas
- Syngonanthus hygrotrichus Ruhland – Minas Gerais
- Syngonanthus incurvifolius M.T.C.Watan. & Echtern. – Goiás
- Syngonanthus insularis Moldenke – Isla de la Juventud in Cuba
- Syngonanthus itambeensis Silveira – Minas Gerais
- Syngonanthus lagopodioides (Griseb.) Ruhland – Cuba
- Syngonanthus lanatus Moldenke – Brazil
- Syngonanthus lanceolatus Silveira – Minas Gerais
- Syngonanthus laricifolius (Gardner) Ruhland – Brazil
- Syngonanthus latifolius (Moldenke) Hensold – Mato Grosso
- Syngonanthus leprieurii (Körn.) Ruhland – Pará, French Guiana, Venezuela
- Syngonanthus lisowskii Kimp – Zaïre
- Syngonanthus llanorum Ruhland – Colombia; Apure State in Venezuela
- Syngonanthus longibracteatus Kimp – Zaïre, Tanzania, Zambia, Zimbabwe, Mozambique
- Syngonanthus longipes Gleason – Brazil, Venezuela, Colombia, Guyana, Suriname
- Syngonanthus lundellianus Moldenke – Belize
- Syngonanthus macrocephalus (Moldenke) Hensold – Cerro Sipapo in Venezuela
- Syngonanthus macrolepis Silveira – Minas Gerais
- Syngonanthus manikaensis Kimp – Zaïre
- Syngonanthus marginatus Silveira – Minas Gerais
- Syngonanthus micropus Silveira – São Paulo
- Syngonanthus minutifolius Silveira – Minas Gerais
- Syngonanthus minutulus (Steud.) Moldenke – Pará, Minas Gerais
- Syngonanthus minutus (Moldenke) Hensold – Auyán-tepui in Venezuela
- Syngonanthus mollis M.T.C.Watan. – Bolivia and Peru
- Syngonanthus multipes Silveira – Minas Gerais
- Syngonanthus mwinilungensis S.M.Phillips – Zambia
- Syngonanthus nanus Moldenke – Paraná
- Syngonanthus ngoweensis Lecomte – Zaïre, Congo-Brazzaville, Angola
- Syngonanthus niger Silveira – Minas Gerais
- Syngonanthus nigroalbus Silveira – Minas Gerais
- Syngonanthus nitens (Bong.) Ruhland – Brazil, Paraguay, Bolivia, Peru, Colombia, Venezuela
- Syngonanthus oblongus (Körn.) Ruhland – Brazil, Colombia, Venezuela
- Syngonanthus oneillii Moldenke – Belize
- Syngonanthus ottohuberi Hensold – Amazonas State in Venezuela
- Syngonanthus pakaraimensis Moldenke – Venezuela, Guyana
- Syngonanthus paleaceus S.M.Phillips – Zambia
- Syngonanthus pallens Silveira – Minas Gerais
- Syngonanthus pauciflorus Silveira – Minas Gerais
- Syngonanthus peruvianus Ruhland (synonym Syngonanthus yacuambensis Moldenke) – Ecuador and northeastern and central Peru
- Syngonanthus philcoxii Moldenke – Mato Grosso
- Syngonanthus philodicoides (Körn.) Ruhland – Bahia, Goiás
- Syngonanthus pittieri Moldenke – Panama
- Syngonanthus planus Ruhland – Bahia, Minas Gerais
- Syngonanthus plumosus Silveira – Minas Gerais
- Syngonanthus poggeanus Ruhland – Burundi, Zaïre, Congo-Brazzaville, Angola, Zambia
- Syngonanthus polyaxis Echtern. & M.T.C.Watan. – Minas Gerais
- Syngonanthus pulchellus Moldenke – Minas Gerais
- Syngonanthus pulcher (Körn.) Ruhland – Goiás, Minas Gerais
- Syngonanthus pulvinellus Moldenke – Minas Gerais
- Syngonanthus quadrangularis Silveira – Minas Gerais
- Syngonanthus reclinatus (Körn.) Ruhland – Brazil
- Syngonanthus restingensis Hensold & A.L.R.Oliveira – Bahia, Rio de Janeiro
- Syngonanthus retrorsus Silveira – Minas Gerais
- Syngonanthus rhizonema Ruhland – São Paulo
- Syngonanthus robinsonii Moldenke – Zaïre, Zambia
- Syngonanthus saxicola (Körn.) Trovó & Stützel – Goiás
- Syngonanthus schlechteri Ruhland – Zaïre, Gabon, Congo-Brazzaville, Tanzania
- Syngonanthus schwackei Ruhland – eastern Brazil
- Syngonanthus sclerophyllus Ruhland – Goiás
- Syngonanthus setifolius Hensold – northern Brazil, Venezuela
- Syngonanthus sickii Moldenke – Pará
- Syngonanthus simplex (Miq.) Ruhland – Colombia, Venezuela, northern Brazil, the Guianas
- Syngonanthus sinuosus Silveira – Minas Gerais
- Syngonanthus spadiceus (Körn.) Ruhland – Piauí, Minas Gerais
- Syngonanthus spongiosus Hensold – Amazonas State of Brazil
- Syngonanthus surinamensis Moldenke – Suriname
- Syngonanthus syngonanthoides (Silveira) Trovó & Stützel – Minas Gerais
- Syngonanthus tenuipes Silveira – Minas Gerais
- Syngonanthus tenuis (Kunth) Ruhland – Colombia, Venezuela, northern Brazil
- Syngonanthus tiricensis Moldenke – Bolívar State in Venezuela
- Syngonanthus trichophyllus Moldenke – Colombia, Venezuela, northern Brazil, Guyana
- Syngonanthus umbellatus (Lam.) Ruhland – Dominican Republic, Colombia, Venezuela, northern Brazil, the Guianas
- Syngonanthus upembaensis Kimp – Zaïre
- Syngonanthus verticillatus (Bong.) Ruhland – Goiás, Minas Gerais
- Syngonanthus vittatus M.T.C.Watan. & Echtern. – Goiás
- Syngonanthus wahlbergii (Wikstr. ex Körn.) Ruhland – from Nigeria east to Tanzania, south to northern South Africa
- Syngonanthus weddellii Moldenke – Pará, Goiás
- Syngonanthus welwitschii (Rendle) Ruhland – Zaïre, Sierra Leone, Tanzania, Angola, Zambia
- Syngonanthus widgrenianus (Körn.) Ruhland – eastern Brazil
- Syngonanthus williamsii (Moldenke) Hensold – Colombia, Venezuela, northern Brazil
- Syngonanthus xinguensis Moldenke – Mato Grosso
