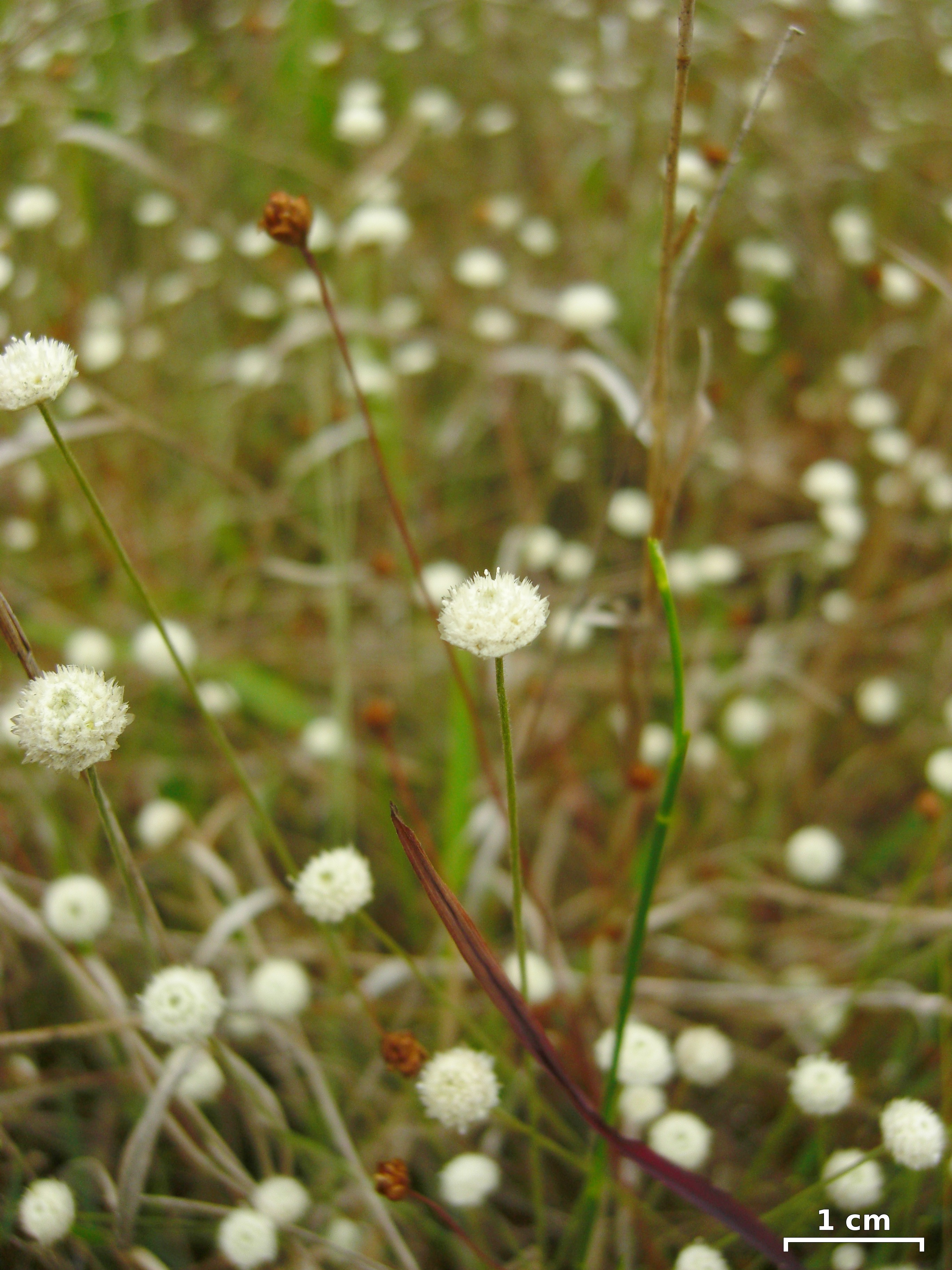

Scientific classification
- Kingdom: Plantae
- Clade: Tracheophytes
- Clade: Angiosperms
- Clade: Monocots
- Clade: Commelinids
- Order: Poales
- Family: Eriocaulaceae
- Genus: Syngonanthus
- Species: S. flavidulus

Binomial name
- Syngonanthus flavidulus (Michx.) Ruhland

= Syngonanthus flavidulus =

Species of flowering plant

Syngonanthus flavidulus, common name yellow hatpins, is a flowering plant. It grows in the southeastern United States including Alabama, Florida, Georgia, North Carolina and South Carolina. It is in the Syngonanthus genus and pipewort family Eriocaulaceae. A perennial, it grows to about a foot in height. It grows in flatwoods, prairies, and pond margins. It has very small flowers that bloom February to July and appear as small white buttons and it has shiny leaves. Eugen Otto Wilhelm Ruhland reclassified it from Eriocaulon to Syngonanthus in 1903.
