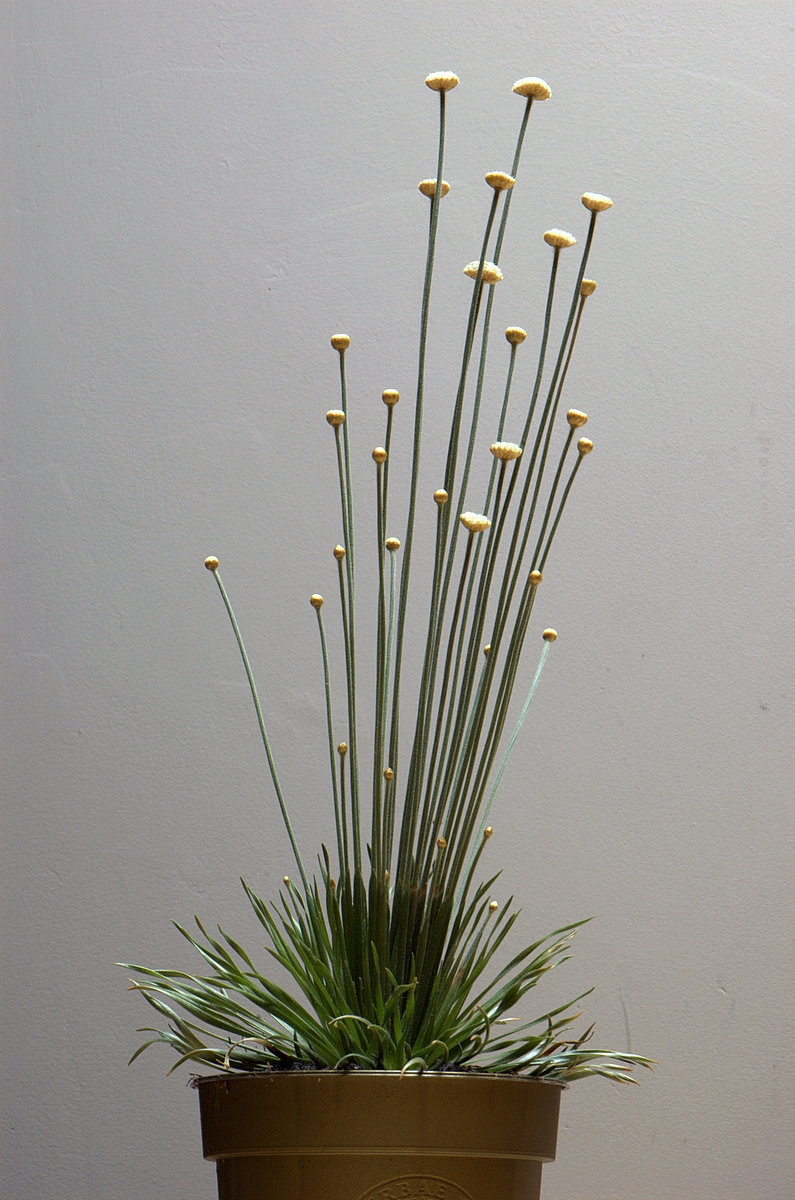
- Syngonanthus chrysanthus 'Mikado'

Scientific classification
- Kingdom: Plantae
- Clade: Tracheophytes
- Clade: Angiosperms
- Clade: Monocots
- Clade: Commelinids
- Order: Poales
- Family: Eriocaulaceae
- Genus: Syngonanthus
- Species: S. chrysanthus

Binomial name
- Syngonanthus chrysanthus (Bong.) Ruhland

= Syngonanthus chrysanthus =

Species of flowering plant

Syngonanthus chrysanthus is a species in the family Eriocaulaceae, native to southeastern Brazil. One cultivar of this species is Syngonanthus chrysanthus 'Mikado', which is also simply called 'Mikado'. It has a rosette-forming base of velvety leaves and long stems which display initially golden enclosed buds, forming creamy-white button flowers. This plant prefers an indoor setting with humid conditions and high light.

== Gallery ==
Close-up of opened button inflorescence

Close-up of unopened inflorescence
