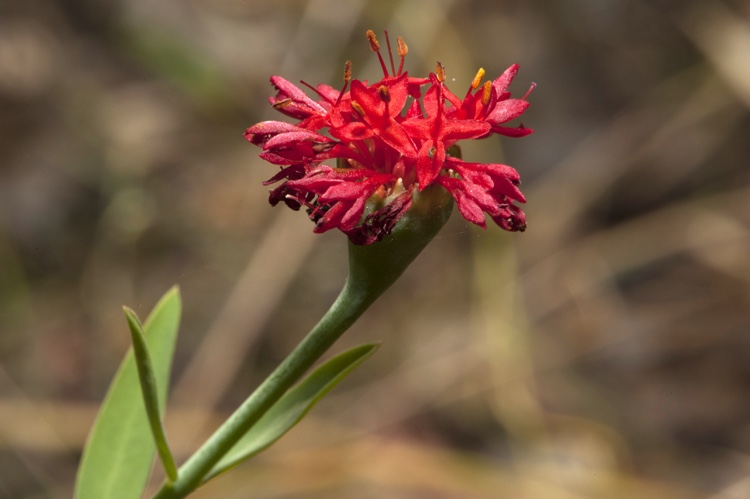
- In Kakadu National Park

Scientific classification
- Kingdom: Plantae
- Clade: Tracheophytes
- Clade: Angiosperms
- Clade: Eudicots
- Clade: Rosids
- Order: Malvales
- Family: Thymelaeaceae
- Genus: Pimelea
- Species: P. punicea

Binomial name
- Pimelea punicea R.Br.

Synonyms
- List: Banksia punicea (R.Br.) Kuntze; Calyptostregia punicea C.S.P.Foster & Henwood orth. var.; Calyptrostegia punicea (R.Br.) Endl.; Pimelea punicea var. breviloba Benth.; Pimelea punicea R.Br. var. punicea; Thecanthes punicea (R.Br.) Wikstr.

= Pimelea punicea =

Species of flowering plant

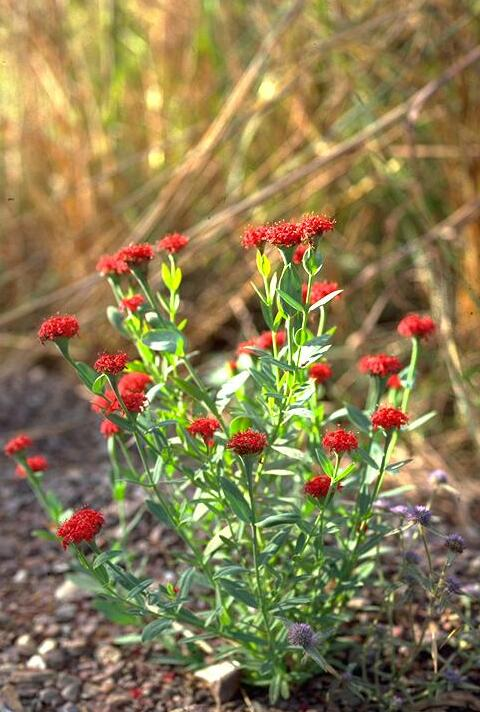
Habit

Pimelea punicea is a species of flowering plant in the family Thymelaeaceae and is endemic to northern Australia. It is an annual herb with narrowly egg-shaped to lance-shaped leaves arranged in opposite pairs, and clusters of red or orange-red flowers with 4 green, egg-shaped involucral bracts.

== Description ==
Pimelea punicea is a glabrous, somewhat glaucous annual herb that typically grows to a height of 20–60 cm (7.9–23.6 in). The leaves are arranged in opposite pairs, lance-shaped, narrowly elliptic or narrowly egg-shaped, sometimes with the narrower end towards the base, 7–52 mm (0.28–2.05 in) long and 2–11 mm (0.079–0.433 in) wide on a short petiole. The flowers are red to orange-red and arranged in heads on the ends of branches on a peduncle expanded at its top into a funnel-shaped receptacle. Each flower is on a pedicel up to 1.5 mm (0.059 in) long and there are 4 green, egg-shaped involucral bracts 2–10 mm (0.079–0.394 in) long and 3–12 mm (0.12–0.47 in) wide surrounding the flowers. The flower tube is 4–9 mm (0.16–0.35 in) long and the sepals 1.5–5 mm (0.059–0.197 in) long. Flowering mainly occurs from February to July.

== Taxonomy ==
Pimelea punicea was first formally described in 1810 by Robert Brown in his Prodromus Florae Novae Hollandiae et Insulae Van Diemen. The specific epithet (punica) means "crimson".

== Distribution and habitat ==
This pimelea mainly grows in open forest, usually in sandy soil and often in rocky ground. It is found from near the Fitzroy River in Western Australia to the western edge of the Gulf of Carpentaria in the north of the Northern Territory.

== Conservation status ==
Pimelea punicea is listed as "not threatened" by the Western Australian Government Department of Biodiversity, Conservation and Attractions and as of "least concern" under the Territory Parks and wildlife Conservation Act.
