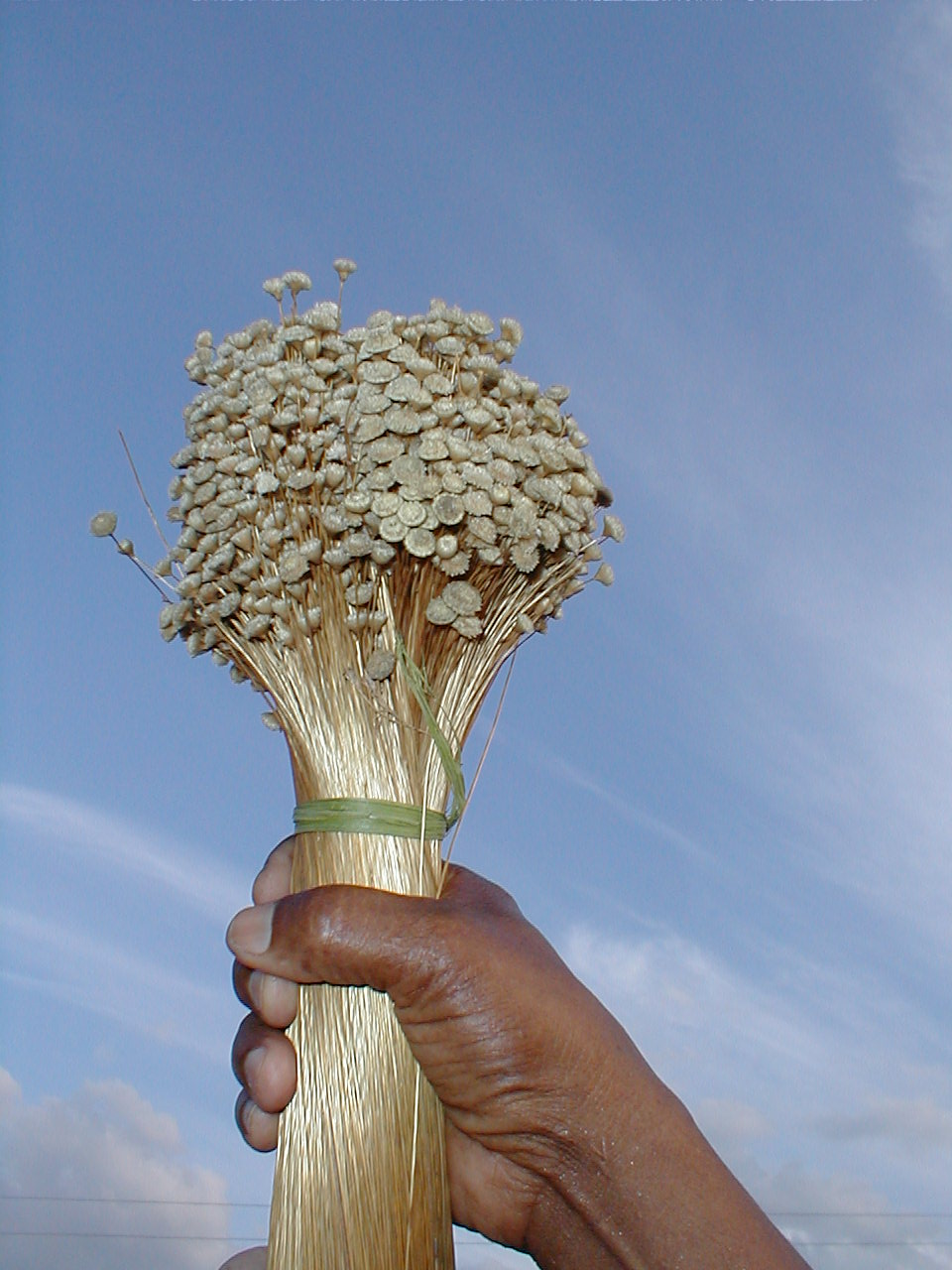
- Golden grass

Scientific classification
- Kingdom: Plantae
- Clade: Tracheophytes
- Clade: Angiosperms
- Clade: Monocots
- Clade: Commelinids
- Order: Poales
- Family: Eriocaulaceae
- Genus: Syngonanthus
- Species: S. nitens

Binomial name
- Syngonanthus nitens (Bong.) Ruhland

= Syngonanthus nitens =

Species of grass-like plant

Syngonanthus nitens is a grass-like species of Eriocaulaceae which exists in the region of Jalapão, state of Tocantins, Brazil - the region is part of the Brazilian cerrado. Its main characteristic is the bright and gold color, hence their common name "capim dourado", which literally means "golden grass".

The making of handicrafts from S. nitens began in Jalapão, in the Afro-Brazilian community of Mumbuca in the municipality of Mateiros. Indigenous people, probably from the Xerente ethnic group, taught the art to local inhabitants when passing through the region around the 1930s. The handicrafts are made of coils of S. nitens scapes sewn tightly together with strips from the Moriche Palm's (Mauritia flexuosa) young leaves. For decades the handicrafts were only made by women for household uses and/or sporadic selling. Today, there are at least 12 local community associations. The handicrafts are usually sold in small shops of local artisan associations.

Syngonanthus nitens' flowering starts in July and seeds are produced from the beginning of September through October. The Tocantins State Government, through its Environmental Agency (Naturatins), established a regional law (Portaria 55/2004 and 092/2005) allowing scape harvesting only after September 20, and requiring flowerhead cutting and dispersal in the grassland areas just after scape harvesting. This regional law can be an efficient tool for contributing to the sustainability of S. nitens handicraft activities.
