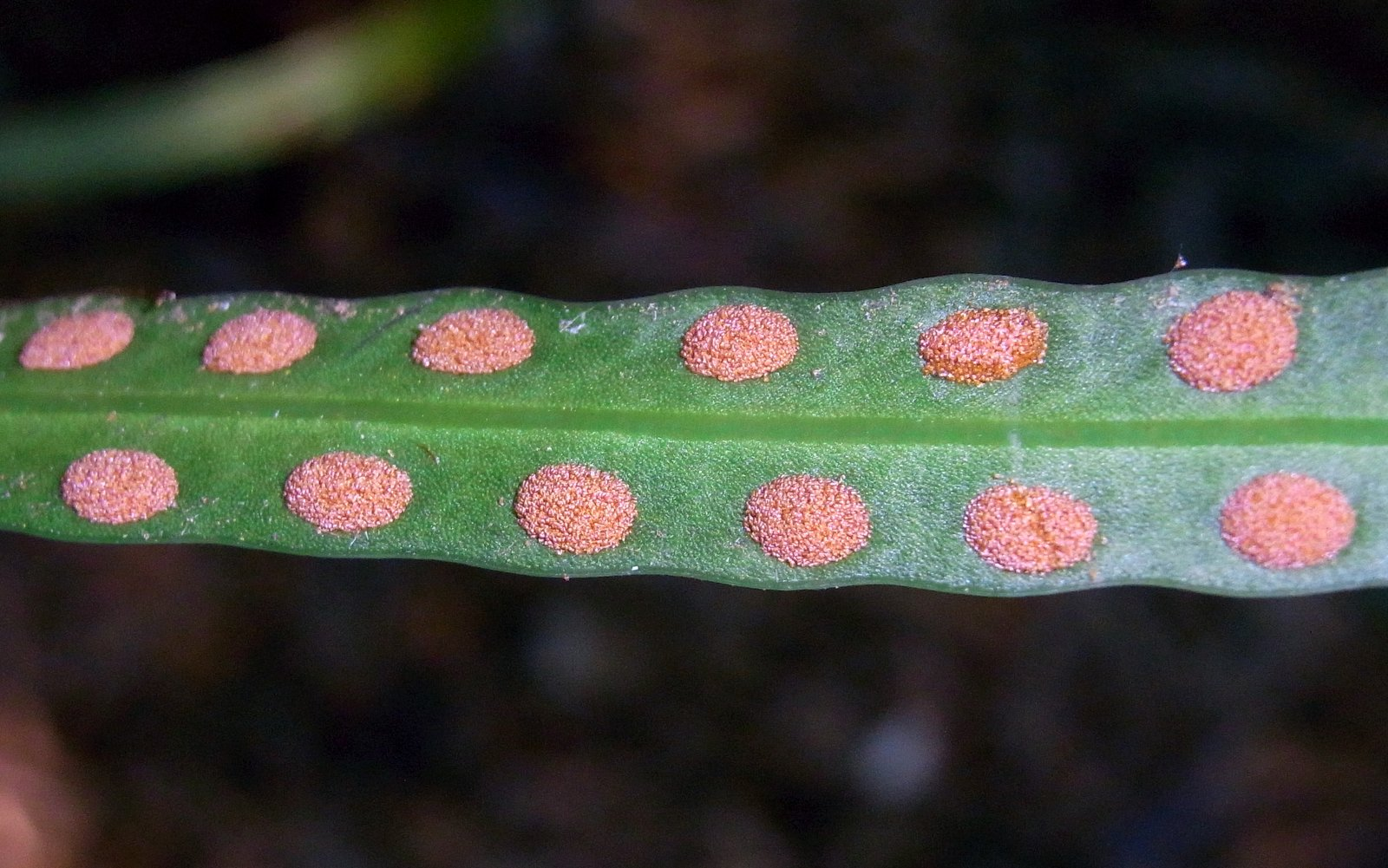

Scientific classification
- Kingdom: Plantae
- Clade: Tracheophytes
- Division: Polypodiophyta
- Class: Polypodiopsida
- Order: Polypodiales
- Suborder: Polypodiineae
- Family: Polypodiaceae
- Genus: Dictymia
- Species: D. brownii

Binomial name
- Dictymia brownii (Wikstr.) Copel.

= Dictymia brownii =

Species of fern

Dictymia brownii, known as the strap fern, is a species of fern found in and near rainforest in eastern Australia. It is usually seen hanging from branches, or growing on rocks. There is a surprising record of this plant in the northern Sydney suburb of Berowra. This species was named in honour of the Scottish botanist, Robert Brown.
