= Bogbutton =

Bogbutton is a common name for several plants and may refer to:

- Eriocaulon
- Lachnocaulon
- Sclerolepis
