= Rondonanthus =

Scientific classification
- Kingdom: Plantae
- Clade: Tracheophytes
- Clade: Angiosperms
- Clade: Monocots
- Clade: Commelinids
- Order: Poales
- Family: Eriocaulaceae
- Genus: Rondonanthus; Herzog

Synonyms
- Wurdackia Moldenke

Genus of flowering plants

Rondonanthus is a genus of flowering plants in the family Eriocaulaceae. It is endemic to northern South America.

Most species are native to the tepuis, flat-topped mountains in the Brazil-Guyana-Venezuela border region.

== Species ==
Six species are accepted by Plants of the World Online as of October 2026.

- Rondonanthus acopanensis (Moldenke) Hensold & Giul. – Bolívar State of Venezuela
- Rondonanthus capillaceus (Klotzsch ex Körn.) Hensold & Giul. – Bolívar and Amazonas States of Venezuela; Guyana, northern and southeastern Brazil
- Rondonanthus caulescens (Moldenke) Hensold & Giul. – Aprada-tepui of Venezuela
- Rondonanthus duidae (Gleason) Hensold & Giul. – Bolívar and Amazonas States of Venezuela; northern Brazil
- Rondonanthus flabelliformis (Moldenke) Hensold & Giul. – Toronó-tepui of Venezuela
- Rondonanthus roraimae (Oliv.) Herzog – Mount Roraima along Venezuela/Guyana border
