= Paepalanthus bromelioides =

- Paepalanthus, family Eriocaulaceae. Native to cerrado, Brazil. Popular: "Chuveirinho"

Scientific classification
- Kingdom: Plantae
- Clade: Tracheophytes
- Clade: Angiosperms
- Clade: Monocots
- Clade: Commelinids
- Order: Poales
- Family: Eriocaulaceae
- Genus: Paepalanthus
- Species: P. bromelioides

Binomial name
- Paepalanthus bromelioides Silveira

Species of carnivorous plant

Paepalanthus bromelioides is a species in the flowering plant family Eriocaulaceae. It is a perennial native to Minas Gerais state in southeastern Brazil.

Family Eriocaulaceae is placed in the Poales, close to the Bromeliaceae, whose morphology this genus shares. Paepalanthus bromelioides is native to Cerrado. There is some speculation that the occasional insects trapped in the urn of this plant are evidence of its being a carnivorous plant or protocarnivorous, possible deriving nutrients from termite mounds that termites frequently make in the plants' roots.
