= Paepalanthus celsus =

Conservation status
- Least Concern (IUCN 3.1)

Scientific classification
- Kingdom: Plantae
- Clade: Embryophytes
- Clade: Tracheophytes
- Clade: Spermatophytes
- Clade: Angiosperms
- Clade: Monocots
- Clade: Commelinids
- Order: Poales
- Family: Eriocaulaceae
- Genus: Paepalanthus
- Species: P. celsus

Binomial name
- Paepalanthus celsus Tissot-Squalli

Species of flowering plant

Paepalanthus celsus is a species of plant in the Eriocaulaceae family. It is endemic to Ecuador. Its natural habitats are subtropical or tropical moist montane forests and subtropical or tropical high-elevation shrubland.
