= Delia Abbiatti =

Argentinian botanist

- Born: 1918; Argentina
- Known for: Studying Eriocaulaceae, Loranthaceae, Thelypteris, and Cyclosorus
- Scientific career
- Fields: Botany, pteridology
- Author abbrev. (botany): Abbiatti

Delia Abbiatti (born 1918) is an Argentinian botanist and pteridologist, noted for studying Eriocaulaceae, Loranthaceae, Thelypteris, and Cyclosorus. The species Perezia abbiattii and Thelypteris abbiattii were named in her honor. The standard author abbreviation Abbiatti is used to indicate this person as the author when citing a botanical name.
