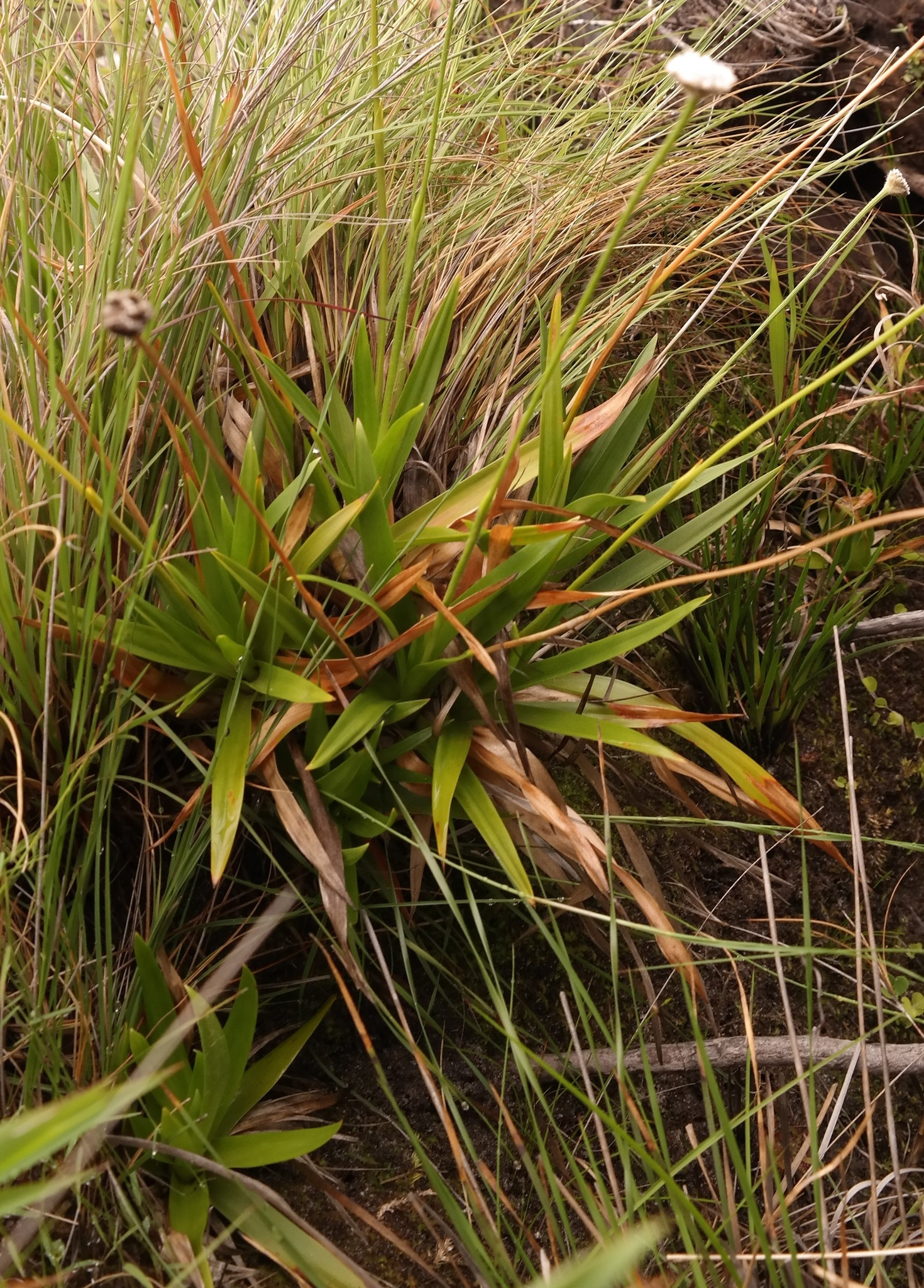
- M. africanum

Scientific classification
- Kingdom: Plantae
- Clade: Tracheophytes
- Clade: Angiosperms
- Clade: Monocots
- Clade: Commelinids
- Order: Poales
- Family: Eriocaulaceae
- Genus: Mesanthemum; Körn.

= Mesanthemum =

Genus of flowering plants

Mesanthemum is a genus of flowering plants in the family Eriocaulaceae, first described in 1856. It is native to tropical Africa and Madagascar.

== Species ==
16 species are accepted.

- Mesanthemum africanum Moldenke – Mozambique, Zimbabwe
- Mesanthemum albidum Lecomte – Guinea, Senegal, Sierra Leone
- Mesanthemum alenicola S.M.Phillips – Equatorial Guinea
- Mesanthemum angustitepalum Kimp – Zaïre
- Mesanthemum auratum Lecomte – Guinea, Senegal, Sierra Leone, Guinea-Bissau
- Mesanthemum bennae Jacq.-Fél – Guinea
- Mesanthemum cupricola Kimp – Zaïre
- Mesanthemum glabrum Kimp – Zaïre, Angola, Zambia
- Mesanthemum jaegeri Jacq.-Fél – Ivory Coast, Sierra Leone, Nigeria, Cameroon, Congo-Brazzaville
- Mesanthemum pilosum Kimp – Zaïre, Angola, Zambia, Malawi
- Mesanthemum prescottianum (Bong.) Körn. – Guinea, Ivory Coast, Liberia, Sierra Leone, Gabon
- Mesanthemum pubescens (Lam.) Körn. – Madagascar
- Mesanthemum radicans (Benth.) Körn. – widespread from Liberia east to Tanzania, south to Mozambique
- Mesanthemum reductum H.E.Hess – Congo-Brazzaville, Angola
- Mesanthemum tuberosum Lecomte - Guinea
- Mesanthemum variabile Kimp – Zaïre, Zambia
