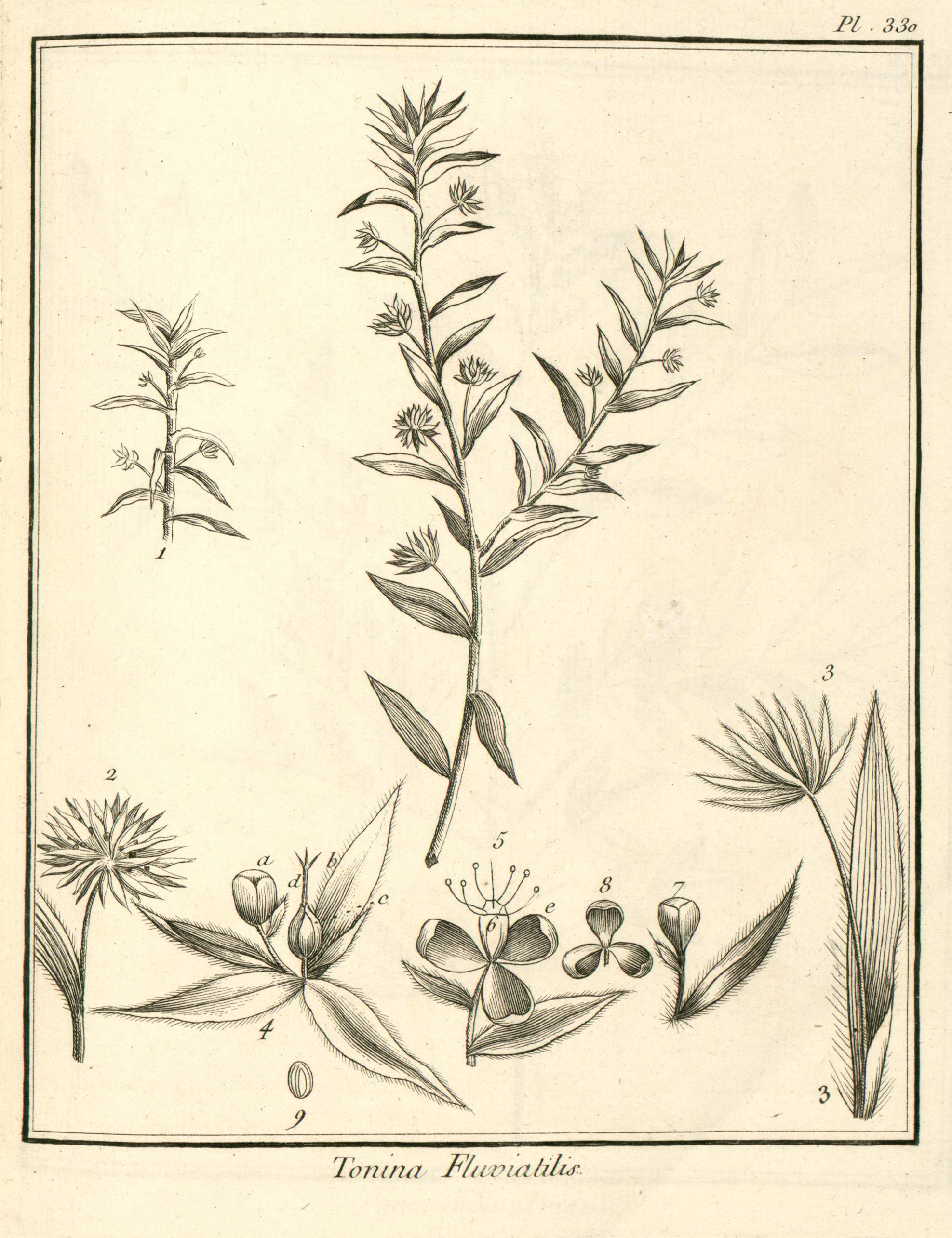

Conservation status
- Least Concern (IUCN 3.1)

Scientific classification
- Kingdom: Plantae
- Clade: Embryophytes
- Clade: Tracheophytes
- Clade: Spermatophytes
- Clade: Angiosperms
- Clade: Monocots
- Clade: Commelinids
- Order: Poales
- Family: Eriocaulaceae
- Genus: Paepalanthus
- Species: P. fluviatilis

Binomial name
- Paepalanthus fluviatilis (Aubl.) Christenh. & Byng

Synonyms
- Eriocaulon amplexicaule Rottb; Eriocaulon sphagnoides Poepp. ex Körn.; Hyphydra amplexicaulis (Rottb.) Vahl; Hyphydra fluviatilis (Aubl.) Schreb. ex Forsyth f.; Eriocaulon sphagnoides Poepp. ex Körn.; Tonina fluviatilis Aubl. (1775); Tonina fluviatilis f. obtusifolia Moldenke; Tonina fluviatilis f. parvifolia Moldenke

= Paepalanthus fluviatilis =

Species of aquatic plant

Paepalanthus fluviatilis is a plant species in the Eriocaulaceae. It is a hydroshrub or subshrub native to southern Mexico, Central America, northern South America (Bolivia, Colombia, Venezuela, Ecuador, Peru, northern Brazil, and the Guianas), Cuba and Trinidad.

One use of the plant is for medicinal purposes. The plant is ground up and mixed with a bark to make a liquid in which to bathe nursing infants. It is thought to give the infant strength.

It is also used as an aquarium plant. The shape of its leaf is pleasing and its color makes a good contrast with other plants when it is planted in small groups. However, it is difficult to grow as an aquarium plant.

The species was first described as Tonina fluviatilis by Jean Baptiste Christophore Fusée Aublet in 1775. In 2018 Maarten J. M. Christenhusz and James W. Byng placed the species in genus Paepalanthus as P. fluviatilis.
