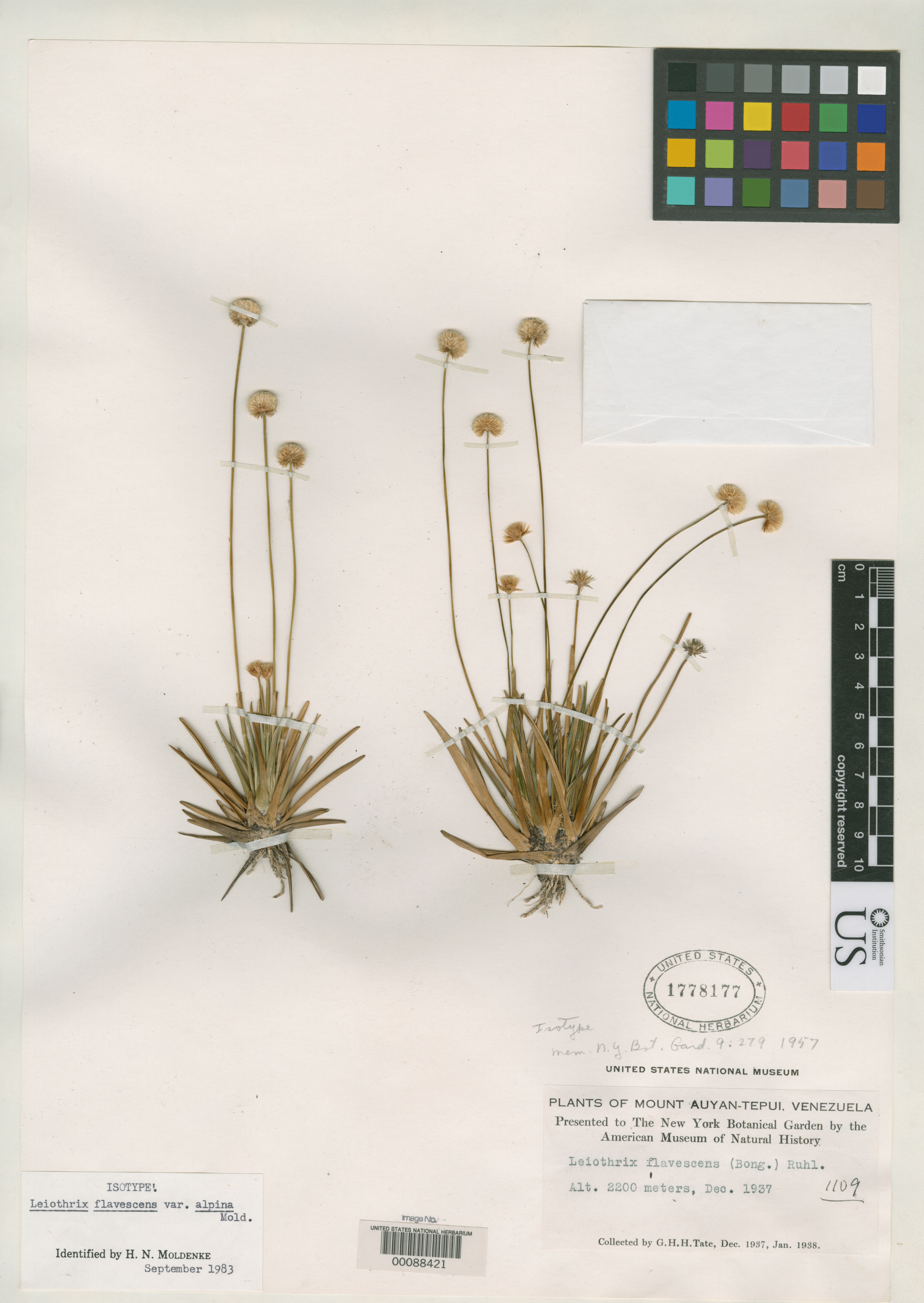
- Leiothrix flavescens var alpina Moldenke

Scientific classification
- Kingdom: Plantae
- Clade: Embryophytes
- Clade: Tracheophytes
- Clade: Spermatophytes
- Clade: Angiosperms
- Clade: Monocots
- Clade: Commelinids
- Order: Poales
- Family: Eriocaulaceae
- Genus: Leiothrix; L.B.Sm.

Synonyms
- Stephanophyllum Guill.

= Leiothrix (plant) =

Genus of flowering plants

Leiothrix is a genus of flowering plants in the family Eriocaulaceae. It is native to tropical South America.

== Species ==
39 species are accepted.

- Leiothrix angustifolia (Körn.) Ruhland – Bahia
- Leiothrix argentea Silveira – Minas Gerais
- Leiothrix argyroderma Ruhland – southeastern Brazil
- Leiothrix arrecta Ruhland – Minas Gerais
- Leiothrix beckii (Szyszyl. ex Wawra) Ruhland – Minas Gerais, Rio de Janeiro
- Leiothrix bracteosa (Herzog) Giul. – Bahia
- Leiothrix celiae Moldenke – Cerro Yutajé in Amazonas State of Venezuela
- Leiothrix cipoensis Giul – Minas Gerais
- Leiothrix crassifolia (Bong.) Ruhland – Minas Gerais
- Leiothrix curvifolia (Bong.) Ruhland – Minas Gerais
- Leiothrix distichoclada Herzog – Bahia
- Leiothrix echinocephala Ruhland – Minas Gerais
- Leiothrix flagellaris (Guill.) Ruhland – Minas Gerais
- Leiothrix flavescens (Bong.) Ruhland – Guyana, Venezuela, Brazil, Peru, Bolivia
- Leiothrix fluitans (Mart. ex Körn.) Ruhland – Minas Gerais
- Leiothrix fulgida Ruhland – Minas Gerais
- Leiothrix glauca Silveira – Minas Gerais
- Leiothrix gomesii Silveira – Minas Gerais
- Leiothrix graminea (Bong.) Ruhland – Minas Gerais
- Leiothrix hirsuta (Wikstr.) Ruhland – eastern Brazil
- Leiothrix linearis Silveira – Minas Gerais
- Leiothrix longipes Silveira – Minas Gerais
- Leiothrix luxurians (Körn.) Ruhland – Minas Gerais
- Leiothrix mucronata (Bong.) Ruhland – Minas Gerais
- Leiothrix pilulifera (Körn.) Ruhland – eastern Brazil
- Leiothrix plantago (Mart. ex Körn.) Giul. – Minas Gerais
- Leiothrix prolifera (Bong.) Ruhland – Minas Gerais
- Leiothrix propinqua (Körn.) Ruhland – Minas Gerais
- Leiothrix raymondii Giul. & D.M.Silva – Bahia
- Leiothrix restingensis (Moldenke) Giul. – Bahia
- Leiothrix rufula (A.St.-Hil.) Ruhland – eastern Brazil
- Leiothrix rupestris Giul. – Minas Gerais
- Leiothrix schlechtendalii (Körn.) Ruhland – Bahia
- Leiothrix sclerophylla Silveira – Minas Gerais
- Leiothrix sinuosa Giul – Minas Gerais
- Leiothrix spergula Ruhland – Minas Gerais
- Leiothrix spiralis (Bong.) Ruhland – Minas Gerais
- Leiothrix subulata Silveira – Minas Gerais
- Leiothrix vivipara (Bong.) Ruhland – Minas Gerais
