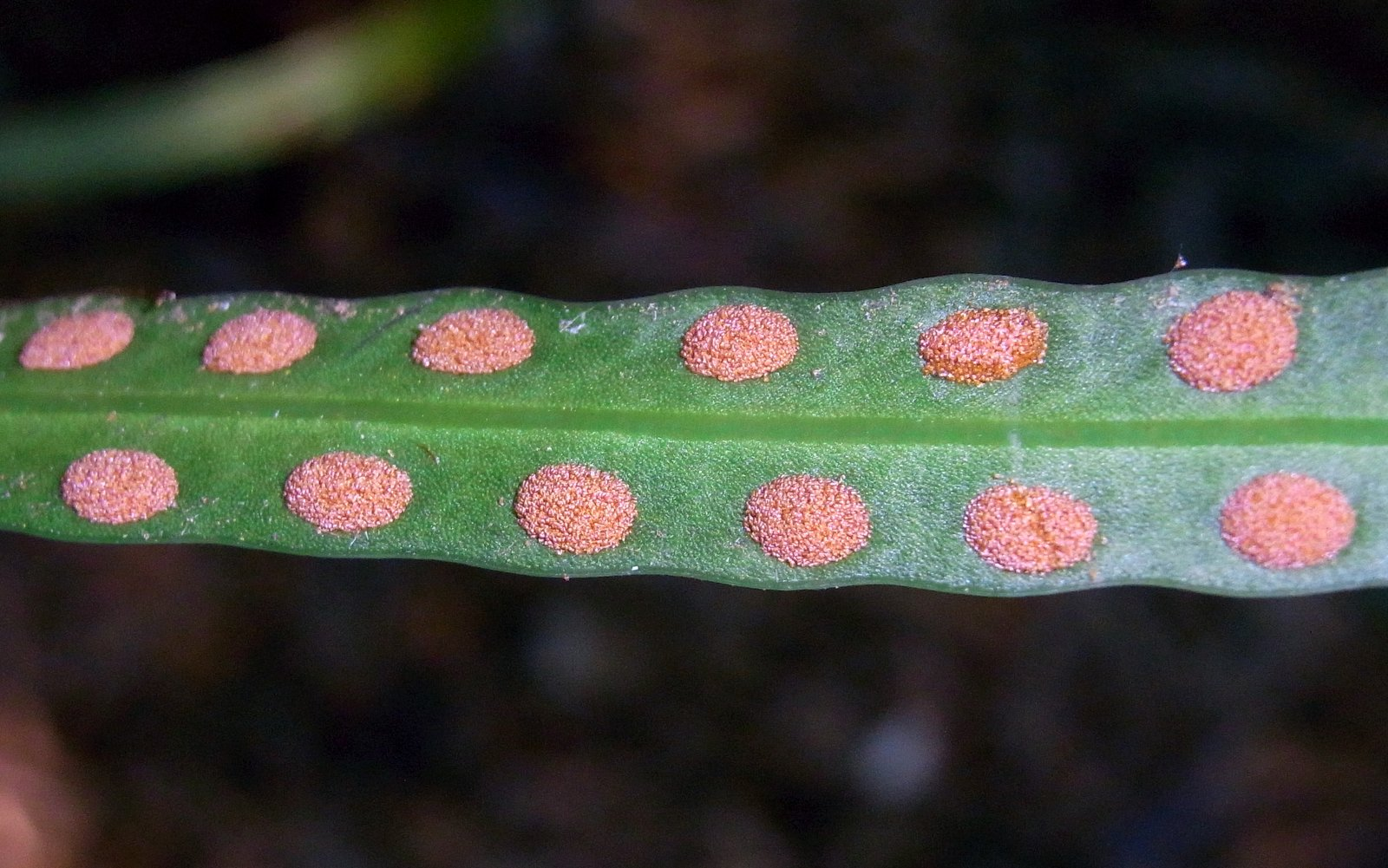
- Strap fern, (Dictymia brownii)

Scientific classification
- Kingdom: Plantae
- Clade: Tracheophytes
- Division: Polypodiophyta
- Class: Polypodiopsida
- Order: Polypodiales
- Suborder: Polypodiineae
- Family: Polypodiaceae
- Subfamily: Loxogrammoideae
- Genus: Dictymia; Sm.

= Dictymia =

Genus of ferns

Dictymia is a small genus of ferns. They are found growing on rocks, or hanging from branches in Malesia, Australia and islands of the Pacific Ocean.

== Species ==
Species include:

Image	Name	Distribution
	Dictymia mckeei,	New Caledonia, Fiji (Viti Levu)
	Dictymia brownii.	eastern Australia

The word Dictymia is from the ancient Greek language. It refers to the "net" like veiny patterns.

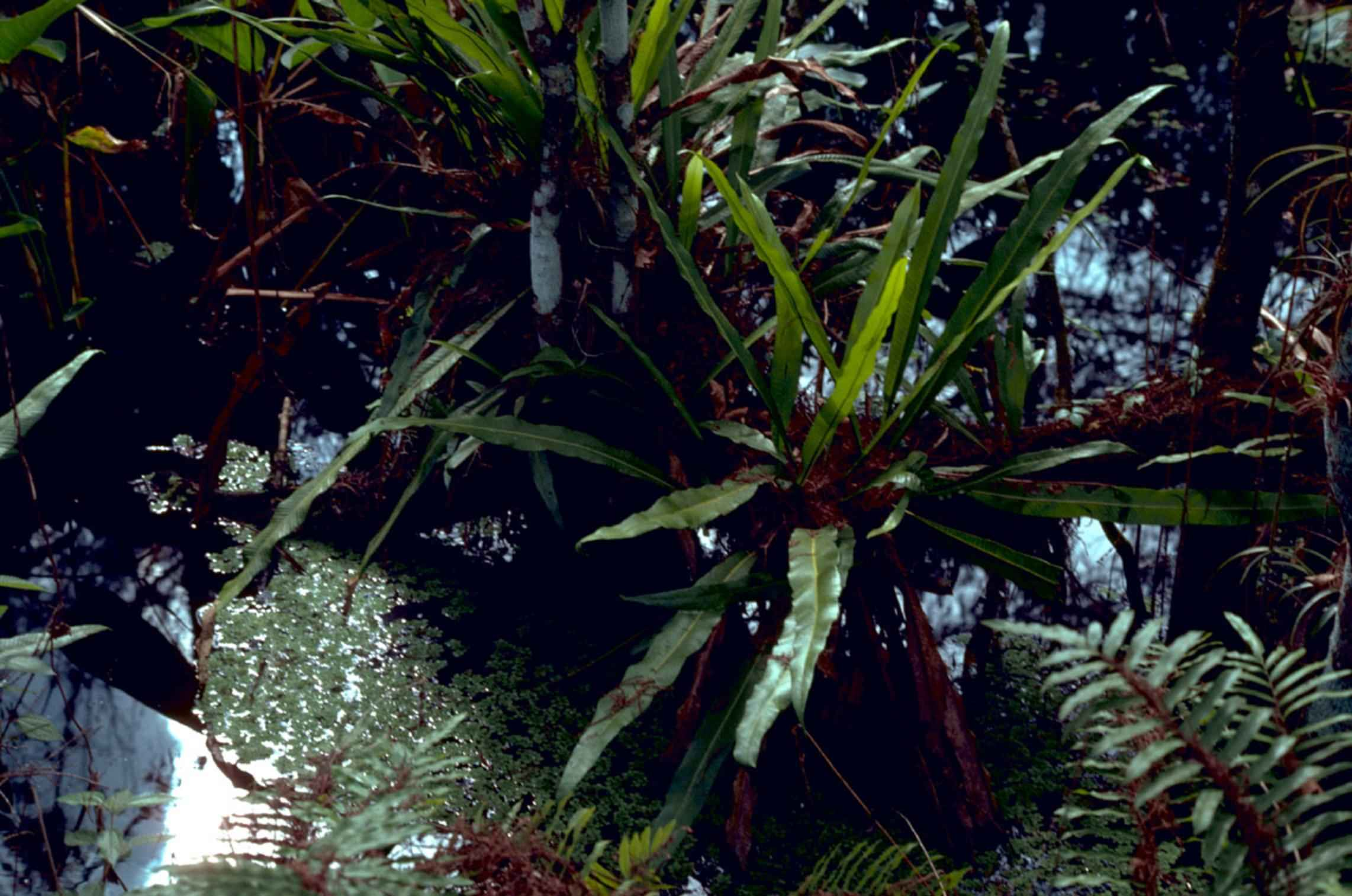
Dictymia mckeei
