= Monosperma =

Scientific classification
- Kingdom: Plantae
- Clade: Tracheophytes
- Clade: Angiosperms
- Clade: Monocots
- Clade: Commelinids
- Order: Poales
- Family: Eriocaulaceae
- Genus: Monosperma (Hensold) Andrino

Synonyms
- Paepalanthus subgen. Monosperma Hensold

Genus of flowering plants

Monosperma is a genus of flowering plants in the family Eriocaulaceae. It includes 23 species native to northern Brazil, Guyana, and Venezuela.

Monosperma was first described as a subgenus of Paepalanthus by Nancy Hensold in 1991. In 2023 Caroline Oliveira Andrino determined that Paepalanthus as then circumscribed was polyphyletic, and described Monosperma as a full genus.

== Species ==
23 species are accepted.

- Monosperma apacarense (Moldenke) Andrino
- Monosperma auyantepuiense (Moldenke) Andrino
- Monosperma cardonae (Moldenke) Andrino
- Monosperma chimantense (Hensold) Andrino
- Monosperma convexum (Gleason) Andrino
- Monosperma cumbricola (Moldenke) Andrino
- Monosperma fraternum (N.E.Br.) Andrino
- Monosperma fulgidum (Moldenke) Andrino
- Monosperma gleasonii (Moldenke) Andrino
- Monosperma holstii (Steyerm.) Andrino
- Monosperma kunhardtii (Moldenke) Andrino
- Monosperma major (Moldenke) Andrino
- Monosperma phelpsiae (Moldenke) Andrino
- Monosperma roraimense (Moldenke) Andrino
- Monosperma schomburgkii (Klotzsch ex Körn.) Andrino
- Monosperma scopulorum (Moldenke) Andrino
- Monosperma septentrionale (Trovó) Andrino
- Monosperma squamuliferum (Moldenke) Andrino
- Monosperma stegolepoides (Moldenke) Andrino
- Monosperma subcaulescens (N.E.Br.) Andrino
- Monosperma sulcatum (Hensold) Andrino
- Monosperma turbinatum (Gleason) Andrino
- Monosperma venustum (Moldenke) Andrino
