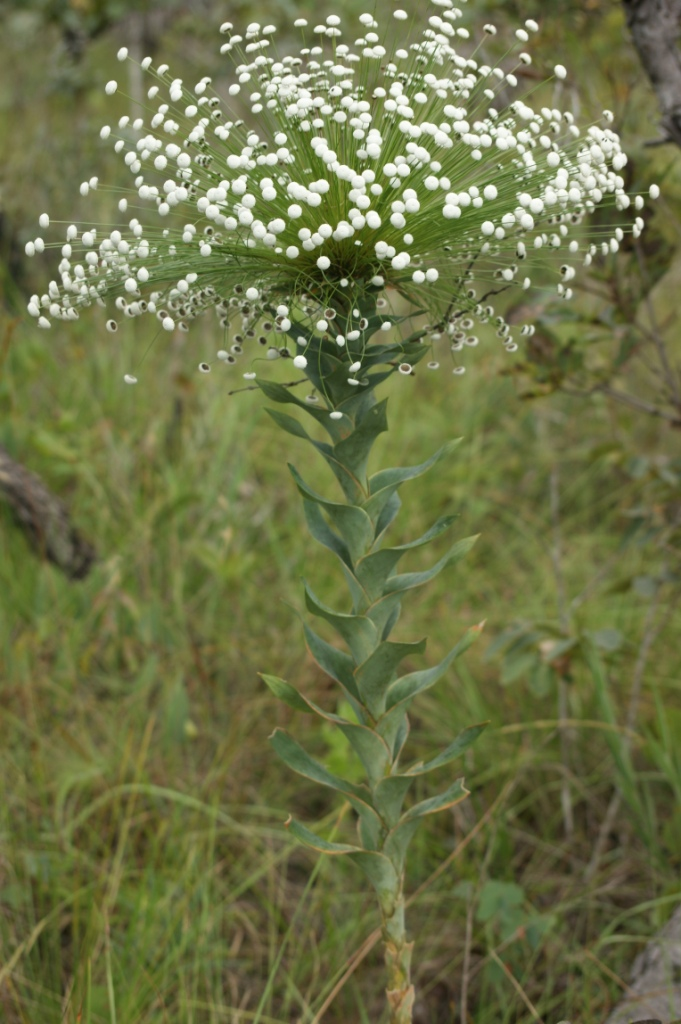
- Paepalanthus chiquitensis

Scientific classification
- Kingdom: Plantae
- Clade: Embryophytes
- Clade: Tracheophytes
- Clade: Spermatophytes
- Clade: Angiosperms
- Clade: Monocots
- Clade: Commelinids
- Order: Poales
- Family: Eriocaulaceae
- Genus: Paepalanthus; Mart.

Synonyms
- Actinocephalus (Körn.) Sano; Blastocaulon Ruhland; Cladocaulon Gardner; Cora Andrino & Sano (2023), non Cora Fr. (1825), fungal genus; Coracoralina Andrino & Sano; Cryptanthella (Suess.) Andrino, non Cryptanthela Gagnep.; Dupatya Vell.; Floralia Andrino & F.N.Costa; Giuliettia Andrino & Sano; Gnomus Andrino & Sano; Hydriade Andrino; Hyphydra Schreb.; Lachnocaulon Kunth; Moldenkeanthus Morat; Nisius Andrino; Paepalanthus Kunth (1841), nom. illeg. homonym. post.; Tonina Aubl., nom. rej.

= Paepalanthus =

Genus of flowering plants

Paepalanthus is a genus of plants in the family Eriocaulaceae. It includes 451 species native to the Americas (southeastern United States, southern Mexico, the Caribbean, Central America, and tropical South America), west and central tropical Africa, and Madagascar.

Plants of the World Online currently accepts 451 species. In 2023 Caroline Oliveira Andrino et al. published the most extensive molecular and morphological analysis of the genus to date, along with the broadest sampling of inflorescences in the family. They concluded the genus as then circumscribed was polyphyletic, and proposed six new genera (Coracoralina, Floralia, Giuliettia, Gnomus, Hydriade, and Nisius), redefining two subgenera as genera (Cryptanthella and Monosperma), reestablishing Actinocephalus, Lachnocaulon, and Tonina, and recircumscribing Paepalanthus as a monophyletic genus with 257 species which is largely restricted to the campos rupestres of the Espinhaço Range and adjacent mountains, with few species in the Serra da Mantiqueira complex, restingas of the coast of Brazil, with a disjunct distribution (Paepalanthus subg. Platycaulon) in the Andean paramo. As of April 2026 Plants of the World Online accepts the paraphyletic Monosperma as a distinct genus, and treats the other proposed genera as synonyms of Paepalanthus.

== Selected species ==
451 species are accepted. Selected species include:

- Paepalanthus bosseri (Morat) Stützel
- Paepalanthus bromelioides Silveira
- Paepalanthus celsus Tissot-Sq.
- Paepalanthus ensifolius (Kunth) Kunth
- Paepalanthus fluviatilis (Aubl.) Christenh. & Byng
- Paepalanthus intermedius Körn.
- Paepalanthus itremensis (Morat) Stützel
- Paepalanthus moaensis Gonz.Géigel
