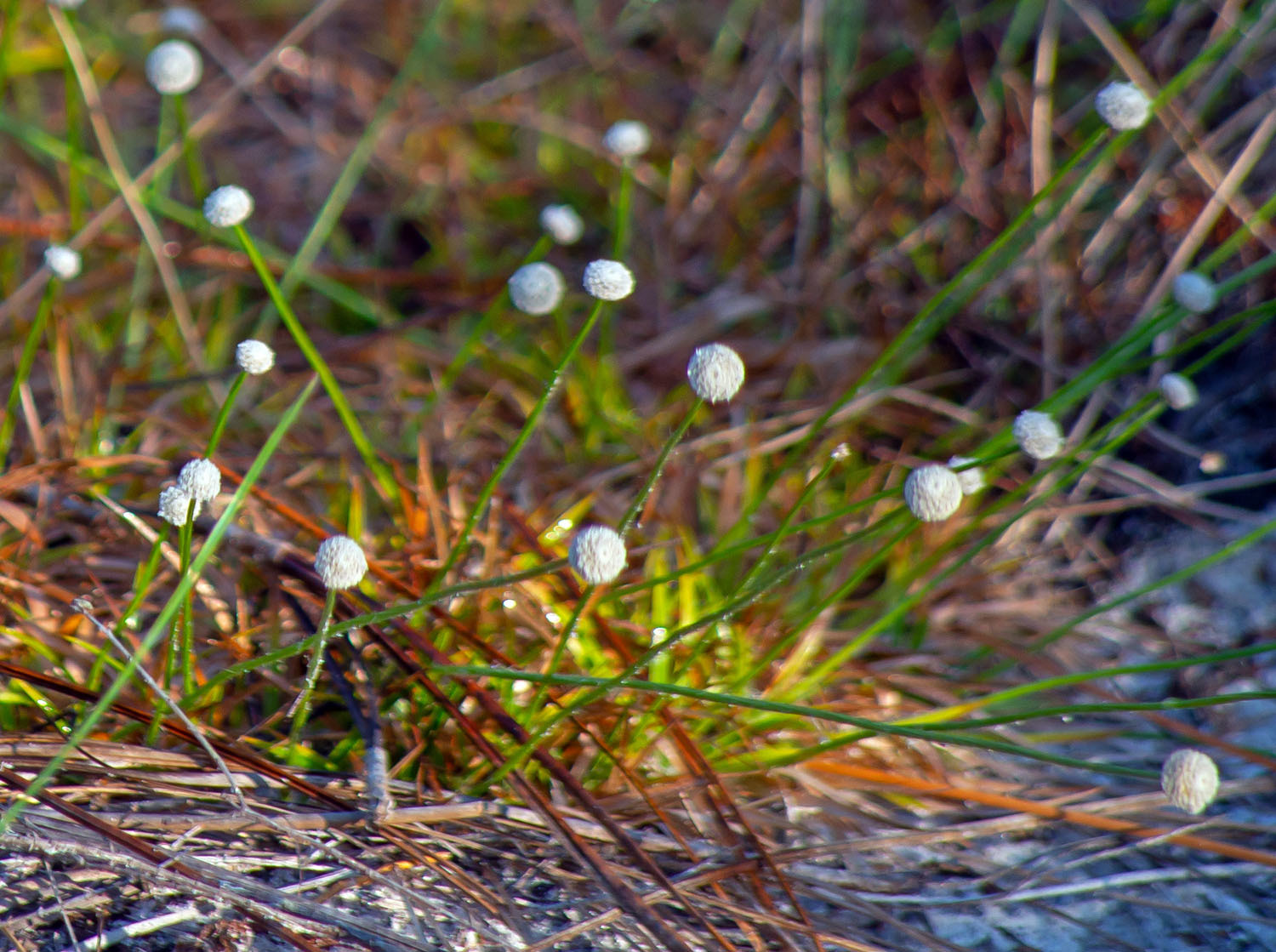
- L. beyrichianum

Scientific classification
- Kingdom: Plantae
- Clade: Tracheophytes
- Clade: Angiosperms
- Clade: Monocots
- Clade: Commelinids
- Order: Poales
- Family: Eriocaulaceae
- Genus: Lachnocaulon; Kunth

= Lachnocaulon =

Genus of flowering plants

Lachnocaulon (bogbutton) is a genus of plants in the Eriocaulaceae. It contains 7 known species, native to Cuba and to the southeastern United States (from Texas to Virginia).

== Species ==
- Lachnocaulon anceps (Walter) Morong - from Texas to Virginia; Isla de la Juventud in Cuba
- Lachnocaulon beyrichianum Sporl. ex Körn - Florida, Georgia, Alabama, North and South Carolina
- †Lachnocaulon cubense Ruhland - Cuba, apparently extinct
- Lachnocaulon digynum Körn - from eastern Texas to the Florida Panhandle
- Lachnocaulon ekmanii Ruhland - Cuba
- Lachnocaulon engleri Ruhland - Florida, southern Alabama
- Lachnocaulon minus (Chapm.) Small - Florida, Georgia, Alabama, North and South Carolina
