= Wilhelm Ruhland =

German botanist (1878–1960)

Eugen Otto Wilhelm Ruhland (7 August 1878 – January 5, 1960) was a German botanist and plant physiologist. He served as a professor of botany at the universities of Tübingen and Erlangen.

Ruhland was born in Schleswig where his father was a government official. After studies at Köllnisches Gymnasium in Berlin, he went to the University of Berlin in 1896. He received a doctorate in 1899 and habilitated in 1903. He then lectured at the University of Berlin and simultaneously worked on the family Eriocaulaceae and contributed to Adolf Engler's volumes on plants (volume 13). In 1911 he joined the University of Halle where he worked on agricultural botany (and fungal infections of crops) and in 1918 he became a professor at the University of Tübingen. In 1922 he became a full professor at the University of Leipzig. Along with Hans Winkler he founded and edited the journal Planta from 1925. In 1933 he was a signatory to the Vow of allegiance of the Professors of the German Universities and High-Schools to Adolf Hitler and the National Socialistic State. From 1947 he served as an honorary professor at the University of Erlangen. From 1955 he contributed to the Handbuch der Pflanzenphysiologie. A fungus Ruhlandiella is named after him.
