= Johan Emanuel Wikström =

Swedish botanist (1789–1856)

Johan Emanuel Wikström (born 1789 in Vänersborg, Sweden – died 1856 in Stockholm, Sweden) was a Swedish botanist.

He studied law and medicine at the University of Uppsala and obtained his medical doctorate in 1817. He worked closely with Olof Swartz at the Bergianska trädgården, where in 1818 he succeeded Swartz as garden superintendent. In 1823, he attained the title of professor. From 1821 onward, he taught natural history classes at the gymnasium in Stockholm.

From 1822 to 1855, he published Öfversigt af botaniska arbeten och upptäckter för åren 1820-51 ("Overview of botanical works and discoveries for the years 1820 to 1851"), being issued in 32 volumes. The botanical genus Wikstroemia (family Thymelaeaceae) was named in his honor by Stephan Endlicher.

== Selected works ==
- Dissertatio botanica de Daphne (1820).
- Några arter af växtslägtet Rosa (1821).
- Conspectus litteraturæ botanicæ in Suecia : ab antiquissimis temporibus usque ad finem anni 1831, notis bibliographicis et biographis auctorum adjectis (1831).
- Stockholms flora, eller korrt beskrifning af de vid Stockholm i vildt tillstånd förekommande växter (1840).
