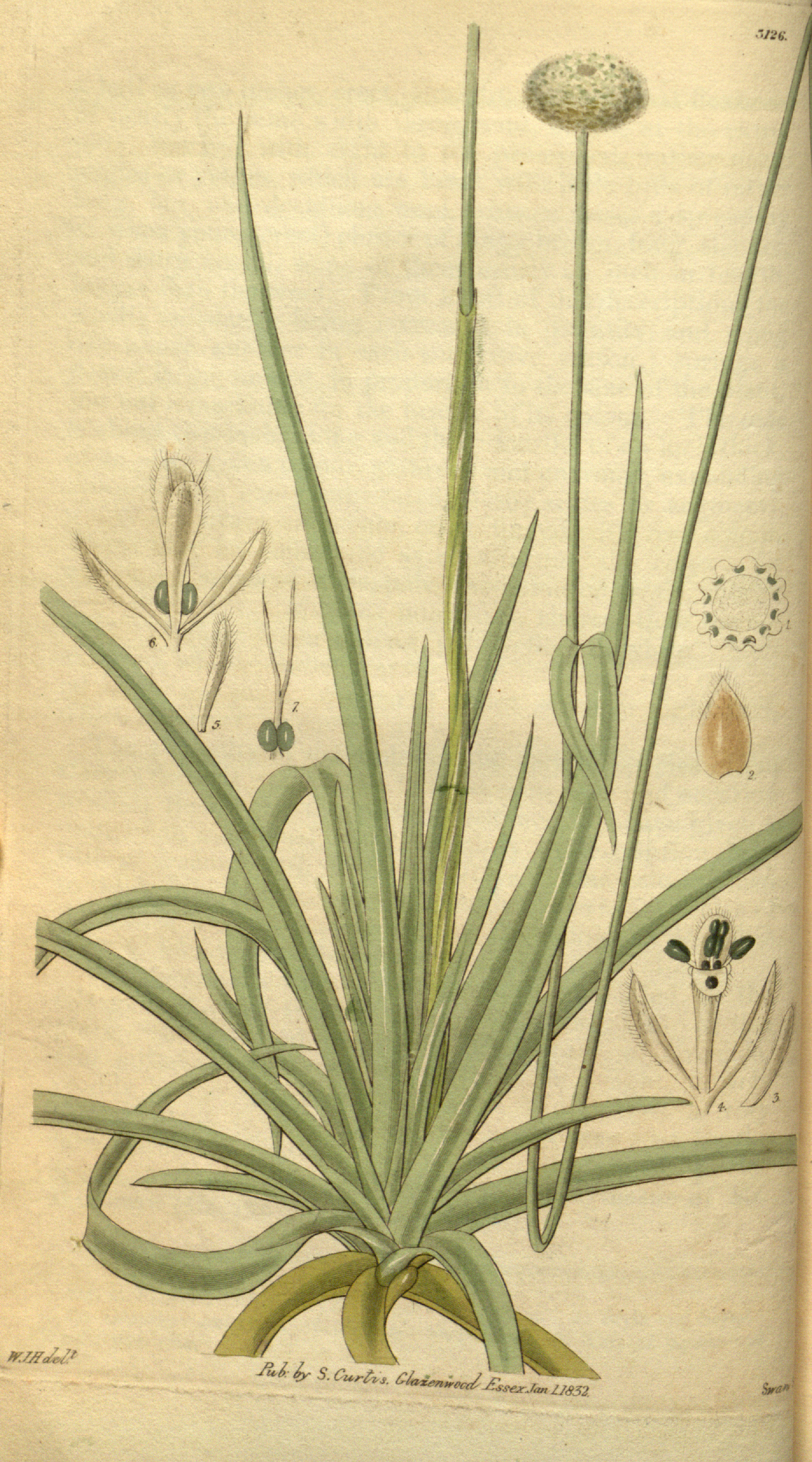
- Eriocaulon decangulare 1832 illustration

Scientific classification
- Kingdom: Plantae
- Clade: Embryophytes
- Clade: Tracheophytes
- Clade: Spermatophytes
- Clade: Angiosperms
- Clade: Monocots
- Clade: Commelinids
- Order: Poales
- Family: Eriocaulaceae; Martinov

Genera
- 8; see text

= Eriocaulaceae =

Family of flowering plants

The Eriocaulaceae are a family of monocotyledonous flowering plants in the order Poales, commonly known as the pipewort family. The family is large, with about 1207 known species described in eight genera. They are widely distributed, with the centers of diversity for the group occurring in tropical regions, particularly the Americas. Very few species extend to temperate regions, with only 16 species in the United States, mostly in the southern states from California to Florida, only two species in Canada, and only one species (Eriocaulon aquaticum) in Europe. They tend to be associated with wet soils, many growing in shallow water. This is also reported from the Western Ghats hot spot in the southern part of India.

The species are mostly herbaceous perennial plants, though some are annual plants; they resemble plants in the related families Cyperaceae (sedges) and Juncaceae (rushes), and like them, have rather small, wind-pollinated flowers grouped together in capitulum-like inflorescences.

== Genera ==
Eight genera are currently accepted.

- Comanthera L.B.Sm.
- Eriocaulon L. – pipewort
- Leiothrix Ruhland
- Mesanthemum Körn.
- Monosperma (Hensold) Andrino
- Paepalanthus Mart. (synonyms Actinocephalus, Lachnocaulon (bogbutton), and Tonina)
- Rondonanthus Herzog
- Syngonanthus Ruhland

== See also ==
- Delia Abbiatti
